= New York City =

Most populous city in the United States

New York
- City
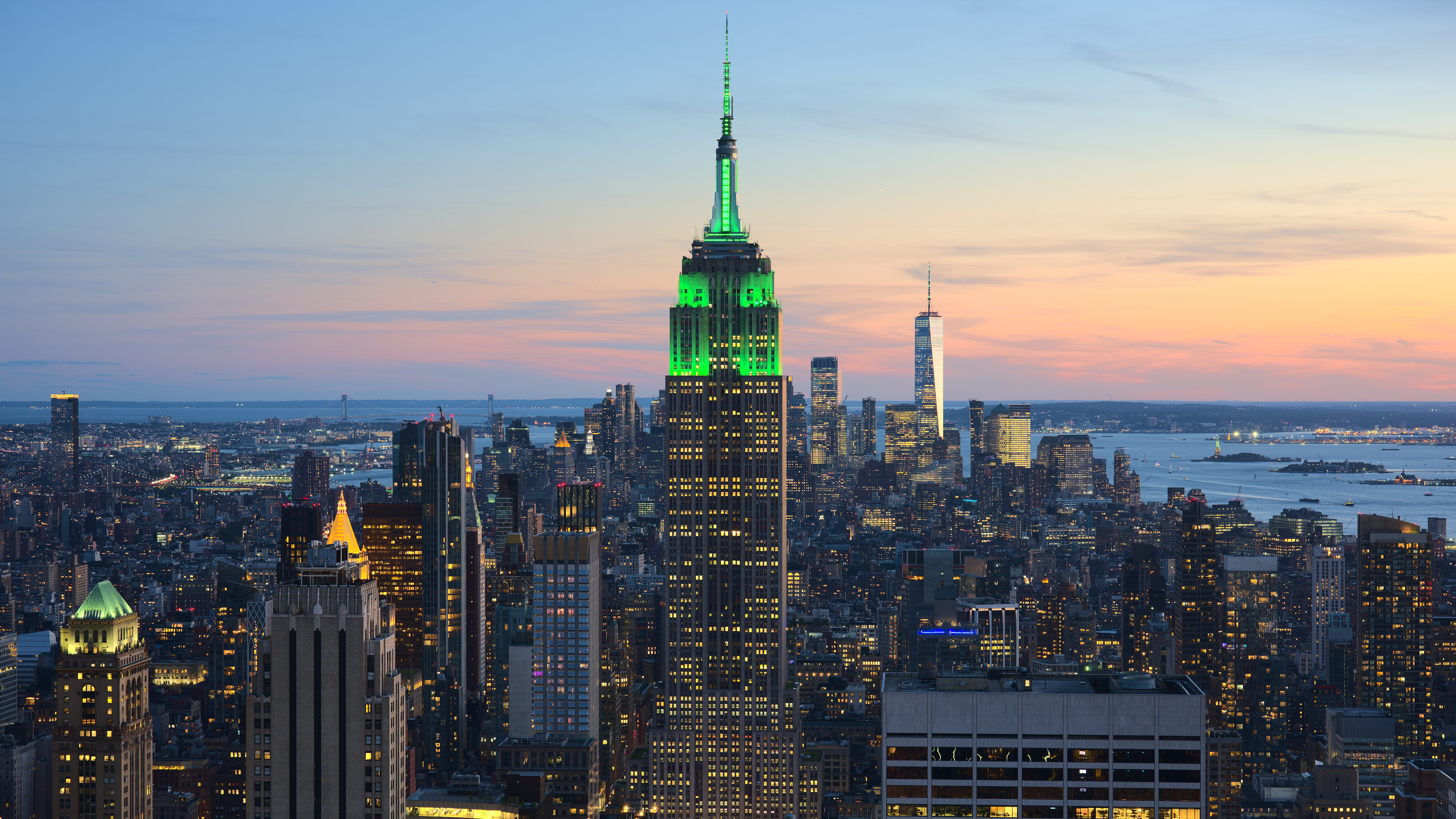
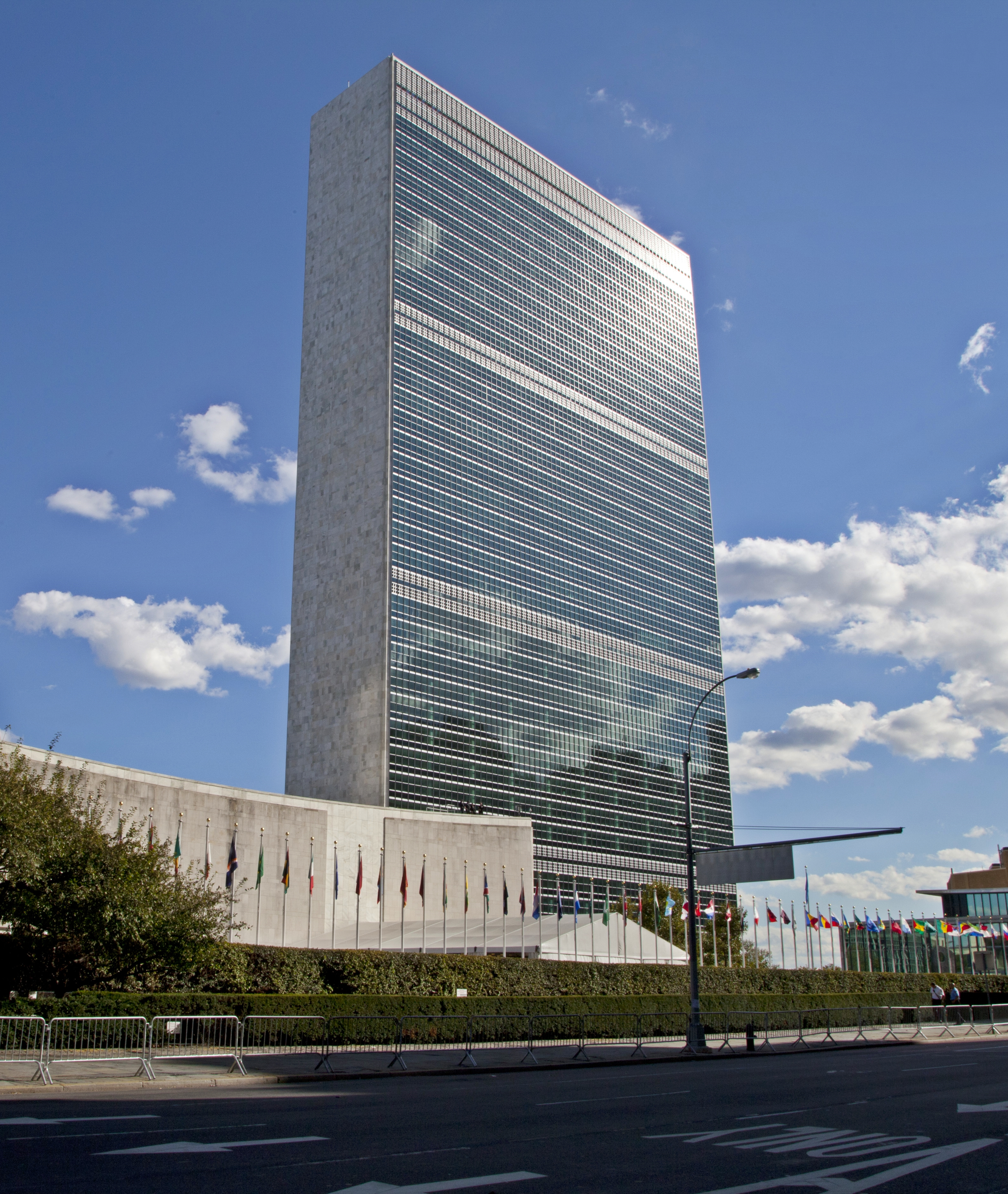
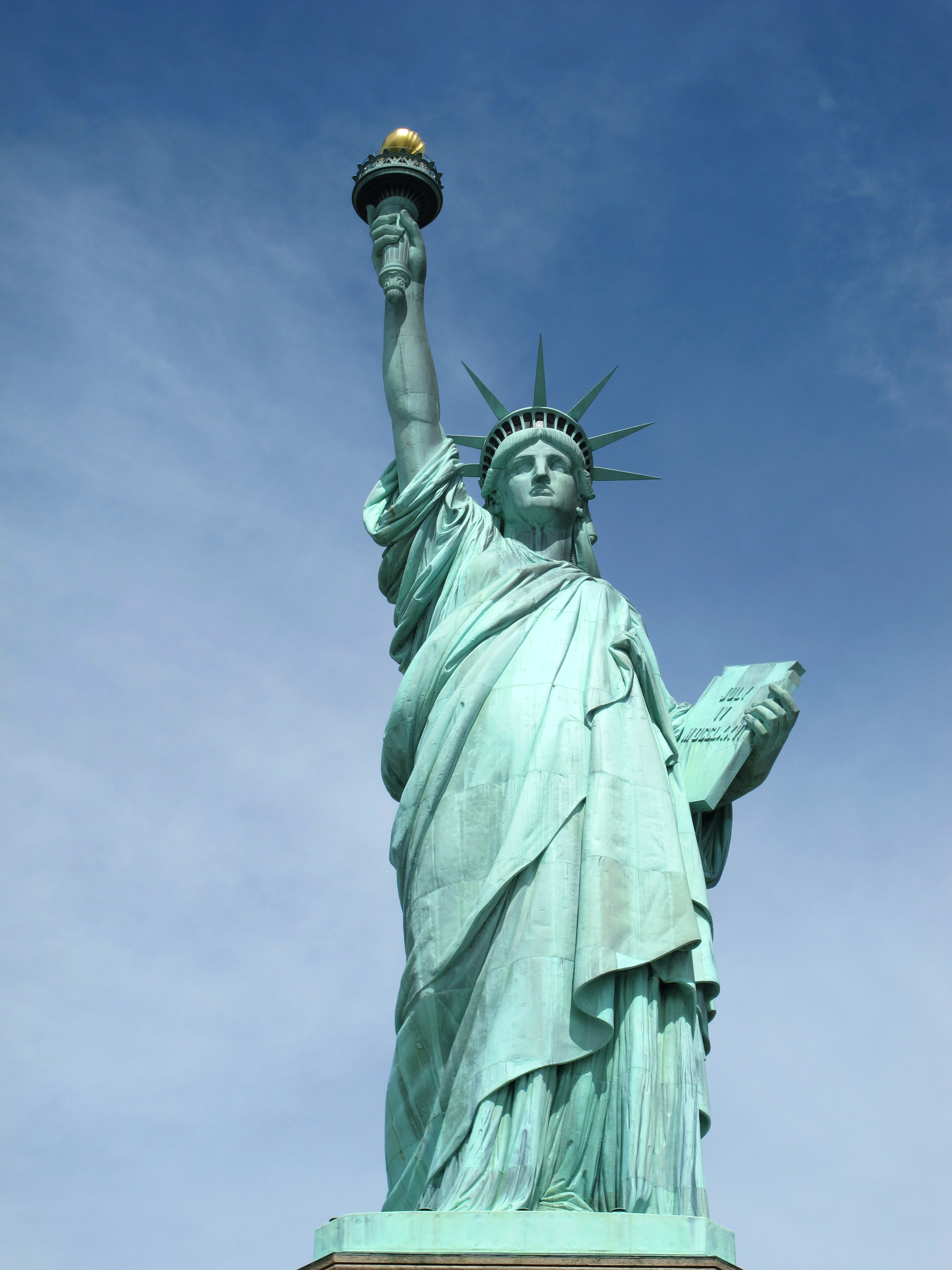
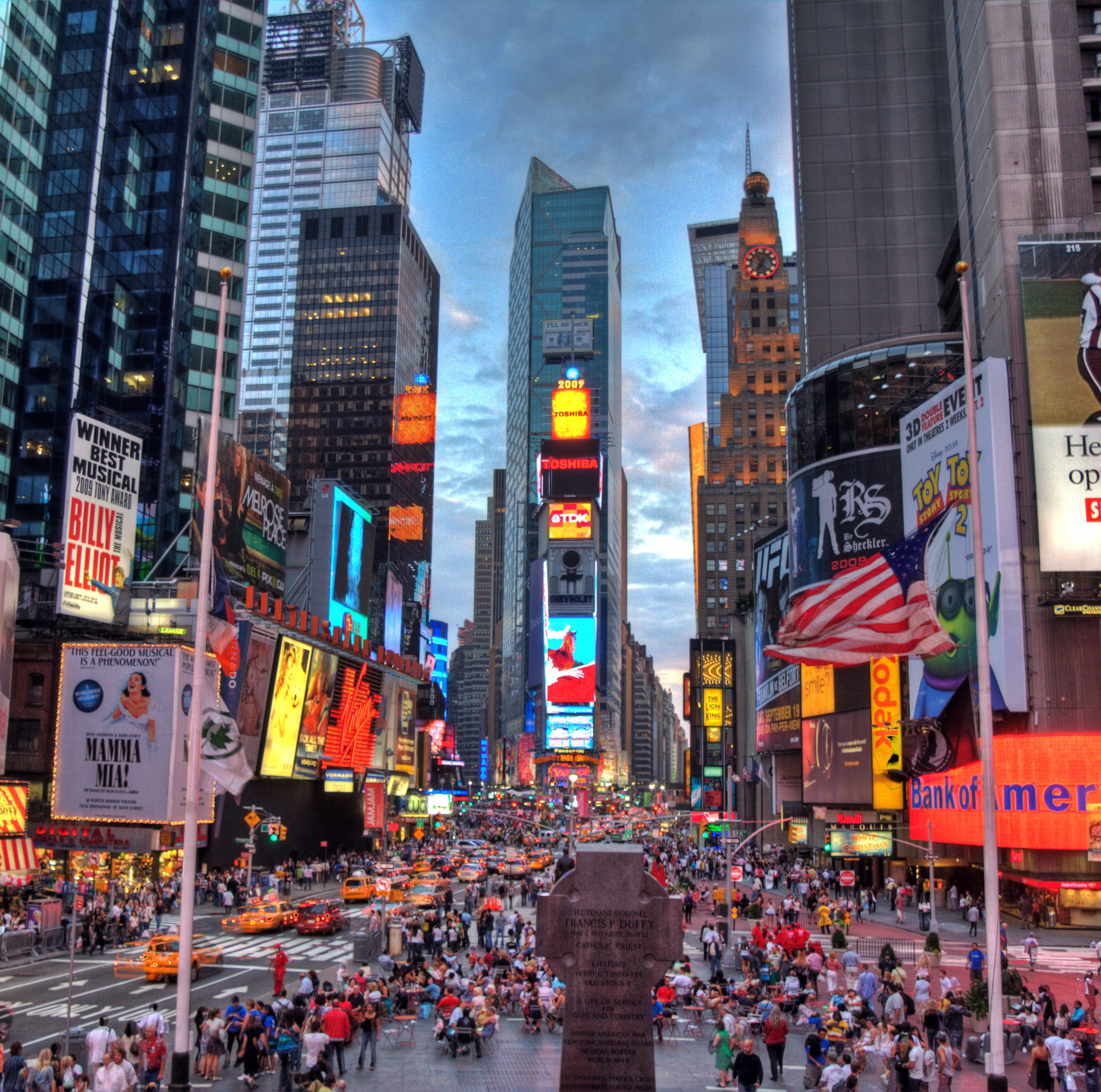
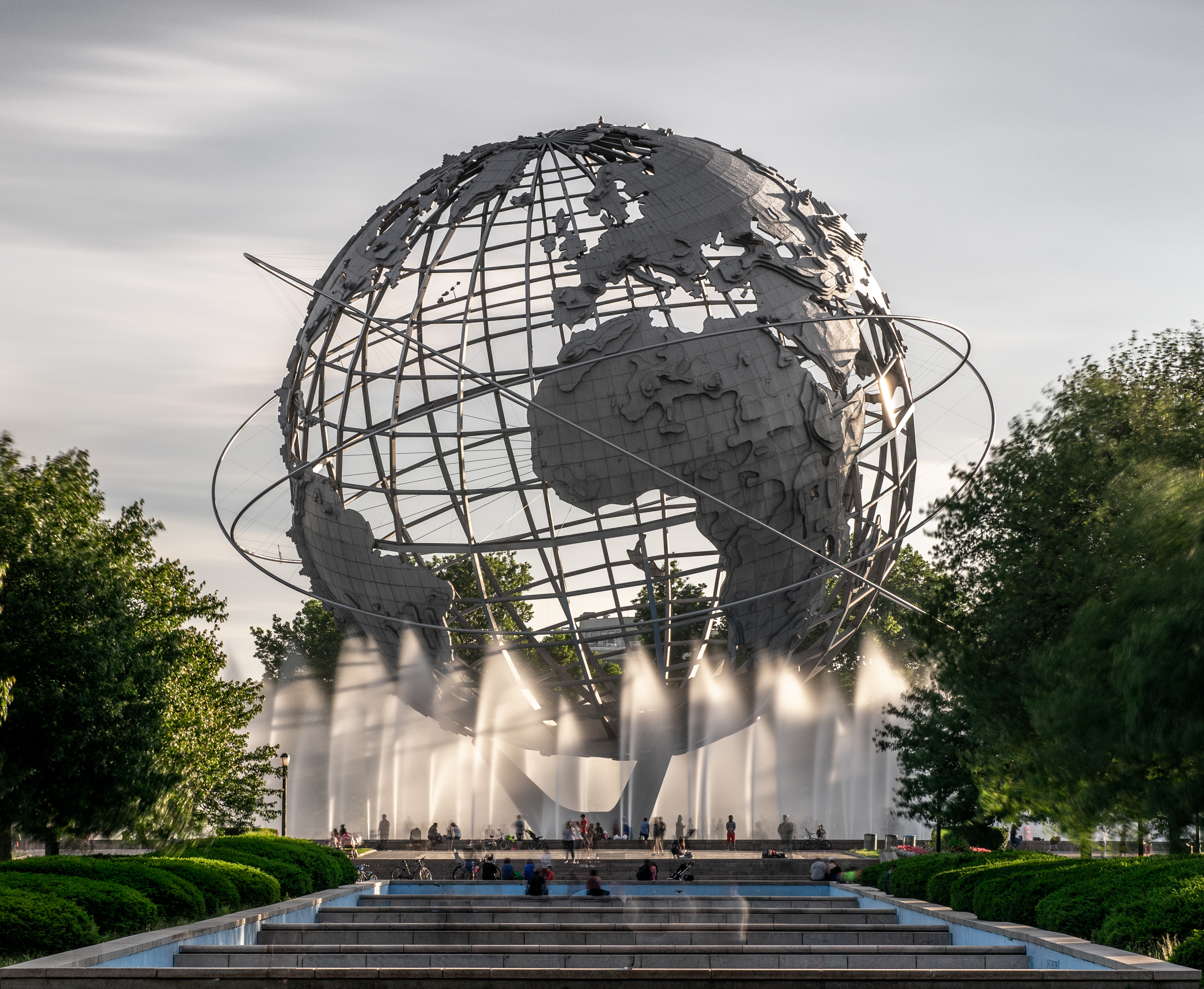
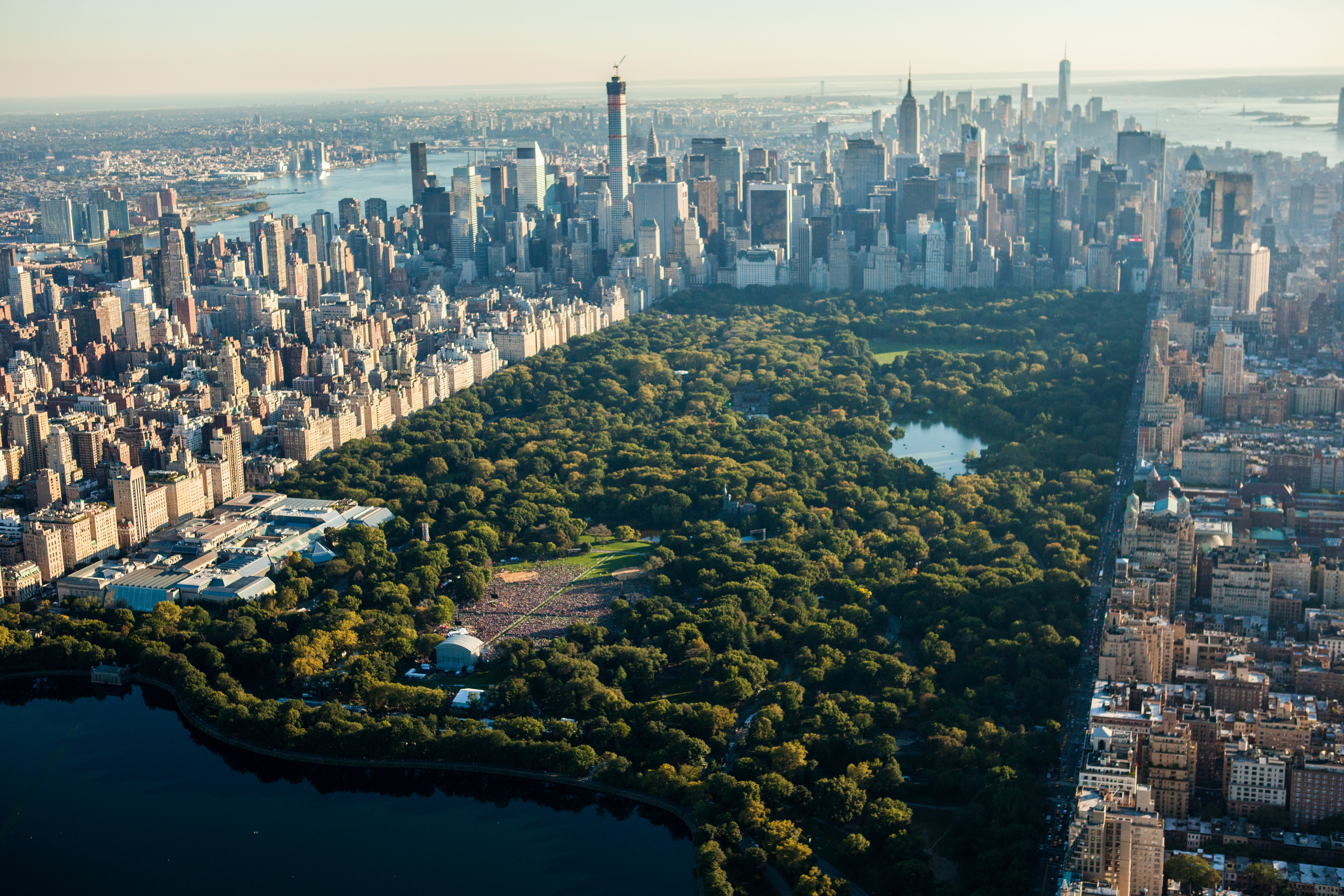
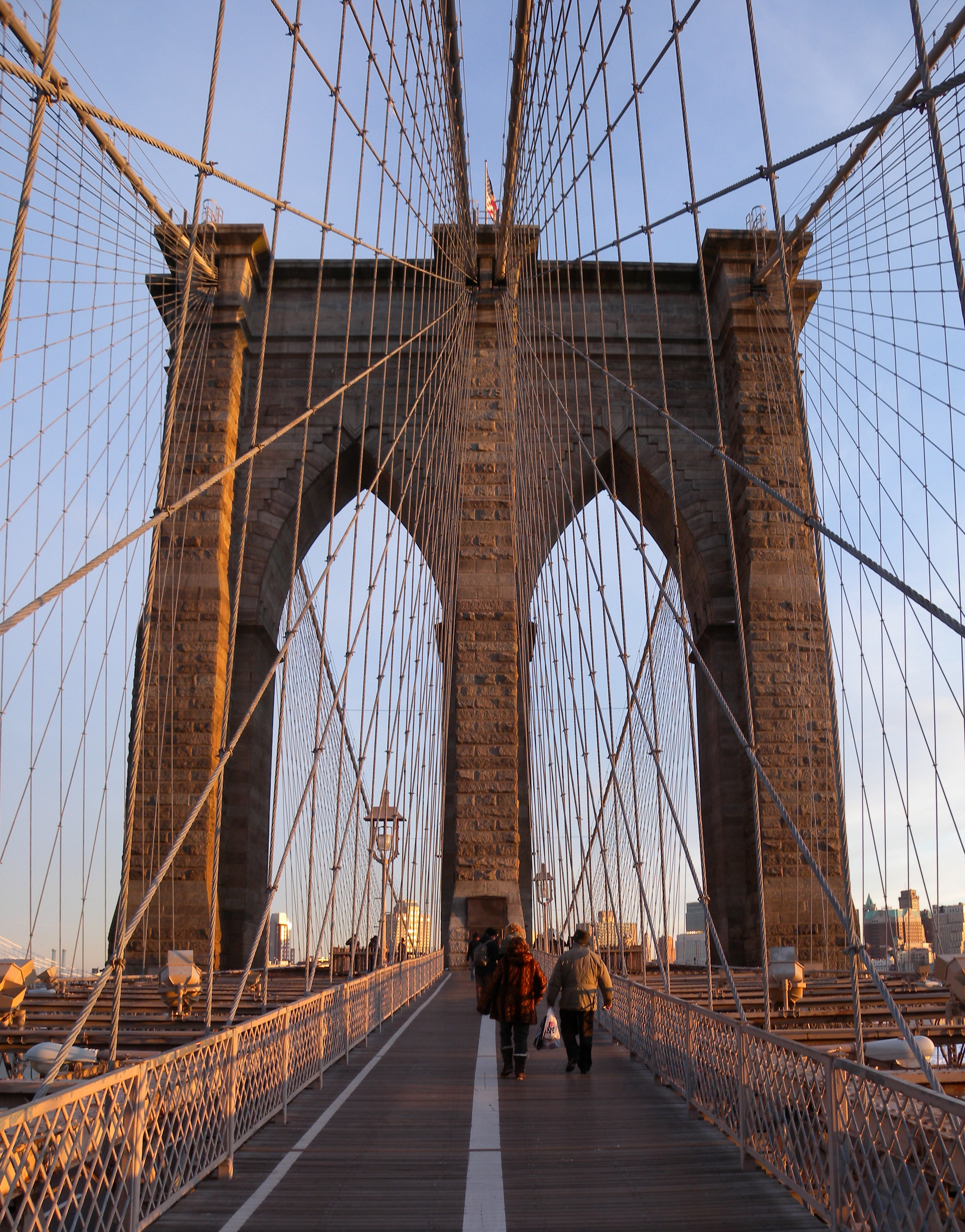
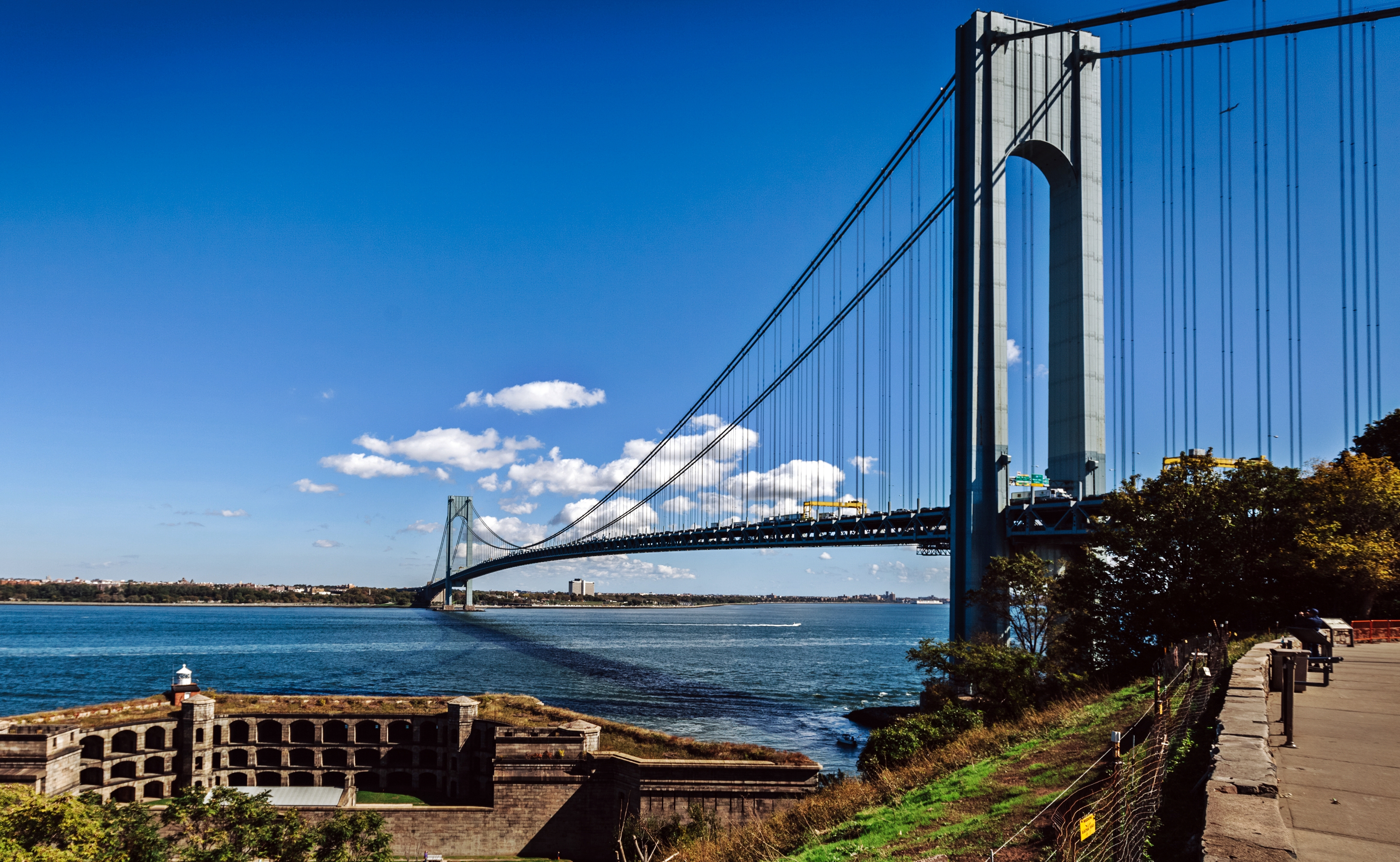
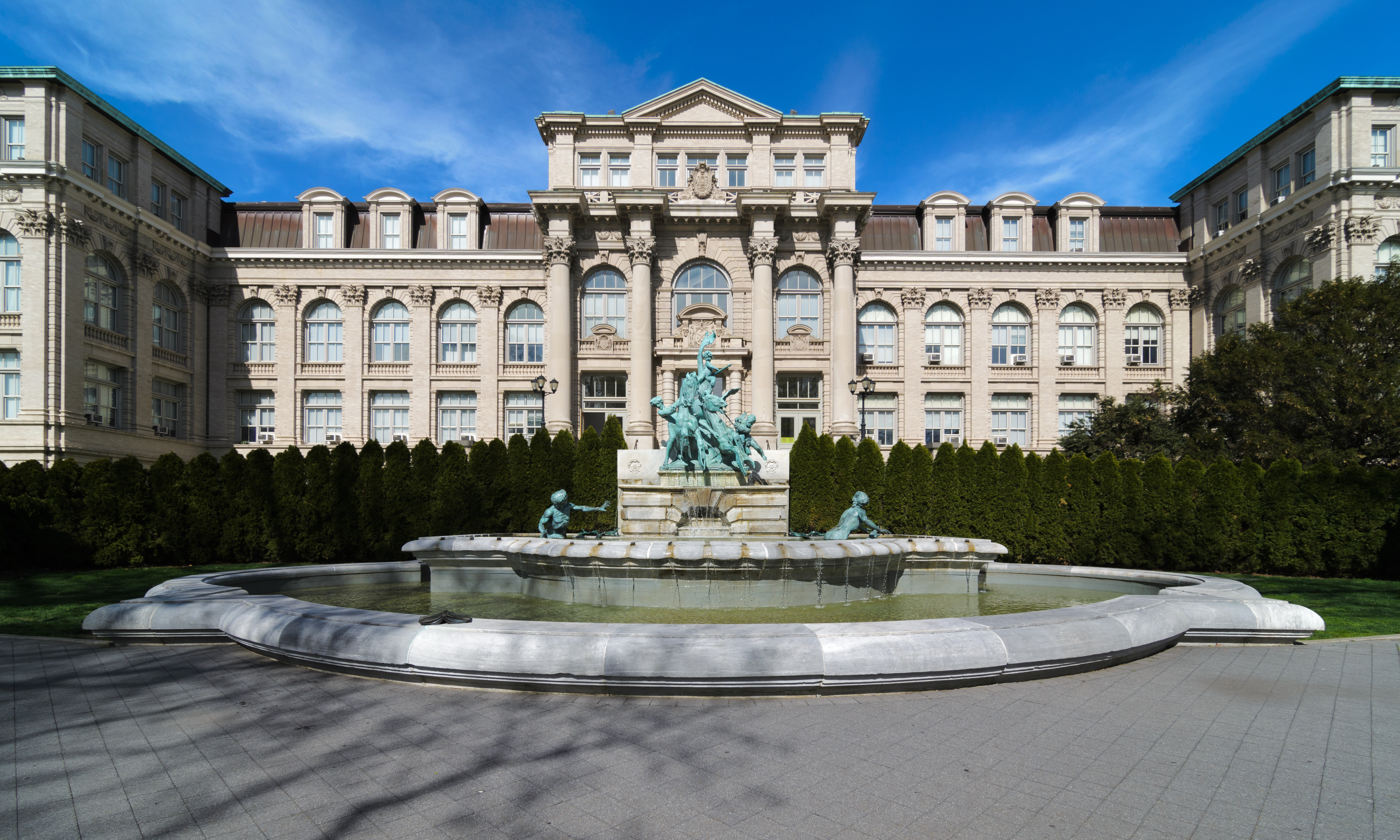
- Midtown Manhattan with the Empire State Building (center, foreground) and Lower Manhattan with One World Trade Center (background) United Nations Headquarters Statue of Liberty Times Square Unisphere Central Park Brooklyn Bridge Verrazzano–Narrows Bridge New York Botanical Garden Library

- Flag Seal Wordmark
- Nicknames: The Big Apple, The City That Never Sleeps, Gotham, and others
- Interactive map of New York
- Location within the state of New York Location within the United States
- Coordinates: 40°42′46″N 74°00′22″W
- Country: United States
- State: New York
- Settled: May 20, 1624 (402 years ago)
- Current name: September 8, 1664 (362 years ago)
- Consolidated: January 1, 1898 (128 years ago)
- Founder: Dutch West India Company
- Named for: York, England (in honor of James, the Duke of York)
- Constituent counties (boroughs): Bronx (the Bronx); Kings (Brooklyn); New York (Manhattan); Queens (Queens); Richmond (Staten Island)

Government
  - Type: Strong mayor–council
  - Body: New York City Council
  - Mayor: Zohran Mamdani (D)

Area
  - Total: 472.43 sq mi (1,223.59 km^{2})
  - Land: 300.46 sq mi (778.18 km^{2})
  - Water: 171.97 sq mi (445.41 km^{2})
- Highest elevation (Note: The highest point in New York City is Todt Hill.): 400 ft (122 m)
- Lowest elevation: 0 ft (0 m)

Population (2020)
  - Total: 8,804,190
  - Estimate (2025): ▼8,584,629
  - Rank: 1st in the United States
  - Density: 29,303/sq mi (11,313.8/km^{2})
  - Urban: 19,426,449
  - Urban density: 5,981/sq mi (2,309.2/km^{2})
  - Metro: 20,140,470
- Demonym: New Yorker

GDP
  - Total: $1.378 trillion (2024)
  - Metro: $2.443 trillion (2024) (1st)
- Time zone: UTC–5 (EST)
  - Summer (DST): UTC–4 (EDT)
- ZIP Codes: 100xx–104xx, 11004–05, 111xx–114xx, 116xx
- Area codes: 212/646/332, 718/347/929, 917
- FIPS code: 36-51000
- GNIS feature ID: 975772
- Website: nyc.gov

New York, often called New York City (NYC), (Note: To distinguish it from the state of New York) is the most populous city in the United States. It is located at the southern tip of New York State on New York Harbor, one of the world's largest natural harbors. The city comprises five boroughs—Manhattan, Brooklyn, Queens, the Bronx, and Staten Island—each being coextensive with its respective county. It is the geographical and demographic center of both the Northeast megalopolis and the New York metropolitan area, the largest metropolitan area in the United States by both population and urban area and one of the world's most populous urban agglomerations. New York is a global center of technology, finance and commerce, health care and life sciences research, culture, entertainment and media, academics and scientific output, the arts and fashion—and as home to the headquarters of the United Nations, international diplomacy. (Note: Attributed to multiple sources:) New York City is known for its fast pace and continuous urban energy.

With an estimated population of 8,586,038 as of 2026, distributed over 300.46 square miles (778.2 km^{2}), New York is the most densely populated major city in the United States. New York City has more than double the population of Los Angeles, the country's second-most populous city. More than 20.1 million people live in New York City's metropolitan statistical area, and approximately 22.5 million people live in its combined statistical area, both of which are the largest in the U.S. The city and its metropolitan area serve as the premier gateway for legal immigration to the United States. An estimated 800 languages are spoken in New York City, making it the most linguistically diverse city in the world. The New York City metropolitan region is home to the largest foreign-born population of any metropolitan region in the world, numbering approximately 5.9 million people as of 2023.

Manhattan Island was inhabited by Munsee-speaking Lenape around 1624. By then, Dutch colonists had established Fort Amsterdam as a center of trade on the island. This was the first European settlement in what would become New York City. The settlement was named New Amsterdam in 1626 and was chartered as a city in 1653. The city came under English control in 1664 and was temporarily renamed New York after Charles II granted the lands to his brother, the Duke of York, James II, before this name was permanently adopted in 1674. Following independence from the Kingdom of Great Britain, New York City was the national capital of the United States from 1785 until 1790. The modern city was formed by the 1898 consolidation of its five boroughs.

Anchored by Wall Street in Manhattan's Financial District, New York City has been called both the world's premier financial and fintech center and the most economically powerful city in the world. As of 2024, the New York metropolitan area is the largest metropolitan economy in the world, with a gross metropolitan product of over US$2.44 trillion. The New York metropolitan area's economy is larger than all but nine countries. Despite having a 24/7 rapid transit system, New York also leads the world in urban automobile traffic congestion. The city is home to the world's two largest stock exchanges by total market capitalization of their listed companies, the NASDAQ and the New York Stock Exchange. New York City is an established haven for global investors.

As of 2025, New York City is the most expensive city in the world for expatriates, and there are escalating concerns about affordability in the city. New York County (Manhattan) is, by a significant margin, the most expensive U.S. county in terms of average home price per square foot and produces the highest U.S. county GDP by both absolute and per capita measures. Fifth Avenue is an ultra-luxury international shopping corridor that is undergoing additional infrastructure investment. New York City is home to the highest number of billionaires, individuals of ultra-high net worth (greater than US$30 million), and millionaires of any city in the world by a significant margin.

== Etymology ==
In 1664, New York was named in honor of the Duke of York (later King James II of England). James's elder brother, Charles II, appointed him proprietor of the former territory of New Netherland, including the city of New Amsterdam, when England seized it from Dutch control. New Netherland was renamed the Province of New York (now New York State).

== History ==
=== Early history ===
In the pre-Columbian era, the area of present-day New York City was inhabited by Algonquians, including Munsee-speaking Lenape. The homeland of the Lenape, known as Lenapehoking, included the present-day areas of Staten Island, Manhattan, the Bronx, the western portion of Long Island (including Brooklyn and Queens), and the Lower Hudson Valley.

The first documented visit to New York Harbor by a European was in 1524, by Italian explorer Giovanni da Verrazzano. He claimed the area for France and named it Nouvelle Angoulême (New Angoulême). A Spanish expedition, led by the Portuguese captain Estêvão Gomes sailing for Emperor Charles V, arrived in New York Harbor in January 1525 and charted the mouth of the Hudson River, which he named Río de San Antonio ('Saint Anthony's River').

In 1609, the English explorer Henry Hudson rediscovered New York Harbor while searching for the Northwest Passage to the Orient for the Dutch East India Company. He sailed up what the Dutch called North River (now the Hudson River), named first by Hudson as the Mauritius after Maurice, Prince of Orange.

Hudson claimed the region for the Dutch East India Company. In 1614, the area between Cape Cod and Delaware Bay was claimed by the Netherlands and named Nieuw-Nederland ("New Netherland"). The first non–Native American inhabitant of what became New York City was Juan Rodriguez, a merchant from Santo Domingo, who arrived in Manhattan during the winter of 1613–14, trapping for pelts and trading with the local population as a representative of the Dutch.

=== Dutch rule ===
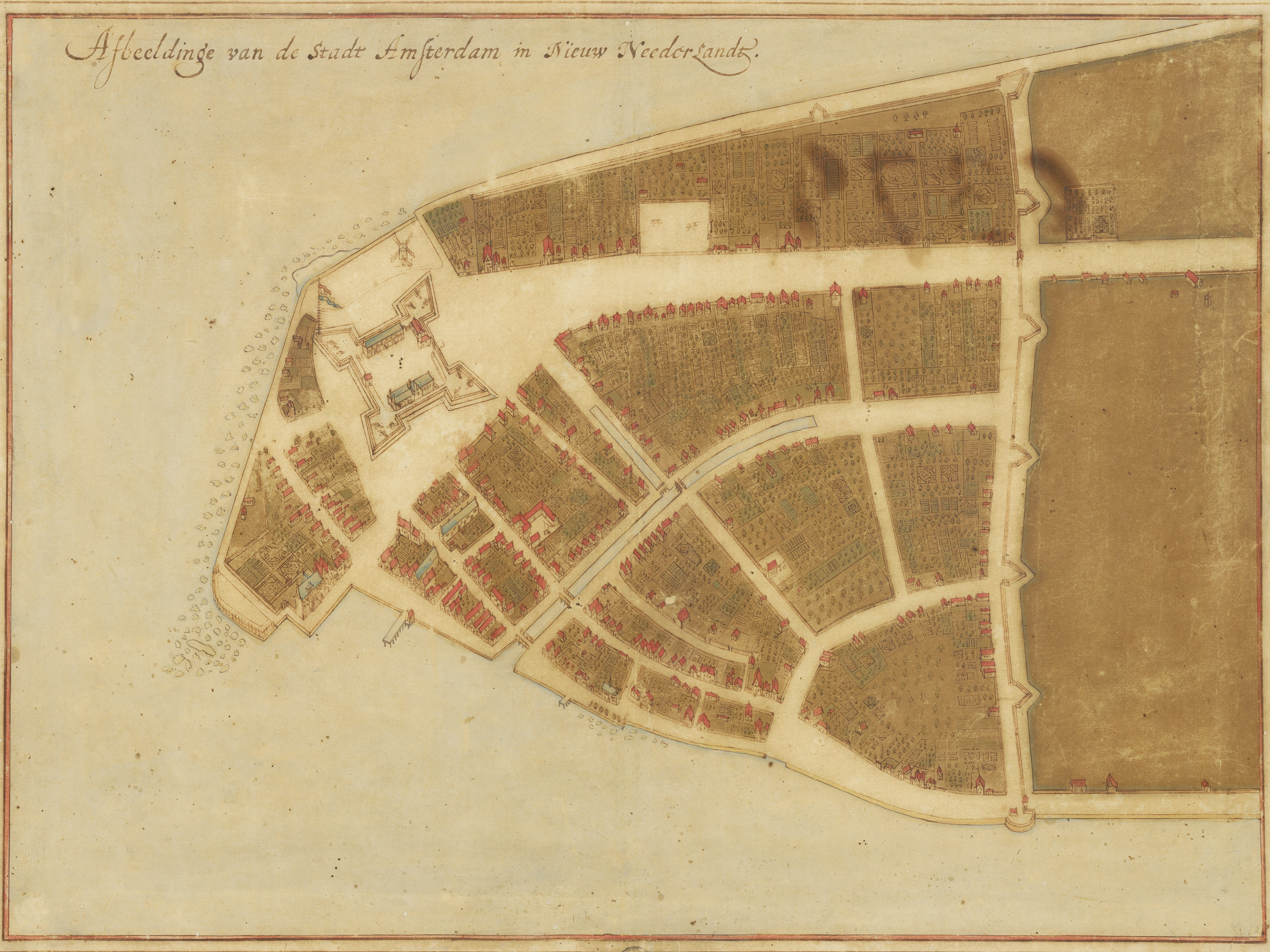
The Castello Plan, a 1660 map of New Amsterdam in Lower Manhattan

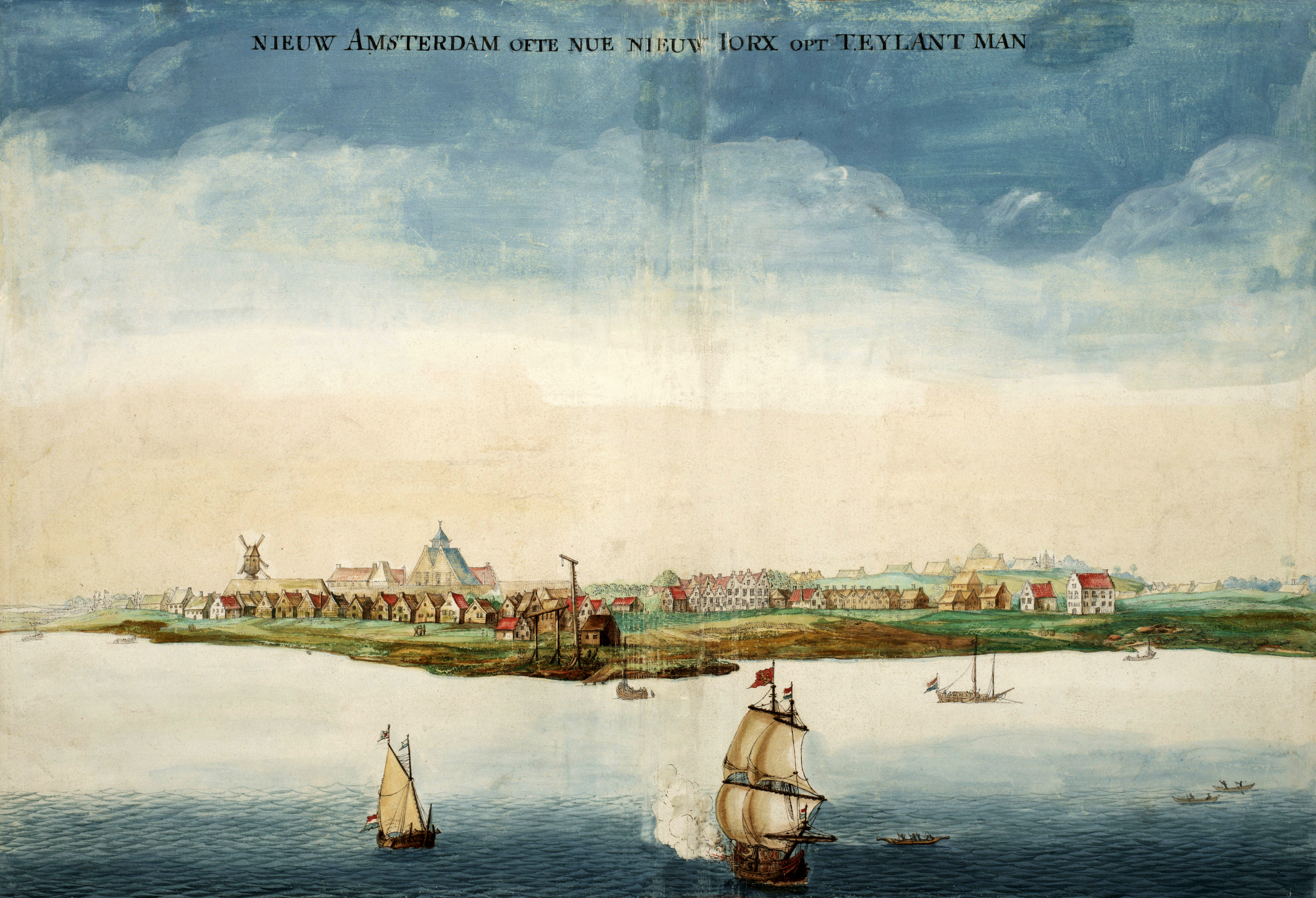
New Amsterdam, centered in what eventually became Lower Manhattan, in 1664, the year England took control and renamed it New York

A permanent European presence near New York Harbor was established in 1624, making New York the 12th-oldest continuously occupied European-established settlement in the continental United States, with the founding of a Dutch fur trading settlement on Governors Island. In 1625, construction began on a citadel and Fort Amsterdam, later called Nieuw Amsterdam (New Amsterdam), on present-day Manhattan Island.

The colony of New Amsterdam extended from the southern tip of Manhattan to modern-day Wall Street, where a 12-foot (3.7 m) wooden stockade was built in 1653 to protect against Native American and English raids. In 1626 Peter Minuit, the director of New Netherland, as charged by the Dutch West India Company, purchased the island of Manhattan from the Canarsie, a small Lenape band, for "the value of 60 guilders" (about $900 in 2018). A frequently told but disproved legend claims that Manhattan was purchased for $24 worth of glass beads.

Following the purchase, New Amsterdam grew slowly. To attract settlers, the Dutch instituted the patroon system in 1628, whereby wealthy Dutchmen (patroons, or patrons) who brought 50 colonists to New Netherland would be awarded land, local political autonomy, and rights to participate in the lucrative fur trade. This program had little success.

By the authority of a charter granted by the Dutch States General in June 1621, the Dutch West India Company established an exclusive monopoly over colonization and commerce in New Netherland. In 1639–1640, to bolster economic growth, it relinquished its fur trade monopoly, prompting a shift toward the production of food, timber, tobacco, and enslaved labor (particularly with the Dutch West Indies).

In 1647, Peter Stuyvesant began his tenure as the last director-general of New Netherland. During his tenure, the population of New Netherland grew from 2,000 to 8,000. Stuyvesant has been credited with improving law and order; however, he also earned a reputation as a despotic leader. He instituted regulations on liquor sales, attempted to assert control over the Dutch Reformed Church, and blocked other religious groups from establishing houses of worship.

=== English rule ===
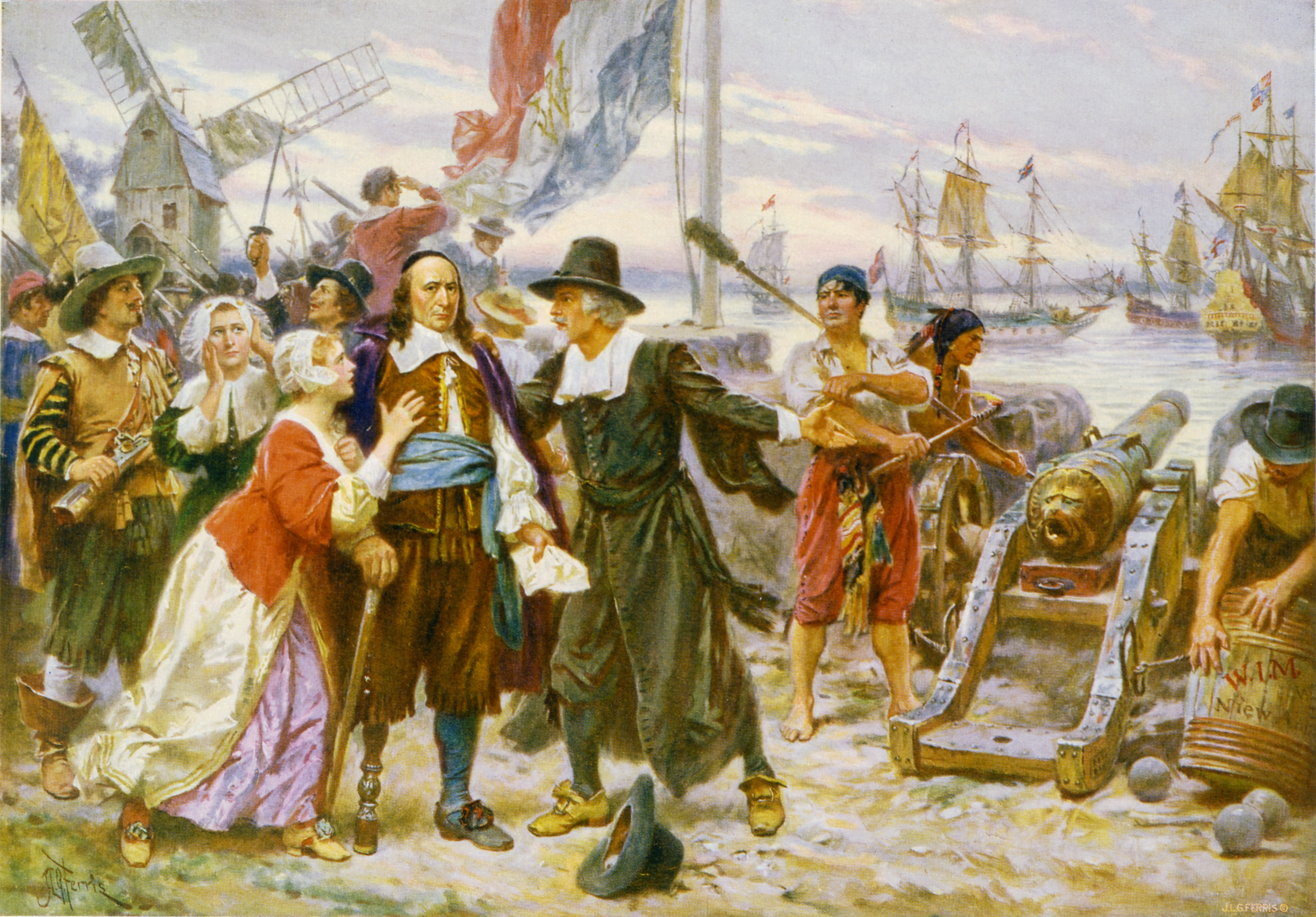
The Fall of New Amsterdam, painting by Jean Leon Gerome Ferris, depicting the Conquest of New Netherland

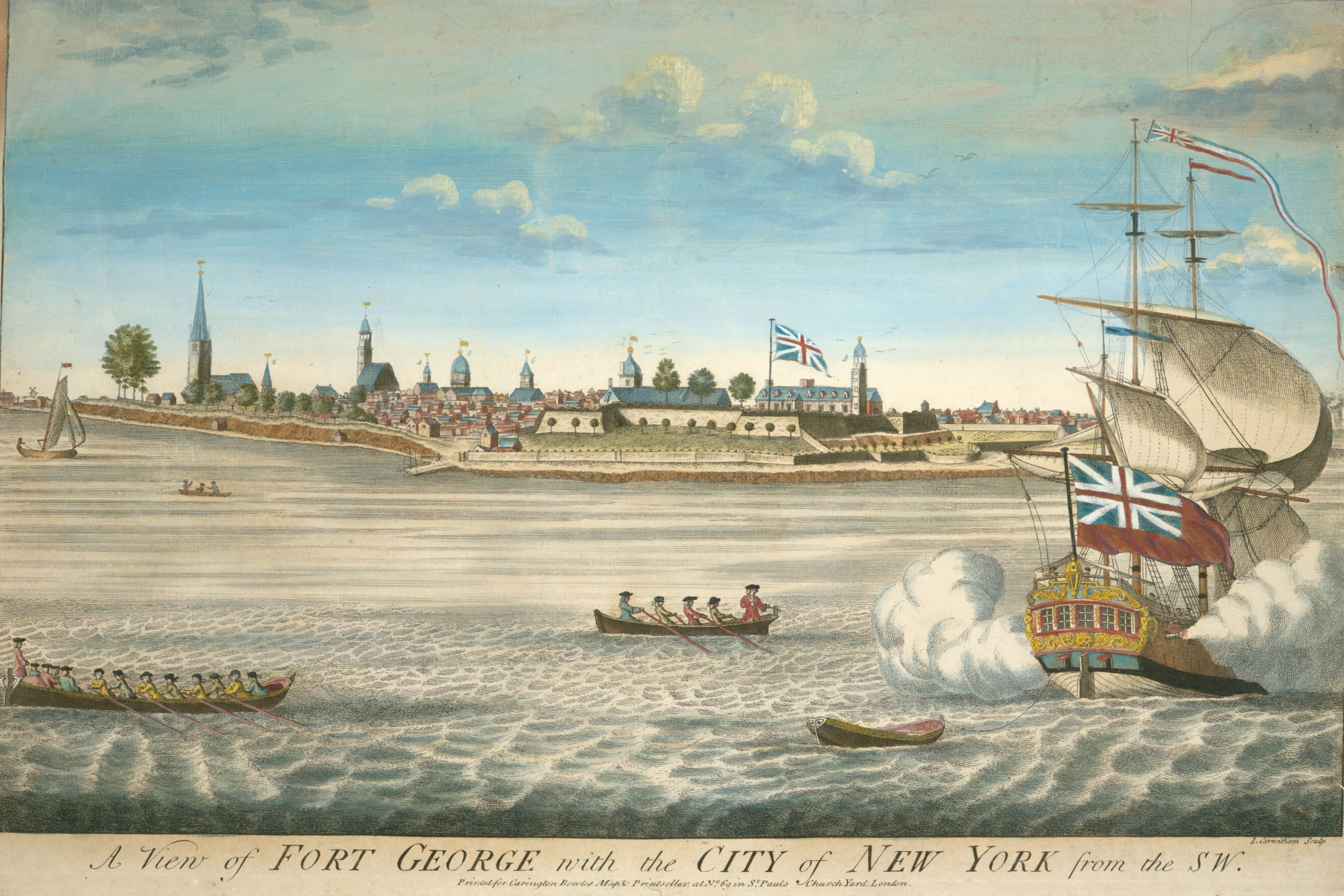
Fort George and New York with British warships, c. 1731

In 1664, unable to summon any significant resistance, Stuyvesant surrendered New Amsterdam to English troops, led by Colonel Richard Nicolls, without bloodshed. The terms of the surrender permitted Dutch residents to remain in the colony and allowed for religious freedom.

In 1667, during negotiations leading to the Treaty of Breda after the Second Anglo-Dutch War, the victorious Dutch decided to keep the nascent plantation colony of what is now Suriname, which they had gained from the English, and in return, the English kept New Amsterdam. The settlement was promptly renamed "New York" after the Duke of York (the future King James II and VII). The duke gave part of the colony to proprietors George Carteret and John Berkeley.

On August 24, 1673, during the Third Anglo-Dutch War, Anthony Colve of the Dutch navy seized New York at the behest of Cornelis Evertsen the Youngest and rechristened it "New Orange" after William III, the Prince of Orange. In November 1674, the Dutch returned the island to England under the Treaty of Westminster.

Several intertribal wars among the Native Americans and epidemics brought on by contact with the Europeans caused significant Lenape population losses between 1660 and 1670. By 1700, the Lenape population had diminished to 200. New York experienced several yellow fever epidemics in the 18th century, losing 10% of its population in 1702 alone.

In the early 18th century, New York grew in importance as a trading port within the surrounding colony. It became a center of slavery, with 42% of households enslaving Africans by 1730. Most were domestic slaves; others were hired out as labor. Slavery became integrally tied to New York's economy through the labor of slaves throughout the port, and the banking and shipping industries trading with the American South. During construction in Foley Square in the 1990s, the African Burying Ground was discovered; the cemetery included 10,000 to 20,000 graves of colonial-era Africans, some enslaved and some free.

The 1735 trial and acquittal in Manhattan of John Peter Zenger, who had been accused of seditious libel after criticizing colonial governor William Cosby, helped to establish freedom of the press in North America. In 1754, Columbia University was founded.

=== American Revolution ===
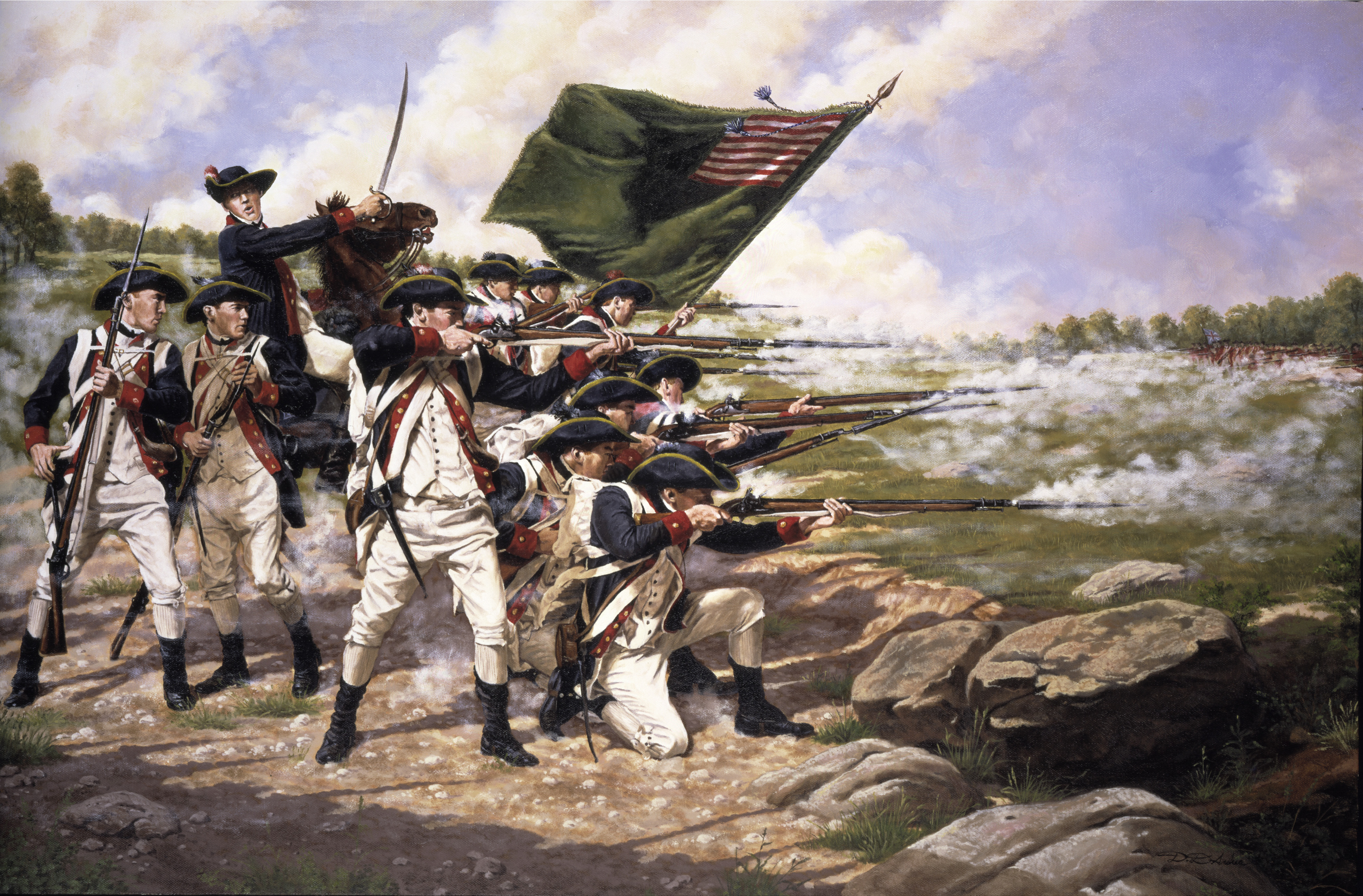
The Battle of Long Island, one of the largest battles of the American Revolutionary War, which took place in Brooklyn on August 27, 1776

The Stamp Act Congress met in New York in October 1765, as the Sons of Liberty organization emerged in the city and there were skirmishes over the next ten years with British troops stationed there. The Battle of Long Island, the largest battle of the American Revolutionary War, was fought in August 1776 within modern-day Brooklyn. A British rout of the Continental Army at the Battle of Fort Washington in November 1776 eliminated the last American stronghold in Manhattan, causing George Washington and his forces to retreat across the Hudson River to New Jersey, pursued by British forces.

After the battle, the British made New York their military and political base of operations in North America. The city was a haven for Loyalist refugees and escaped slaves who joined the British lines for freedom promised by the Crown, with as many as 10,000 escaped slaves crowded into the city during the British occupation, the largest such community on the continent. When the British forces evacuated New York at the close of the war in 1783, they transported thousands of freedmen for resettlement in Nova Scotia, England, and the Caribbean.

The attempt at a peaceful solution to the war took place at the Conference House on Staten Island between American delegates, including Benjamin Franklin, and British general Lord Howe on September 11, 1776. Shortly after the British occupation began, the Great Fire of New York destroyed nearly 500 buildings, about a quarter of the structures in the city, including Trinity Church.

=== Post-revolutionary period and early 19th century ===
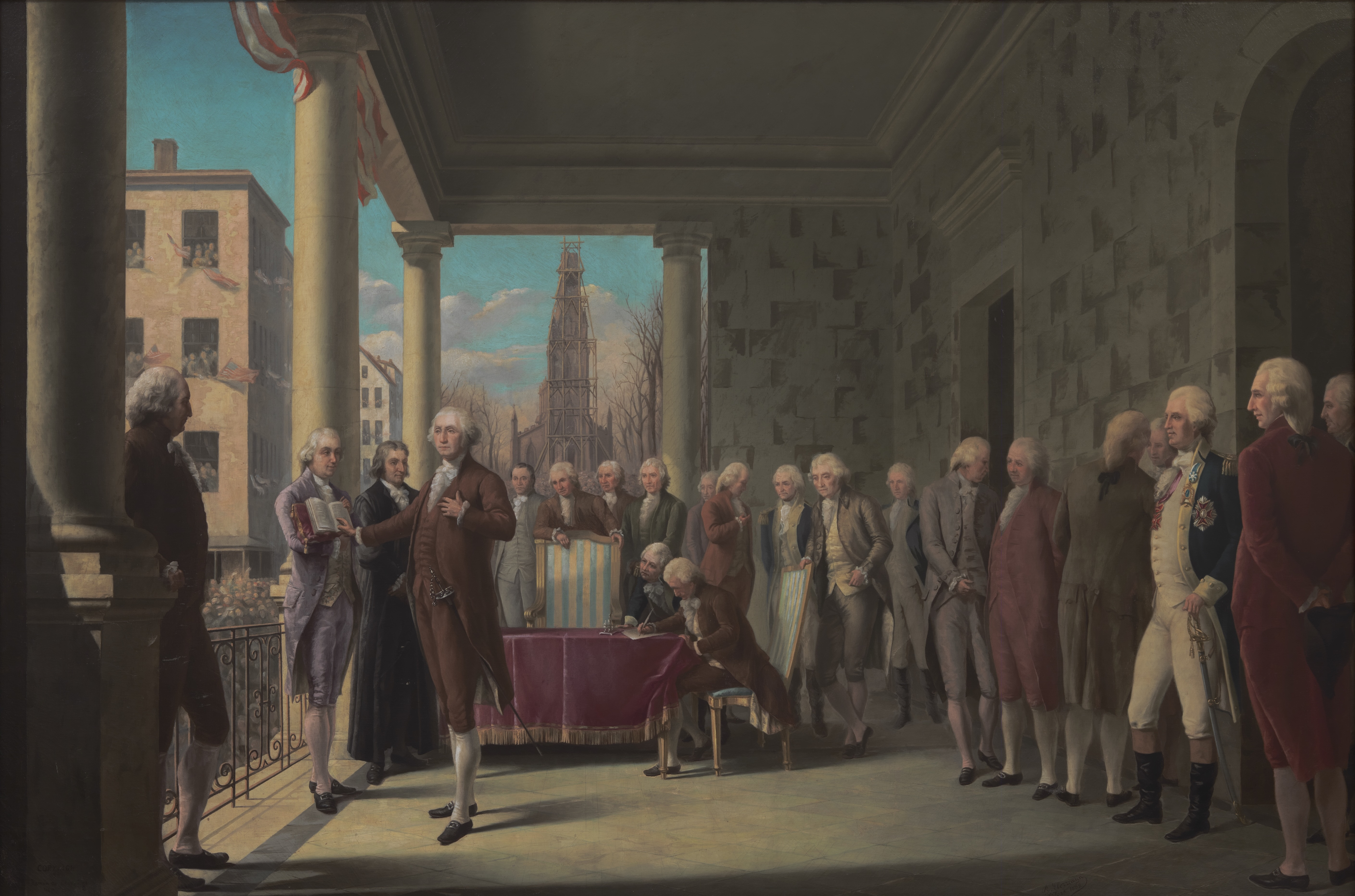
A portrait of the first inauguration of George Washington in 1789

In January 1785, the assembly of the Congress of the Confederation made New York City the national capital. New York was the last capital of the United States under the Articles of Confederation and the first under the Constitution. As the capital, New York City hosted the inauguration of the first President, George Washington, and the first Congress, at Federal Hall on Wall Street. Congress drafted the Bill of Rights there. The Supreme Court held its first organizational sessions in New York in 1790.

In 1790, for the first time, New York City surpassed Philadelphia as the nation's largest city. At the end of 1790, the capital of the United States was moved to Philadelphia, where it remained while Washington, D.C. was being constructed.

During the 19th century, New York City's population grew from 60,000 to 3.44 million. Under New York State's gradual emancipation act of 1799, children born to enslaved mothers were eventually liberated, but were legally required to serve as indentured servants until age 28 for males and age 25 for females. A significant free Black population gradually developed in Manhattan, made up of former slaves who had been freed by their masters after the American Revolutionary War, as well as escaped slaves. The New York Manumission Society worked for abolition and established the African Free School to educate Black children. It was not until 1827 that slavery was completely abolished in the state. Free Blacks struggled with discrimination, and interracial abolitionist activism continued. New York City's population jumped from 123,706 in 1820 (10,886 of whom were Black and of whom 518 were enslaved) to 312,720 by 1840 (16,359 of whom were Black).

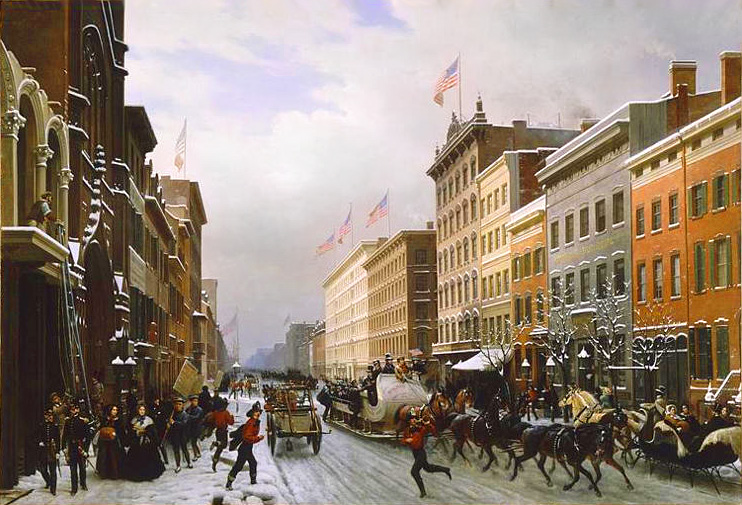
Broadway, which follows the Native American Wecquaesgeek Trail through Manhattan, 1840

In the 19th century, the city was transformed by both commercial and residential development relating to its status as a national and international trading center, as well as by European immigration. The city adopted the Commissioners' Plan of 1811, which expanded the city street grid to encompass almost all of Manhattan. The 1825 completion of the Erie Canal through central New York connected the Atlantic port to the agricultural markets and commodities of the North American interior via the Hudson River and the Great Lakes. Local politics became dominated by Tammany Hall, a political machine supported by Irish and German immigrants. In 1831, New York University was founded.

Several prominent American literary figures lived in New York during the 1830s and 1840s, including William Cullen Bryant, Washington Irving, Herman Melville, Rufus Wilmot Griswold, John Keese, Nathaniel Parker Willis, and Edgar Allan Poe. Members of the business elite lobbied for the establishment of Central Park, which opened in the winter of 1858 as the first landscaped park in an American city.

The Great Irish Famine brought a large influx of Irish immigrants, of whom more than 200,000 were living in New York by 1860, representing over a quarter of the city's population. Extensive immigration from the German provinces meant that Germans comprised another 25% of New York's population by 1860.

=== American Civil War ===
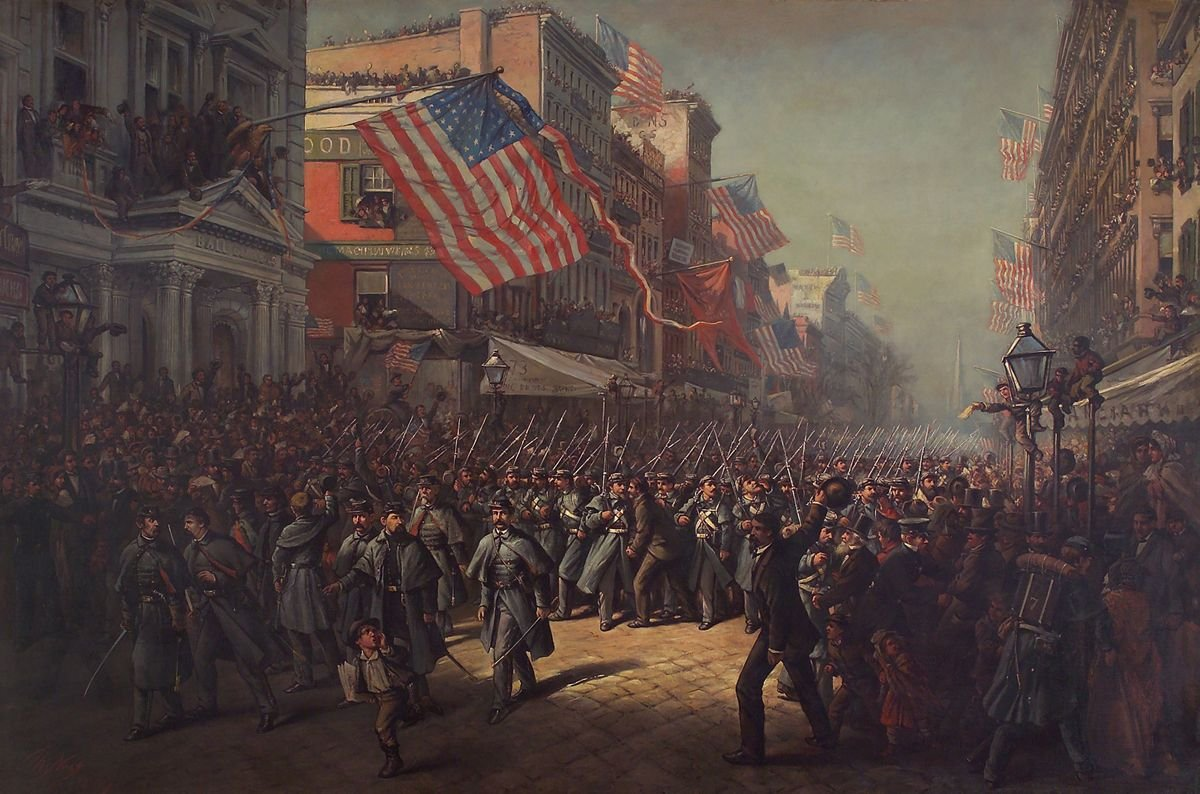
Departure of the 7th New York Militia Regiment for the defense of Washington, D.C., April 19, 1861

Democratic Party candidates were consistently elected to local office, increasing the city's ties to the South and its dominant party. In January 1861, in the wake of the Southern secession, New York City Mayor Fernando Wood proposed to the Common Council that the city secede from both the United States and the State of New York to become an independent "free city" that could maintain its lucrative cotton trade, but his proposal was not acted on. Anger at new military conscription laws during the American Civil War (1861–1865), which spared wealthier men who could afford to hire a substitute, led to the Draft Riots of 1863, whose most visible participants were ethnic Irish working class.

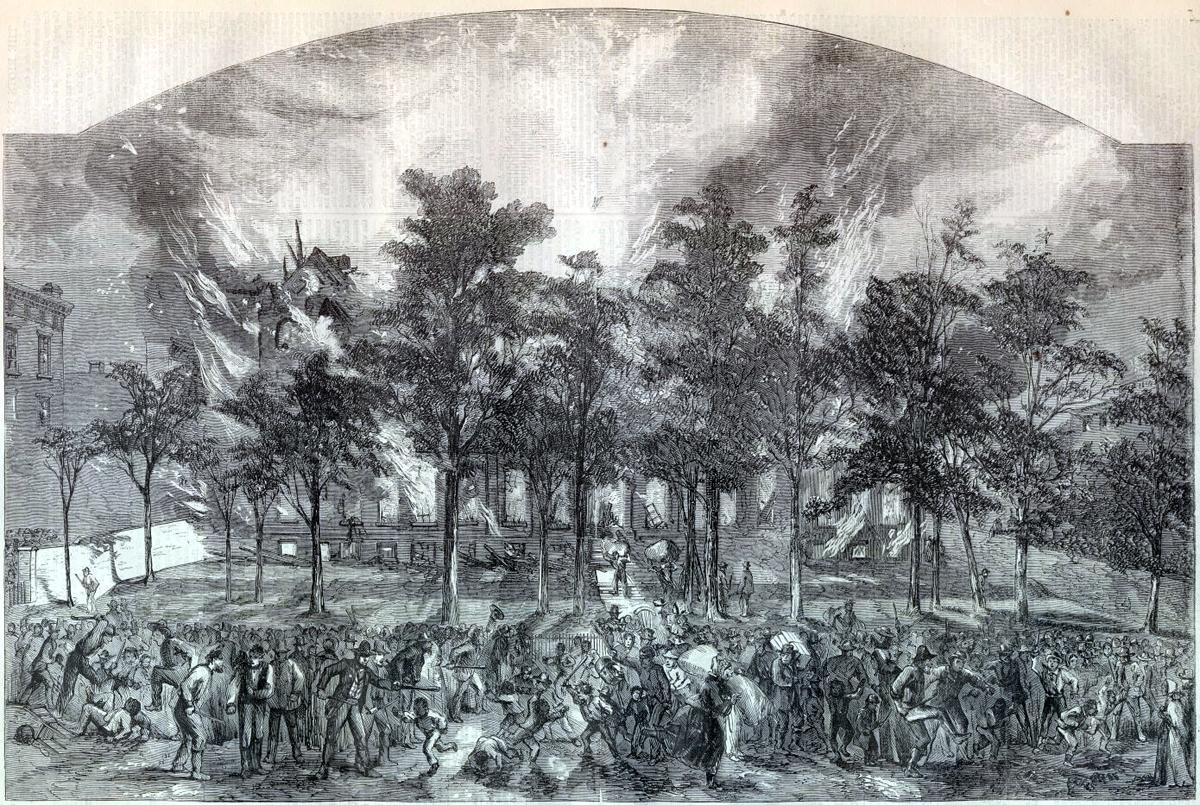
The Colored Orphan Asylum, looted and burned during the Draft Riots of 1863

The draft riots deteriorated into attacks on New York's elite, followed by attacks on Black New Yorkers after fierce competition for a decade between Irish immigrants and Black people for work. Rioters burned the Colored Orphan Asylum to the ground. At least 120 people were killed. Eleven Black men were lynched over five days, and the riots forced hundreds of Blacks to flee. The Black population in Manhattan fell below 10,000 by 1865. The White working class had established dominance. It was one of the worst incidents of civil unrest in American history.

=== Late 19th and early 20th century ===
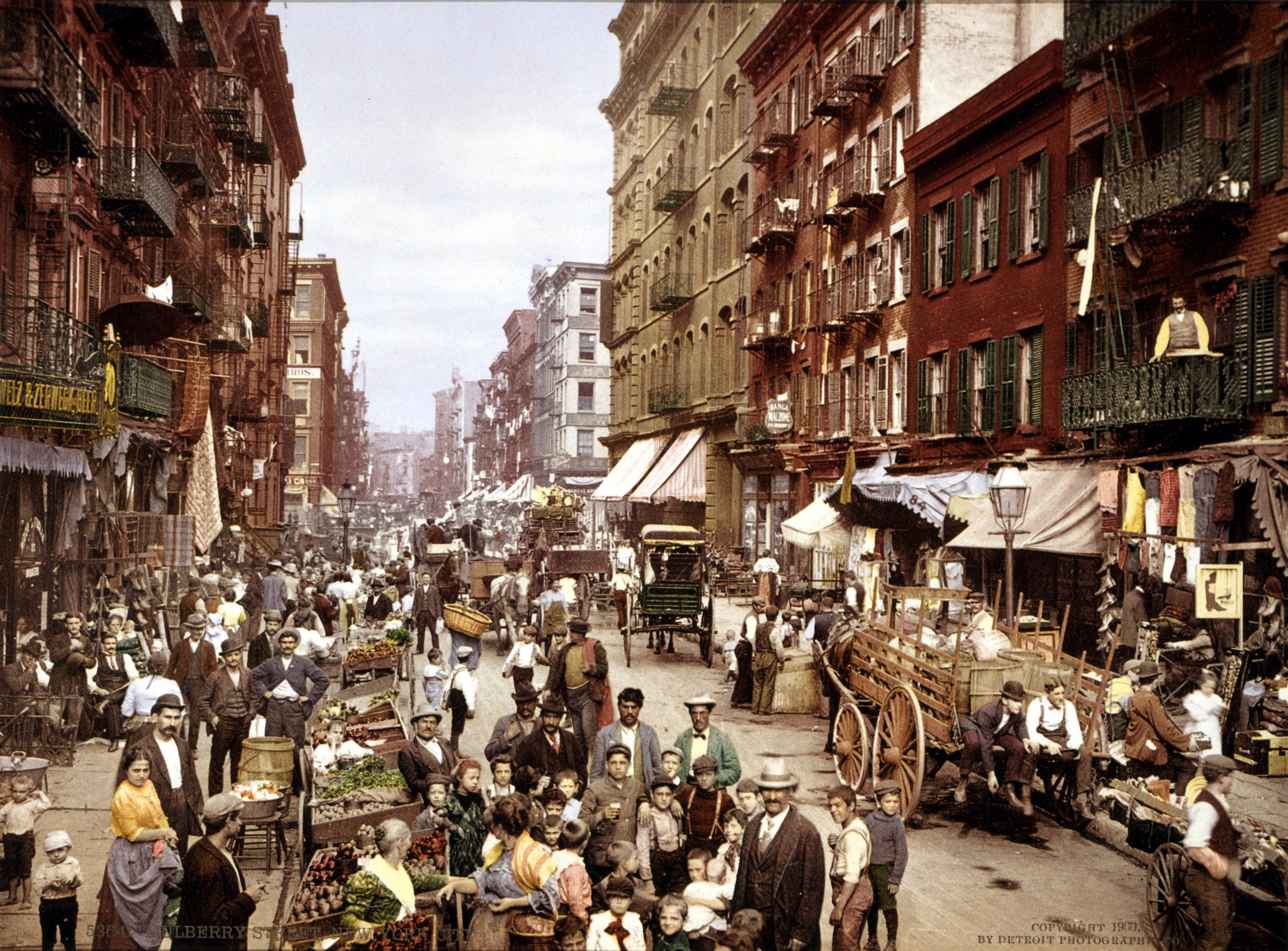
Manhattan's Little Italy c. 1900

In 1886, the Statue of Liberty, a gift from France, was dedicated in New York Harbor. The statue welcomed 14 million immigrants as they arrived via Ellis Island by ship in the late 19th and early 20th centuries, and is a symbol of the United States and American ideals of liberty and peace.

In 1898, the City of New York was formed with the consolidation of Brooklyn (until then a separate city), the County of New York (which then included parts of the Bronx), the County of Richmond, and the western portion of the County of Queens. The opening of the New York City Subway in 1904, first built as separate private systems, helped bind the consolidated city together. In the early 20th century, the city became a world center for industry, commerce, and communication.

In 1904, the steamship General Slocum caught fire in the East River, killing 1,021 people. In 1911, the Triangle Shirtwaist Factory fire, the city's worst industrial disaster, killed 146 garment workers and spurred the growth of the International Ladies' Garment Workers' Union and major improvements in building safety standards.

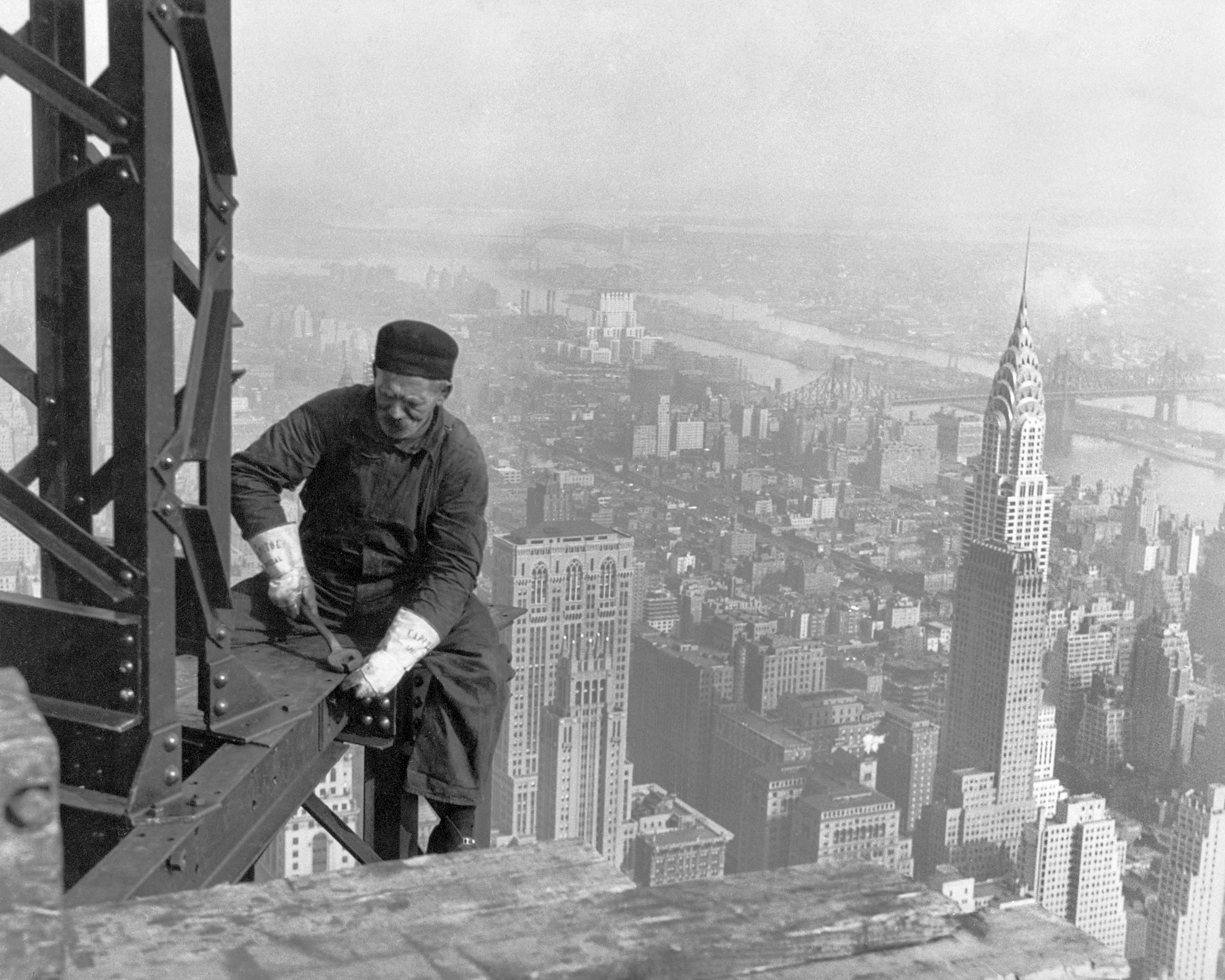
A construction worker atop the Empire State Building during its construction in 1930. The Chrysler Building is visible to the right.

New York's non-White population was 36,620 in 1890. New York City was a major destination in the early 20th century for Blacks during the Great Migration from the American South, and by 1916, New York City had the largest urban African diaspora in North America. The Harlem Renaissance of literary and cultural life flourished during the era of Prohibition. The larger economic boom generated the construction of skyscrapers competing in height.

New York City became the most populous urbanized area in the world in the early 1920s, overtaking London. The metropolitan area surpassed 10 million in the early 1930s, becoming the first megacity. The Great Depression saw the election of reformer Fiorello La Guardia as mayor and the fall of Tammany Hall after eighty years of political dominance.

Returning World War II veterans created a post-war economic boom and the development of large housing tracts in eastern Queens and Nassau County, with Wall Street leading America's place as the world's dominant economic power. The United Nations headquarters was completed in 1952, solidifying New York's global geopolitical influence, and the rise of abstract expressionism in the city precipitated New York's displacement of Paris as the center of the art world.

=== Late 20th and early 21st centuries ===
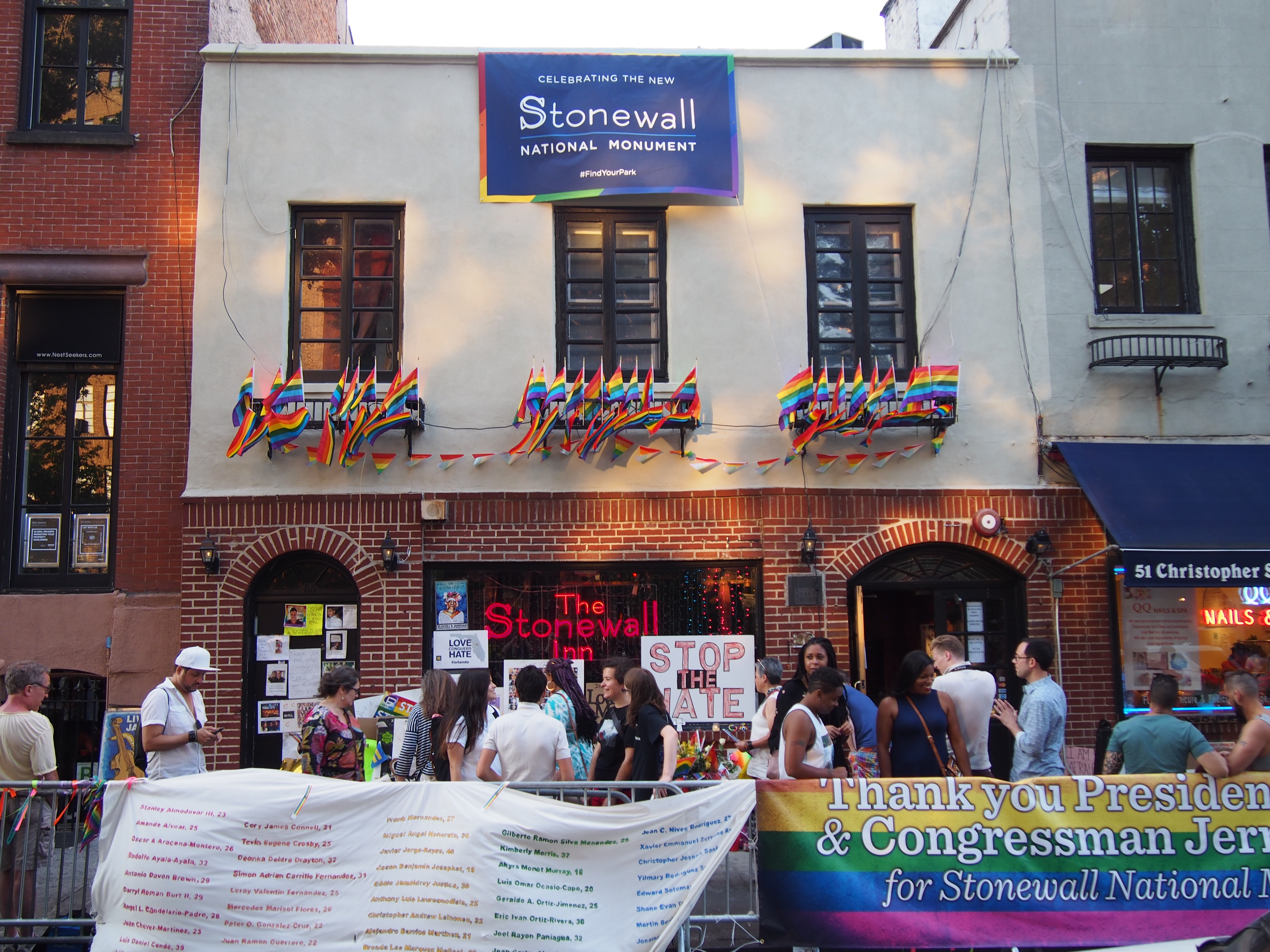
Stonewall Inn in Greenwich Village, the site of the June 1969 Stonewall riots and the cradle of the modern LGBTQ+ rights movement worldwide

In 1969, the Stonewall riots were a series of violent protests by members of the gay community against a police raid that took place in the early morning of June 28, 1969, at the Stonewall Inn in Greenwich Village. They are widely considered to be the single most important event leading to the gay liberation movement and the modern fight for LGBTQ+ rights. Wayne R. Dynes, author of the Encyclopedia of Homosexuality, wrote that drag queens were the only "transgender folks around" during the Stonewall riots. The transgender community in New York City played a significant role in fighting for LGBTQ+ equality.

October 1975 New York Daily News front page on President Ford's refusal to help the city avert bankruptcy

In the 1970s, job losses due to industrial restructuring caused New York City to suffer from economic problems and rising crime rates. Growing fiscal deficits in 1975 led the city to appeal to the federal government for financial aid, which President Gerald Ford denied in a speech paraphrased by New York Daily News as "FORD TO CITY: DROP DEAD". The Municipal Assistance Corporation was formed and granted oversight authority over the city's finances. While a resurgence in the financial industry improved the city's economic health in the 1980s, New York's crime rate continued to increase through that decade and into the beginning of the 1990s.

New York City's population passed 8 million for the first time in the 2000 census; further records were set in the 2010 and 2020 censuses. Important new economic sectors, such as Silicon Alley, emerged. The year 2000 was celebrated with fanfare in Times Square.

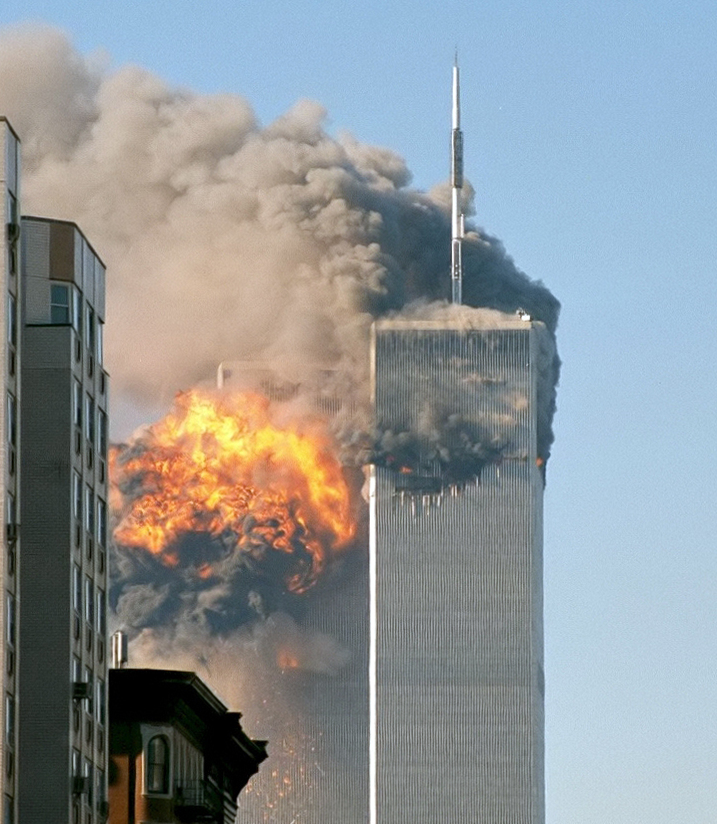
The World Trade Center, in Lower Manhattan, during the September 11 attacks in 2001

New York City suffered the bulk of the economic damage and the largest loss of human life in the aftermath of the September 11 attacks in 2001. Two of the four hijacked airliners were flown into the Twin Towers of the World Trade Center, resulting in the collapse of both buildings and the deaths of 2,753 people, including 343 first responders from the New York City Fire Department and 71 law enforcement officers.

The area was rebuilt with a new World Trade Center, the National September 11 Memorial and Museum, and other new buildings and infrastructure, including the World Trade Center Transportation Hub, the city's third-largest hub. The new One World Trade Center is the tallest skyscraper in the Western Hemisphere and the world's seventh-tallest building by pinnacle height, with its spire reaching a symbolic 1,776 feet (541.3 m), a reference to the year of American independence.

The Occupy Wall Street protests in Zuccotti Park in the Financial District of Lower Manhattan began on September 17, 2011, receiving global attention and popularizing the Occupy movement against social and economic inequality worldwide.

New York City was heavily impacted by Hurricane Sandy in October 2012. At least 43 people died in New York City as a result of Sandy, and the economic losses in New York City were estimated at $19 billion. Flooding led to a days-long shutdown of the subway system, and the first weather-related closure of the New York Stock Exchange since the Great Blizzard of 1888. The resulting long-term damage to multiple subway and road tunnels spawned long-term efforts towards infrastructural projects to counter climate change and rising seas, including $15 billion in federal funding received through 2022 towards those resiliency efforts.

In March 2020, the first case of COVID-19 in the city was confirmed. With its population density and extensive exposure to global travelers, the city rapidly replaced Wuhan, China as the global epicenter of the pandemic during the early phase, straining the city's healthcare infrastructure. Through March 2023, New York City recorded more than 80,000 deaths from COVID-19-related complications.

== Geography ==
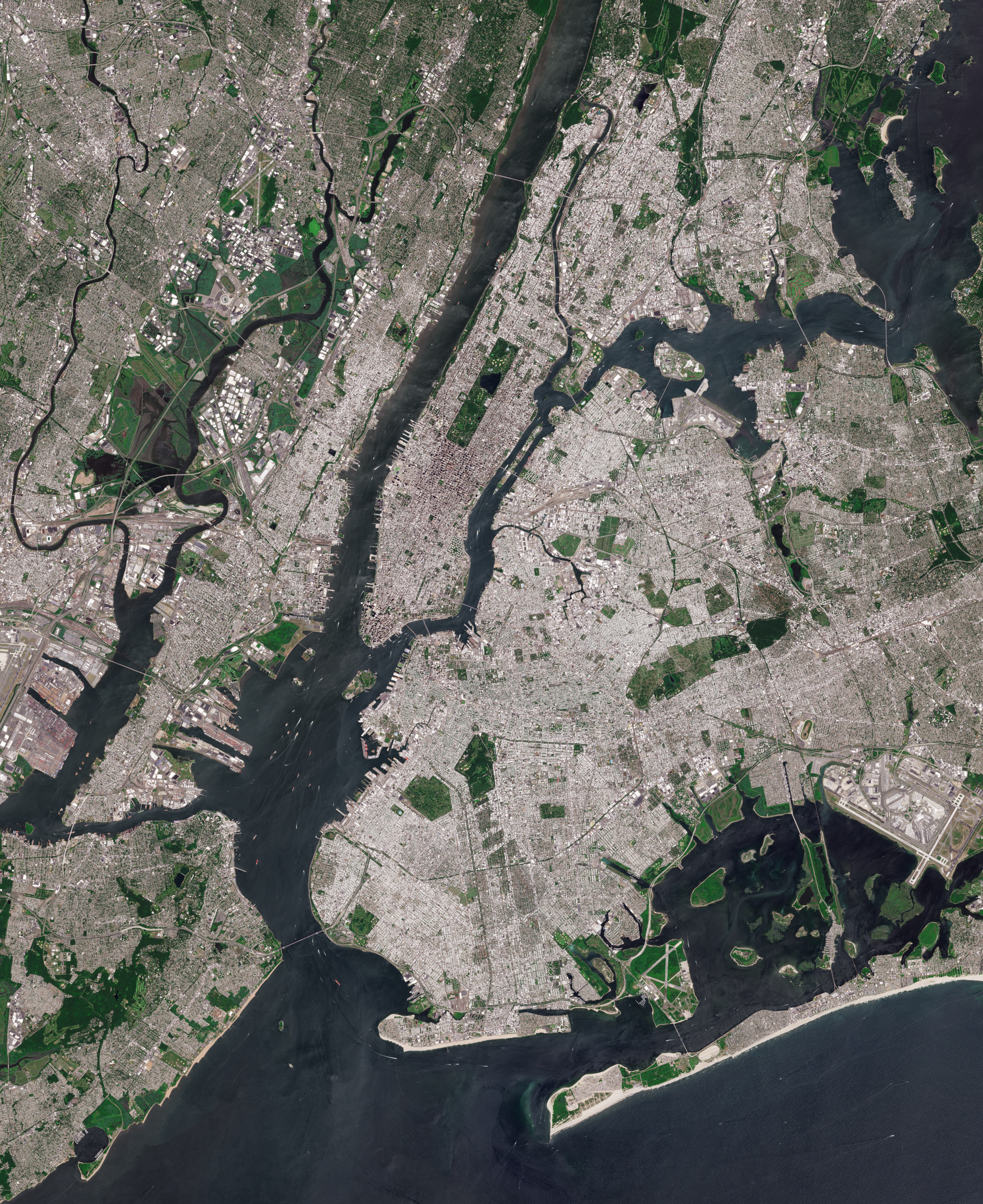
Aerial view of the New York City metropolitan area with Manhattan at its center

New York City lies in the northeastern United States, in southeastern New York State, approximately halfway between Washington, D.C. and Boston. Its location at the mouth of the Hudson River, which feeds into a naturally sheltered harbor and then into the Atlantic Ocean, has helped the city become a significant trading port. Most of the city is built on the three islands of Long Island, Manhattan, and Staten Island.

During the Wisconsin glaciation, 75,000 to 11,000 years ago, the New York City area was situated at the edge of a large ice sheet. The erosive forward movement of the ice (and its subsequent retreat) contributed to the separation of what is now Long Island and Staten Island. That action left bedrock at a relatively shallow depth, providing a solid foundation for most of Manhattan's skyscrapers.

The Hudson River flows through the Hudson Valley into New York Bay. Between New York City and Troy, New York, the river is an estuary. The Hudson River separates the city from New Jersey. The East River—a tidal strait—flows from Long Island Sound and separates the Bronx and Manhattan from Long Island. The Harlem River, another tidal strait between the East and Hudson rivers, separates most of Manhattan from the Bronx. The Bronx River, which flows through the Bronx and Westchester County, is the only entirely freshwater river in the city.

The city's land has been altered substantially by human intervention, with considerable land reclamation along the waterfronts since Dutch colonial times; reclamation is most prominent in Lower Manhattan, with developments such as Battery Park City in the 1970s and 1980s. Some of the natural relief in topography has been evened out, especially in Manhattan.

The city's total area is 468.484 square miles (1,213.37 km^{2}). 302.643 sq mi (783.84 km^{2}) of the city is land and 165.841 sq mi (429.53 km^{2}) of it is water. The highest point in the city is Todt Hill on Staten Island, which, at 409.8 feet (124.9 m) above sea level, is the highest point on the eastern seaboard south of Maine. The summit of the ridge is mostly covered in woodlands as part of the Staten Island Greenbelt.

=== Boroughs ===
1. Manhattan (New York County); 2. Brooklyn (Kings County); 3. Queens (Queens County); 4. The Bronx (Bronx County); 5. Staten Island (Richmond County)

New York City is sometimes referred to collectively as the Five Boroughs. Each borough is coextensive with a respective county of New York State, making New York City one of the U.S. municipalities in multiple counties.

Manhattan (New York County) is the geographically smallest and most densely populated borough. It is home to Central Park and most of the city's skyscrapers, and is sometimes known regionally as The City. Manhattan's population density of 70,450.8 inhabitants per square mile (27,201.2/km^{2}) in 2022 makes it the highest of any county in the United States and higher than the density of any individual American city. Manhattan is the cultural, administrative, and financial center of New York City and contains the headquarters of many major multinational corporations, the United Nations headquarters, Wall Street, and many important universities. The borough is often described as the financial and cultural center of the world.

Brooklyn (Kings County), on the western tip of Long Island, is the city's most populous borough. Brooklyn is known for its cultural, social, and ethnic diversity, an independent music and art scene, distinct neighborhoods, and a distinctive architectural heritage. Downtown Brooklyn is the largest central core neighborhood in the Outer Boroughs. The borough has a long beachfront shoreline including Coney Island, established in the 1870s as one of the earliest amusement grounds in the United States Marine Park and Prospect Park are the two largest parks in Brooklyn. Since 2010, Brooklyn has evolved into a hub of entrepreneurship and high technology startup firms, and of postmodern art and design. Brooklyn is also home to Fort Hamilton, the U.S. military's only active duty installation within New York City, aside from Coast Guard operations. The facility was established in 1825 on the site of a battery used during the American Revolution, and it is one of America's longest-serving military forts.

Queens (Queens County), on Long Island north and east of Brooklyn, is geographically the largest borough, the most ethnically diverse county in the United States, and the most ethnically diverse urban area in the world. Queens is the site of the Citi Field, home of the New York Mets, and hosts the annual US Open tennis tournament at the USTA Billie Jean King National Tennis Center in Flushing Meadows–Corona Park, with plans to build Etihad Park, a soccer-specific stadium for New York City FC. Additionally, two of the three busiest airports serving the New York metropolitan area, John F. Kennedy International Airport and LaGuardia Airport, are in Queens.

The Bronx (Bronx County) is both New York City's northernmost borough and the only one that is mostly on the U.S. mainland. It is the location of Yankee Stadium, the baseball park of the New York Yankees, and home to the largest cooperatively-owned housing complex in the United States, Co-op City. It is home to the Bronx Zoo, the world's largest metropolitan zoo, which spans 265 acres (1.07 km^{2}) and houses more than 6,000 animals. The Bronx is the birthplace of hip-hop and its associated culture. Pelham Bay Park is the largest park in New York City, at 2,772 acres (1,122 ha).

Staten Island (Richmond County) is the most suburban in character of the five boroughs. It is connected to Brooklyn by the Verrazzano–Narrows Bridge, and to Manhattan by way of the free Staten Island Ferry. Staten Island is known as the "Borough of Parks" and "the Greenest Borough" due to its 12,300 acres of protected parkland and over 170 parks. In central Staten Island, the Staten Island Greenbelt spans approximately 2,500 acres (10 km^{2}), including 28 miles (45 km) of walking trails and one of the last undisturbed forests in the city. Designated in 1984 to protect the island's natural lands, the Greenbelt comprises seven city parks. It also contains environmental centers for educational and recreational purposes.

=== Climate ===
New York

Climate chart (precipitation, max. and min. temperature)
J	F	M	A	M	J	J	A	S	O	N	D
3.6 40 28	3.2 42 30	4.3 50 36	4.1 62 46	4 71 55	4.5 80 64	4.6 85 70	4.6 83 69	4.3 76 62	4.4 65 51	3.6 54 42	4.4 44 34
- █ Average max. and min. temperatures in °F
- █ Precipitation totals in inches
- Source: "New York City Weatherbox NOAA"
Metric conversion
J	F	M	A	M	J	J	A	S	O	N	D
92 4 −2	81 6 −1	109 10 2	104 17 8	101 22 13	115 27 18	117 29 21	116 29 21	109 25 17	111 18 11	91 12 6	111 7 1
- █ Average max. and min. temperatures in °C
- █ Precipitation totals in mm

Under the Köppen climate classification, New York City has a humid subtropical climate (Cfa) and is the northernmost major city on the North American continent with this categorization. The suburbs to the immediate north and west are in the transitional zone between humid subtropical and humid continental climates (Dfa). The city receives an average of 49.5 inches (1,260 mm) of precipitation annually, which is relatively evenly spread throughout the year. New York averages over 2,500 hours of sunshine annually.

Winters are chilly and damp, and prevailing wind patterns that blow sea breezes offshore temper the moderating effects of the Atlantic Ocean. The Atlantic and the partial shielding from colder air by the Appalachian Mountains keep the city warmer in the winter than inland North American cities at similar or even lower latitudes. The daily mean temperature in January, the area's coldest month, is 33.3 °F (0.7 °C). Temperatures usually drop to 10 °F (−12 °C) several times per winter, and can reach 60 °F (16 °C) for several days even in the coldest winter month. Spring and autumn are unpredictable and can range from cool to warm, although they are usually mild with low humidity. Summers are typically hot and humid, with a daily mean temperature of 77.5 °F (25.3 °C) in July.

Nighttime temperatures are 9.5 °F (5.3 °C) degrees higher for the average city resident due to the urban heat island effect, caused by paved streets and tall buildings. Daytime temperatures exceed 90 °F (32 °C) on average of 17 days each summer and in some years exceed 100 °F (38 °C), although this is rare; the most recent occurrence was measured at Belvedere Castle in Central Park on July 2, 2026, which was the first time since 2012. Readings of 0 °F (−18 °C) are extremely rare, last occurring on February 14, 2016.

Extreme temperatures have ranged from 106 °F (41 °C), recorded on July 9, 1936, down to −15 °F (−26 °C) on February 9, 1934. The coldest recorded wind chill was −37 °F (−38 °C) on the same day as the all-time record low. The average winter snowfall between 1991 and 2020 was 29.8 inches (76 cm). This varies considerably between years. The record cold daily maximum was 2 °F (−17 °C) on December 30, 1917. The record warm daily minimum was 87 °F (31 °C), on July 2, 1903. The average water temperature of the nearby Atlantic Ocean ranges from 39.7 °F (4.3 °C) in February, to 74.1 °F (23.4 °C) in August. The New York metropolitan area's coastline constitutes one of the fastest-warming urban ocean shorelines in the world.

Hurricanes and tropical storms are rare in the New York area. Hurricane Sandy brought a destructive storm surge to New York City on the evening of October 29, 2012, flooding numerous streets, tunnels, and subway lines in Lower Manhattan and other areas of the city and cutting off electricity in many parts of the city and its suburbs. The storm and its profound impacts have prompted the discussion of constructing seawalls and other coastal barriers around the shorelines of the city and the metropolitan area to minimize the risk of destructive consequences from another such event in the future.

Climate data for New York (Belvedere Castle, Central Park), 1991–2020 normals, (Note: Mean monthly maxima and minima (i.e. the expected highest and lowest temperature readings at any point during the year or given month) calculated based on data at said location from 1991 to 2020) extremes 1869–present (Note: Official weather observations for Central Park were conducted at the Arsenal at Fifth Avenue and 64th Street from 1869 to 1919, and at Belvedere Castle since 1919.)
Month	Jan	Feb	Mar	Apr	May	Jun	Jul	Aug	Sep	Oct	Nov	Dec	Year
Record high °F (°C)	72 (22)	78 (26)	86 (30)	96 (36)	99 (37)	101 (38)	106 (41)	104 (40)	102 (39)	94 (34)	84 (29)	75 (24)	106 (41)
Mean maximum °F (°C)	60.4 (15.8)	60.7 (15.9)	70.3 (21.3)	82.9 (28.3)	88.5 (31.4)	92.1 (33.4)	95.7 (35.4)	93.4 (34.1)	89.0 (31.7)	79.7 (26.5)	70.7 (21.5)	62.9 (17.2)	97.0 (36.1)
Mean daily maximum °F (°C)	39.5 (4.2)	42.2 (5.7)	49.9 (9.9)	61.8 (16.6)	71.4 (21.9)	79.7 (26.5)	84.9 (29.4)	83.3 (28.5)	76.2 (24.6)	64.5 (18.1)	54.0 (12.2)	44.3 (6.8)	62.6 (17.0)
Daily mean °F (°C)	33.7 (0.9)	35.9 (2.2)	42.8 (6.0)	53.7 (12.1)	63.2 (17.3)	72.0 (22.2)	77.5 (25.3)	76.1 (24.5)	69.2 (20.7)	57.9 (14.4)	48.0 (8.9)	39.1 (3.9)	55.8 (13.2)
Mean daily minimum °F (°C)	27.9 (−2.3)	29.5 (−1.4)	35.8 (2.1)	45.5 (7.5)	55.0 (12.8)	64.4 (18.0)	70.1 (21.2)	68.9 (20.5)	62.3 (16.8)	51.4 (10.8)	42.0 (5.6)	33.8 (1.0)	48.9 (9.4)
Mean minimum °F (°C)	9.8 (−12.3)	12.7 (−10.7)	19.7 (−6.8)	32.8 (0.4)	43.9 (6.6)	52.7 (11.5)	61.8 (16.6)	60.3 (15.7)	50.2 (10.1)	38.4 (3.6)	27.7 (−2.4)	18.0 (−7.8)	7.7 (−13.5)
Record low °F (°C)	−6 (−21)	−15 (−26)	3 (−16)	12 (−11)	32 (0)	44 (7)	52 (11)	50 (10)	39 (4)	28 (−2)	5 (−15)	−13 (−25)	−15 (−26)
Average precipitation inches (mm)	3.64 (92)	3.19 (81)	4.29 (109)	4.09 (104)	3.96 (101)	4.54 (115)	4.60 (117)	4.56 (116)	4.31 (109)	4.38 (111)	3.58 (91)	4.38 (111)	49.52 (1,258)
Average snowfall inches (cm)	8.8 (22)	10.1 (26)	5.0 (13)	0.4 (1.0)	0.0 (0.0)	0.0 (0.0)	0.0 (0.0)	0.0 (0.0)	0.0 (0.0)	0.1 (0.25)	0.5 (1.3)	4.9 (12)	29.8 (76)
Average precipitation days (≥ 0.01 in)	10.8	10.0	11.1	11.4	11.5	11.2	10.5	10.0	8.8	9.5	9.2	11.4	125.4
Average snowy days (≥ 0.1 in)	3.7	3.2	2.0	0.2	0.0	0.0	0.0	0.0	0.0	0.0	0.2	2.1	11.4
Average relative humidity (%)	61.5	60.2	58.5	55.3	62.7	65.2	64.2	66.0	67.8	65.6	64.6	64.1	63.0
Average dew point °F (°C)	18.0 (−7.8)	19.0 (−7.2)	25.9 (−3.4)	34.0 (1.1)	47.3 (8.5)	57.4 (14.1)	61.9 (16.6)	62.1 (16.7)	55.6 (13.1)	44.1 (6.7)	34.0 (1.1)	24.6 (−4.1)	40.3 (4.6)
Mean monthly sunshine hours	162.7	163.1	212.5	225.6	256.6	257.3	268.2	268.2	219.3	211.2	151.0	139.0	2,534.7
Percentage possible sunshine	54	55	57	57	57	57	59	63	59	61	51	48	57
Average ultraviolet index	2	3	4	6	7	8	8	8	6	4	2	1	5
Source: NOAA (relative humidity and sun 1961–1990; dew point 1965–1984)

Climate data for JFK Airport, New York (1991–2020 normals, (Note: Mean monthly maxima and minima (i.e. the expected highest and lowest temperature readings at any point during the year or given month) calculated based on data at said location from 1991 to 2020.) extremes 1948–present)
Month	Jan	Feb	Mar	Apr	May	Jun	Jul	Aug	Sep	Oct	Nov	Dec	Year
Record high °F (°C)	71 (22)	71 (22)	85 (29)	90 (32)	99 (37)	102 (39)	104 (40)	101 (38)	98 (37)	95 (35)	82 (28)	75 (24)	104 (40)
Mean maximum °F (°C)	57.7 (14.3)	58.3 (14.6)	67.5 (19.7)	77.9 (25.5)	85.6 (29.8)	92.4 (33.6)	95.2 (35.1)	91.9 (33.3)	87.9 (31.1)	79.7 (26.5)	68.9 (20.5)	60.6 (15.9)	96.8 (36.0)
Mean daily maximum °F (°C)	39.5 (4.2)	41.7 (5.4)	48.7 (9.3)	58.8 (14.9)	68.4 (20.2)	78.0 (25.6)	83.6 (28.7)	82.2 (27.9)	75.8 (24.3)	64.7 (18.2)	53.8 (12.1)	44.5 (6.9)	61.6 (16.4)
Daily mean °F (°C)	32.8 (0.4)	34.5 (1.4)	41.1 (5.1)	50.9 (10.5)	60.5 (15.8)	70.2 (21.2)	76.1 (24.5)	75.0 (23.9)	68.4 (20.2)	57.2 (14.0)	46.8 (8.2)	38.3 (3.5)	54.3 (12.4)
Mean daily minimum °F (°C)	26.2 (−3.2)	27.4 (−2.6)	33.6 (0.9)	42.9 (6.1)	52.5 (11.4)	62.4 (16.9)	68.7 (20.4)	67.8 (19.9)	61.0 (16.1)	49.8 (9.9)	39.8 (4.3)	32.0 (0.0)	47.0 (8.3)
Mean minimum °F (°C)	10.2 (−12.1)	13.3 (−10.4)	20.2 (−6.6)	32.6 (0.3)	42.9 (6.1)	52.6 (11.4)	62.8 (17.1)	60.1 (15.6)	50.0 (10.0)	37.9 (3.3)	26.9 (−2.8)	18.6 (−7.4)	8.2 (−13.2)
Record low °F (°C)	−2 (−19)	−2 (−19)	7 (−14)	20 (−7)	34 (1)	45 (7)	55 (13)	46 (8)	40 (4)	30 (−1)	15 (−9)	2 (−17)	−2 (−19)
Average precipitation inches (mm)	3.23 (82)	2.76 (70)	3.94 (100)	3.55 (90)	3.66 (93)	3.85 (98)	3.86 (98)	4.11 (104)	3.58 (91)	3.72 (94)	3.07 (78)	3.96 (101)	43.29 (1,100)
Average snowfall inches (cm)	7.5 (19)	8.6 (22)	4.3 (11)	0.6 (1.5)	0.0 (0.0)	0.0 (0.0)	0.0 (0.0)	0.0 (0.0)	0.0 (0.0)	0.0 (0.0)	0.4 (1.0)	4.5 (11)	25.9 (66)
Average precipitation days (≥ 0.01 inch)	10.7	9.8	10.8	11.4	11.8	10.6	9.4	9.0	8.2	9.4	8.9	11.2	121.2
Average snowy days (≥ 0.1 in)	4.6	3.8	2.5	0.3	0.0	0.0	0.0	0.0	0.0	0.0	0.2	2.6	14.0
Average relative humidity (%)	64.9	64.4	63.4	64.1	69.5	71.5	71.4	71.7	71.9	69.1	67.9	66.3	68.0
Source: NOAA (relative humidity 1961–1990)

Climate data for New York LaGuardia Airport, NY (1991-2020 normals, extremes 1939-present)
Month	Jan	Feb	Mar	Apr	May	Jun	Jul	Aug	Sep	Oct	Nov	Dec	Year
Record high °F (°C)	72 (22)	79 (26)	86 (30)	94 (34)	97 (36)	101 (38)	107 (42)	104 (40)	102 (39)	95 (35)	83 (28)	75 (24)	107 (42)
Mean maximum °F (°C)	60.2 (15.7)	60.0 (15.6)	69.3 (20.7)	81.7 (27.6)	89.3 (31.8)	94.1 (34.5)	97.4 (36.3)	94.7 (34.8)	89.6 (32.0)	81.2 (27.3)	70.9 (21.6)	62.8 (17.1)	98.7 (37.1)
Mean daily maximum °F (°C)	40.2 (4.6)	42.7 (5.9)	49.9 (9.9)	61.3 (16.3)	71.8 (22.1)	81.1 (27.3)	86.4 (30.2)	84.5 (29.2)	77.2 (25.1)	66.0 (18.9)	55.0 (12.8)	45.4 (7.4)	63.5 (17.5)
Daily mean °F (°C)	34.4 (1.3)	36.3 (2.4)	43.1 (6.2)	53.6 (12.0)	63.7 (17.6)	73.4 (23.0)	79.2 (26.2)	77.7 (25.4)	70.8 (21.6)	59.6 (15.3)	49.1 (9.5)	40.0 (4.4)	56.8 (13.8)
Mean daily minimum °F (°C)	28.6 (−1.9)	29.9 (−1.2)	36.2 (2.3)	46.0 (7.8)	55.7 (13.2)	65.7 (18.7)	71.9 (22.2)	71.0 (21.7)	64.4 (18.0)	53.3 (11.8)	43.2 (6.2)	34.7 (1.5)	50.1 (10.1)
Mean minimum °F (°C)	11.1 (−11.6)	13.6 (−10.2)	21.0 (−6.1)	34.2 (1.2)	45.6 (7.6)	54.3 (12.4)	63.5 (17.5)	62.4 (16.9)	52.9 (11.6)	40.7 (4.8)	29.4 (−1.4)	19.4 (−7.0)	8.7 (−12.9)
Record low °F (°C)	−3 (−19)	−7 (−22)	7 (−14)	22 (−6)	36 (2)	46 (8)	56 (13)	51 (11)	42 (6)	30 (−1)	17 (−8)	−2 (−19)	−7 (−22)
Average precipitation inches (mm)	3.25 (83)	2.93 (74)	4.01 (102)	3.85 (98)	3.58 (91)	4.03 (102)	4.30 (109)	4.41 (112)	3.88 (99)	3.81 (97)	3.15 (80)	4.08 (104)	45.28 (1,150)
Average snowfall inches (cm)	8.6 (22)	9.8 (25)	5.4 (14)	0.4 (1.0)	0.0 (0.0)	0.0 (0.0)	0.0 (0.0)	0.0 (0.0)	0.0 (0.0)	0.1 (0.25)	0.3 (0.76)	5.2 (13)	29.8 (76)
Average precipitation days (≥ 0.01 in)	10.3	10.2	10.9	11.2	11.6	10.7	9.7	9.5	8.3	9.0	8.8	11.5	121.7
Average snowy days (≥ 0.1 in)	4.4	3.7	2.6	0.2	0.0	0.0	0.0	0.0	0.0	0.0	0.2	2.7	13.8
Source: NOAA

=== Parks ===
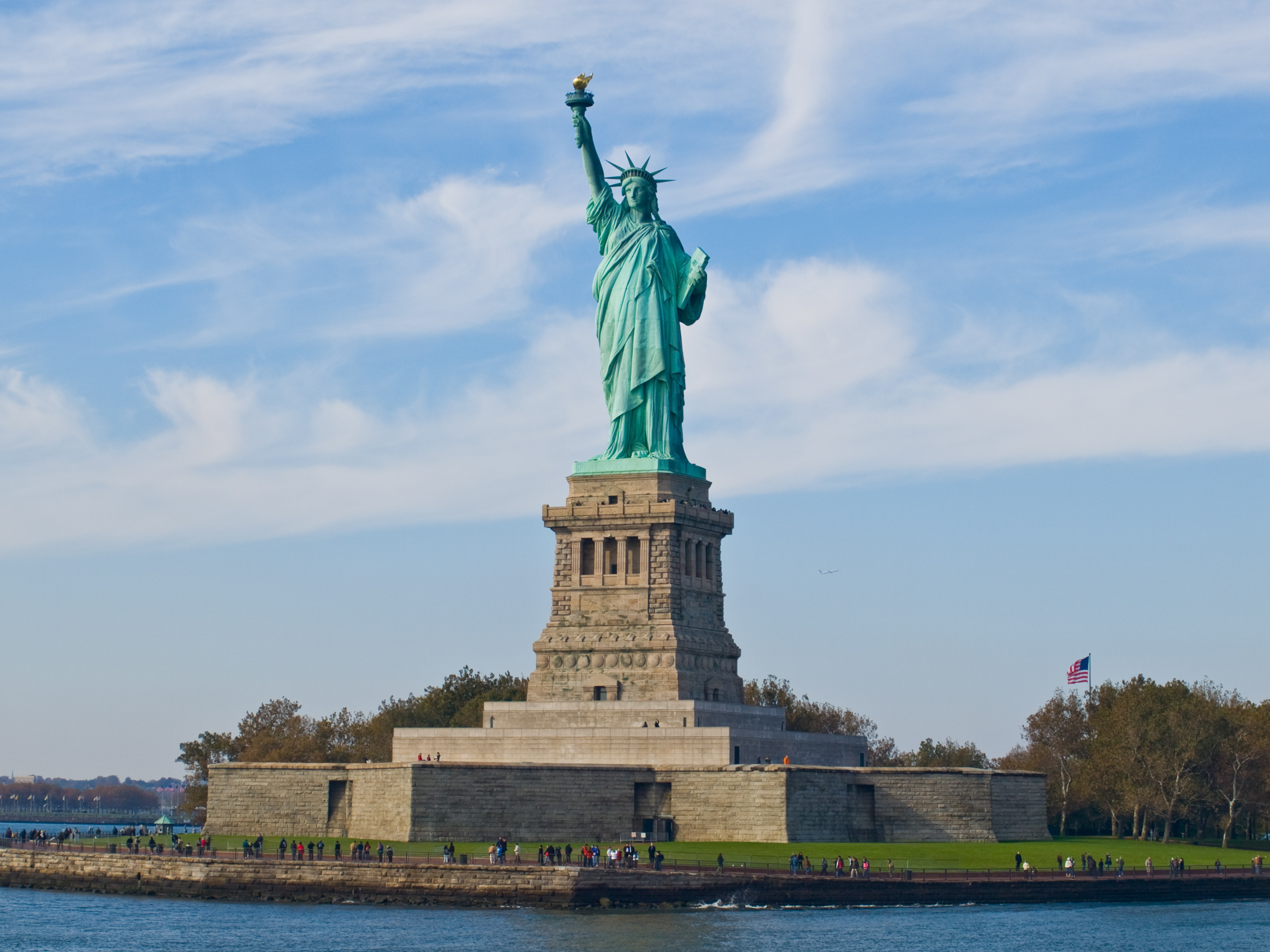
The Statue of Liberty on Liberty Island in New York Harbor, a global symbol of the United States and its ideals of liberty, freedom, and opportunity

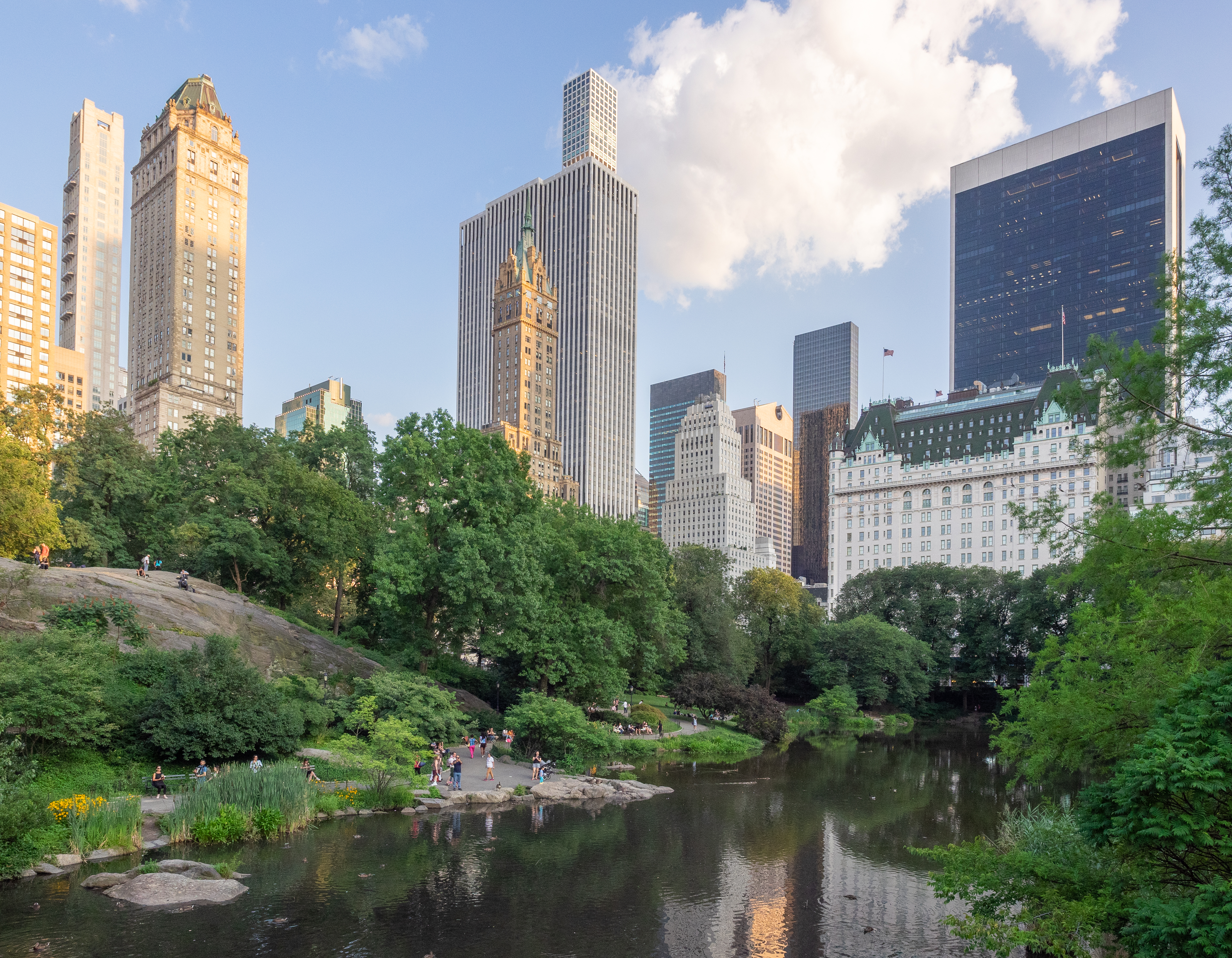
The Pond and Midtown Manhattan as seen from Gapstow Bridge in Central Park

The city of New York has a complex park system, with various lands operated by the National Park Service, the New York State Office of Parks, Recreation and Historic Preservation, and the New York City Department of Parks and Recreation. In its 2023 ParkScore ranking, the Trust for Public Land reported that the park system in New York City was the tenth-best park system among the most populous U.S. cities, citing the city's park acreage, investment in parks, and that 99% of residents are within 1/2 mile (0.80 km) of a park.

Gateway National Recreation Area contains over 26,000 acres (110 km^{2}), most of it in New York City. In Brooklyn and Queens, the park contains over 9,000 acres (36 km^{2}) of salt marsh, wetlands, islands, and water, including most of Jamaica Bay and the Jamaica Bay Wildlife Refuge. Also in Queens, the park includes a significant portion of the western Rockaway Peninsula, most notably Jacob Riis Park and Fort Tilden. In Staten Island, it includes Fort Wadsworth, with historic pre-Civil War era Battery Weed and Fort Tompkins, and Great Kills Park.

The Statue of Liberty National Monument and Ellis Island Immigration Museum are managed by the National Park Service and are in both New York and New Jersey. They are joined in the harbor by Governors Island National Monument. Historic sites under federal management on Manhattan Island include Stonewall National Monument; Castle Clinton National Monument; Federal Hall National Memorial; Theodore Roosevelt Birthplace National Historic Site; General Grant National Memorial (Grant's Tomb); African Burial Ground National Monument; and Hamilton Grange National Memorial. Hundreds of properties are listed on the National Register of Historic Places or as a National Historic Landmark.

There are seven state parks within New York City. They include: the Clay Pit Ponds State Park Preserve, a natural area that includes extensive riding trails; the Riverbank State Park, a 28-acre (11 ha) facility; and the Marsha P. Johnson State Park, a state park in Brooklyn and Manhattan that borders the East River renamed in honor of Marsha P. Johnson.

New York City has over 28,000 acres (110 km^{2}) of municipal parkland and 14 miles (23 km) of public beaches. The largest municipal park in the city is Pelham Bay Park in the Bronx, with 2,772 acres (1,122 ha), and the most visited urban park is the Central Park, and one of the most filmed and visited locations in the world, with 42 million visitors in 2023.

=== Environment ===
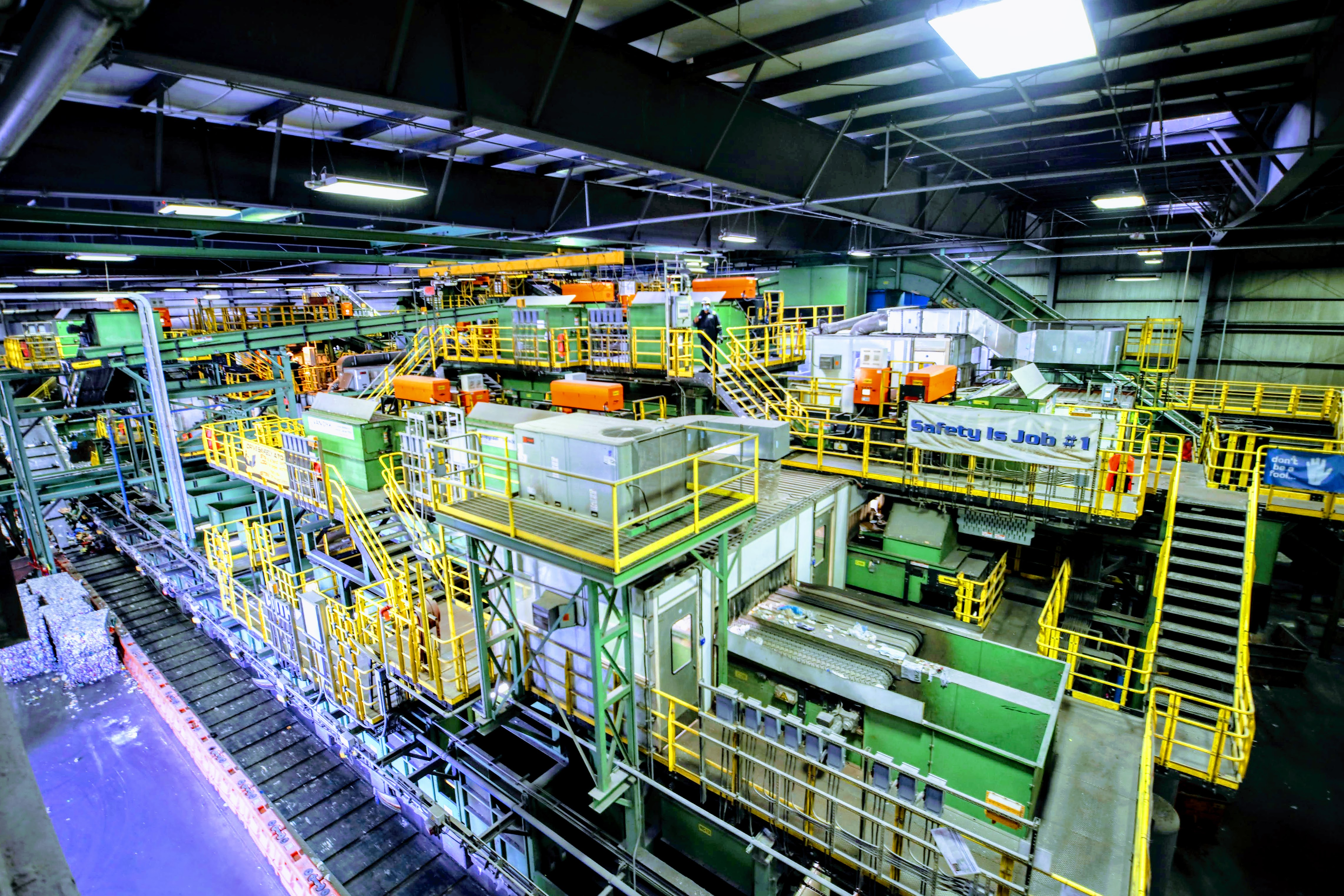
The Sunset Park Material Recovery Facility is the largest commingled recycling facility in the United States.

Environmental issues in New York City are affected by the city's size, density, abundant public transportation infrastructure, and its location at the mouth of the Hudson River. For example, it is one of the country's biggest sources of pollution and has the lowest per-capita greenhouse gas emissions rate and electricity usage. Governors Island is planned to host a US$1 billion research and education center to make New York City the global leader in addressing the climate crisis.

As an oceanic port city, New York City is vulnerable to long-term manifestations of global warming like sea level rise exacerbated by land subsidence. Climate change has spawned the development of a significant climate resiliency and environmental sustainability economy in the city. New York City has focused on reducing its environmental impact and carbon footprint. Mass transit use is the highest in the country.

New York's high rate of public transit use, more than 610,000 daily cycling trips as of 2022, and many pedestrian commuters make it the most energy-efficient major city in the United States. Walk and bicycle modes of travel account for 21% of all modes for trips in the city; nationally, the rate for metro regions is about 8%. In both 2011 and 2015, Walk Score named New York City the most walkable large city in the United States, and in 2018, Stacker ranked New York the most walkable American city. Citibank sponsored public bicycles for the city's bike-share project, which became known as Citi Bike, in 2013. New York City's numerical "in-season cycling indicator" of bicycling in the city had hit an all-time high of 437 when measured in 2014.

The New York City drinking water supply is extracted from the protected Catskill Mountains watershed. As a result of the watershed's integrity and undisturbed natural water filtration system, New York is one of only four major cities in the United States the majority of whose drinking water is pure enough not to require water treatment. The city's municipal water system is the nation's largest, moving more than 1 billion U.S. gallons (3.8 billion liters) of water daily from a watershed covering 1,900 square miles (4,900 km^{2})

According to the 2016 World Health Organization Global Urban Ambient Air Pollution Database, the annual average concentration in New York City's air of particulate matter measuring 2.5 micrometers or less (PM_{2.5}) was 7.0 micrograms per cubic meter, or 3.0 micrograms within the recommended limit of the WHO Air Quality Guidelines for the annual mean PM_{2.5}. The New York City Department of Health and Mental Hygiene, in partnership with Queens College, conducts the New York Community Air Survey to measure pollutants at about 150 locations.

== Demographics ==
Historical population
Year	Pop.	±%
1698	4,937	—
1712	5,840	+18.3%
1723	7,248	+24.1%
1737	10,664	+47.1%
1746	11,717	+9.9%
1756	13,046	+11.3%
1771	21,863	+67.6%
1790	33,131	+51.5%
1800	60,515	+82.7%
1810	96,373	+59.3%
1820	123,706	+28.4%
1830	202,589	+63.8%
1840	312,710	+54.4%
1850	515,547	+64.9%
1860	813,669	+57.8%
1870	942,292	+15.8%
1880	1,206,299	+28.0%
1890	1,515,301	+25.6%
1900	3,437,202	+126.8%
1910	4,766,883	+38.7%
1920	5,620,048	+17.9%
1930	6,930,446	+23.3%
1940	7,454,995	+7.6%
1950	7,891,957	+5.9%
1960	7,781,984	−1.4%
1970	7,894,862	+1.5%
1980	7,071,639	−10.4%
1990	7,322,564	+3.5%
2000	8,008,288	+9.4%
2010	8,175,133	+2.1%
2020	8,804,190	+7.7%
2025 est.	8,584,629	−2.5%
(Note: 1880 and 1890 figures include part of the Bronx. Beginning with 1900, figures are for the consolidated city of the five boroughs. Sources: 1698–1771, 1790–1990 2000 and 2010 2020 and 2025)

New York City is the most populous city in the United States, with 8,804,190 residents as of the 2020 census, its highest decennial count ever, incorporating more immigration into the city than outmigration since the 2010 census. More than twice as many people live in New York City as in Los Angeles, the second largest American city. The city's population in 2020 was 35.9% White, 22.7% Black, 14.6% Asian, 10.5% Mixed, 0.7% Native American and 0.1% Pacific Islander; 28.4% identified themselves as Hispanic or Latino.

Between 2010 and 2020, New York City's population grew by 629,000 residents, more than the total growth of the next four largest American cities (Los Angeles, Chicago, Houston, and Phoenix) combined. The city's population density of 27,744.1 inhabitants per square mile (10,712.1/km^{2}) makes it the densest of any American municipality with a population above 100,000. Manhattan's population density is 70,450.8 inhabitants per square mile (27,201.2/km^{2}), the highest of any county in the United States.

Based on data from the 2020 census, New York City comprised about 43.6% of the state's population of 20,202,320, and about 39% of the population of the New York metropolitan area. The majority of New York City residents in 2020 (5,141,539 or 58.4%) were living in Brooklyn or Queens, the two boroughs on Long Island. An estimated 800 languages are spoken in New York, and the New York City metropolitan statistical area has the largest foreign-born population of any metropolitan region in the world. The New York region continues to be by far the leading metropolitan gateway for legal immigrants admitted into the United States, substantially exceeding the combined totals of Los Angeles and Miami. Nearly seven times as many young professionals applied for jobs in New York City in 2023 as compared to 2019, making New York the most popular destination for recent college graduates.

The New York metropolitan area became the world's largest urban area in 1925, surpassing London. The metropolitan area surpassed 10 million in the early 1930s, becoming the first megacity. In 1955, it was surpassed by the Greater Tokyo Area.

=== Ethnicity and nationality ===
According to 2022 estimates from the American Community Survey, the largest self-reported ancestries in New York City were Dominican (8.7%), Chinese (7.5%), Puerto Rican (6.9%), Italian (5.5%), Mexican (4.4%), Irish (4.4%), Asian Indian (3.1%), German (2.9%), Jamaican (2.4%), Ecuadorian (2.3%), English (2.1%), Polish (1.9%), Russian (1.7%), Arab (1.4%), Haitian (1.4%), Guyanese (1.3%), Filipino (1.1%), and Korean (1.1%).

Historical demographics	2020	2010	1990	1970	1940
White (non-Hispanic)	30.9%	33.3%	43.4%	64.0%	92.1%
Hispanic or Latino	28.3%	28.6%	23.7%	15.2%	1.6%
Black or African American (non-Hispanic)	20.2%	22.8%	28.8%	21.1%	6.1%
Asian and Pacific Islander (non-Hispanic)	15.6%	12.6%	7.0%	1.2%	0.2%
Native American (non-Hispanic)	0.2%	0.2%	0.4%	0.1%	N/A
Two or more races (non-Hispanic)	3.4%	1.8%	N/A	N/A	N/A

Based on American Community Survey data from 2018 to 2022, approximately 36.3% of the city's population is foreign-born (compared to 13.7% nationwide), and 40% of all children are born to mothers who are immigrants. Throughout its history, New York has been a major port of entry for immigrants. No single country or region of origin dominates. Queens has the largest Asian-American and Andean populations in the United States, and is also the most ethnically and linguistically diverse urban area in the world. The wider New York City metropolitan region is home to the world's largest foreign-born population of any metropolitan region, enumerating 5.9 million as of 2023.

New York City ethnic enclaves

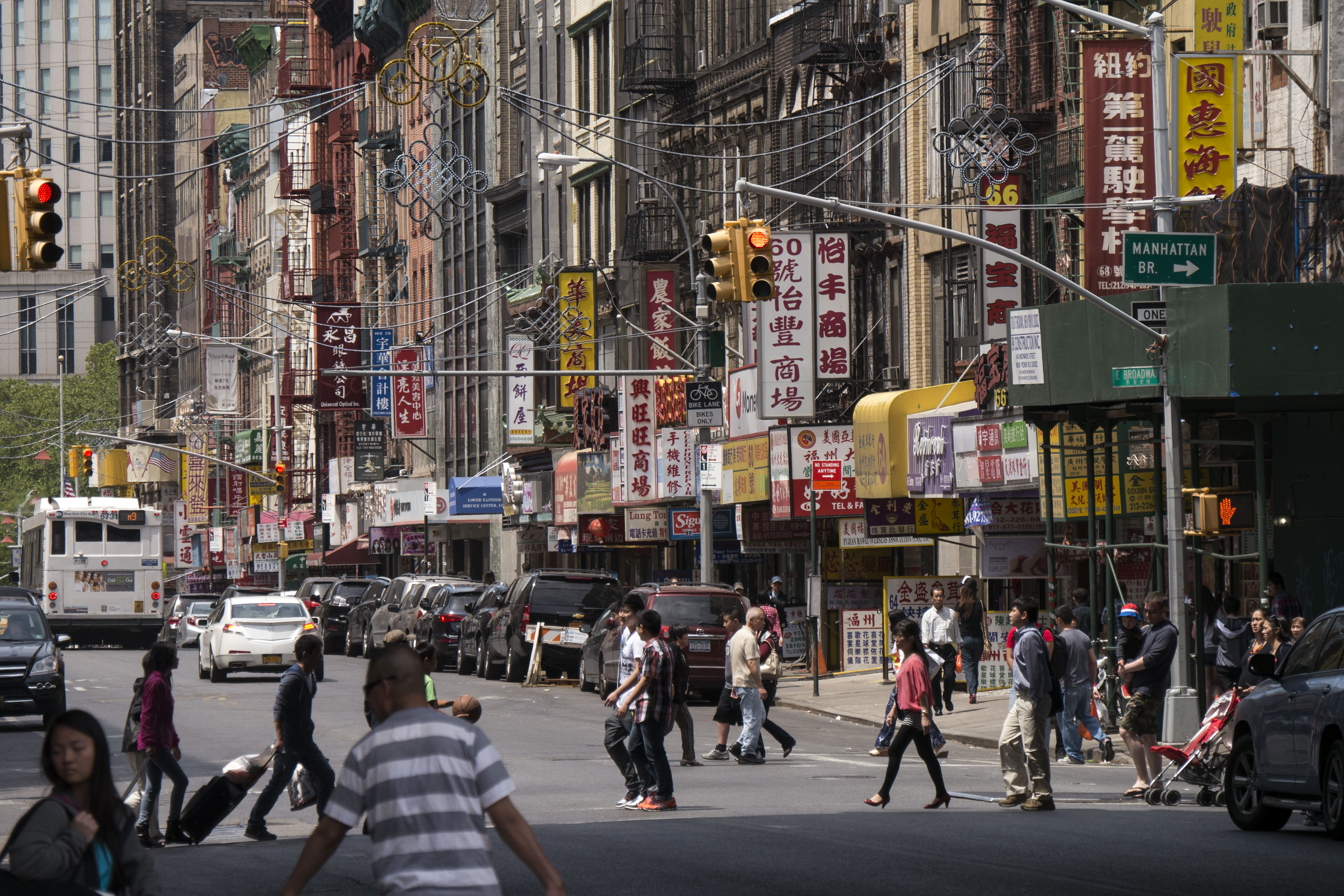
Little Fuzhou, Manhattan

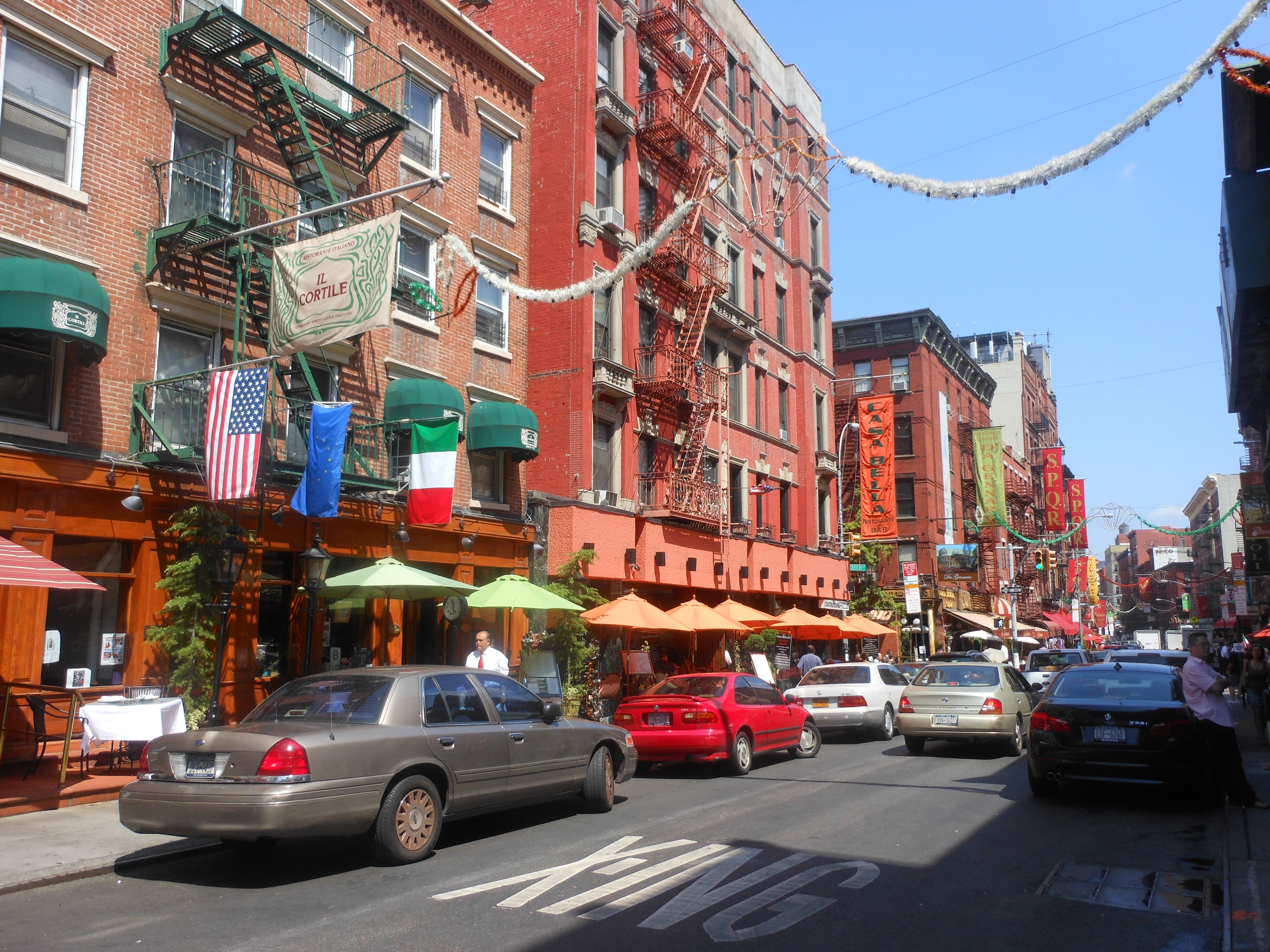
Little Italy, Manhattan

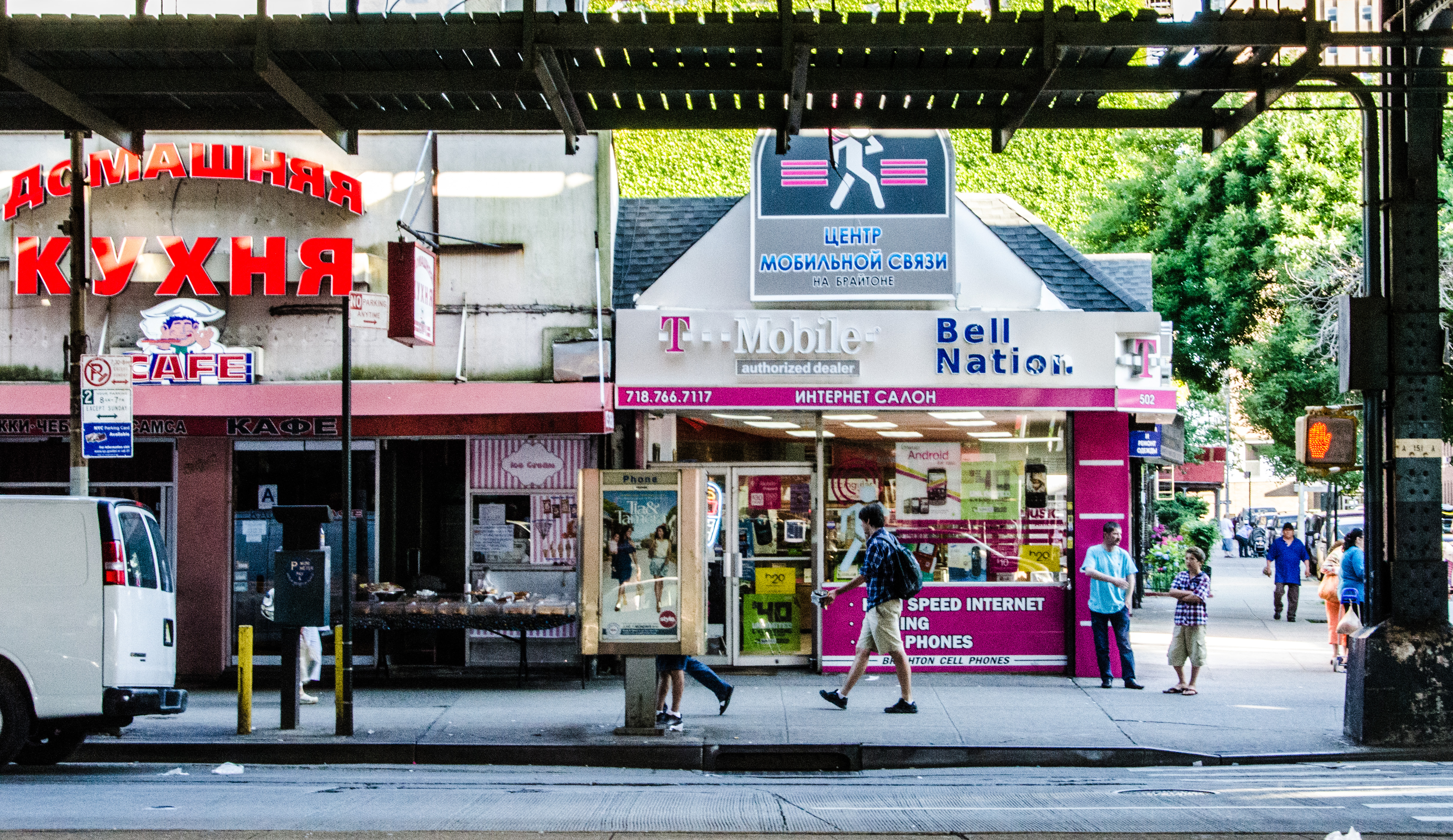
Little Russia, Brooklyn

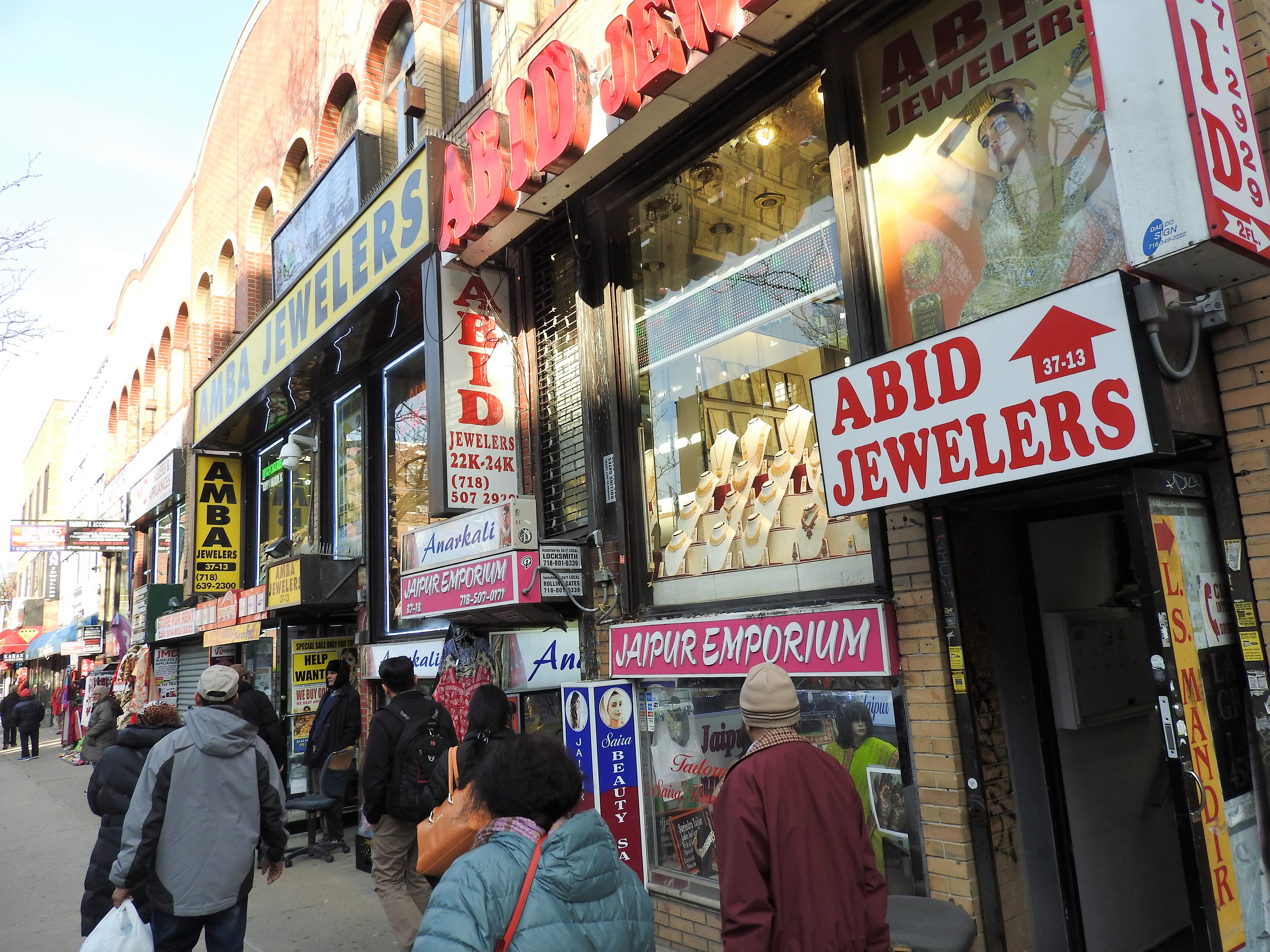
Little India, Queens

The New York metropolitan area has the largest Asian population, at 2.6 million. New York has the largest Chinese population outside of Asia and Asian Indian population in the Western Hemisphere, as well as the largest Russian-American, Italian-American, and African-American populations. New York is home to the largest Dominican-American, Puerto Rican–American, and South American and the second-largest overall Hispanic population in the United States, numbering over 5 million. Venezuela, Ecuador, Colombia, Guyana, Peru, and Brazil, are the top source countries from South America for immigrants to the New York City region; the Dominican Republic, Jamaica, Haiti, and Trinidad and Tobago in the Caribbean; Nigeria, Egypt, Ghana, Tanzania, Kenya, and South Africa from Africa; and El Salvador, Honduras, and Guatemala in Central America.

New York City contains the highest total Asian population of any U.S. city proper. Asian Americans in New York City, according to the 2010 census, number more than 1.2 million, greater than the combined totals of San Francisco and Los Angeles. Manhattan's Chinatown is the highest concentration of Chinese people in the Western Hemisphere, and Queens is home to the largest Tibetan population outside Asia. Arab Americans number over 160,000 in New York City, with the highest concentration in Brooklyn. New York City hosts the highest Palestinian population in the United States, and the highest diasporas of Uzbek and Albanian diasporas in the world; Turkish, Armenian, and Azerbaijani Americans are also rapidly growing segments of the city's non-Hispanic White population. The metropolitan area is home to 20% of the nation's Indian Americans and at least twenty Little India enclaves, and 15% of all Korean Americans and four Koreatowns. New York City and its metropolitan area have the largest population of Blacks or African Americans in the nation.

New York City has the largest European and non-Hispanic white population of any American city, numbering 2.7 million in 2012. The European diaspora residing in the city is very diverse and many European ethnic groups have formed enclaves. With 960,000 Jewish inhabitants as of 2023, New York City is home to the highest Jewish population of any city in the world, and its metropolitan area concentrated over 2 million Jews as of 2021, the second largest Jewish population worldwide after the Tel Aviv metropolitan area in Israel. In the borough of Brooklyn, an estimated one in four residents was Jewish as of 2018.

=== Sexual orientation and gender identity ===
New York City has been described as the gay capital of the world and the central node of the lesbian, gay, bisexual, and transgender (LGBT) sociopolitical ecosystem, and is home to one of the world's largest LGBT populations and the most prominent. The New York metropolitan area is home to about 570,000 self-identifying gay and bisexual people, the largest in the country. Same-sex sexual activity between consenting adults has been legal in New York since 1980's New York v. Onofre case, which invalidated the state's sodomy law. Same-sex marriage in New York was legalized on June 24, 2011, and the new law took effect on July 23, 2011.

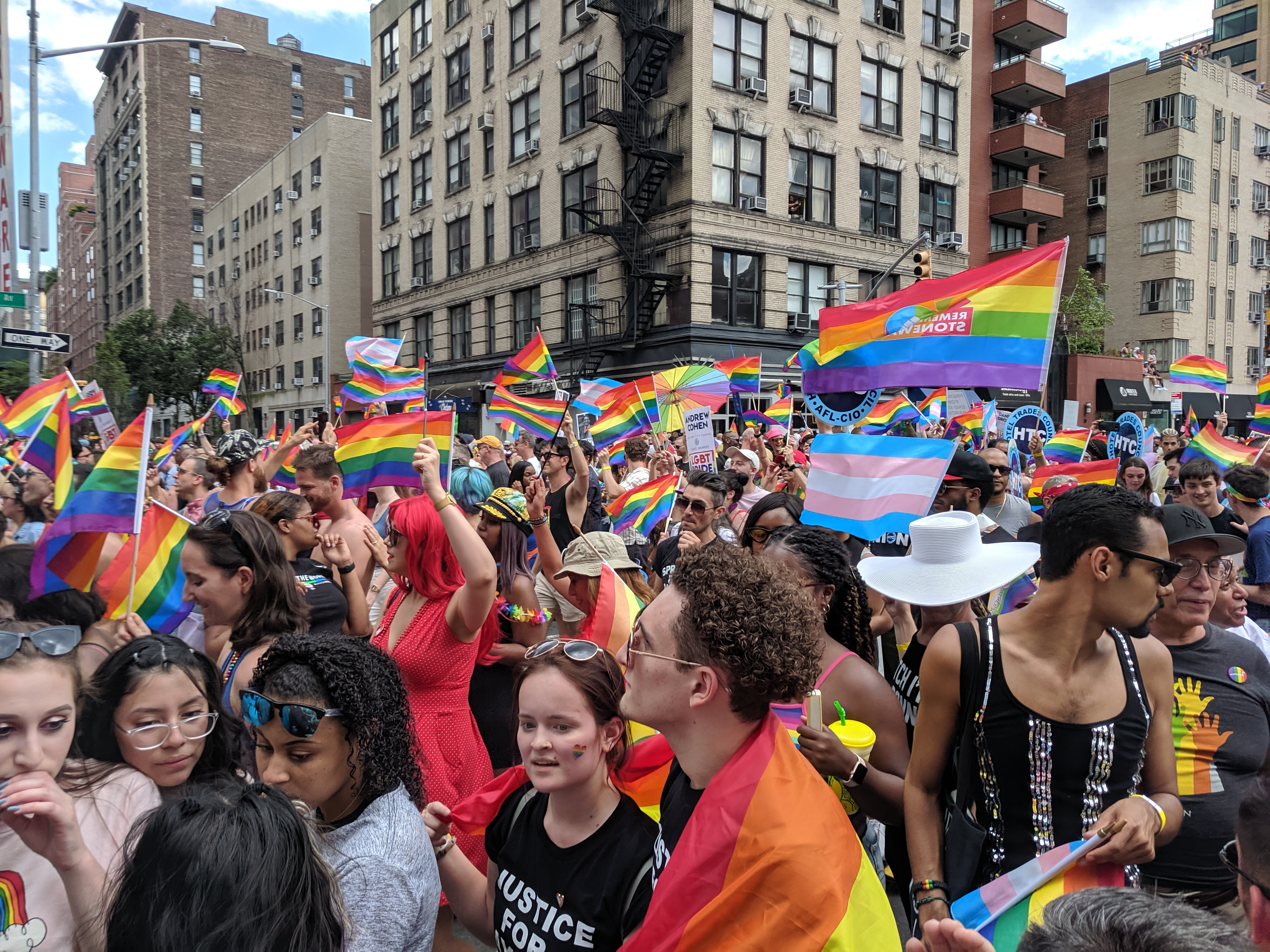
The NYC Pride March is the largest pride parade in the world.

The annual NYC Pride March proceeds southward down Fifth Avenue and ends at Greenwich Village in Lower Manhattan; the parade is the largest pride parade in the world, attracting tens of thousands of participants and millions of sidewalk spectators each June. The annual Queens Pride Parade is held in Jackson Heights and is accompanied by the ensuing Multicultural Parade.

Stonewall 50 – WorldPride NYC 2019 was the largest international Pride celebration in history, commemorating the 50th anniversary of the Stonewall uprising, with 150,000 participants and five million spectators attending in Manhattan alone. New York City is home to the largest transgender population in the world, estimated at more than 50,000 in 2018, concentrated in Manhattan, Brooklyn, and Queens; however, until the June 1969 Stonewall riots, this community had felt marginalized and neglected by the gay community. Brooklyn Liberation March, the largest transgender-rights demonstration in LGBT history, took place on June 14, 2020, stretching from Grand Army Plaza to Fort Greene, Brooklyn, focused on supporting Black transgender lives, drawing an estimated 15,000 to 20,000 participants.

=== Religion ===
Notable religious buildings in New York City
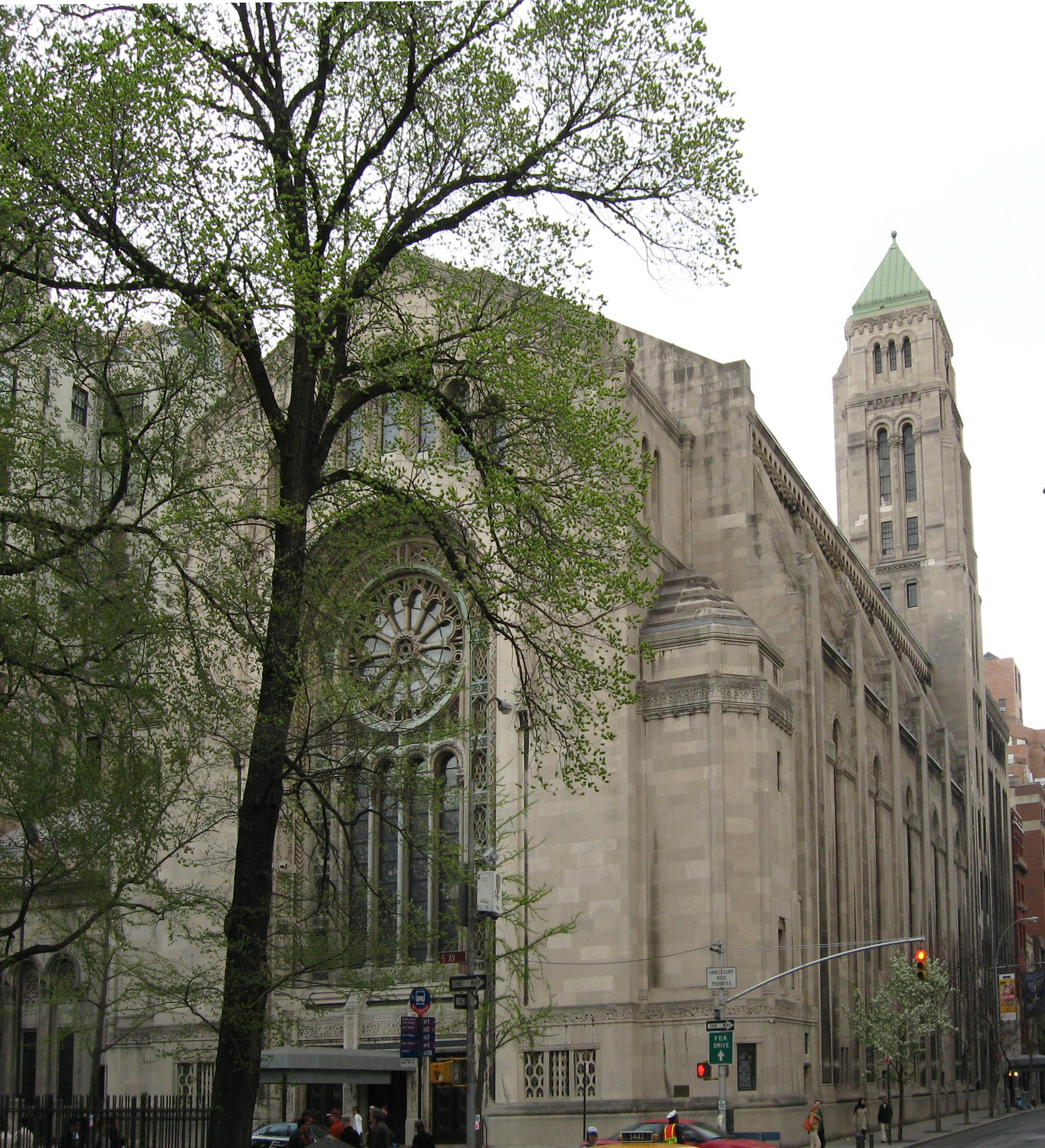
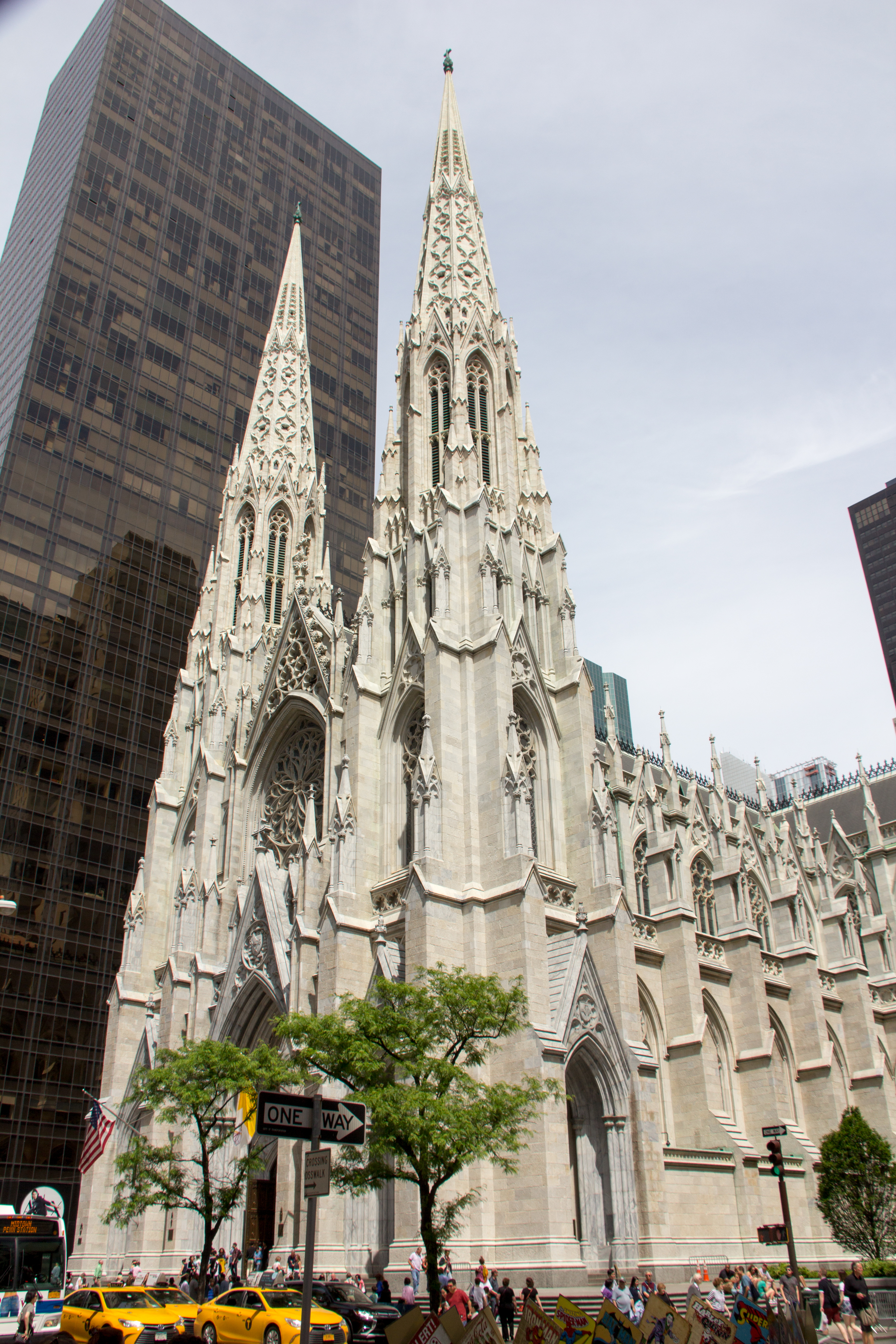
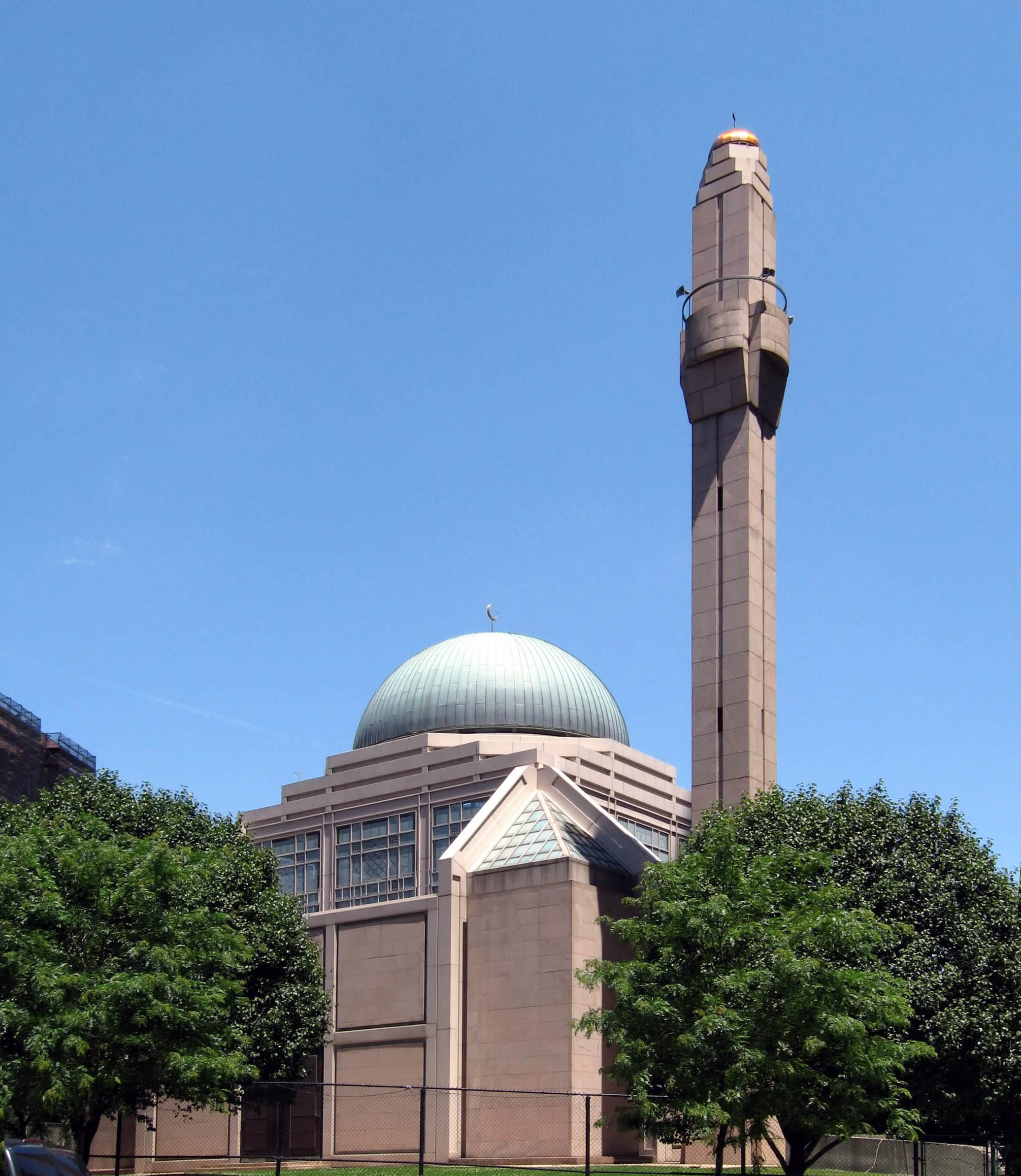
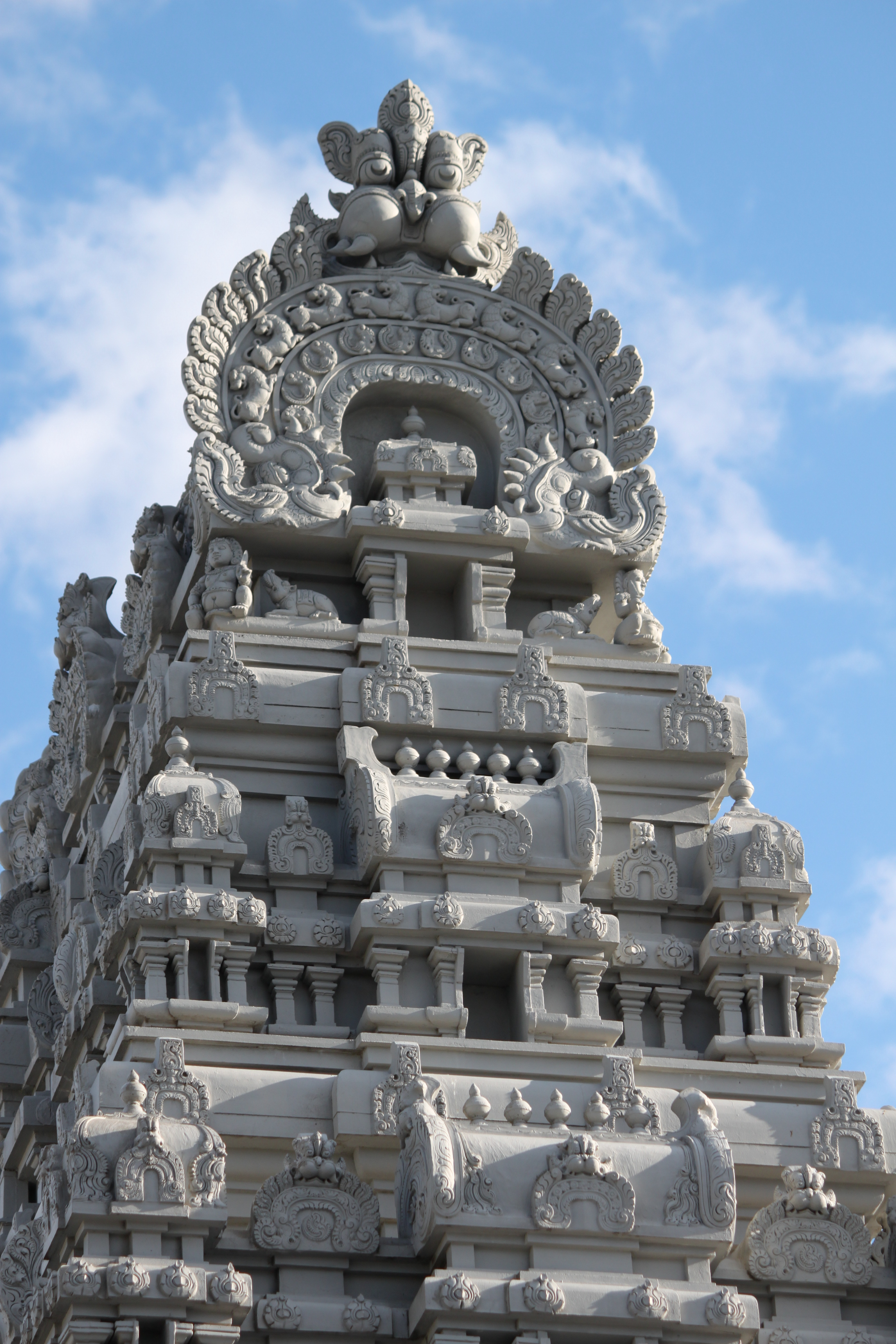
Left to right from the top: The Temple Emanu-El; St. Patrick's Cathedral; Islamic Cultural Center of New York; and Hindu Temple Society of North America

Christianity is the largest religion (59% adherent) in New York City, which is home to the highest number of churches of any city in the world. Catholicism is the largest Christian denomination (33%), followed by Protestantism (23%), and other Christian denominations (3%). The Latin Catholic population is primarily served by the Roman Catholic Archdiocese of New York and Diocese of Brooklyn, while Eastern Catholics are divided into numerous jurisdictions throughout the city. Evangelical Protestantism is the largest branch of Protestantism in the city (9%), followed by Mainline Protestantism (8%), while the converse is usually true for other U.S. cities and metropolitan areas.

With 960,000 Jewish inhabitants as of 2023, Judaism is the second-largest religion practiced in New York City, which is home to the largest Jewish population outside of Tel Aviv. Nearly half of the city's Jewish population lives in Brooklyn.

Islam ranks as the third-largest religion in New York City, following Christianity and Judaism, with estimates ranging between 600,000 and 1,000,000 observers of Islam, including 10% of the city's public school children. 22.3% of American Muslims live in New York City, with 1.5 million Muslims in the greater New York metropolitan area, the largest metropolitan Muslim population in the Western Hemisphere—and the most ethnically diverse Muslim population of any city in the world. Powers Street Mosque in Brooklyn is one of the oldest continuously operating mosques in the United States, and represents the first Islamic organization in both the city and the state.

Following these three largest religious groups in New York City are Hinduism, Buddhism, Sikhism, Zoroastrianism, and others. As of 2023, 24% of Greater New Yorkers identified with no organized religious affiliation, and 4% were self-identified atheists.

== Economy ==
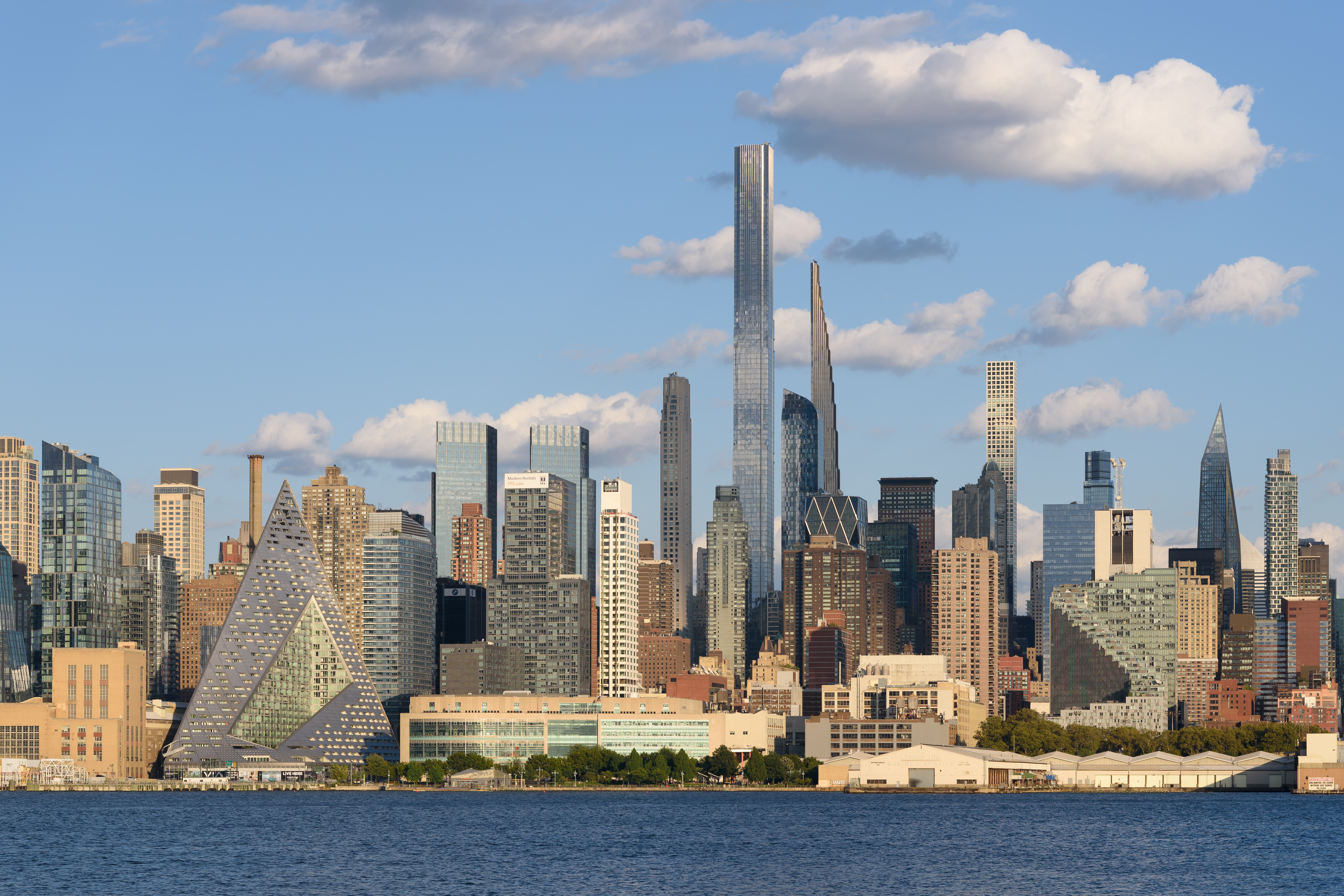
Midtown Manhattan is the world's largest central business district.

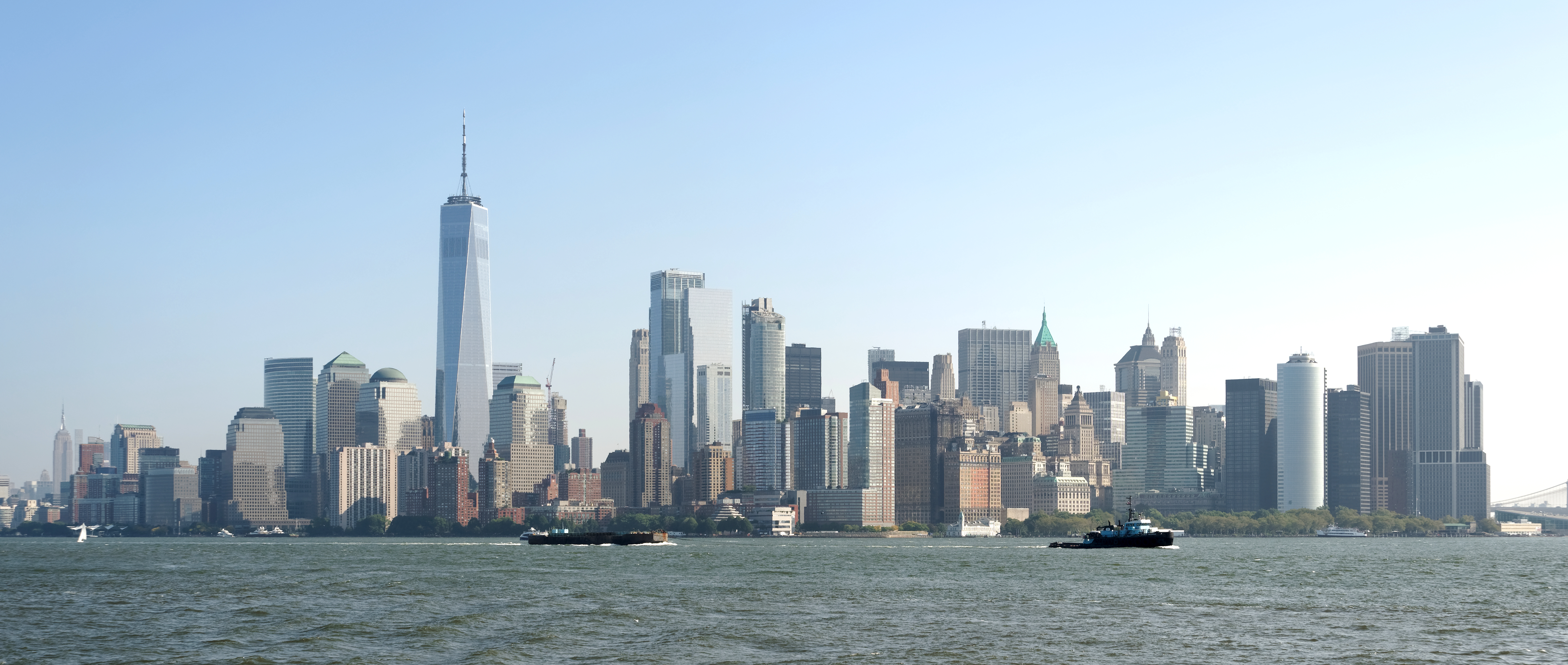
Lower Manhattan, including Wall Street, the world's principal financial center, and One World Trade Center, the tallest skyscraper in the Western Hemisphere

New York City is a global hub of business and commerce, sometimes called the "Capital of the World". Greater New York is the world's largest metropolitan economy, with a gross metropolitan product estimated at US$2.16 trillion in 2022. New York is a center for worldwide banking and finance, technology (including AI and medical technology) health care and life sciences research, retailing, world trade, transportation, tourism, real estate, new media, traditional media, advertising, legal services, accountancy, insurance, and the arts in the United States; while Silicon Alley, metonymous for New York's high technology sphere, continues to expand. The Port of New York and New Jersey is a major economic engine, benefitting post-Panamax from the expansion of the Panama Canal.

Many Fortune 500 corporations are headquartered in New York City, as are a large number of multinational corporations. New York City has been ranked first among cities across the globe in attracting capital, business, and tourists. New York City's role as the top global center for the advertising industry is metonymously reflected as Madison Avenue. The city's fashion industry provides approximately 180,000 employees with $11 billion in annual wages.

Significant other economic sectors include universities and non-profit institutions. Manufacturing declined over the 20th century but still accounts for significant employment. The city's apparel and garment industry, historically centered on the Garment District in Manhattan, peaked in 1950, when more than 323,000 workers were employed in the industry in New York. In 2015, fewer than 23,000 New York City residents were employed in the industry, although revival efforts were underway, and the American fashion industry continues to be metonymized as Seventh Avenue.

In 2024, the gross domestic product of New York City exceeded US$1.3 trillion, of which over $1 trillion (77%) was produced by Manhattan alone. Like other large cities, New York City has a degree of income disparity, as indicated by its Gini coefficient of 0.55 as of 2022. In November 2023, the city had total employment of over 4.75 million of which more than a quarter were in education and health services. Manhattan, which accounted for more than half of the city's jobs, had an average weekly wage of $2,590 in the second quarter of 2023, ranking fourth-highest among the nation's 360 largest counties. New York City is one of the relatively few American cities levying an income tax (about 3%) on its residents; despite this tax levy, New York City in 2024 was home by a significant margin to the highest number of billionaires of any city in the world, with a total of 110.

=== Wall Street ===
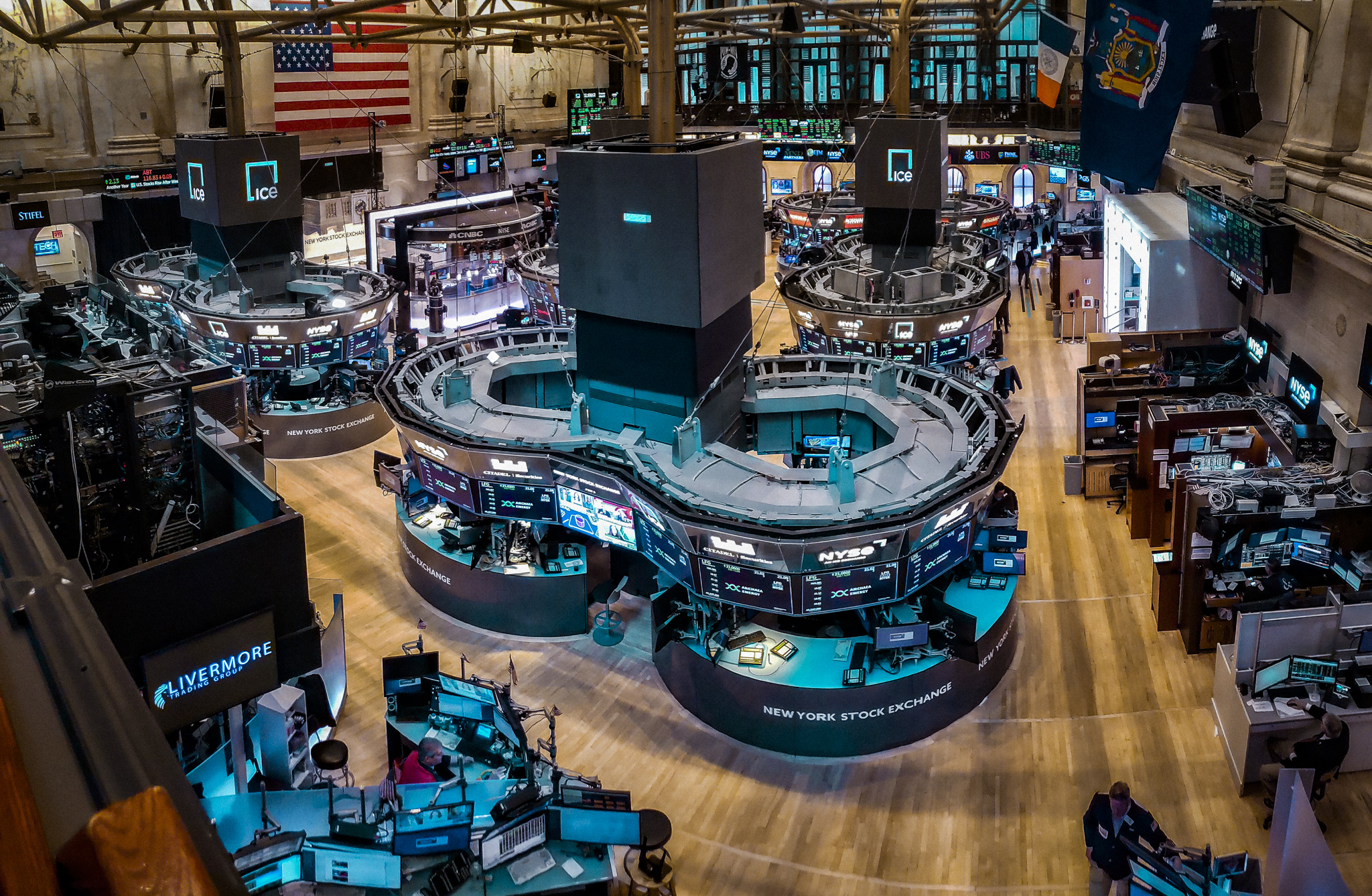
The New York Stock Exchange is the world's largest stock exchange per total market capitalization of its listed companies.

New York City's most important economic sector lies in its role as a comprehensive financial center, metonymously known as Wall Street. Lower Manhattan is home to the New York Stock Exchange and the Nasdaq, representing the world's largest and second largest stock exchanges, respectively, when measured both by overall average daily trading volume and by total market capitalization of their listed companies in 2013. In fiscal year 2013–14, Wall Street's securities industry generated 19% of New York State's tax revenue.

New York City remains the largest global center for trading in public equity and debt capital markets. New York also leads in hedge fund management; private equity; and the monetary volume of mergers and acquisitions. Several investment banks and investment managers headquartered in Manhattan are important participants in other global financial centers. New York is the principal commercial banking center of the United States.

Manhattan contained over 500 million square feet (46.5 million m^{2}) of office space in 2018, making New York City the largest office market in the world, while Midtown Manhattan, with 400 million square feet (37.2 million m^{2}) in 2018, is the largest central business district in the world.

=== Tech and biotech ===
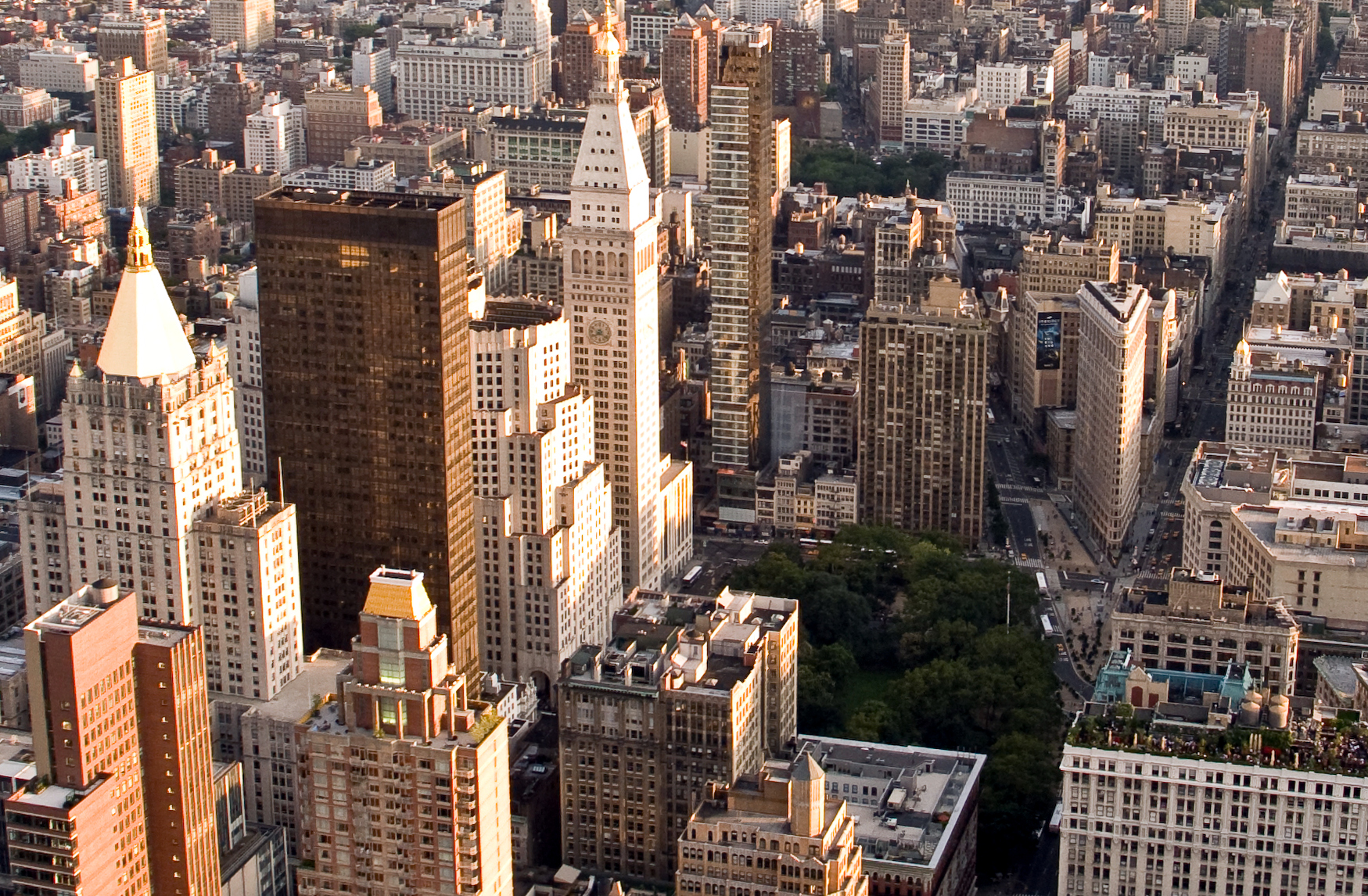
The Flatiron District is the cradle of Silicon Alley, initially metonymous for the New York metropolitan region's high tech sector.

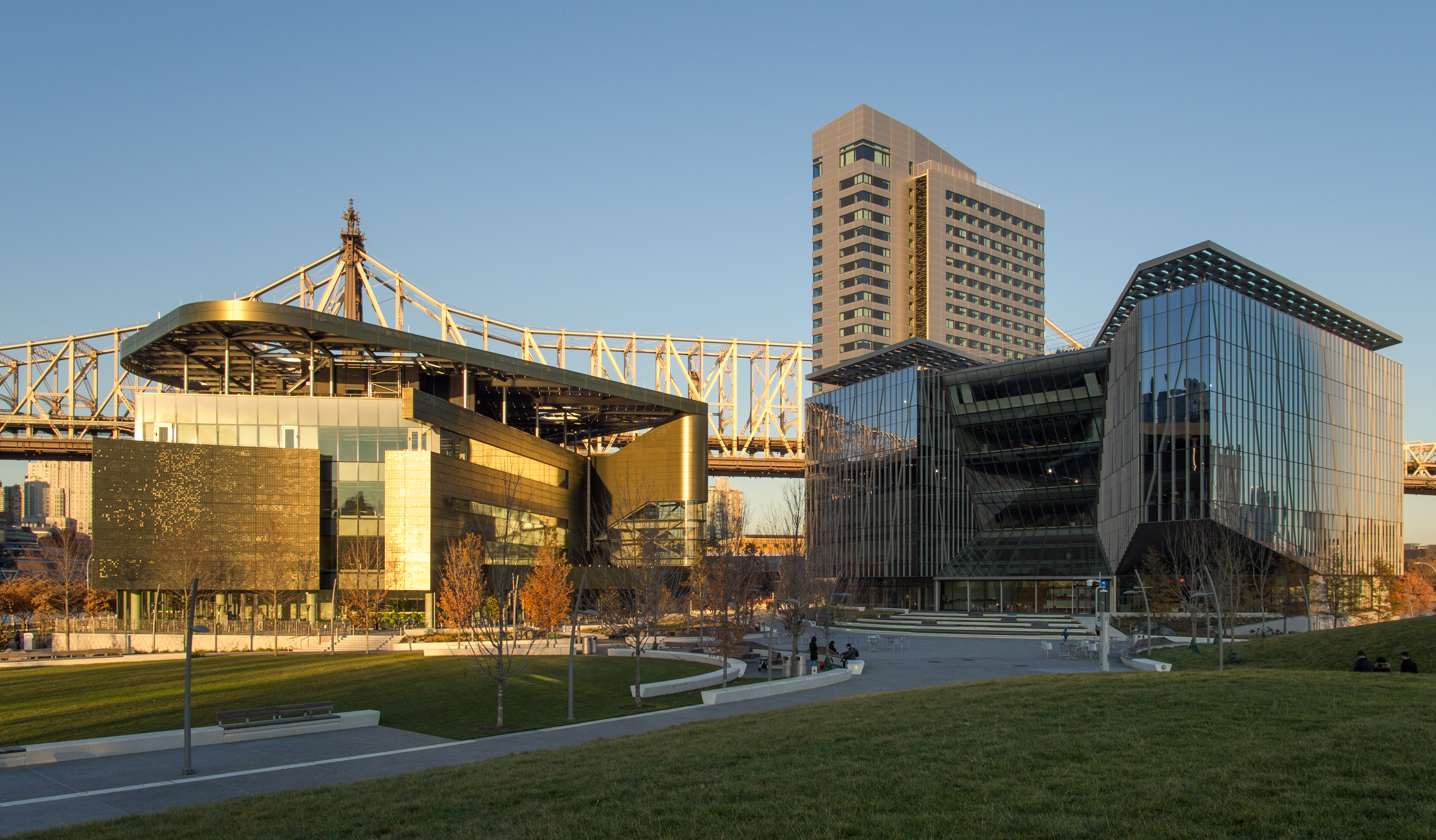
Cornell Tech on Roosevelt Island

New York is a top-tier global technology hub. As of 2025, the New York metropolitan area has become the largest tech talent hub in the world. Silicon Alley, once a metonym for the sphere encompassing the metropolitan region's high technology industries, is no longer a relevant moniker as the city's tech environment has expanded dramatically both in location and in scope since at least 2003, when tech business appeared in more places in Manhattan and other boroughs, and not much silicon was involved. New York City's current tech sphere encompasses the array of applications involving universal applications of artificial intelligence (AI), broadband internet, new media, financial technology (fintech) and cryptocurrency, biotechnology, game design, and other fields within information technology that are supported by its entrepreneurship ecosystem and venture capital investments. Technology-driven startup companies and entrepreneurial employment are growing in New York City and the region. The technology sector has been claiming a greater share of New York City's economy since 2010. Tech:NYC, founded in 2016, is a non-profit organization which represents New York City's technology industry with government, civic institutions, in business, and in the media, and whose primary goals are to further augment New York's substantial tech talent base and to advocate for policies that will nurture tech companies to grow in the city.

New York City's AI sector raised US$483.6 million in venture capital investment in 2022. In 2023, New York unveiled the first comprehensive initiative to create both a framework of rules and a chatbot to regulate the use of AI within the sphere of city government.

The biotechnology sector is growing in New York City, based on the city's strength in academic scientific research and public and commercial financial support. On December 19, 2011, Mayor Michael R. Bloomberg announced his choice of Cornell University and Technion-Israel Institute of Technology to build a $2 billion graduate school of applied sciences called Cornell Tech on Roosevelt Island intending to transform New York City into the world's premier technology capital.

=== Real estate ===
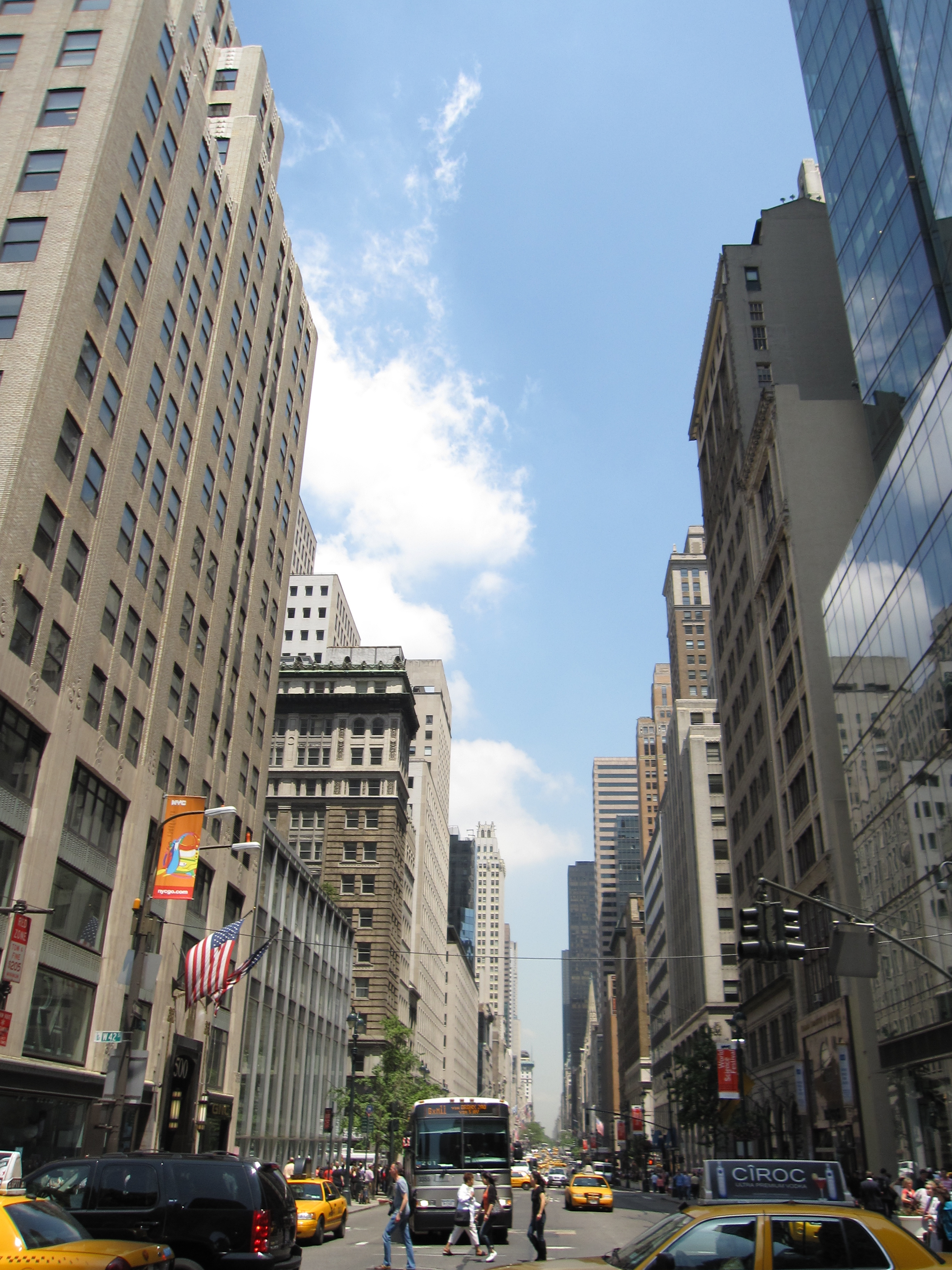
Fifth Avenue in Midtown Manhattan is the most expensive shopping street in the world.

New York City real estate is a haven for global investors. The total value of all New York City property was assessed at US$1.479 trillion for the 2017 fiscal year, an increase of 6.1% from the previous year. Of the total market value, single family homes accounted for $765 billion (51.7%); condominiums, co-ops, and apartment buildings totaled $351 billion (23.7%); and commercial properties were valued at $317 billion (21.4%). Fifth Avenue in Midtown Manhattan commands the highest retail rents in the world, at $2,000 per square foot ($22,000/m^{2}) in 2023.

New York City has one of the highest costs of living in the world, which is exacerbated by the city's housing shortage. In 2023, one-bedroom apartments in Manhattan rented at a median monthly price of US$4,443. The median house price city-wide is over $1 million as of 2023. With 33,000 units available in 2023 among the city's 2.3 million rentable apartments, the vacancy rate was 1.4%, the lowest level since 1968 and a rate that is indicative of a shortage of available units, especially among those with rents below a monthly rental of $1,650, where less than 1% of units were available. Perennially high demand has pushed median monthly one-bedroom apartment rents in New York City to over US$4,000 and two-bedroom rents to over $5,000, the highest in the United States by a significant margin.

=== Tourism ===
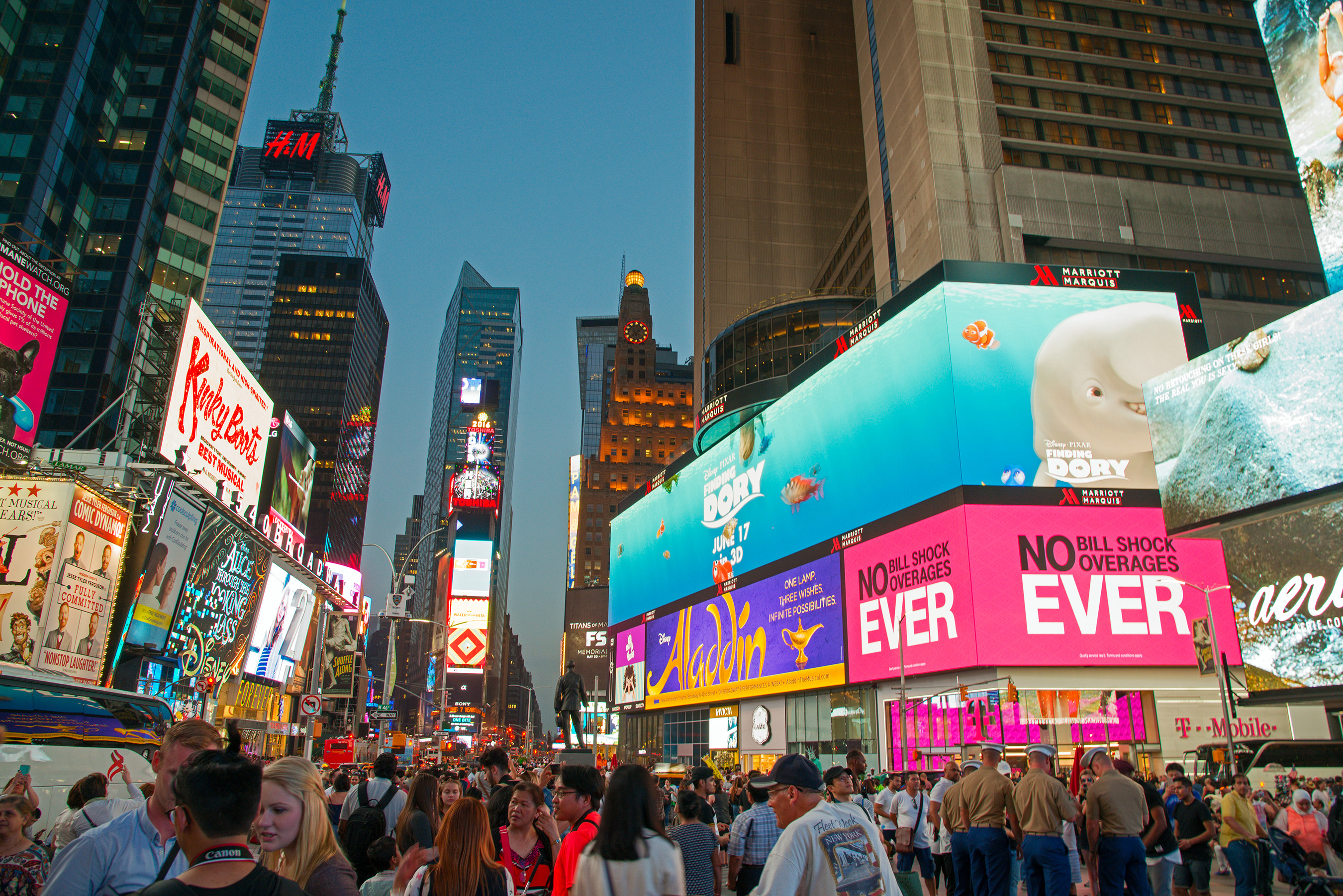
Times Square is one of the world's leading tourist attractions with 50 million tourists annually.

Tourism is a vital industry for New York City, and New York City Tourism + Conventions represents the city's official bureau of tourism. New York has witnessed a growing combined volume of international and domestic tourists, with as many as 66.6 million visitors to the city per year, including as many as 13.5 million international visitors, with the highest numbers from the United Kingdom, Canada, Brazil, and China. Multiple sources have called New York the most photographed city in the world. I Love New York (stylized I ❤ NY) is both a logo and a song that are the basis of an advertising campaign and have been used since 1977 to promote tourism in New York City, and later to promote New York State as well. The trademarked logo is owned by New York State Empire State Development.

Many districts and monuments in New York City are major landmarks, including three of the world's ten most-visited tourist attractions in 2023. A record 66.6 million tourists visited New York City in 2019, bringing in $47.4 billion in tourism revenue. Visitor numbers dropped by two-thirds in 2020 during the pandemic, rebounding to 63.3 million in 2023. Major landmarks in New York City include the Metropolitan Museum of Art, the Statue of Liberty, the Empire State Building, and Central Park. Times Square is the brightly illuminated hub of the Broadway Theater District, and a major center of the world's entertainment industry, attracting 50 million visitors annually to one of the world's busiest pedestrian intersections. According to The Broadway League, shows on Broadway sold approximately US$1.54 billion worth of tickets in both the 2022–2023 and the 2023–2024 seasons. Both seasons featured theater attendance of approximately 12.3 million each.

=== Media and entertainment ===
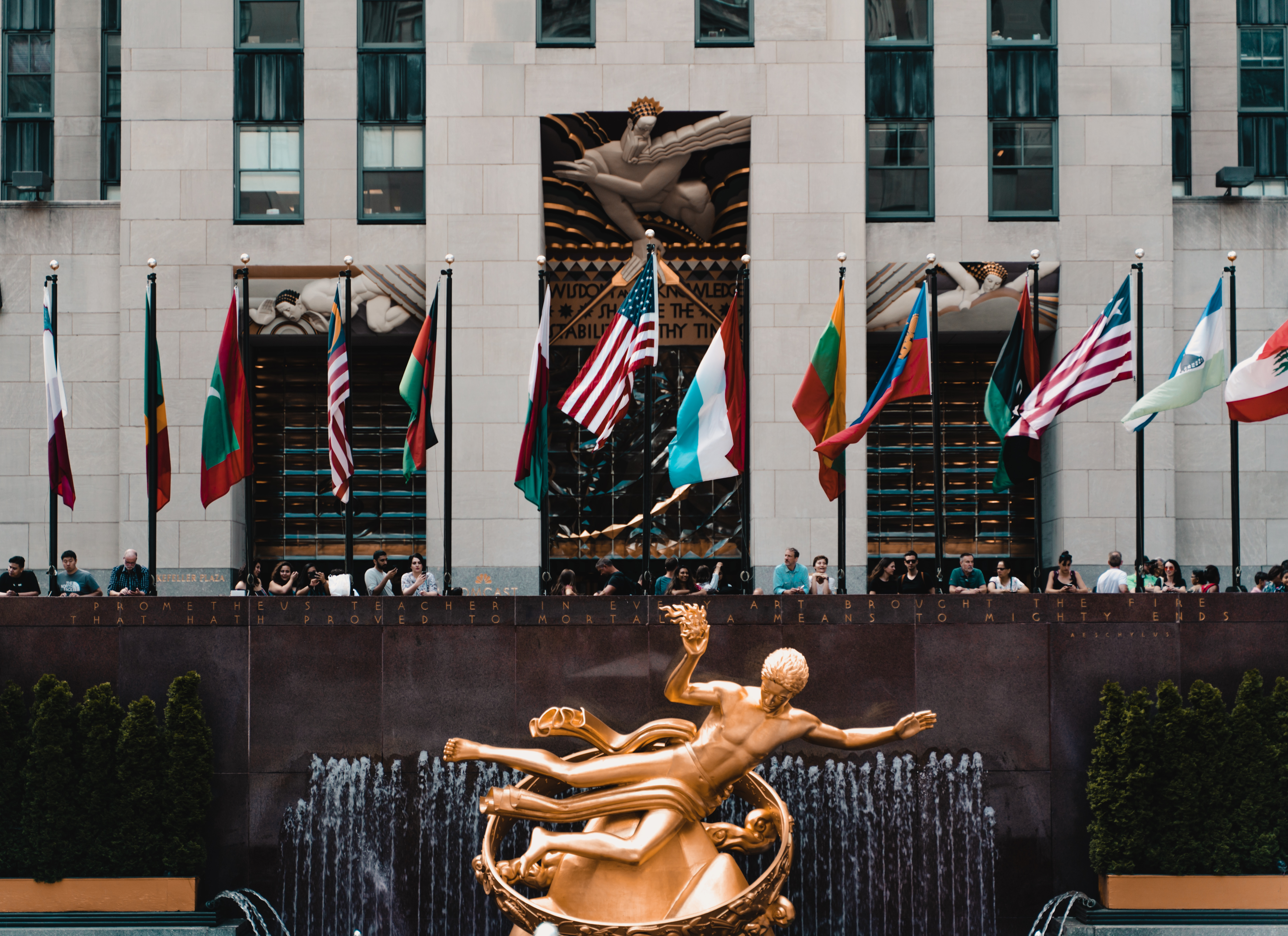
Rockefeller Center, one of Manhattan's leading media and entertainment hubs

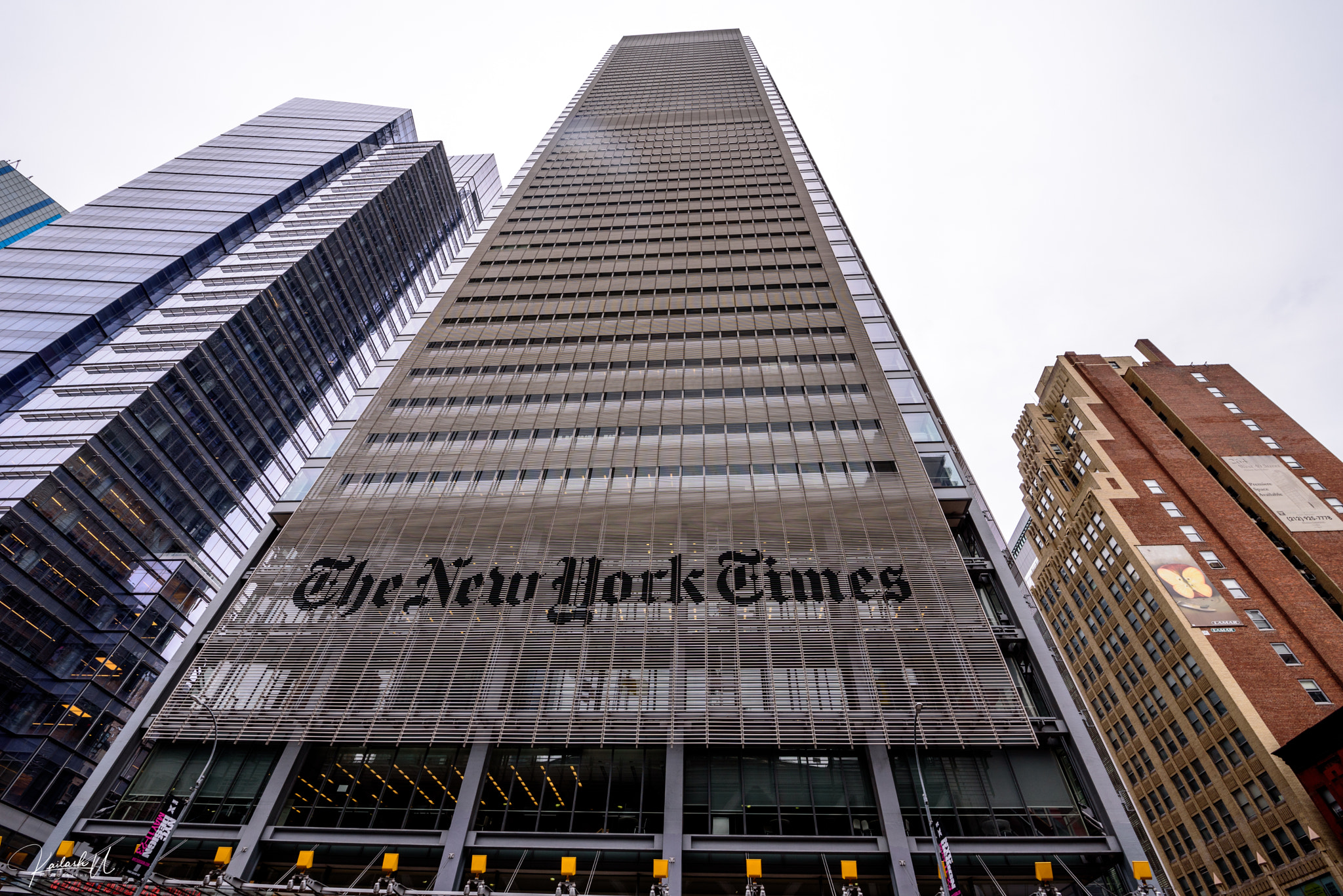
The headquarters of the New York Times Company, publisher of The New York Times

New York City has been described as the entertainment and digital media capital of the world. It is a center for the advertising, music, newspaper, digital media, and publishing industries, and is the largest media market in North America. Many of the world's largest media conglomerates are based in the city, including Warner Bros. Discovery, the Thomson Reuters Corporation, the Associated Press, Bloomberg L.P., the News Corp, The New York Times Company, NBCUniversal, the Hearst Corporation, AOL and Fox Corporation. Seven of the world's top eight global advertising agency networks have their headquarters in New York.

More than 200 newspapers and 350 consumer magazines have an office in the city, and the publishing industry employs about 11,500 people, with an economic impact of $9.2 billion. The two national daily newspapers with the largest daily circulations in the United States are published in New York: The Wall Street Journal and The New York Times broadsheets. With 132 awards through 2022, The Times has won the most Pulitzer Prizes for journalism and is considered the U.S. media's newspaper of record. Tabloid newspapers in the city include the New York Daily News, which was founded in 1919 by Joseph Medill Patterson, and the New York Post, founded in 1801 by Alexander Hamilton.

As of 2019, New York City was the second-largest center for filmmaking and television production in the United States, producing about 200 feature films annually. The industry employed more than 100,000 people in 2019, generating $12.2 billion in wages and a total economic impact of $64.1 billion. By volume, New York is the world leader in independent film production—one-third of all American independent films are produced there.

New York is a major center for non-commercial educational media. NYC Media is the official public radio, television, and online media network and broadcasting service of New York City, and has produced several original Emmy Award-winning shows covering music and culture in city neighborhoods and city government. The oldest public-access television channel in the United States is the Manhattan Neighborhood Network, founded in 1971. WNET is the city's major public television station and produces a third of national Public Broadcasting Service (PBS) television programming. WNYC, a public radio station owned by the city until 1997, has the largest public radio audience in the United States.

== Education ==
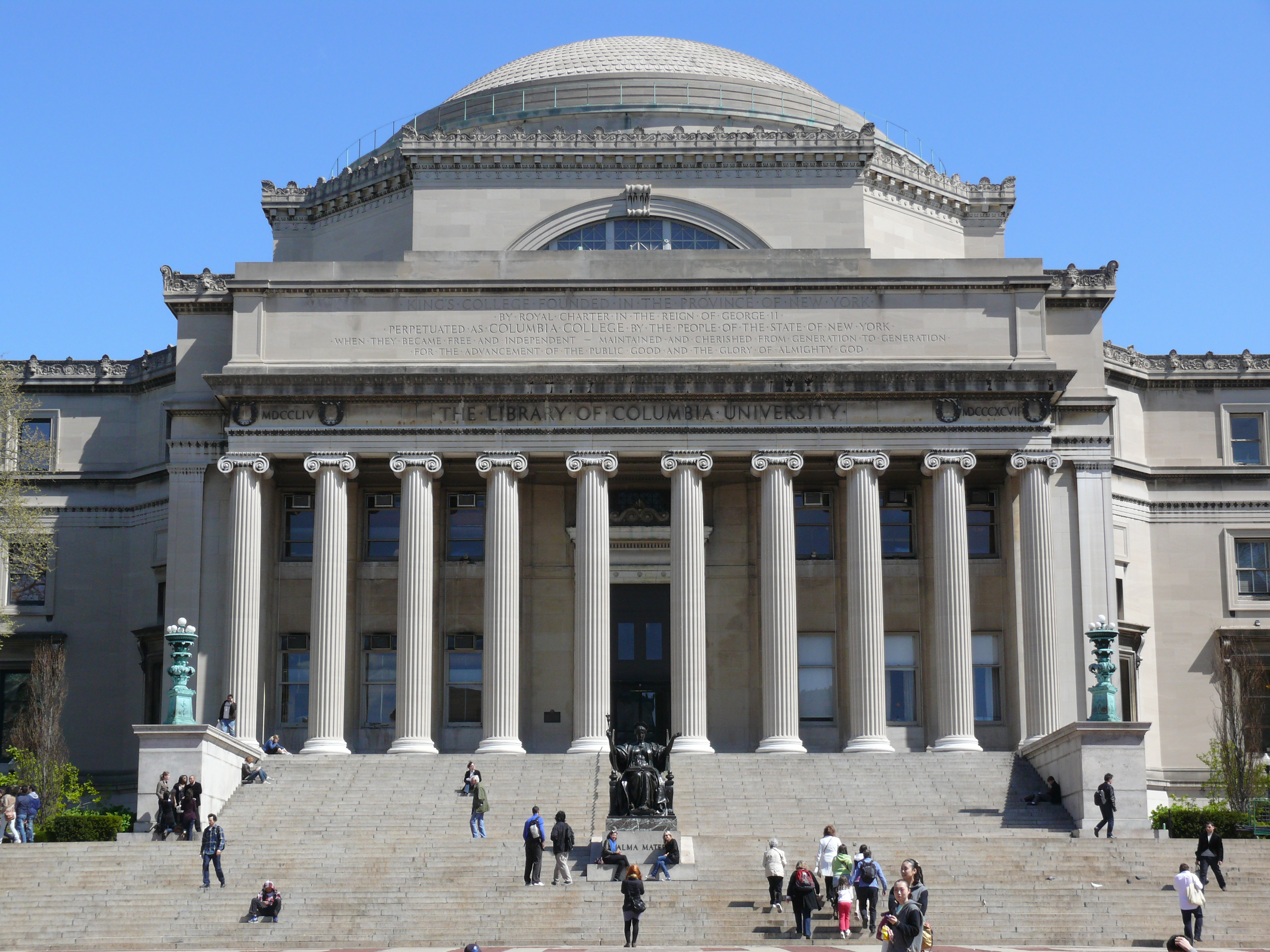
The Low Memorial Library at Columbia University

New York City has the largest educational system of any city. The city's educational infrastructure spans primary education, secondary education, higher education, and research. The New York City Public Schools system, managed by the New York City Department of Education, is the largest public school system in the United States, serving about 1.1 million students in approximately 1,800 separate primary and secondary schools, including charter schools, as of 2017–2018. There are approximately 900 additional privately run secular and religious schools.

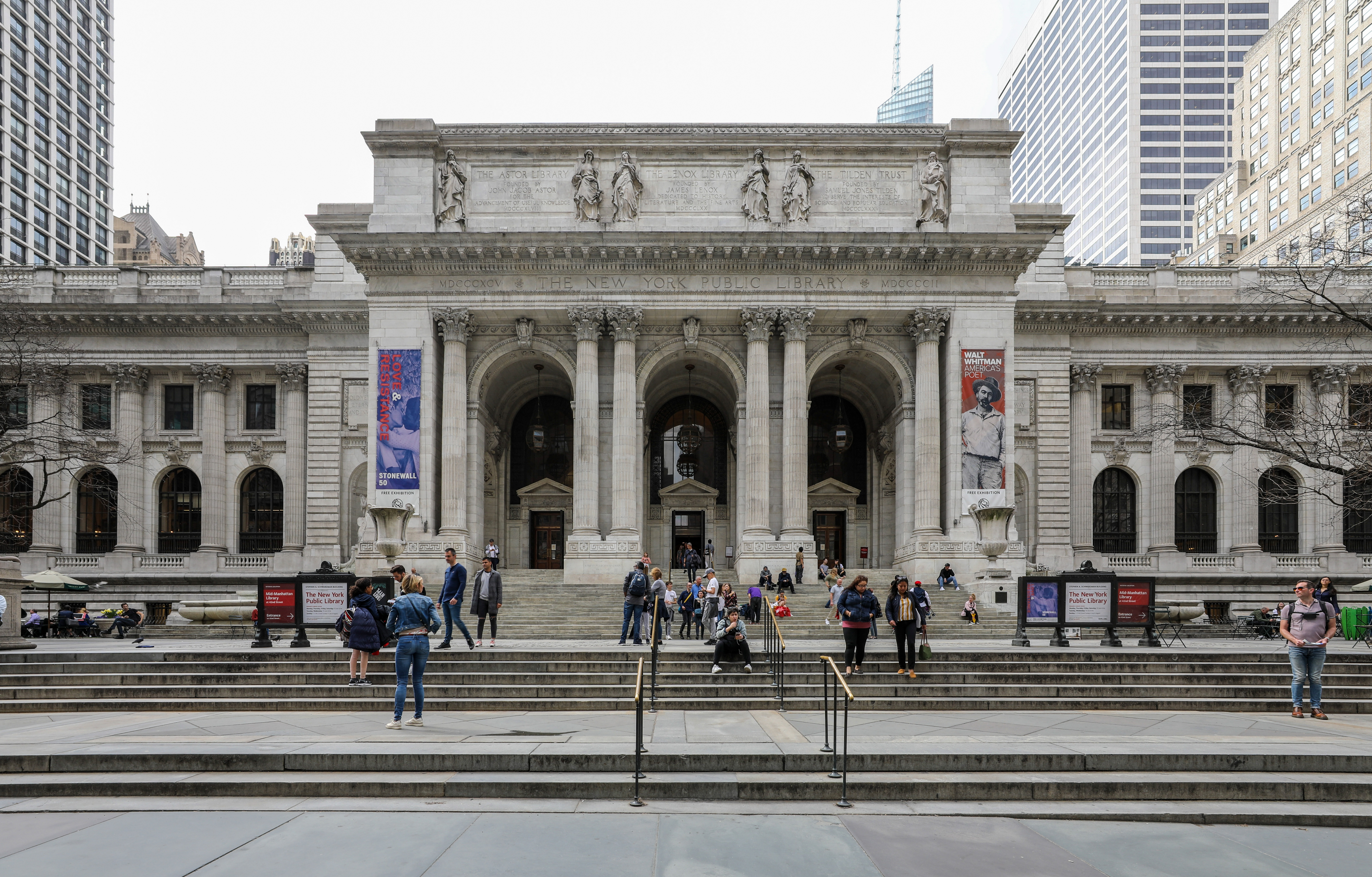
The Stephen A. Schwarzman Headquarters Building of the New York Public Library

The New York Public Library (NYPL) has the largest collection of any public library system in the United States. Queens is served by the Queens Borough Public Library (QPL), the nation's second-largest public library system, while the Brooklyn Public Library (BPL) serves Brooklyn.

More than a million students, the highest number of any city in the United States, are enrolled in New York City's more than 120 higher education institutions, with nearly a quarter million in the City University of New York (CUNY) system alone as of 2025.

The public CUNY system comprises 25 institutions across all five boroughs. The public State University of New York (SUNY) system's campuses in New York City include SUNY Downstate Health Sciences University, Fashion Institute of Technology, SUNY Maritime College, and SUNY College of Optometry. New York City is home to such notable private universities as Adelphi University, Bank Street College of Education, Barnard College, Columbia University, Cooper Union, Fordham University, New York University, New York Institute of Technology, Rockefeller University, Mercy University, Cornell Tech and Yeshiva University; several of these are ranked among the top universities in the world, while some of the world's most prestigious institutions, such as Princeton University and Yale University, are in the New York metropolitan area.

Much of the scientific research in the city is done in medicine and the life sciences. In 2019, the New York metropolitan area ranked first by share of published articles in life sciences. New York City has the most postgraduate life sciences degrees awarded annually in the United States, and in 2012, 43,523 licensed physicians were practicing in New York City. There are 127 Nobel laureates with roots in local institutions as of 2004.

== Culture ==
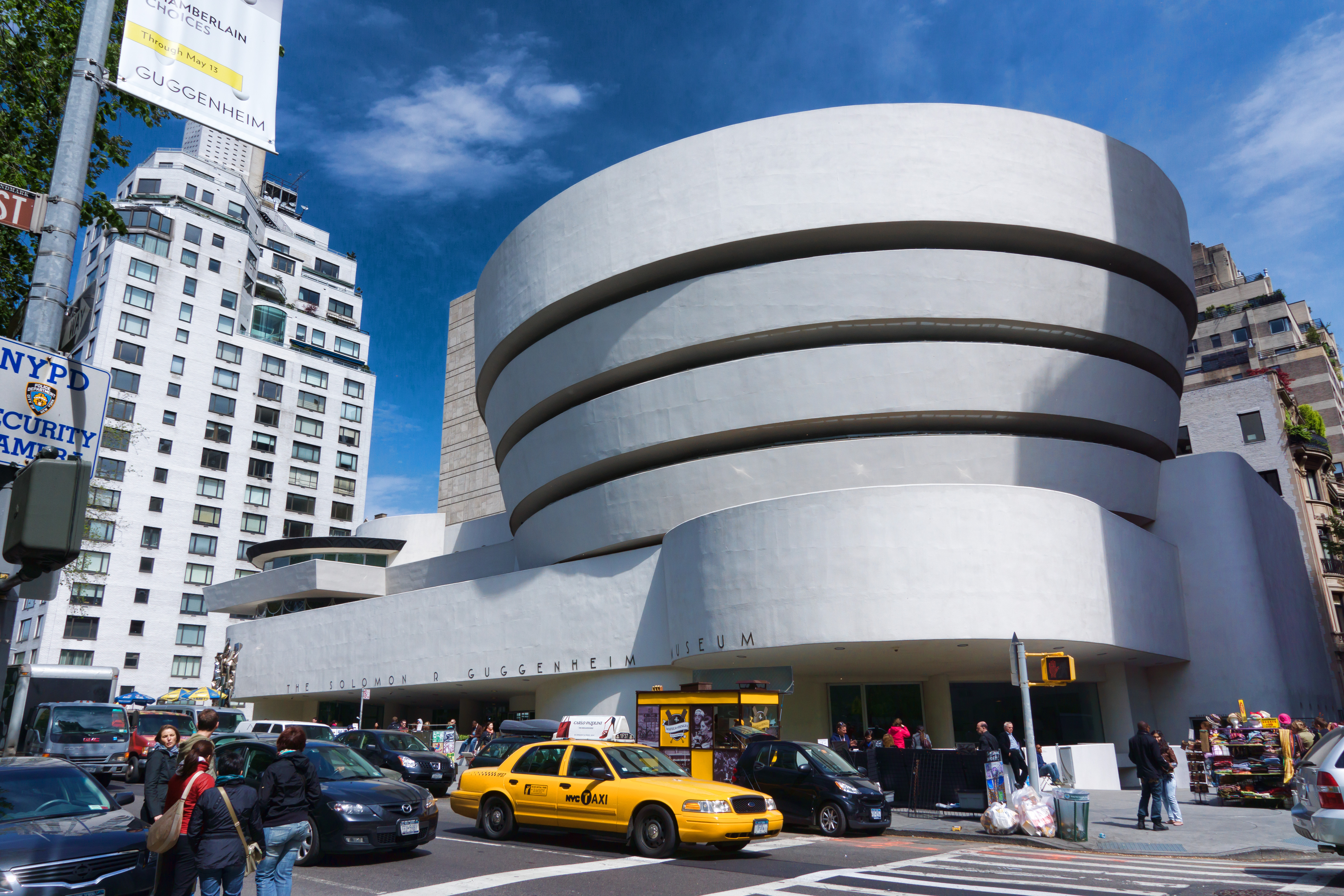
Solomon R. Guggenheim Museum seen from Fifth Avenue

New York City is frequently the setting for novels, movies, and television programs and has been described as the cultural capital of the world. The city is the birthplace of many cultural movements, including the Harlem Renaissance in literature and visual art; abstract expressionism (known as the New York School) in painting; and hip-hop, punk, hardcore, salsa, freestyle, Tin Pan Alley, certain forms of jazz, and (along with Philadelphia) disco in music. New York City has been considered the dance capital of the world.

=== Pace ===
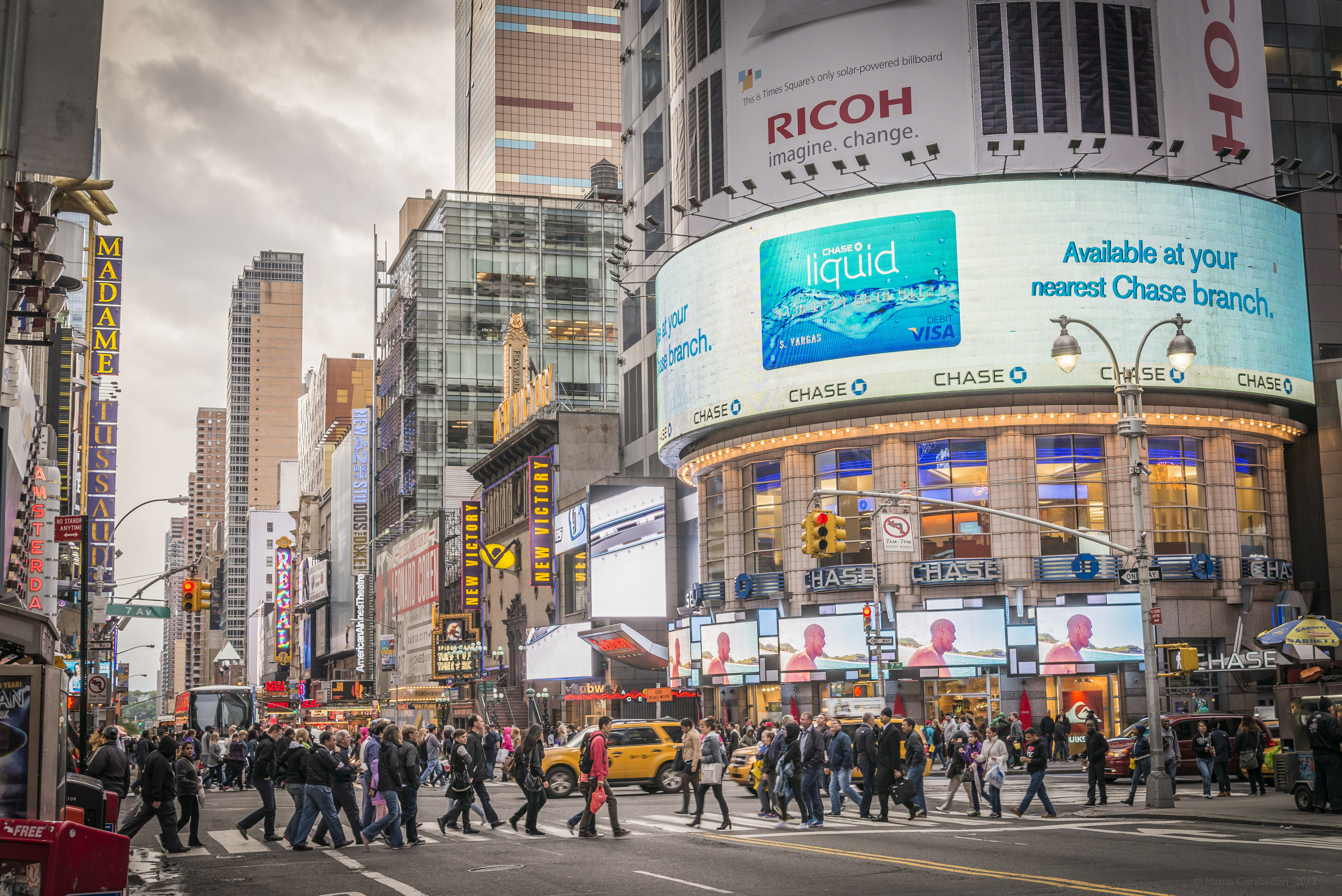
New York is typically characterized by its fast pace of life, which has spawned the term New York minute.

One of the most common traits attributed to New York City is its fast pace, which spawned the term New York minute. New York City's residents are prominently known for their resilience historically, and more recently related to their management of the impacts of the September 11 terrorist attacks and the COVID-19 pandemic. New York was voted the world's most resilient city in 2021 and 2022, per Time Out's global poll of urban residents.

=== Theater ===
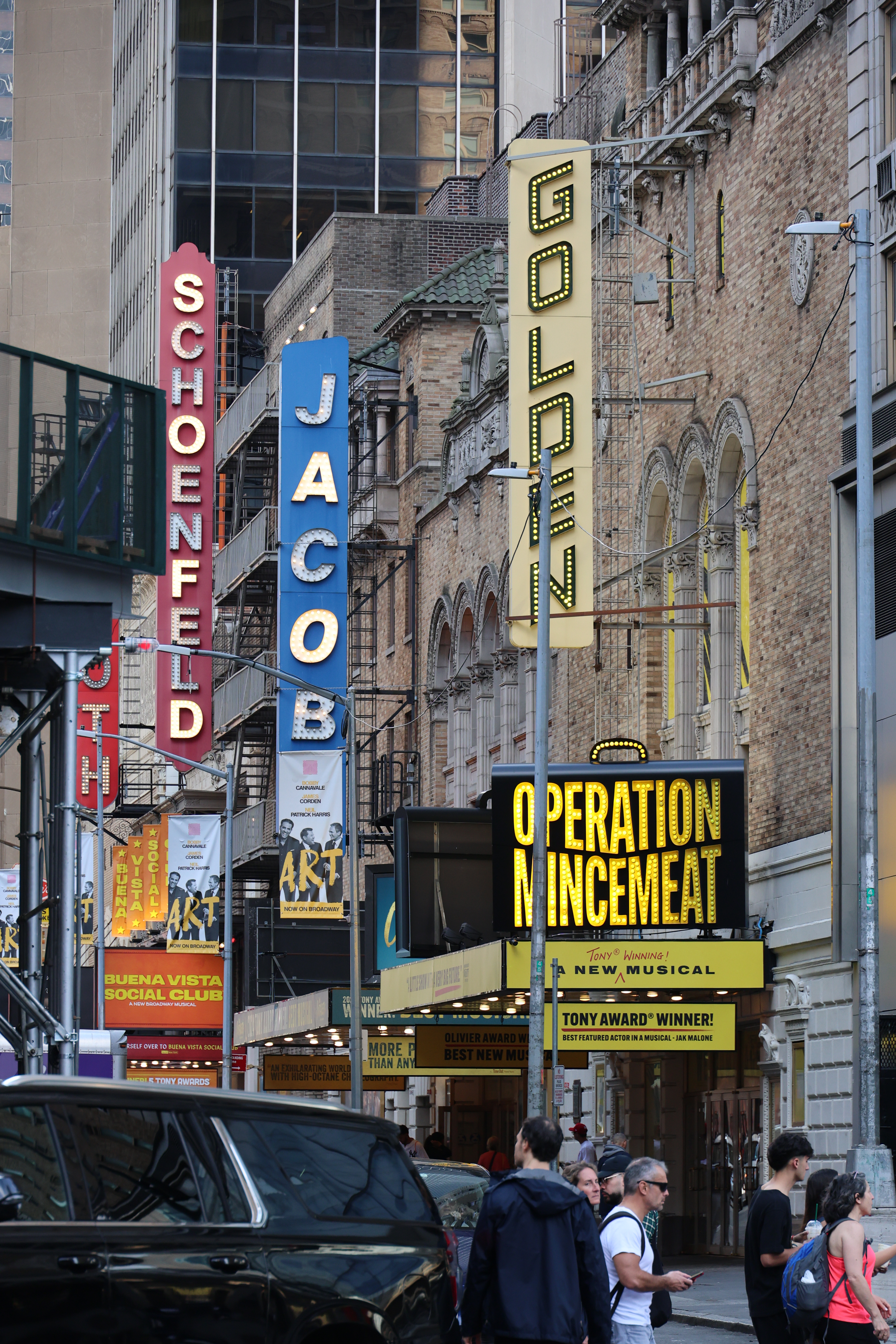
The Golden; Jacobs; Schoenfeld; and Booth theaters in the Theater District

The central hub of the American theater scene is Manhattan, with its divisions of Broadway, off-Broadway, and off-off-Broadway. Many stage and screen stars have gotten their big break working in New York productions.

Broadway theater is one of the premier forms of English-language theater in the world, named after Broadway, the major thoroughfare that crosses Times Square, sometimes referred to as "The Great White Way".

Forty-one theaters, mostly in Midtown Manhattan's Theater District, each with at least 500 seats, are classified as Broadway theaters. The 2018–19 Broadway theater season set records with total attendance of 14.8 million and gross revenue of $1.83 billion Recovering from closures forced by the COVID-19 pandemic, 2022–23 revenues rebounded to $1.58 billion with total attendance of 12.3 million. The Tony Awards recognize excellence in live Broadway theater and are presented annually by the American Theatre Wing and The Broadway League in Manhattan.

=== Accent and dialect ===
The New York area is home to a distinctive regional accent and speech pattern called the New York dialect, alternatively known as Brooklynese or New Yorkese. It has been considered one of the most recognizable accents within American English. The traditional New York area speech pattern is known for its rapid delivery, and its accent is characterized as non-rhotic so that the sound [ɹ] does not appear at the end of a syllable or immediately before a consonant, therefore the pronunciation of the city name as "New Yawk". The classic version of the New York City dialect is centered on middle- and working-class New Yorkers. The influx of non-European immigrants in recent decades has led to changes in this distinctive dialect, and the traditional form of this speech pattern is no longer as prevalent.

=== Architecture ===
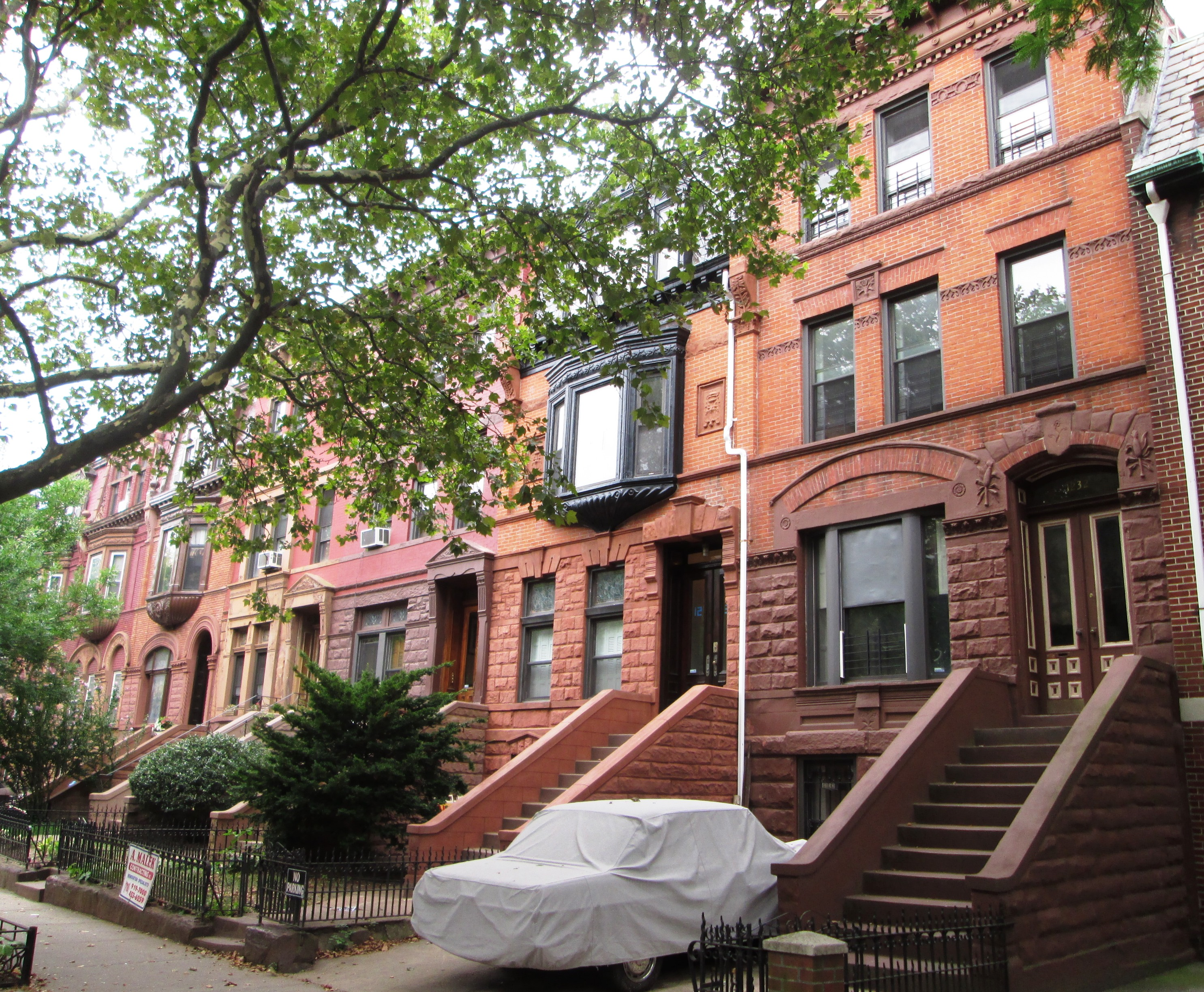
Row houses in Crown Heights North Historic District, Brooklyn

New York has architecturally noteworthy buildings in a wide range of styles and from distinct periods, from the Dutch Colonial Pieter Claesen Wyckoff House in Brooklyn, the oldest section of which dates to 1656, to the modern One World Trade Center, the skyscraper at Ground Zero in Lower Manhattan and the most expensive office tower in the world by construction cost.

Manhattan's skyline, with its many skyscrapers, has been recognized as an iconic symbol of the city, and the city has been home to several of the tallest buildings in the world. As of 2019, New York City had 6,455 high-rise buildings, the third most in the world after Hong Kong and Seoul.

The character of New York's large residential districts is often defined by the elegant brownstone rowhouses and townhouses and shabby tenements that were built during a period of rapid expansion from 1870 to 1930. Stone and brick became the city's building materials of choice after the construction of wood-frame houses was limited in the aftermath of the Great Fire of 1835.

In contrast, New York City also has neighborhoods that are less densely populated and feature free-standing dwellings. In neighborhoods such as Riverdale (in the Bronx), Ditmas Park (in Brooklyn), and Douglaston (in Queens), large single-family homes are common in various architectural styles such as Tudor Revival and Victorian.

High-resolution panorama of Midtown Manhattan, taken from Weehawken, New Jersey, on September 2021

=== Arts ===
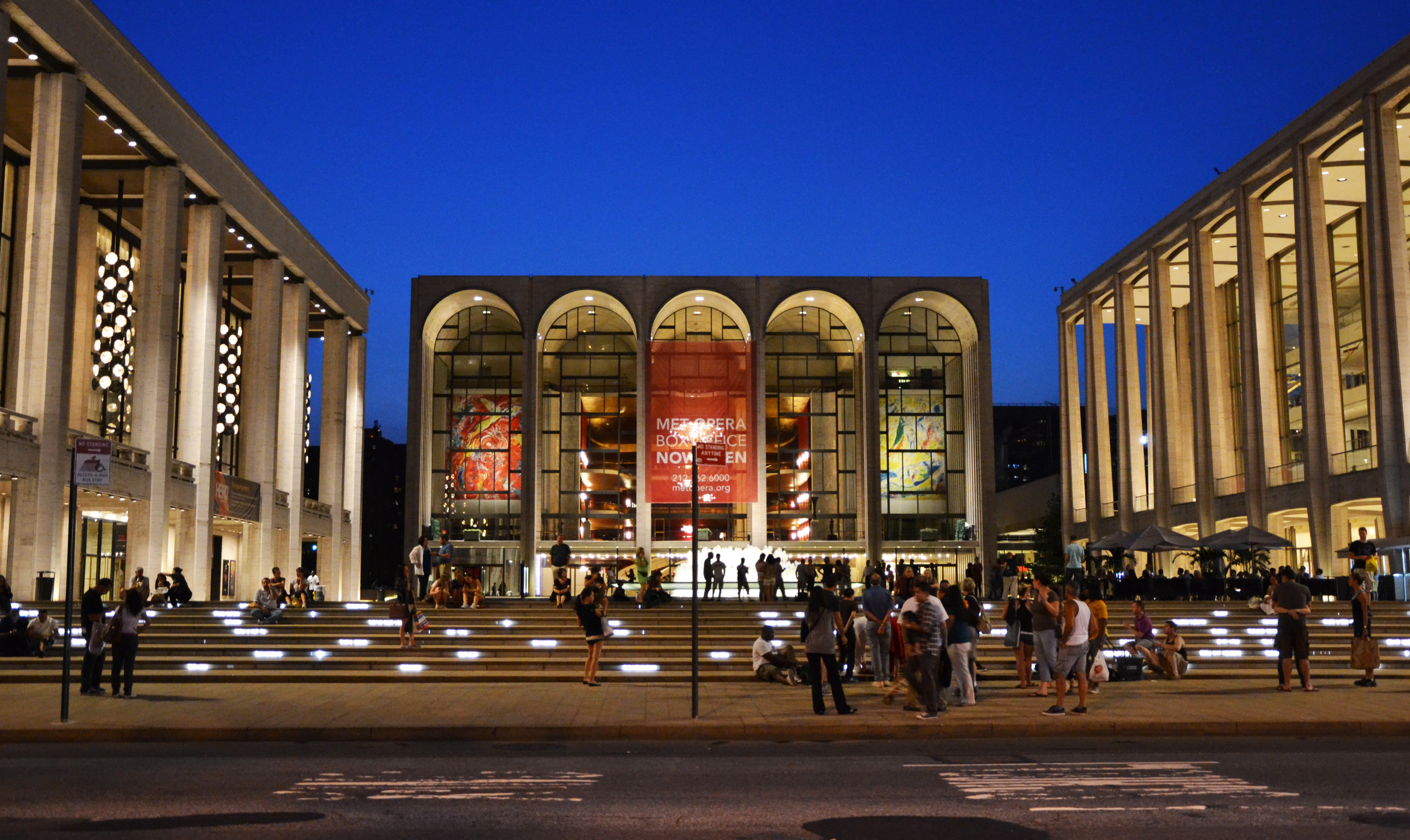
The Lincoln Center: David H. Koch Theater (left), home of the NY City Ballet; Metropolitan Opera House (center), home of the Metropolitan Opera; and David Geffen Hall (right), home of the NY Philharmonic

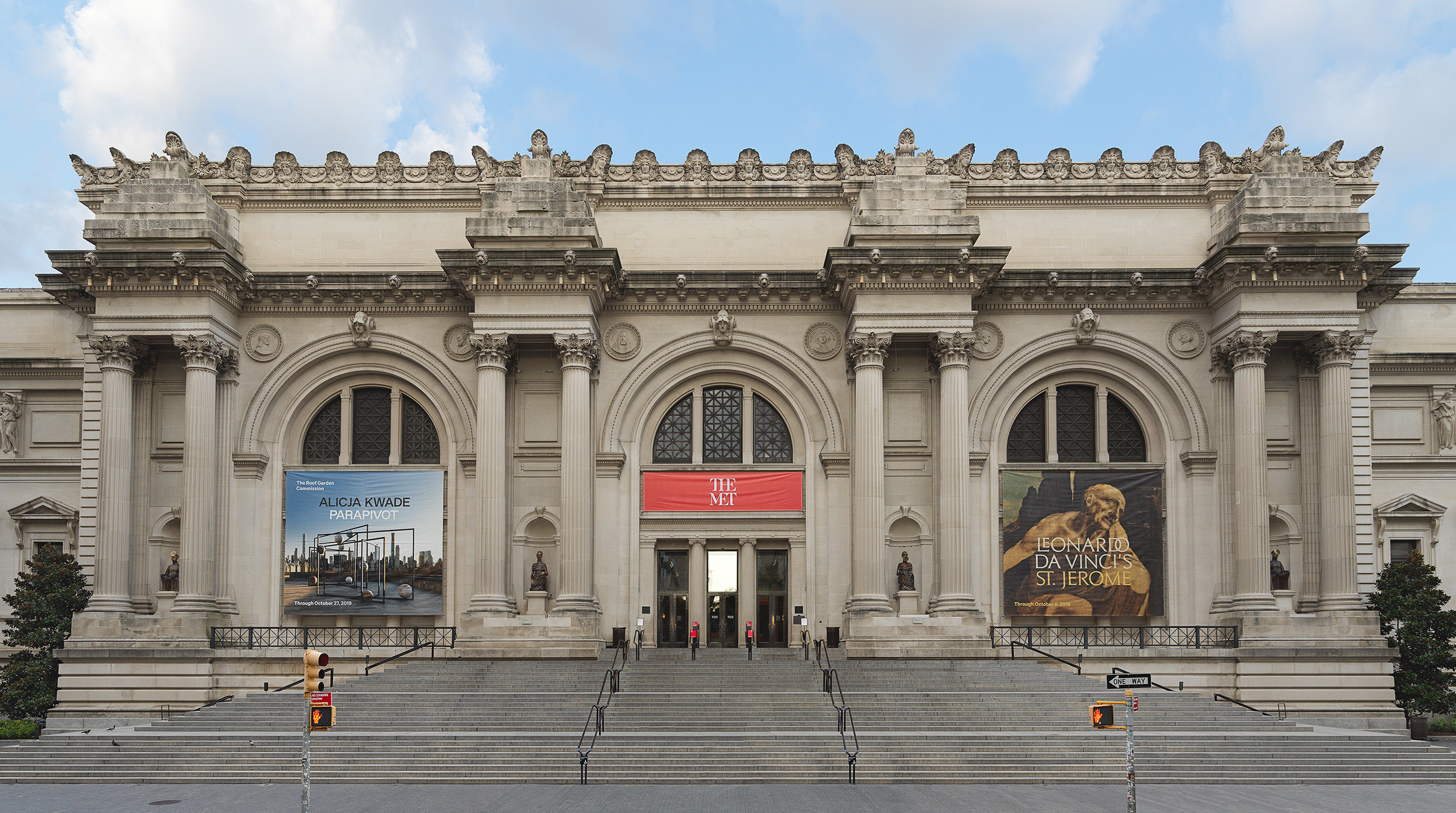
Metropolitan Museum of Art, the largest art museum in the Americas

Lincoln Center for the Performing Arts, anchoring Lincoln Square on the Upper West Side of Manhattan, is home to numerous influential arts organizations, including the Metropolitan Opera, New York City Opera, New York Philharmonic, and New York City Ballet, as well as the Vivian Beaumont Theater, the Juilliard School, Jazz at Lincoln Center, and Alice Tully Hall. The Lee Strasberg Theatre and Film Institute is in Union Square, and Tisch School of the Arts is based at New York University, while Central Park SummerStage presents free concerts in Central Park.

New York City has more than 2,000 arts and cultural organizations and more than 500 art galleries. The city government funds the arts with a larger annual budget than the National Endowment for the Arts. The city is also home to hundreds of cultural institutions and historic sites. Museum Mile is the name for a section of Fifth Avenue running from 82nd to 105th streets on the Upper East Side of Manhattan, in the upper portion of Carnegie Hill.

Nine museums occupy this section of Fifth Avenue, including the Guggenheim, Metropolitan Museum of Art, Neue Galerie New York, the Jewish Museum, and The Africa Center, making it one of the densest displays of high culture in the world. In addition to other programming, the museums collaborate for the annual Museum Mile Festival, held each year in June, to promote the museums and increase visitation. Many of the world's most lucrative art auctions are held in New York City.

The Metropolitan Museum of Art is the largest art museum in the Americas. In 2022, it welcomed 3.2 million visitors, ranking it the third-most visited museum in the country, and eighth-most visited art museum in the world. Its permanent collection contains more than two million works across 17 curatorial departments, and includes works of art from classical antiquity and ancient Egypt; paintings and sculptures from nearly all the European masters; and an extensive collection of American and modern art. The Met maintains extensive holdings of African, Asian, Oceanian, Byzantine, and Islamic art.

=== Cuisine ===
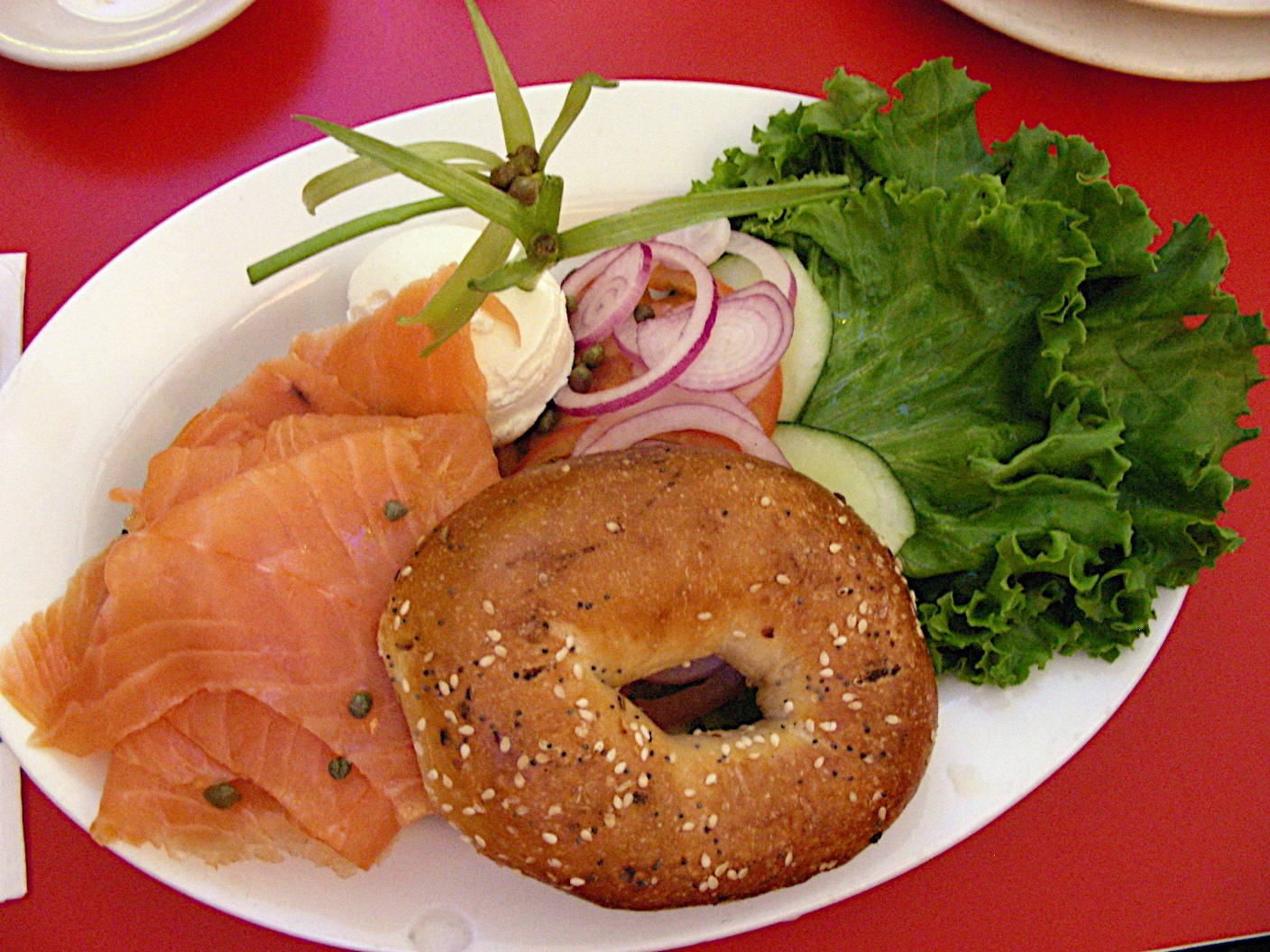
New York–style bagel with lox

New York City's food culture includes an array of international cuisines influenced by the city's long immigrant history. Central and Eastern European immigrants, especially Jewish immigrants from those regions, brought New York-style bagels, cheesecake, hot dogs, knishes, and delicatessens (delis) to the city. Italian immigrants brought New York-style pizza and Italian cuisine into the city, while Jewish immigrants and Irish immigrants brought pastrami and corned beef, respectively. Chinese and other Asian restaurants, sandwich joints, trattorias, diners, and coffeehouses are ubiquitous throughout the city. Some 4,000 mobile food vendors licensed by the city, many immigrant-owned, have made Middle Eastern foods such as falafel and kebabs examples of modern New York street food. The city is home to "nearly one thousand of the finest and most diverse haute cuisine restaurants in the world", according to Michelin. The New York City Department of Health and Mental Hygiene assigns letter grades to the city's restaurants based on inspection results. As of 2019, there were 27,043 restaurants in the city, up from 24,865 in 2017. The Queens Night Market in Flushing Meadows–Corona Park attracts more than ten thousand people nightly to sample food from more than 85 countries.

=== Fashion ===
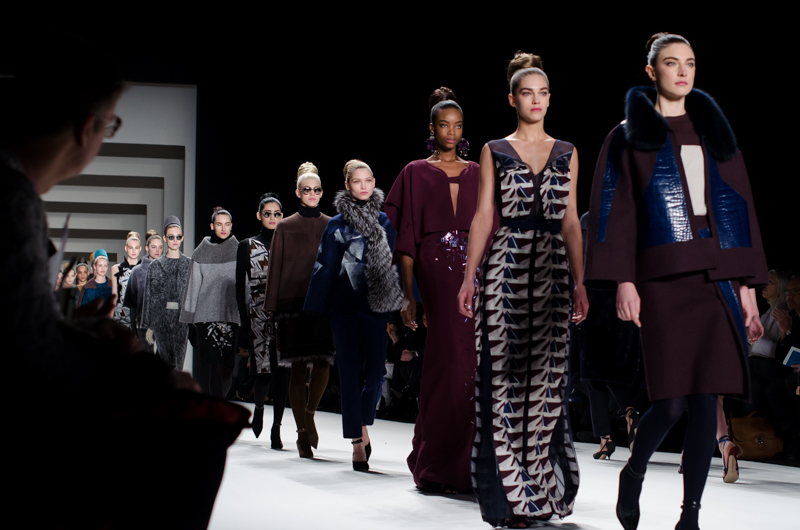
Haute couture fashion models walk the runway during NYFW.

New York City is a global fashion capital, and the fashion industry employs 4.6% of the city's private workforce. New York Fashion Week (NYFW) is a high-profile semiannual event featuring models displaying the latest wardrobes created by fashion designers worldwide in advance of these fashions proceeding to the marketplace.

NYFW sets the tone for the global fashion industry. New York's fashion district encompasses roughly 30 city blocks in Midtown Manhattan, clustered around a stretch of Seventh Avenue nicknamed Fashion Avenue. New York's fashion calendar also includes Couture Fashion Week to showcase haute couture styles. The Met Gala is often described as "Fashion's biggest night".

=== Parades ===
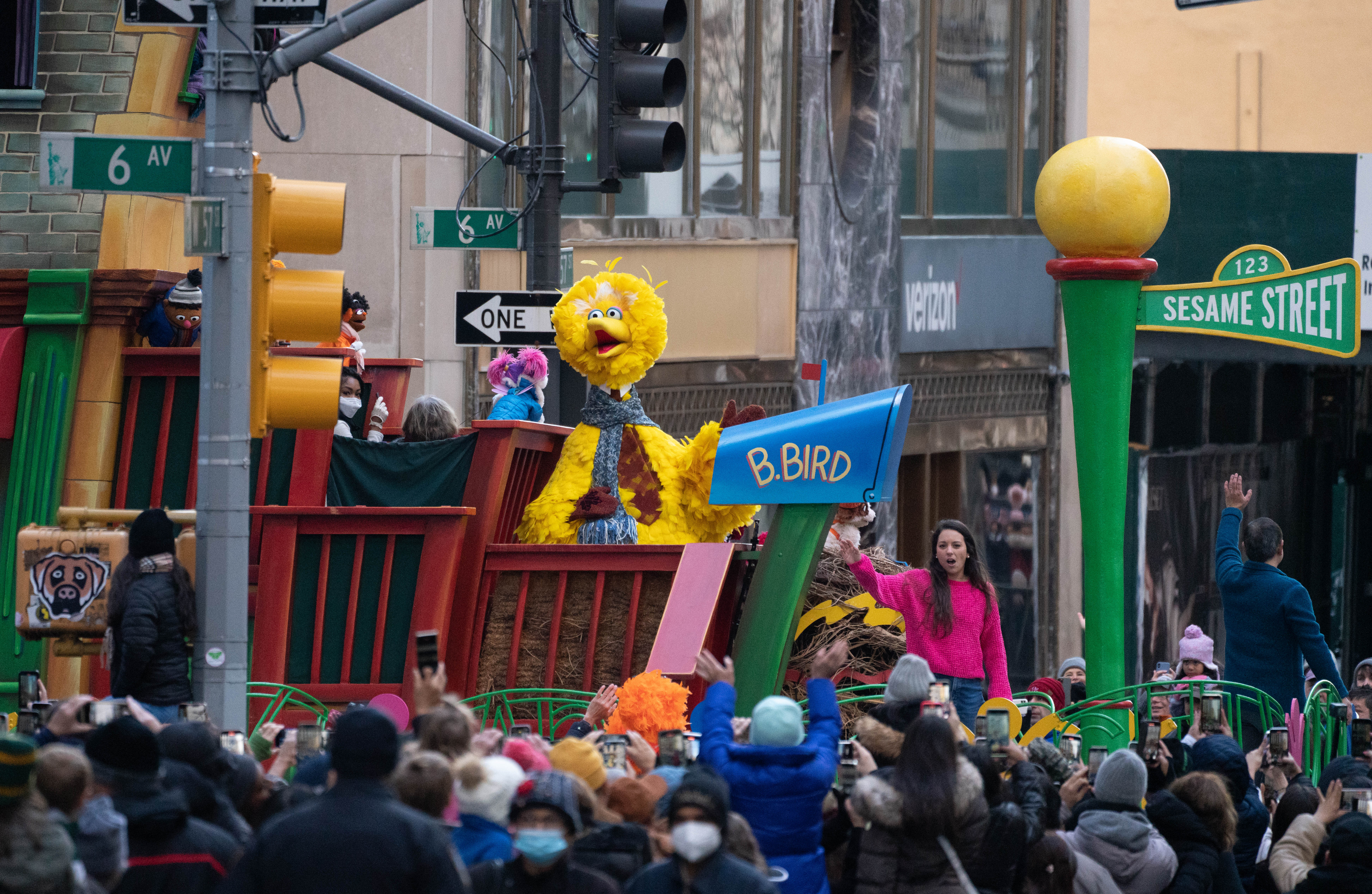
The annual Macy's Thanksgiving Day Parade, the world's largest parade

New York City is well known for its street parades, the majority in Manhattan. The primary orientation of the annual street parades is typically from north to south, marching along major avenues. The annual Macy's Thanksgiving Day Parade is the world's largest parade, beginning alongside Central Park and proceeding southward to the flagship Macy's Herald Square store; the parade is viewed on telecasts worldwide and draws millions of spectators in person. Other notable parades include the annual New York City St. Patrick's Day Parade in March, the NYC LGBT Pride March in June, the LGBT-inspired Greenwich Village Halloween Parade in October, and numerous parades commemorating the independence days of many nations. Ticker-tape parades celebrating championships won by sports teams as well as other accomplishments march northward along the Canyon of Heroes on Broadway from Bowling Green to City Hall Park in Lower Manhattan.

=== Sports ===
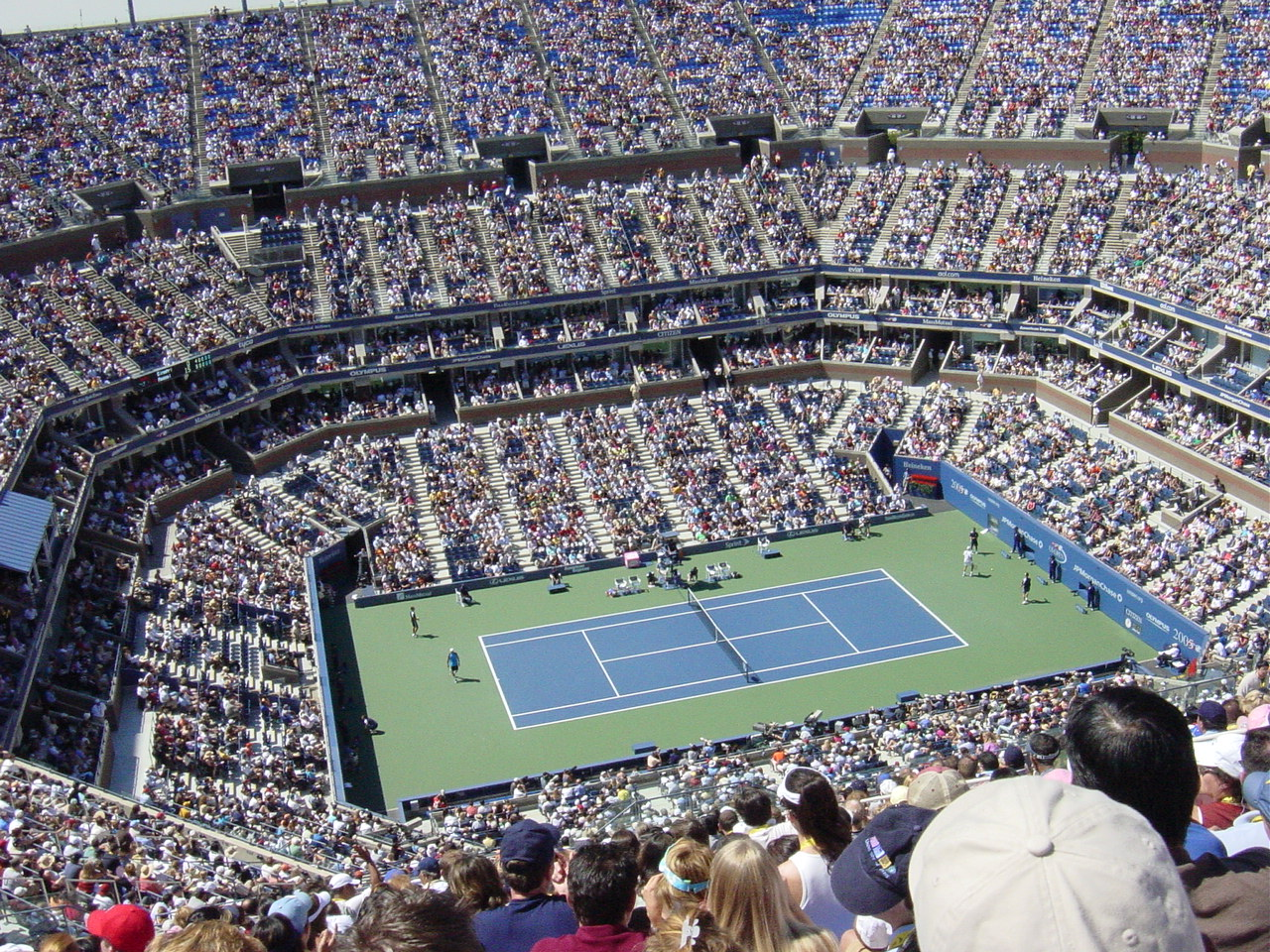
The US Open Tennis Championships in Flushing Meadows–Corona Park in Queens

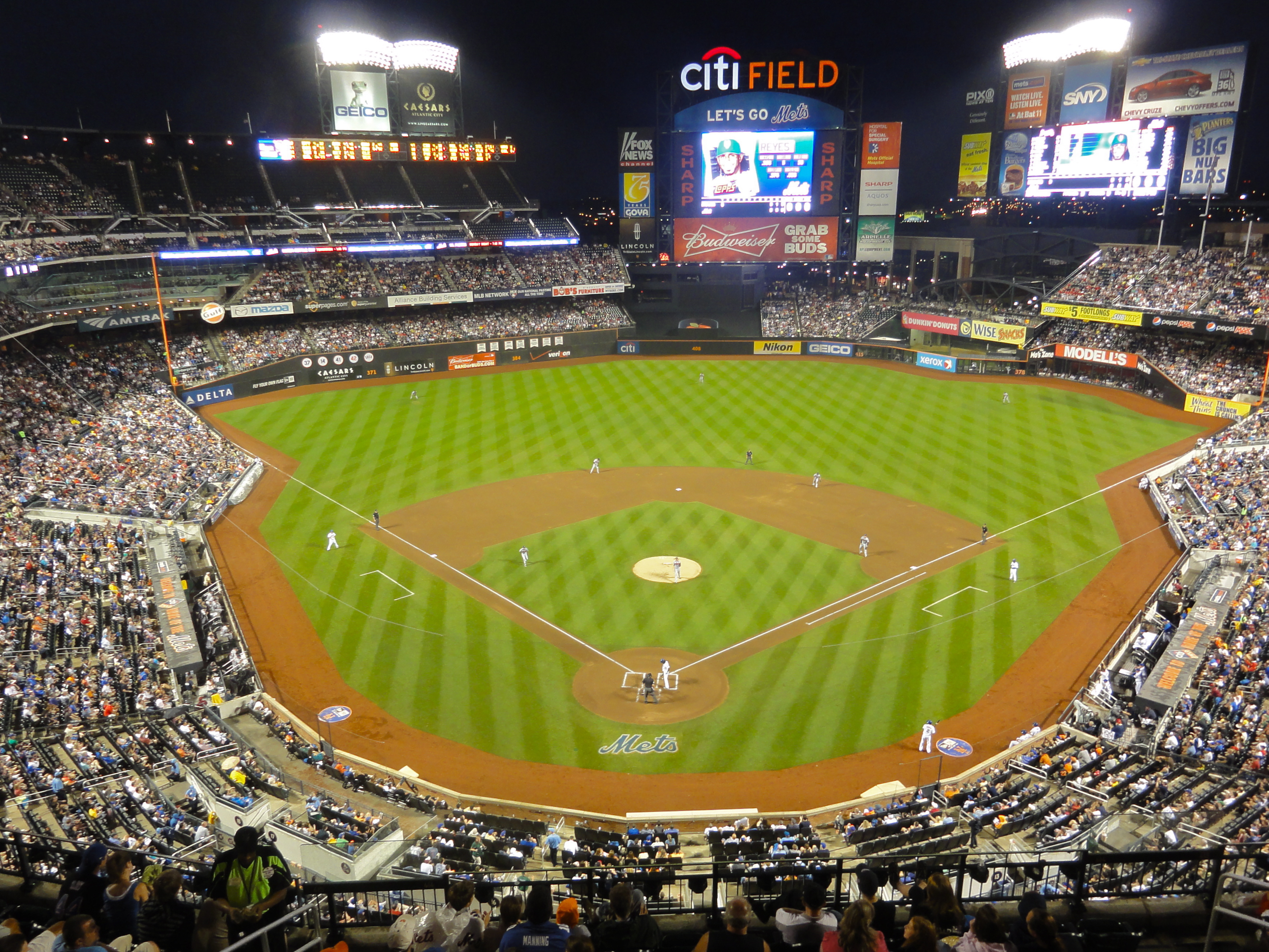
Citi Field, also in Flushing Meadows-Corona Park, has been home to the New York Mets since 2009.

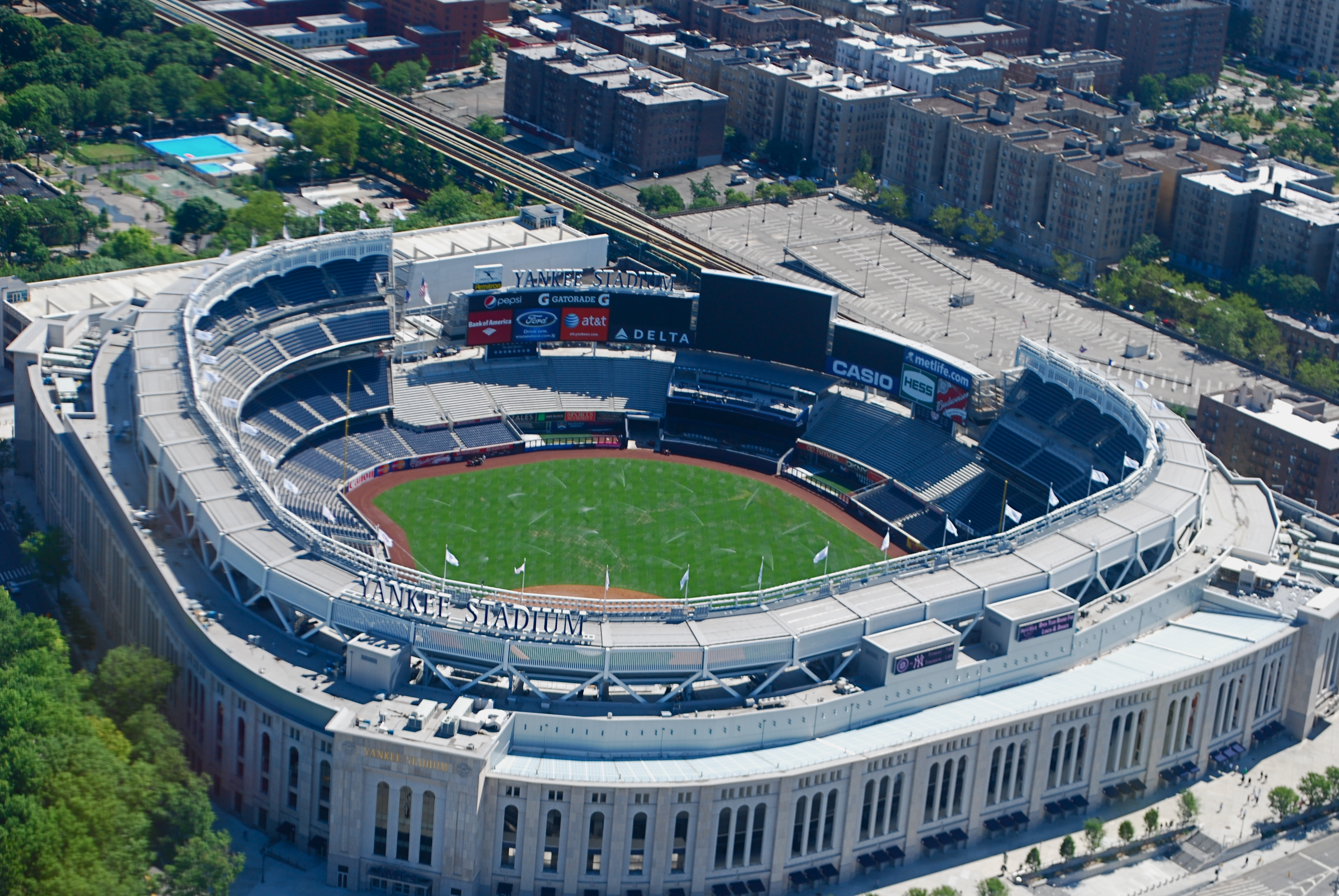
Yankee Stadium in The Bronx is home to the New York Yankees and New York City FC.

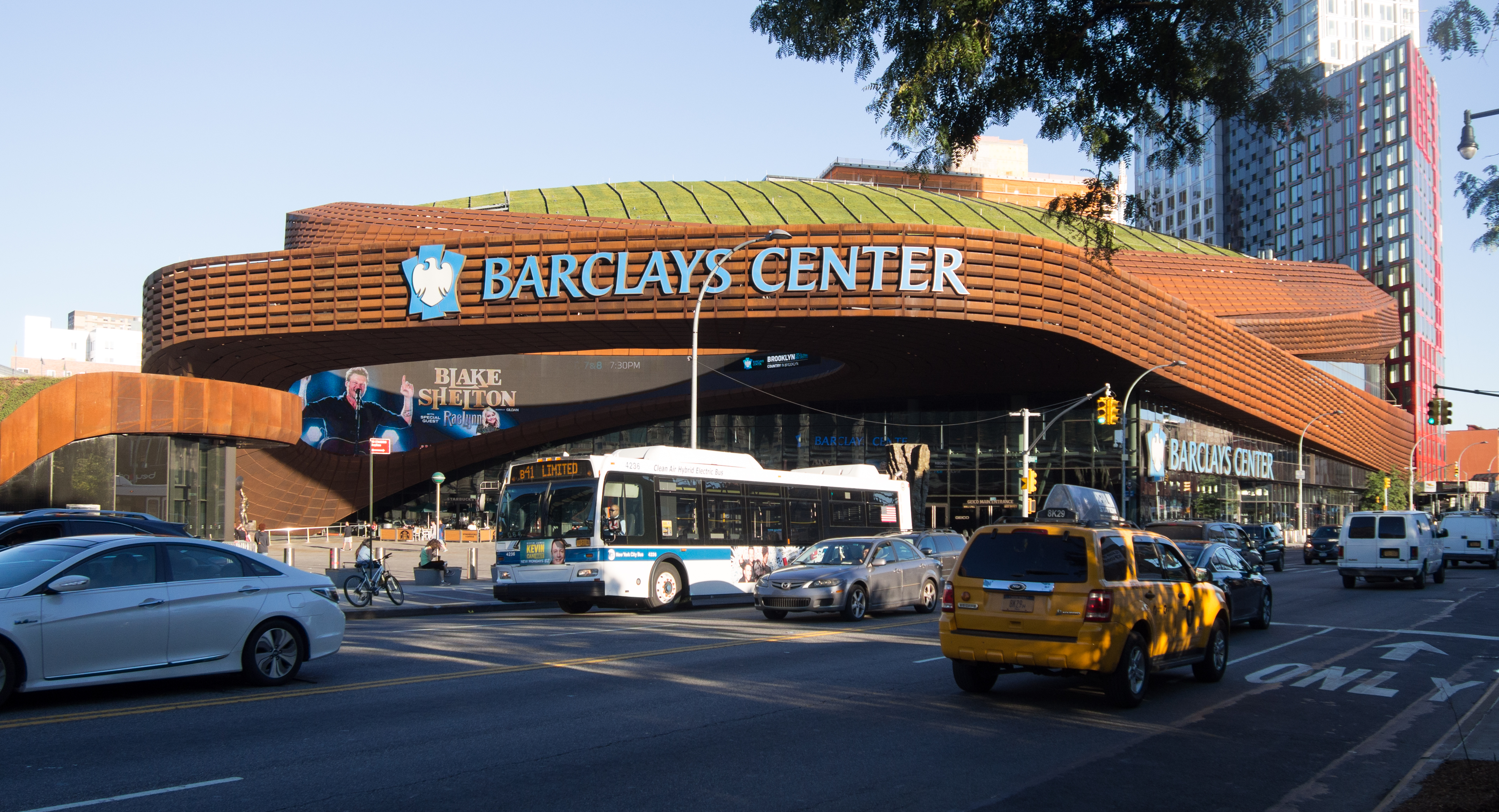
Barclays Center, home to the Brooklyn Nets of the NBA and the New York Liberty of the WNBA

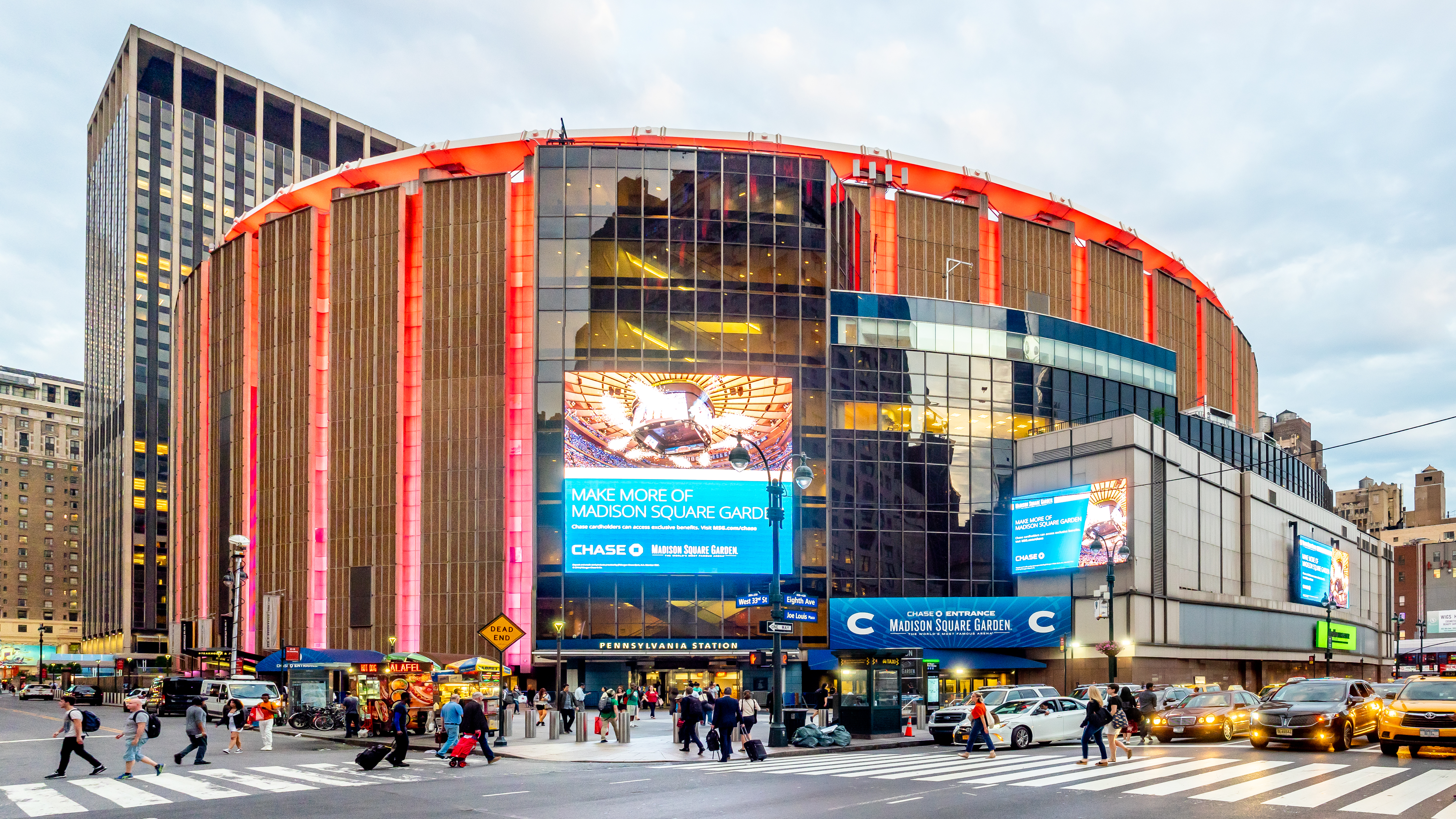
Madison Square Garden, home to the New York Knicks of the NBA and New York Rangers of the NHL

New York City is home to the headquarters of the National Football League, Major League Baseball, the National Basketball Association, the National Hockey League, and Major League Soccer.

New York City hosted the 1984 Summer Paralympics and the 1998 Goodwill Games. New York City's bid to host the 2012 Summer Olympics was one of five finalists, but lost out to London.

The city has played host to more than 40 major professional teams in the five sports and their respective competing leagues. Four of the ten most expensive stadiums ever built worldwide (MetLife Stadium, the new Yankee Stadium, Madison Square Garden, and Citi Field) are in the New York metropolitan area.

The city is represented in the National Football League by the New York Giants and the New York Jets, although both teams play their home games at MetLife Stadium in nearby East Rutherford, New Jersey, which hosted Super Bowl XLVIII in 2014.

The city's two Major League Baseball teams are the New York Mets, who play at 41,800-seat Citi Field in Queens, and the New York Yankees, who play at 47,400-seat Yankee Stadium in the Bronx. The two rivals compete in six games of interleague play every regular season, called the Subway Series. The Yankees have won an MLB-record 27 championships, while the Mets have won the World Series twice. The city was once home to the Brooklyn Dodgers (now the Los Angeles Dodgers), who won the World Series once, and the New York Giants (now the San Francisco Giants), who won the World Series five times. Both teams moved to California in 1958. There is one Minor League Baseball team in the city, the Mets-affiliated Brooklyn Cyclones, and the city gained a club in the independent Atlantic League when the Staten Island FerryHawks began play in 2022.

The city's National Basketball Association teams are the New York Knicks, who play at Madison Square Garden, and the Brooklyn Nets, who play at the Barclays Center. The New York Liberty is the city's Women's National Basketball Association team. The first national college-level basketball championship, the National Invitation Tournament, was held in New York in 1938 and remains in the city.

The metropolitan area is home to three National Hockey League teams. The New York Rangers, one of the league's Original Six, play at Madison Square Garden in Manhattan. The New York Islanders, traditionally representing Long Island, play in UBS Arena in Elmont, New York, but played in Brooklyn's Barclays Center from 2015 to 2020. The New Jersey Devils play at Prudential Center in nearby Newark, New Jersey.

New York City is represented in Major League Soccer by New York City FC, who play their home games at Yankee Stadium, and the New York Red Bulls, who play their home games at Sports Illustrated Stadium in nearby Harrison, New Jersey. Gotham FC in the National Women's Soccer League also plays their home games at Sports Illustrated Stadium and will relocate to Etihad Park in New York City in 2028. Brooklyn FC is a professional soccer club based in Brooklyn, fielding a women's team in the first division USL Super League starting in 2024 and a men's team in the second division USL Championship in 2025. New York was a host city for the FIFA World Cup on two occasions, though all games were played in East Rutherford, New Jersey. For the 1994 FIFA World Cup, matches were played at Giants Stadium, including one of the semi-final games. New York City was one of eleven US host cities for the 2026 FIFA World Cup, with multiple matches, including the final played at MetLife Stadium.

The annual US Open is one of four Grand Slam tennis tournaments and is held at the National Tennis Center in Flushing Meadows–Corona Park. The New York City Marathon, which courses through all five boroughs, is the world's largest running marathon, with a world-record 59,226 finishers in 2025, who came from 132 nations. The Millrose Games is an annual track and field meet held at the Fort Washington Avenue Armory, whose featured event is the Wanamaker Mile. Boxing is a prominent part of the city's sporting scene, with events like the New York Golden Gloves held at Madison Square Garden each year.

== Human services ==
=== Health ===
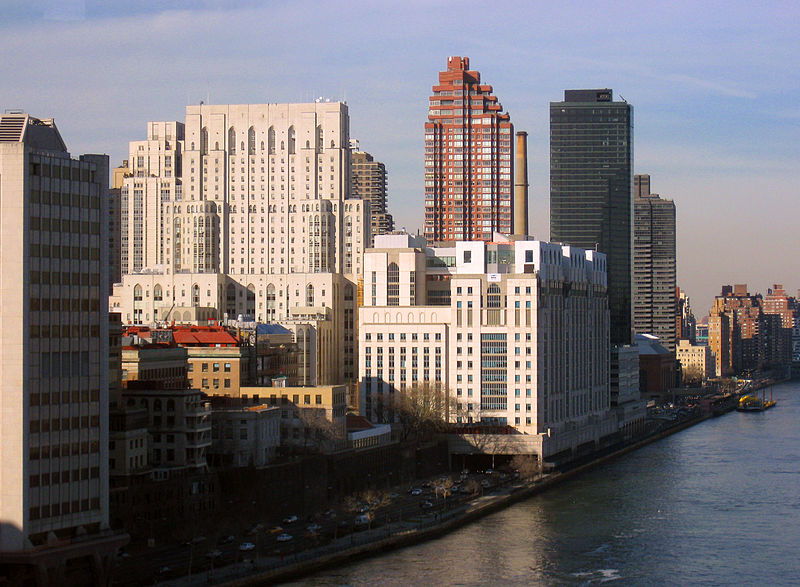
New York-Presbyterian Hospital, affiliated with Columbia University and Cornell University, is the largest hospital and largest private employer in New York City and one of the world's busiest hospitals.

New York City is a center for healthcare and medical training, with employment of over 750,000 in the city's health care sector. Private hospitals in New York City include the Hospital for Special Surgery, Lenox Hill Hospital, Long Island Jewish Medical Center, Memorial Sloan Kettering Cancer Center, Mount Sinai Hospital, NewYork-Presbyterian Hospital, and NYU Langone Health. Medical schools include SUNY Downstate College of Medicine in Brooklyn, Albert Einstein College of Medicine in the Bronx, and CUNY School of Medicine, Touro College of Osteopathic Medicine, Columbia University Vagelos College of Physicians and Surgeons, Weill Cornell Medicine, Icahn School of Medicine at Mount Sinai, and New York University School of Medicine in Manhattan.

NYC Health + Hospitals (HHC) is a public-benefit corporation established in 1969 which operates the city's public hospitals and a network of outpatient clinics. As of 2021, HHC is the largest American municipal healthcare system with $10.9 billion in annual revenues. HHC serves 1.4 million patients, including more than 475,000 uninsured city residents. HHC operates eleven acute-care hospitals, four skilled nursing facilities, six diagnostic and treatment centers, and more than 70 community-based primary care sites, serving primarily the city's poor and working-class residents. HHC's MetroPlus Health Plan is one of New York City's largest providers of government-sponsored health insurance, enrolling 670,000 city residents as of June 2022.

HHC's facilities annually provides service to millions of New Yorkers, interpreted in more than 190 languages. The best-known hospital in the HHC system is Bellevue Hospital, the oldest public hospital in the United States, established in 1736. Bellevue is the designated hospital for treatment of the president and other world leaders should they require care while in New York City.

The city banned smoking in most parts of restaurants in 1995 and prohibited smoking in bars, restaurants, and places of public employment in 2003. Pharmacies are banned from selling smoked and vaped products in New York State.

New York City enforces a right-to-shelter law guaranteeing shelter to anyone who needs it, regardless of their immigration, socioeconomic, or housing status, which entails providing adequate shelter and food. As a result, while New York has the highest total homeless population of American cities, in 2024 only 5% were unsheltered by the city, representing a significantly lower percentage of outdoor homelessness than in other cities. As of 2023, there were 92,824 homeless people sleeping nightly in the shelter system.

=== Public safety ===
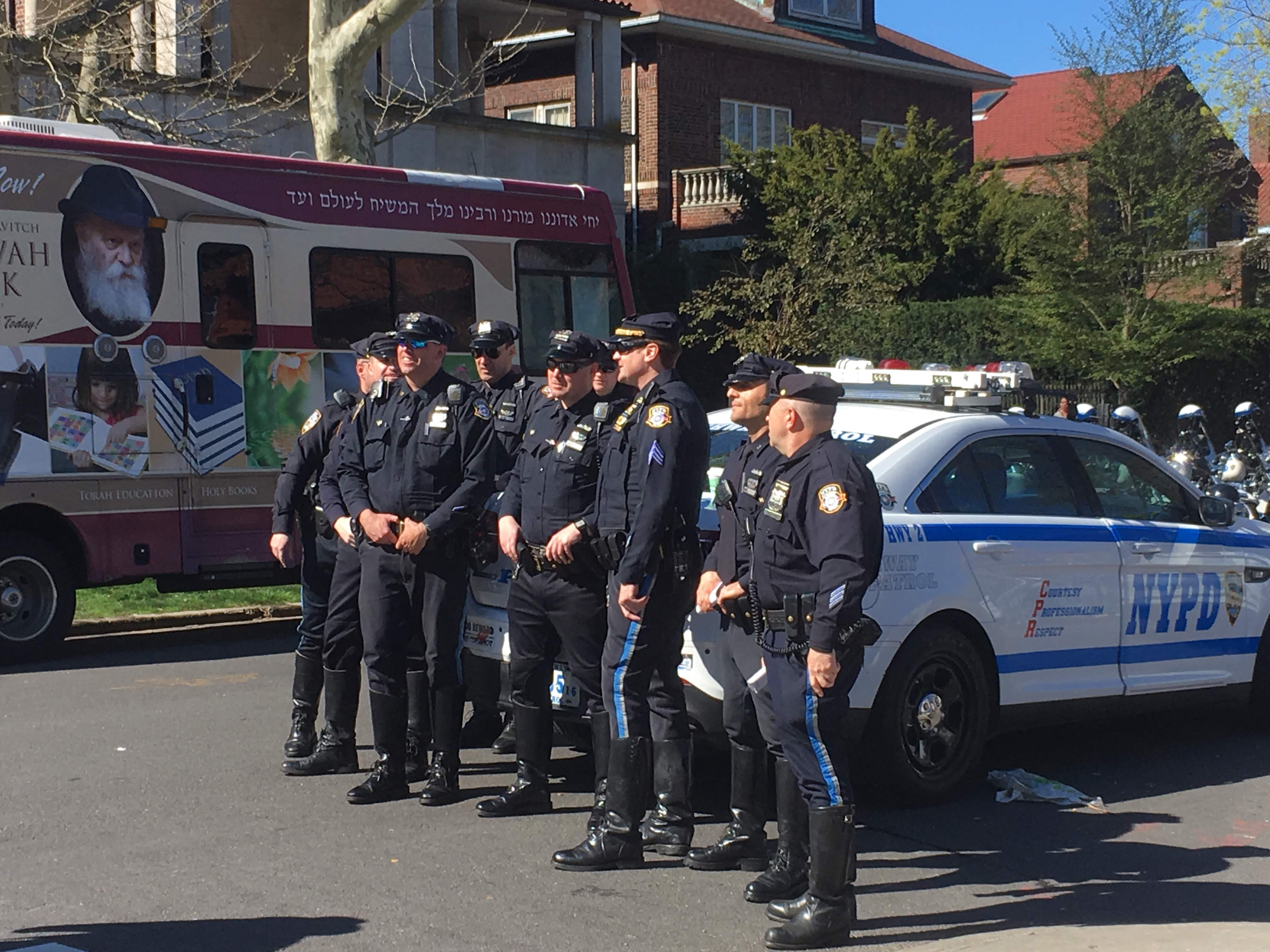
New York Police Department (NYPD) police officers in Brooklyn

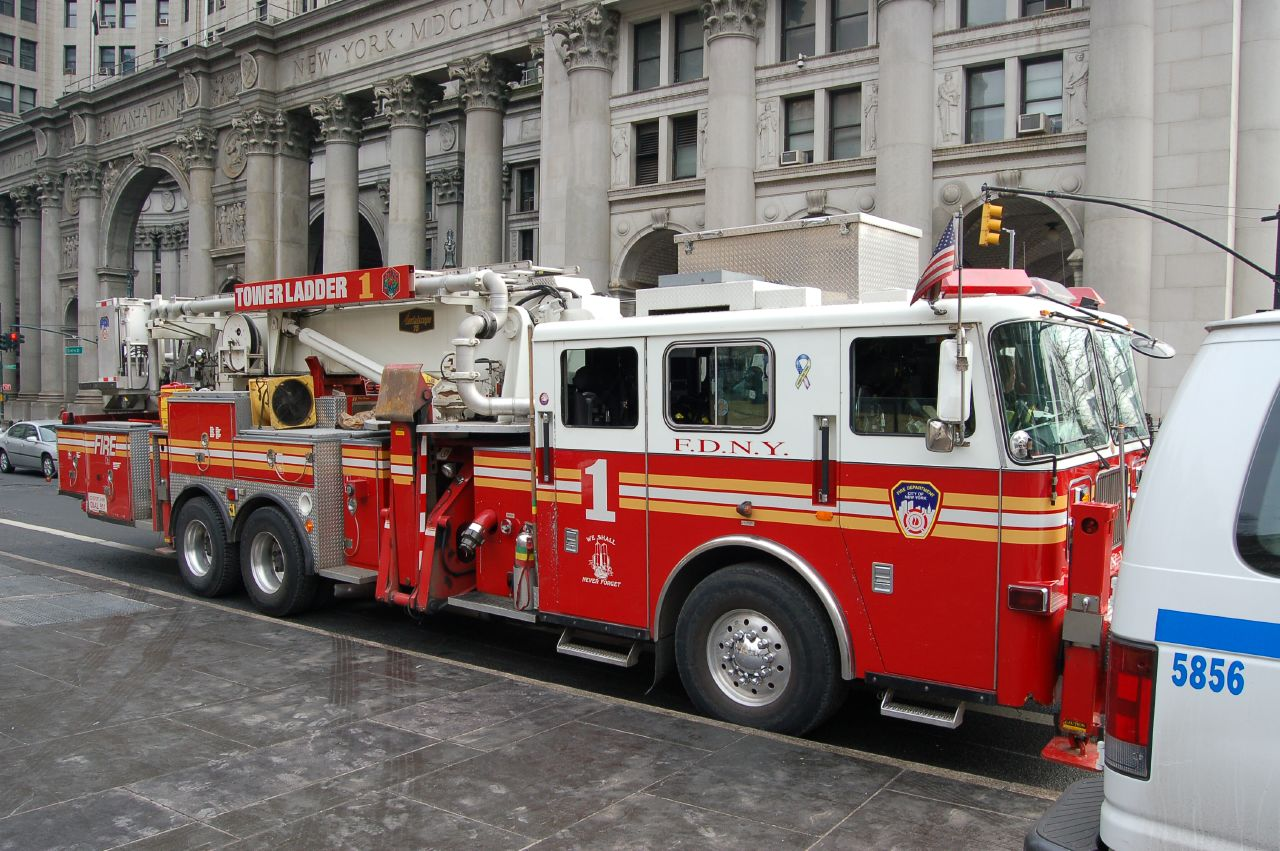
The Fire Department of New York (FDNY), the largest municipal fire department in the United States

The New York Police Department (NYPD) is the largest police force in the United States, with more than 36,000 sworn officers. Members of the NYPD are frequently referred to by politicians, the media, and their own police cars by the nickname, New York's Finest.

The city saw a spike in crime in the 1970s through the 1990s. Crime overall has trended downward in New York City since the 1990s; violent crime decreased more than 75% from 1993 to 2005, and continued decreasing during periods when the nation as a whole saw increases. The NYPD's stop-and-frisk program was declared unconstitutional in 2013 as a "policy of indirect racial profiling" of Black and Mixed residents, although claims of disparate impact continued in subsequent years. The stop-and-frisk program had been widely credited as being behind the decline in crime, though rates continued dropping in the years after the program ended.

The city set a record high of 2,245 murders in 1990 and hit a near-70-year record low of 289 in 2018. The number of murders and the rate of 3.3 per 100,000 residents in 2017 was the lowest since 1951. New York City recorded 386 murders in 2023, a decline of 12% from the previous year. New York City had one of the lowest homicide rates among the ten largest U.S. cities at 5.5 per 100,000 residents in 2021.

New York City has stricter gun laws than most other cities in the United States—a license to own any firearm is required, and the NY SAFE Act of 2013 banned assault weapons. New York State had the fifth-lowest gun death rate of the states in 2020.

Organized crime has long been associated with New York City, beginning with the Forty Thieves and the Roach Guards in the Five Points neighborhood in the 1820s, followed by the Tongs in the same neighborhood, which ultimately evolved into Chinatown, Manhattan. The 20th century saw a rise in the Mafia, dominated by the Five Families, as well as in gangs, including the Black Spades. The Mafia and gang presence has declined in the city in the 21st century.

The Fire Department of New York (FDNY) provides fire protection, technical rescue, primary response to biological, chemical, and radioactive hazards, and emergency medical services. FDNY faces multifaceted firefighting challenges in many ways unique to New York. In addition to responding to building types that range from wood-frame single family homes to high-rise structures, the FDNY responds to fires that occur in the New York City Subway. Secluded bridges and tunnels, as well as large parks and wooded areas that can give rise to brush fires, also present challenges. The FDNY is headquartered at 9 MetroTech Center in Downtown Brooklyn, and the FDNY Fire Academy is on Randalls Island.

== Transportation ==
=== Rapid transit ===
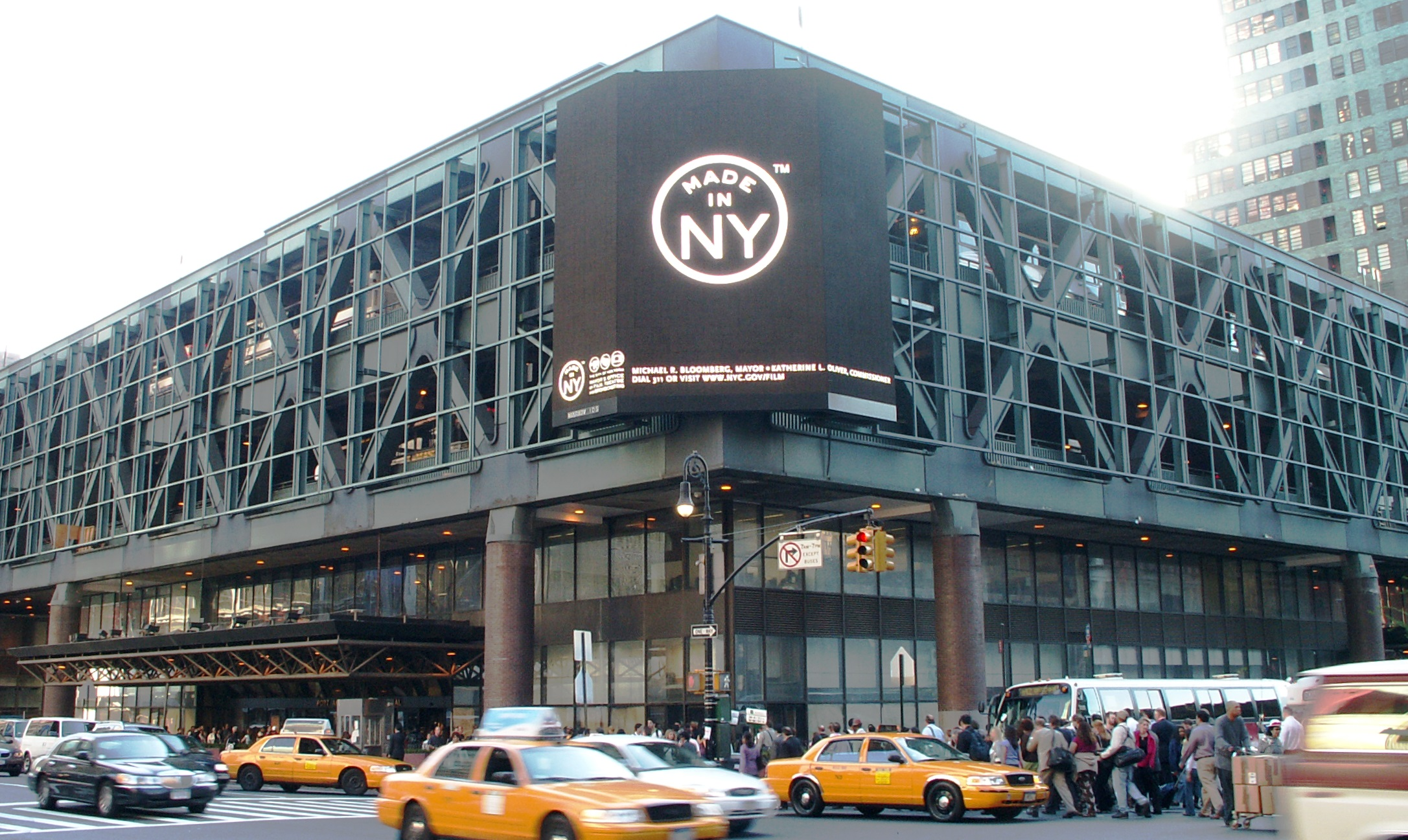
Port Authority Bus Terminal, the world's busiest bus station, at Eighth Avenue and 42nd Street

Mass transit in New York City, most of which runs 24 hours a day, accounts for one in every three users of mass transit in the country, and two-thirds of the nation's rail riders live in the New York City metropolitan area.

==== Buses ====
New York City's public bus fleet runs 24/7 and is the largest in North America. The New York City bus system serves the most passengers of any city in the nation: In 2022, MTA New York City Transit's buses served 483.5 million trips, while MTA Regional Bus Operations handled 100.3 million trips.

The Port Authority Bus Terminal is the city's main intercity bus terminal and the world's busiest bus station, serving 250,000 passengers on 7,000 buses each workday in a building opened in 1950 that was designed to accommodate 60,000 daily passengers. A 2021 plan announced by the Port Authority would spend $10 billion to expand capacity and modernize the facility. In 2024, the Port Authority announced plans for a new terminal that would feature a glass atrium at a new main entrance on 41st Street.

==== Rail ====
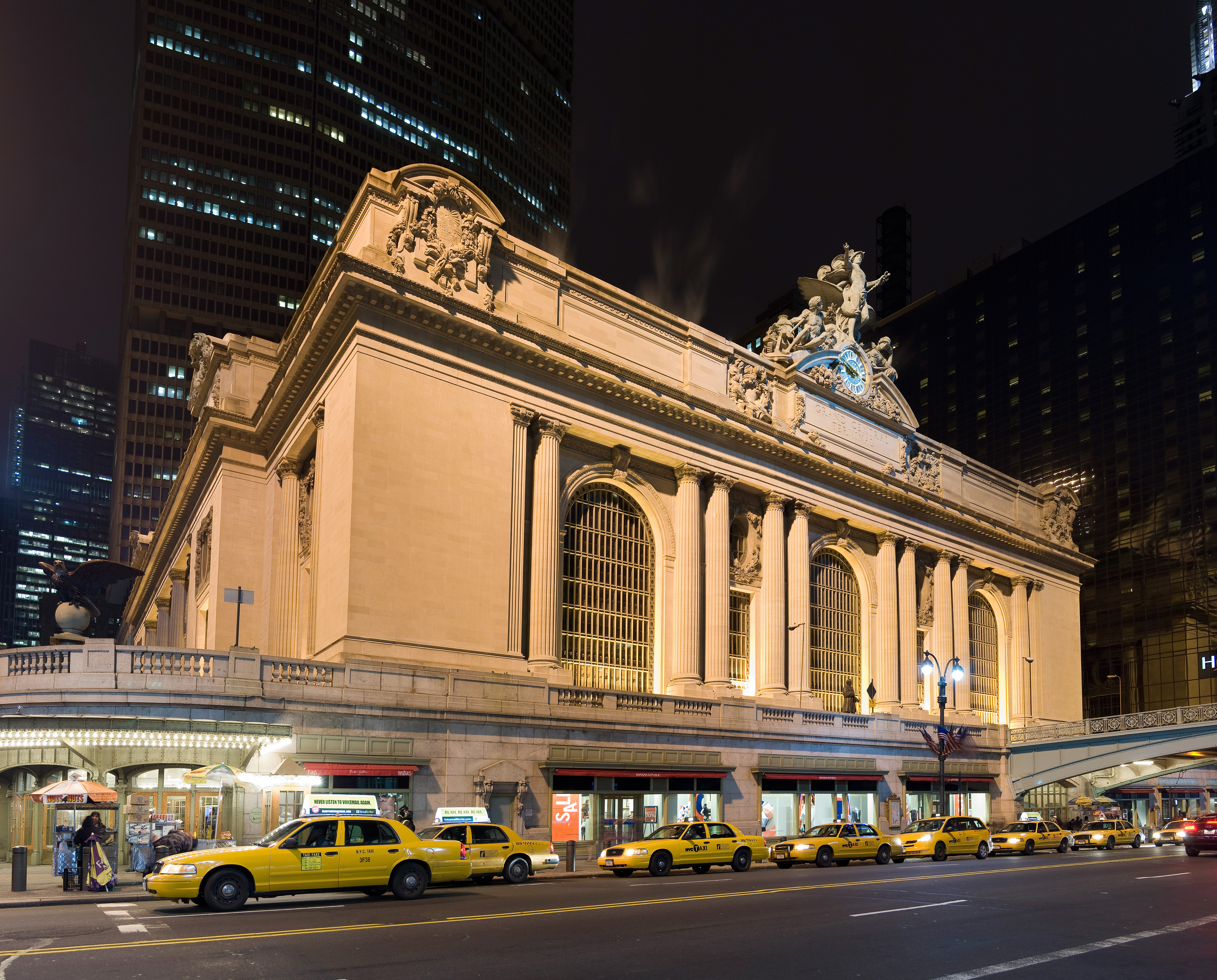
New York City is home to the two busiest train stations in the United States, Grand Central Terminal (pictured) and New York Penn Station.

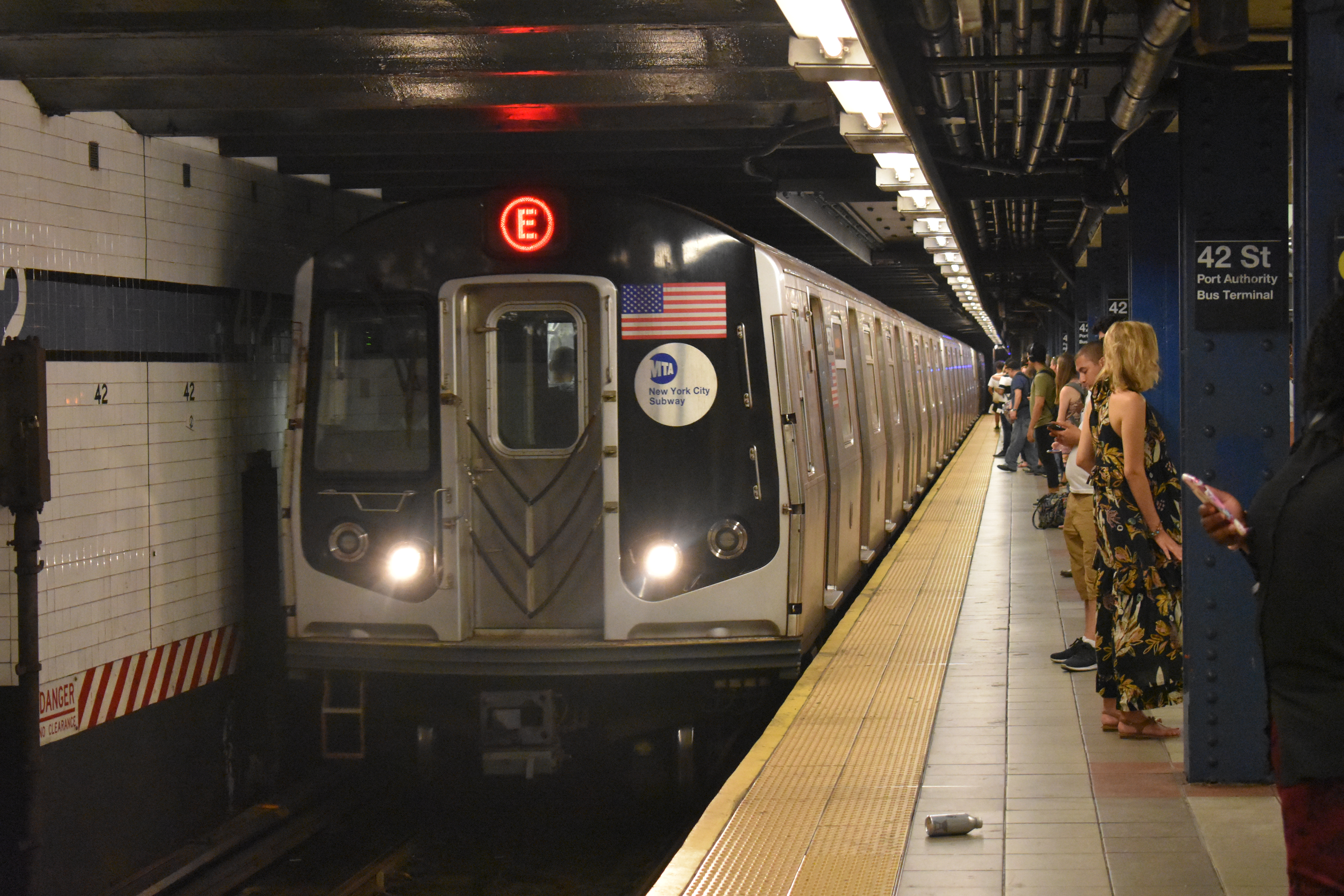
The New York City Subway, one of the world's largest metro systems.

Opened on October 27, 1904, the New York City Subway is one of the world's oldest public transit systems, and the one with the most stations, with 423 stations in operation (472, if stations connected by transfers are counted multiple times). Nearly all of New York's subway system is open 24 hours a day, in contrast to the overnight shutdown common to most subway systems. The New York City Subway is the busiest metropolitan rail transit system in the Western Hemisphere, with 1.28 billion passenger rides in 2025.

Public transport is widely used in New York City. 54.6% of New Yorkers commuted to work in 2005 using mass transit. This is in contrast to the rest of the country, where 91% of commuters travel in automobiles to their workplace. According to the New York City Comptroller, workers in the New York City area spend an average of 6 hours and 18 minutes getting to work each week, the longest commute time in the nation among large cities. New York is the only American city in which a majority (52%) of households do not have a car; only 22% of Manhattanites own a car. Due to their high usage of mass transit, New Yorkers spend less of their household income on transportation than the national average, saving $19 billion annually on transportation compared to other urban Americans.

New York City's commuter rail network is the largest in North America. The rail network, connecting New York City to its suburbs, consists of the Long Island Rail Road, Metro-North Railroad, and New Jersey Transit. The combined systems converge at Grand Central Terminal and New York Penn Station and contain more than 250 stations and 20 rail lines. The elevated AirTrain JFK in Queens connects JFK International Airport to the New York City Subway and the Long Island Rail Road. For inter-city rail, New York City is served by Amtrak, whose busiest station by a significant margin is Penn Station on the West Side of Manhattan, from which Amtrak provides connections to Boston, Philadelphia, and Washington, D.C. along the Northeast Corridor, and long-distance train service to other North American cities.

The Staten Island Railway rapid transit system solely serves Staten Island, operating 24 hours a day, with access to Manhattan from the St. George Terminal via the Staten Island Ferry. The PATH train links Midtown and Lower Manhattan with Hoboken Terminal and Newark Penn Station in New Jersey, and then those stations with the World Trade Center Oculus across the Hudson River. Like the New York City Subway, the PATH operates 24 hours a day, meaning three of the five American rapid transit systems that operate on 24-hour schedules are wholly or partly in New York. Grand Central Terminal is the world's largest train station by number of rail platforms and acres occupied.

Multibillion-dollar heavy rail transit projects under construction in New York City include the Second Avenue Subway.

=== Air ===
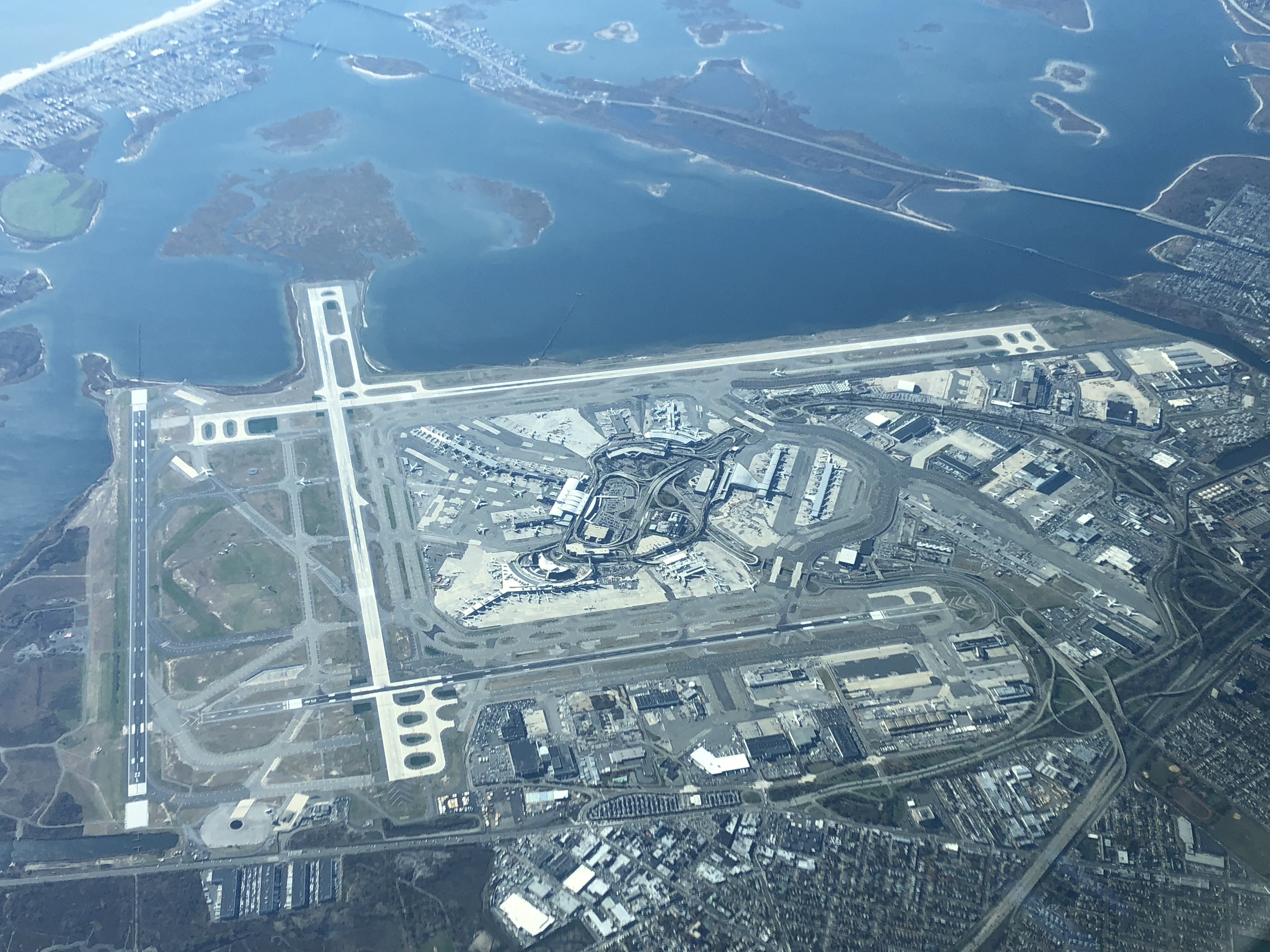
John F. Kennedy Airport in Queens

New York's airspace is the busiest in the United States and one of the world's busiest air corridors. The three busiest airports in the New York metropolitan area are John F. Kennedy International Airport (with 55.3 million passengers), Newark Liberty International Airport (43.6 million) and LaGuardia Airport (29.0 million); 127.9 million travelers used these three airports in 2022. JFK and Newark Liberty were the busiest and fourth-busiest U.S. gateways for international air passengers, respectively, in 2023. As of 2022, JFK was the busiest airport for international passengers in North America, with 26.8 million international passengers.

Described in 2014 by then–Vice President Joe Biden as the kind of airport travelers would see in "some third world country", LaGuardia Airport has undergone an $8 billion project with federal and state support that has replaced its aging facilities with modern terminals and roadways. Plans have advanced to expand passenger volume at a fourth airport, Stewart International Airport, near Newburgh, New York, by the Port Authority of New York and New Jersey. Other commercial airports in or serving the New York metropolitan area include Long Island MacArthur Airport, Trenton–Mercer Airport and Westchester County Airport. The primary general aviation airport serving the area is Teterboro Airport.

=== Ferries, taxis and trams ===
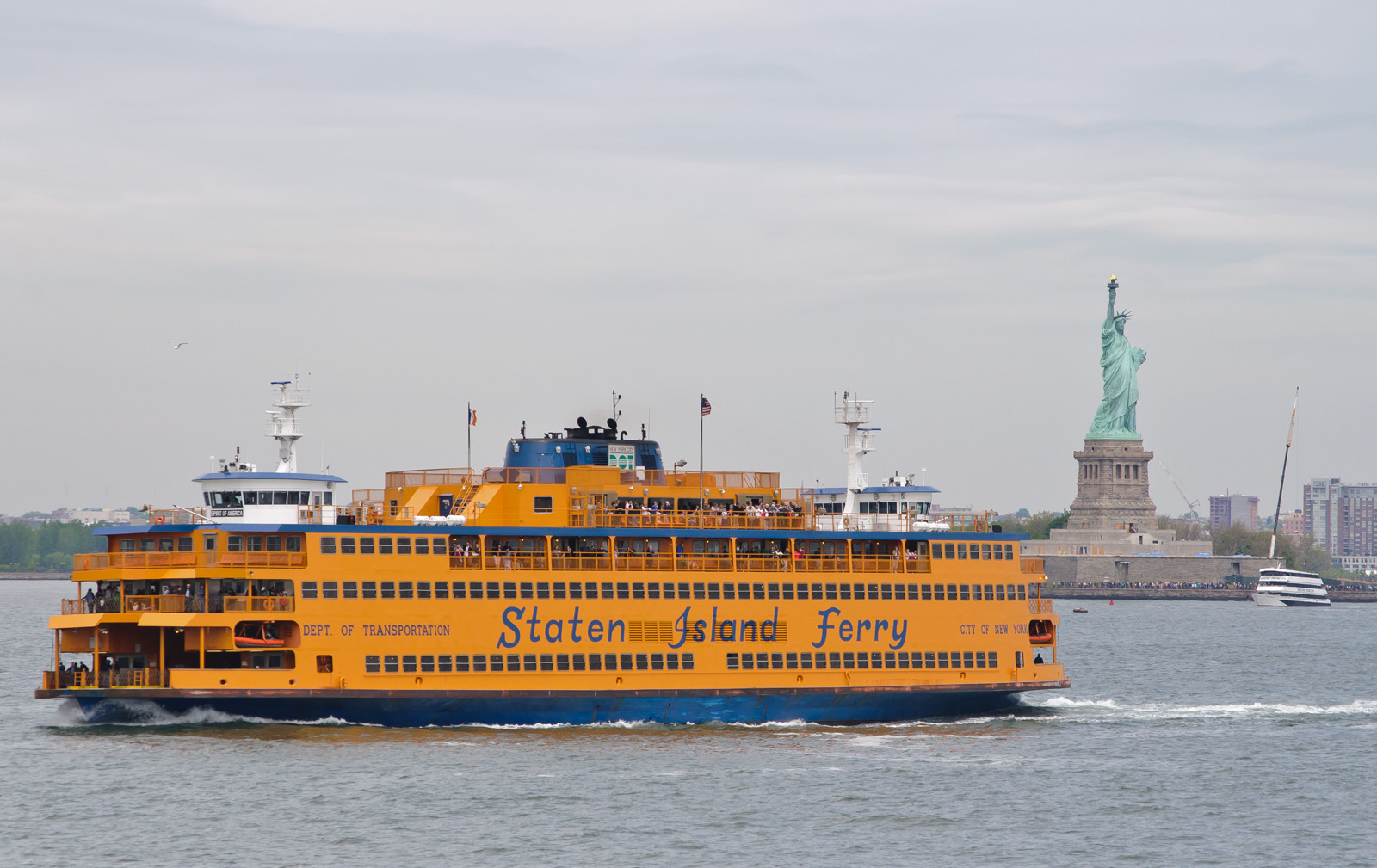
The Staten Island Ferry shuttles commuters between Manhattan and Staten Island.

The Staten Island Ferry is the world's busiest ferry, carrying more than 23 million passengers from July 2015 through June 2016 on a 5.2-mile (8.4 km) route between Staten Island and Lower Manhattan and running 24/7. Other ferry systems shuttle commuters between Manhattan and other locales within the city and the metropolitan area. NYC Ferry, a NYCEDC initiative with routes planned to travel to all five boroughs, was launched in 2017.

Identified by their color and taxi medallion, the city's 13,587 yellow taxicabs are the only vehicles allowed to pick up riders making street hails throughout the city. Apple green-colored boro taxis can pick up street hails in Upper Manhattan and the four outer boroughs. Long dominated by yellow taxis, high-volume for-hire vehicles from Uber and Lyft have provided the most trips in the city since December 2016, when the for-hire vehicles and cabs each had about 10.5 million trips. By October 2023, the 78,000 vehicles-for-hire combined for 20.3 million trips, while 3.5 million trips were in yellow taxis.

The Roosevelt Island Tramway, an aerial tramway that began operation in 1976, transports 2 million passengers per year the 3,140 feet (960 m) between Roosevelt Island and 59th Street and Second Avenue on Manhattan Island.

=== Cycling network ===
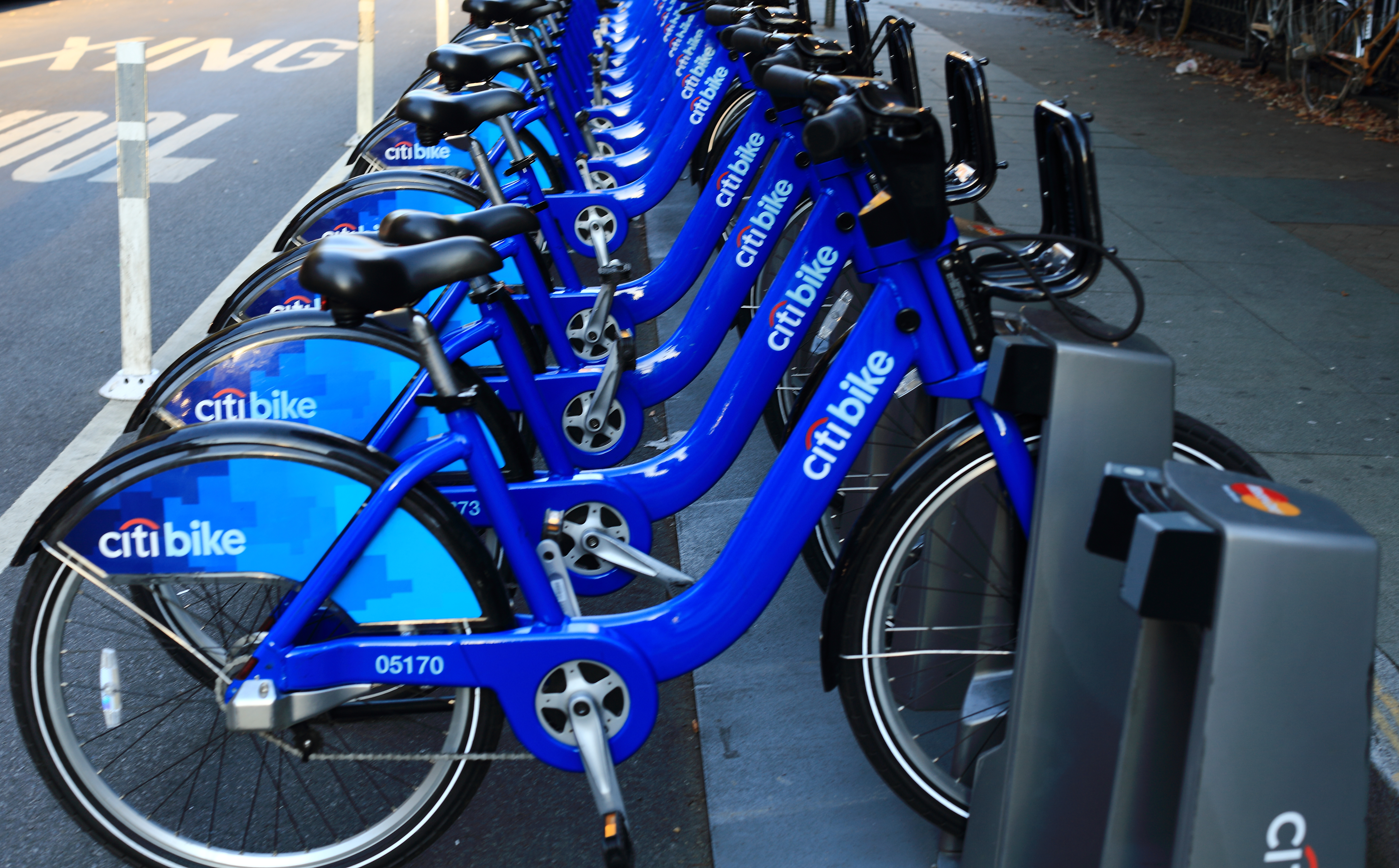
Citi Bike bike share service, which started in May 2013

New York City has mixed cycling conditions, which include urban density, relatively flat terrain, congested roadways with stop-and-go traffic, and many pedestrians. The city's large cycling population includes utility cyclists, such as delivery and messenger services; recreational cycling clubs; and an increasing number of commuters. Cycling is increasingly popular in New York City; in 2022 there were approximately 61,200 people who commuted daily using a bicycle and 610,000 daily bike trips, both nearly doubling over the previous decade. As of 2022, New York City had 1,525 miles (2,454 km) of bike lanes, including 644 miles (1,036 km) of segregated or "protected" bike lanes citywide.

=== Streets and highways ===
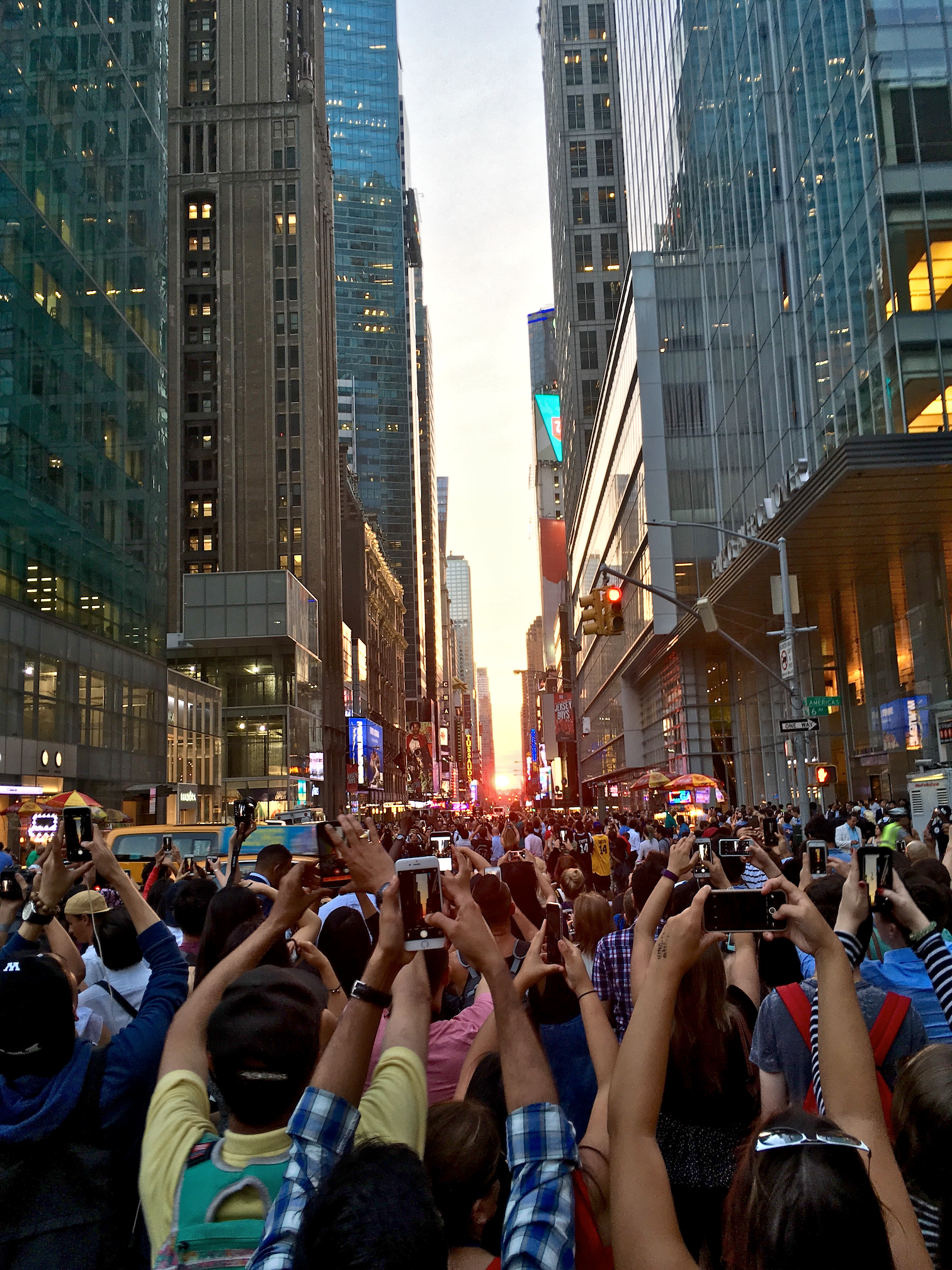
Tourists observing Manhattanhenge on 42nd Street on July 12, 2016

Streets are also a defining feature of the city. New York has been found to lead the world in urban automobile traffic congestion. The Commissioners' Plan of 1811 greatly influenced its physical development. New York City has an extensive web of freeways and parkways, which link the city's boroughs to each other and North Jersey, Westchester County, Long Island, and southwestern Connecticut through bridges and tunnels. Because these highways serve millions of outer borough and suburban residents who commute into Manhattan, it is common for motorists to be stranded for hours in dense traffic congestion that is a daily occurrence, particularly during rush hour. Congestion pricing in New York City, first such program in the nation, was activated in January 2025, applying to most motor vehicular traffic using the area of Manhattan south of 60th Street, in an effort to encourage commuters to use rapid transit instead. Unlike the rest of the country, New York State prohibits turns on red lights in cities with a population greater than one million, to reduce collisions and increase pedestrian safety. In New York City, therefore, all turns on red lights are illegal unless a sign permitting such maneuvers is present.

=== Bridges and tunnels ===
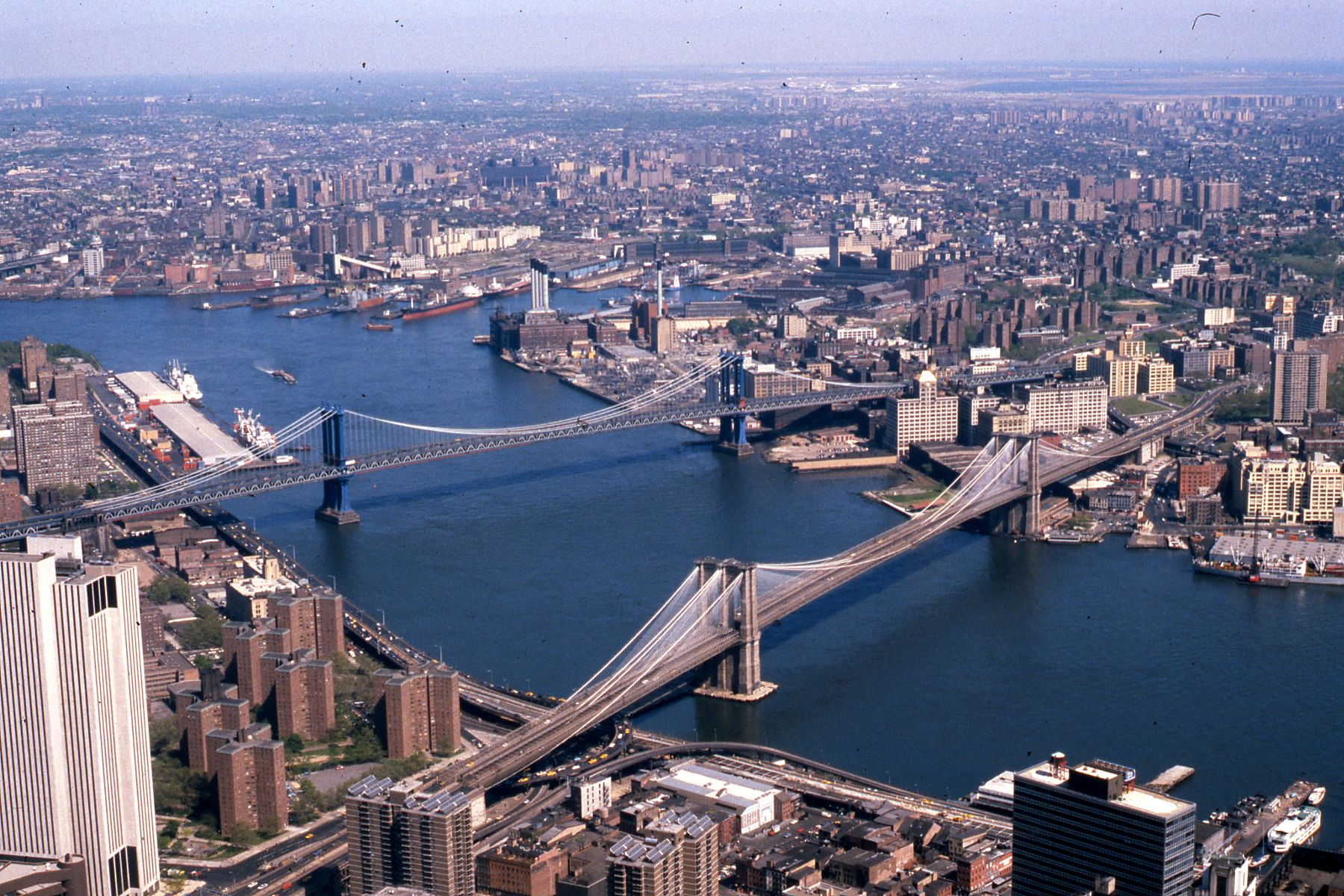
The Manhattan Bridge and Brooklyn Bridge on the East River

The boroughs of Manhattan and Staten Island are located on islands with the same names, while Queens and Brooklyn are at the western end of the larger Long Island, and the Bronx is on New York State's mainland. Manhattan Island is linked to the outer boroughs and New Jersey by an extensive network of bridges and tunnels. The 14-lane George Washington Bridge, connecting Manhattan to New Jersey across the Hudson River, is the world's busiest motor vehicle bridge. The Verrazzano–Narrows Bridge, spanning the Narrows between Brooklyn and Staten Island, is the longest suspension bridge in the Americas and one of the world's longest. The Brooklyn Bridge, with its stone neo-Gothic suspension towers, is an icon of the city; opened in 1883, it was the first steel-wire suspension bridge and was the longest suspension bridge in the world until 1903. The Queensboro Bridge "was the longest cantilever span in North America" from 1909 to 1917. The Manhattan Bridge, opened in 1909, "is considered to be the forerunner of modern suspension bridges", and its design "served as the model for the major long-span suspension bridges" of the early 20th century. The Throgs Neck Bridge and Whitestone Bridge connect Queens and the Bronx, while the Triborough Bridge connects Manhattan, Queens, and the Bronx.

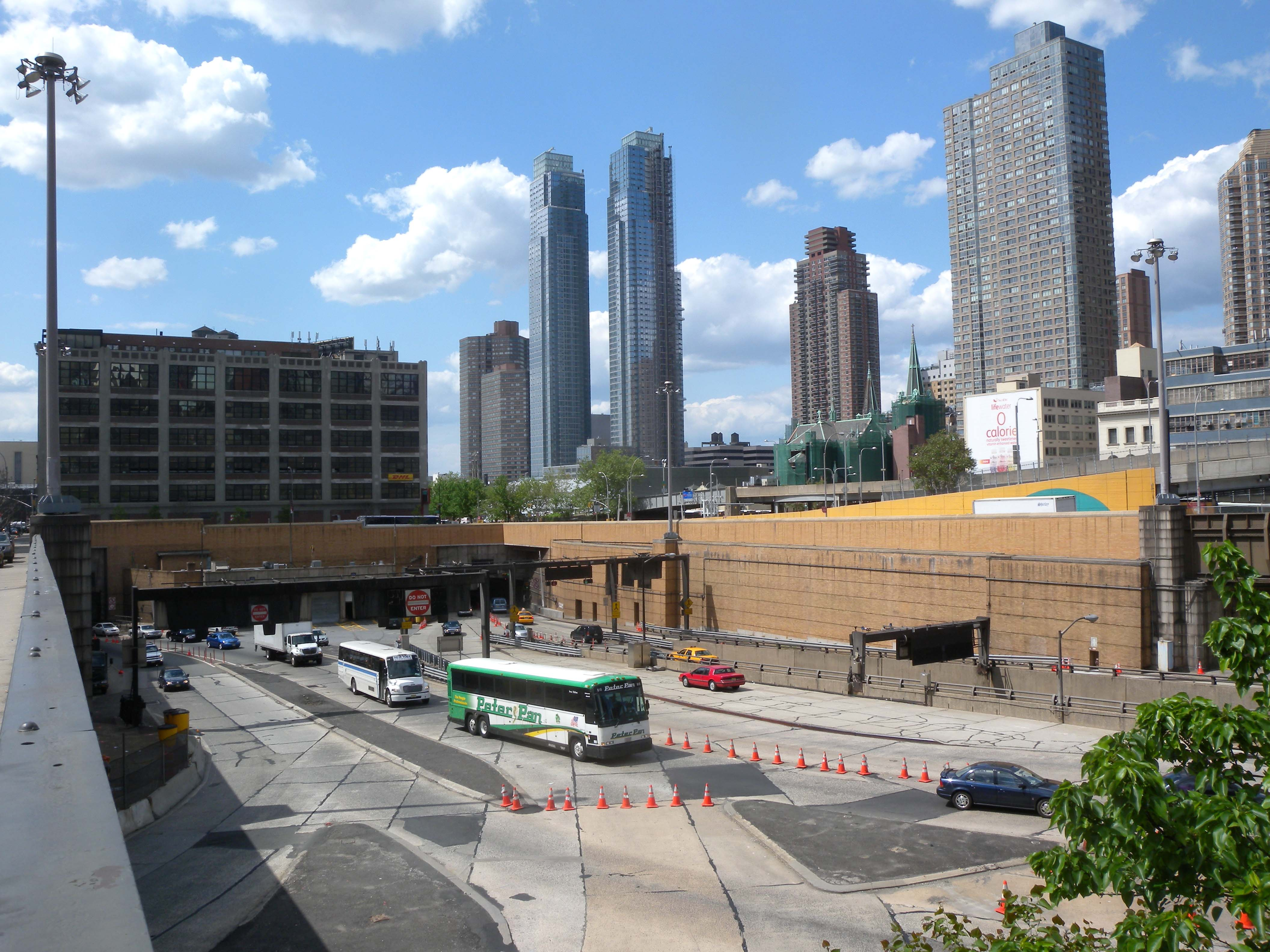
Lincoln Tunnel

The Lincoln Tunnel, which carries 120,000 vehicles a day under the Hudson River between New Jersey and Midtown Manhattan, is the busiest vehicular tunnel in the world. The tunnel was built instead of a bridge to allow unfettered passage of large passenger and cargo ships that sailed through New York Harbor and up the Hudson River to Manhattan's piers. The Holland Tunnel, connecting Lower Manhattan to Jersey City, New Jersey, was the first mechanically ventilated vehicular tunnel when it opened in 1927. The Queens–Midtown Tunnel, built to relieve congestion on the bridges connecting Manhattan with Queens and Brooklyn, was the largest non-federal project in its time when it was completed in 1940. The Brooklyn–Battery Tunnel (officially the Hugh L. Carey Tunnel) is the longest continuous underwater vehicular tunnel in North America and runs underneath Battery Park, connecting the Financial District, Manhattan, to Red Hook, Brooklyn.

== Government and politics ==
=== Government ===
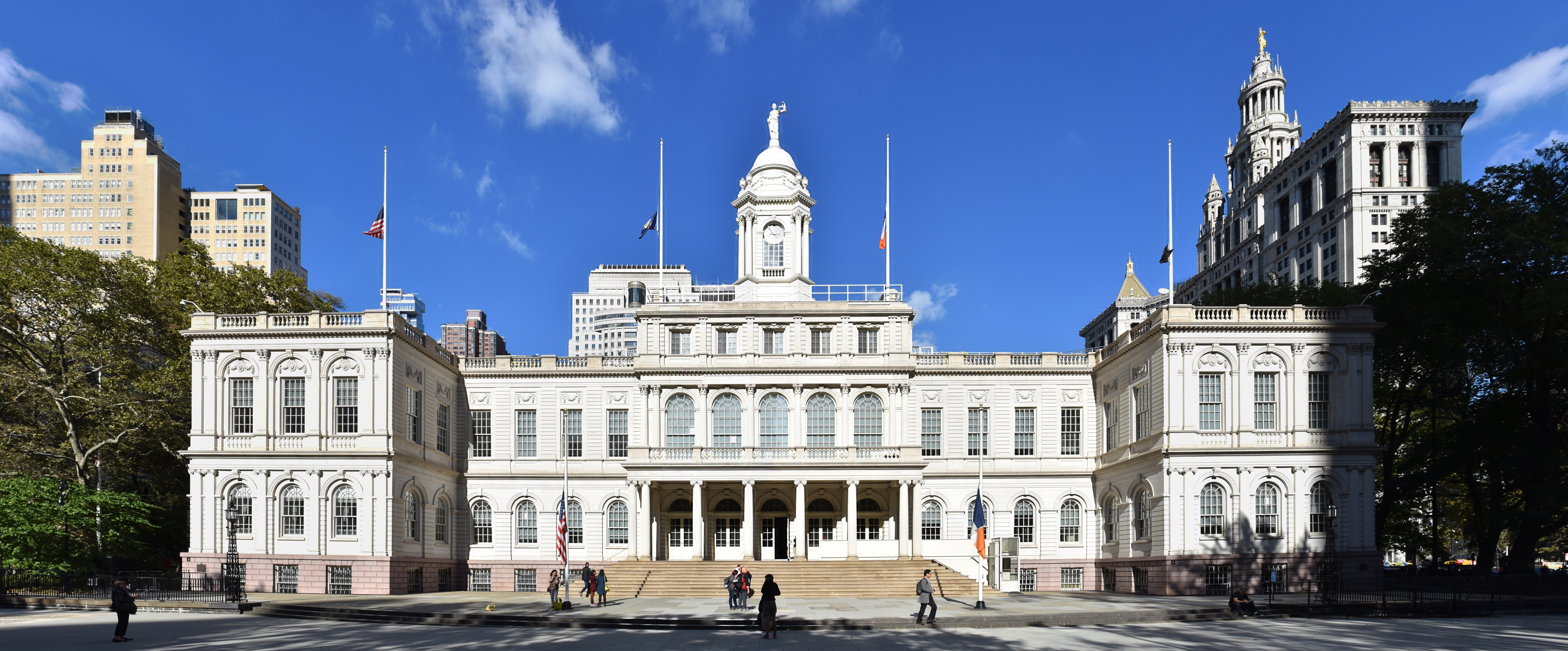
New York City Hall

New York City is a metropolitan municipality with a strong mayor–council form of government. The city government is responsible for public education, correctional institutions, public safety, recreational facilities, sanitation, water supply, and welfare services.

The City Council is a unicameral body of 51 council members whose districts are defined by geographic population boundaries. Each term for the mayor and council members lasts four years and has a two consecutive-term limit, (reset after a four-year break). The New York City Administrative Code, the New York City Rules, and The City Record are the code of local laws, compilation of regulations, and official journal, respectively.

Each borough is coextensive with a judicial district of the state Unified Court System, of which the Criminal Court and the Civil Court are the local courts, while the New York Supreme Court conducts major trials and appeals. Manhattan hosts the First Department of the Supreme Court, Appellate Division, while Brooklyn hosts the Second Department. There are several extrajudicial administrative courts, which are executive agencies and not part of the state Unified Court System.

New York City is divided between, and is host to the main branches of, two different U.S. district courts: the District Court for the Southern District of New York, whose main courthouse is on Foley Square in Manhattan and whose jurisdiction includes Manhattan and the Bronx; and the District Court for the Eastern District of New York, whose main courthouse is in Brooklyn and whose jurisdiction includes Brooklyn, Queens, and Staten Island. The U.S. Court of Appeals for the Second Circuit and U.S. Court of International Trade are also based on Foley Square.

=== Politics ===
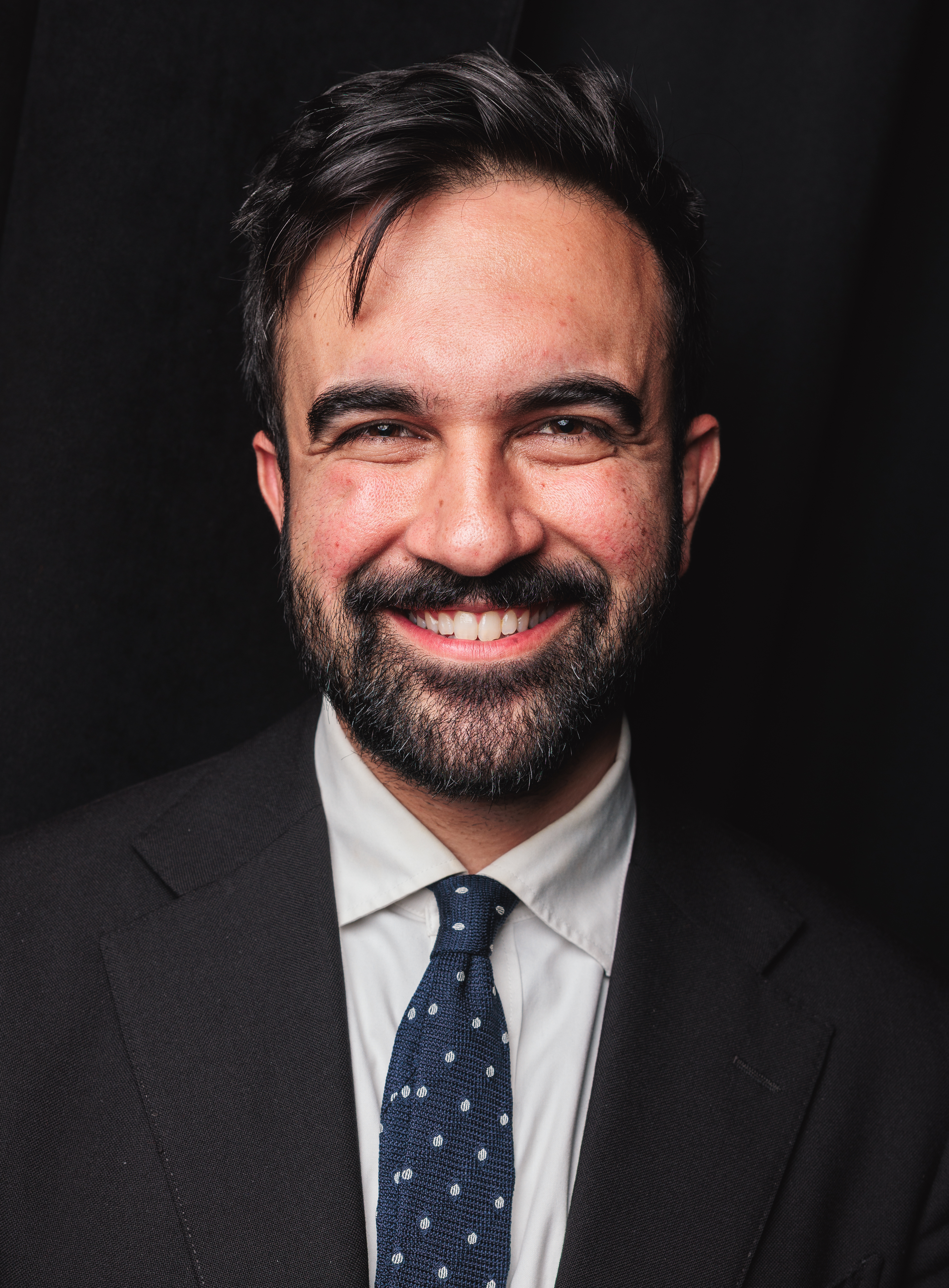
Zohran Mamdani, the current and 112th Mayor of New York City

The city's current and 112th mayor is Zohran Mamdani, a Democrat and Democratic Socialist who was elected in November 2025. Mamdani took office shortly after midnight in a private ceremony on January 1, 2026. The Democratic Party holds the majority of public offices. As of November 2023, 67% of active registered voters in the city are Democrats and 10.2% are Republicans. New York City has not been carried by a Republican presidential candidate since 1924, and no Republican candidate for statewide office has won all five boroughs since the city was incorporated in 1898. In redistricting following the 2020 census, 14 of New York's 26 congressional districts include portions of New York City.

New York City is a significant source of political fundraising. The city has a strong imbalance of payments with the national and state governments. It receives 83 cents in services for every $1 it sends to the federal government in taxes (or annually sends $11.4 billion more than it receives back). City residents and businesses also sent an additional $4.1 billion in the 2009–2010 fiscal year to the state than the city received in return.

=== International relations ===
In 2006, the sister city program was restructured as New York City Global Partners. New York's historic sister cities are denoted below by the year they joined New York City's partnership network.

New York City Global Partners network
Africa
- Accra, Ghana
- Addis Ababa, Ethiopia
- Cairo, Egypt (1982)
- Cape Town, South Africa
- Lagos, Nigeria
- Libreville, Gabon
- Johannesburg, South Africa (2003)
- Nairobi, Kenya
Asia (East)
- Beijing, China (1980)
- Changwon, South Korea
- Chongqing, China
- Guangzhou, China
- Hong Kong, China
- Seoul, South Korea
- Shanghai, China
- Shenyang, China
- Taipei, Taiwan
- Tokyo, Japan (1960)
(South)
- Bangalore, India
- Delhi, India
- Dhaka, Bangladesh
- Karachi, Pakistan
- Mumbai, India
(Southeast)
- Bangkok, Thailand
- Biên Hòa, Vietnam
- Ho Chi Minh City, Vietnam
- Jakarta, Indonesia
- Kuala Lumpur, Malaysia
- Manila, Philippines
- Singapore
(West)
- Dubai, United Arab Emirates
- Istanbul, Turkey (transcontinental)
- Jerusalem, Israel (1993)
- Tel Aviv, Israel
Australia
- Melbourne, Australia
- Sydney, Australia

Europe

(Central)
- Berlin, Germany
- Budapest, Hungary (1992)
- Düsseldorf, Germany
- Geneva, Switzerland
- Hamburg, Germany
- Heidelberg, Germany
- Munich, Germany
- Prague, Czech Republic
- Vienna, Austria
- Warsaw, Poland
(East)
- Kyiv, Ukraine
- Moscow, Russia
- St. Petersburg, Russia
(North)
- Copenhagen, Denmark
- Helsinki, Finland
- Oslo, Norway
- Stockholm, Sweden
(South)
- Barcelona, Spain
- Bucharest, Romania
- Istanbul, Turkey (transcontinental)
- Lisbon, Portugal
- Madrid, Spain (1982)
- Milan, Italy
- Pristina, Kosovo
- Rome, Italy (1992)
(West)
- Amsterdam, Netherlands
- Antwerp, Belgium
- Belfast, United Kingdom
- Brussels, Belgium
- Dublin, Ireland
- Edinburgh, United Kingdom
- Glasgow, United Kingdom
- London, United Kingdom (2001)
- Luxembourg City, Luxembourg
- Lyon, France
- Paris, France
- Rotterdam, Netherlands
- The Hague, Netherlands
North America (Canada)
- Calgary, Alberta, Canada
- Edmonton, Alberta, Canada
- Montreal, Quebec, Canada
- Ottawa, Ontario, Canada
- Quebec City, Quebec, Canada
- Toronto, Ontario, Canada
- Vancouver, British Columbia, Canada
- Victoria, British Columbia, Canada
- Winnipeg, Manitoba, Canada
(Mexico, Central America, and Caribbean)
- Cuernavaca, Morales, Mexico
- Mexico City, Mexico
- Monterrey, Nuevo León, Mexico
- Panama City, Panama
- Santo Domingo, Dominican Republic (1983)
(United States)
- Baltimore, Maryland, United States
- Boston, Massachusetts, United States
- Chicago, Illinois, United States
- Los Angeles, California, United States
- Philadelphia, Pennsylvania, United States
South America
- Bogotá, Colombia
- Brasília, Brazil (2004)
- Buenos Aires, Argentina
- Caracas, Venezuela
- Córdoba, Argentina
- Curitiba, Brazil
- Lima, Peru
- Medellín, Colombia
- Rio de Janeiro, Brazil
- Santiago, Chile
- São Paulo, Brazil

== See also ==
- Index of New York City-related articles
- Outline of New York City

== Notes ==
Preceded by Trenton, New Jersey	Capital of the United States of America; 1785–1791	Succeeded by Philadelphia, Pennsylvania
