= Art market =

Marketplace trading works of art

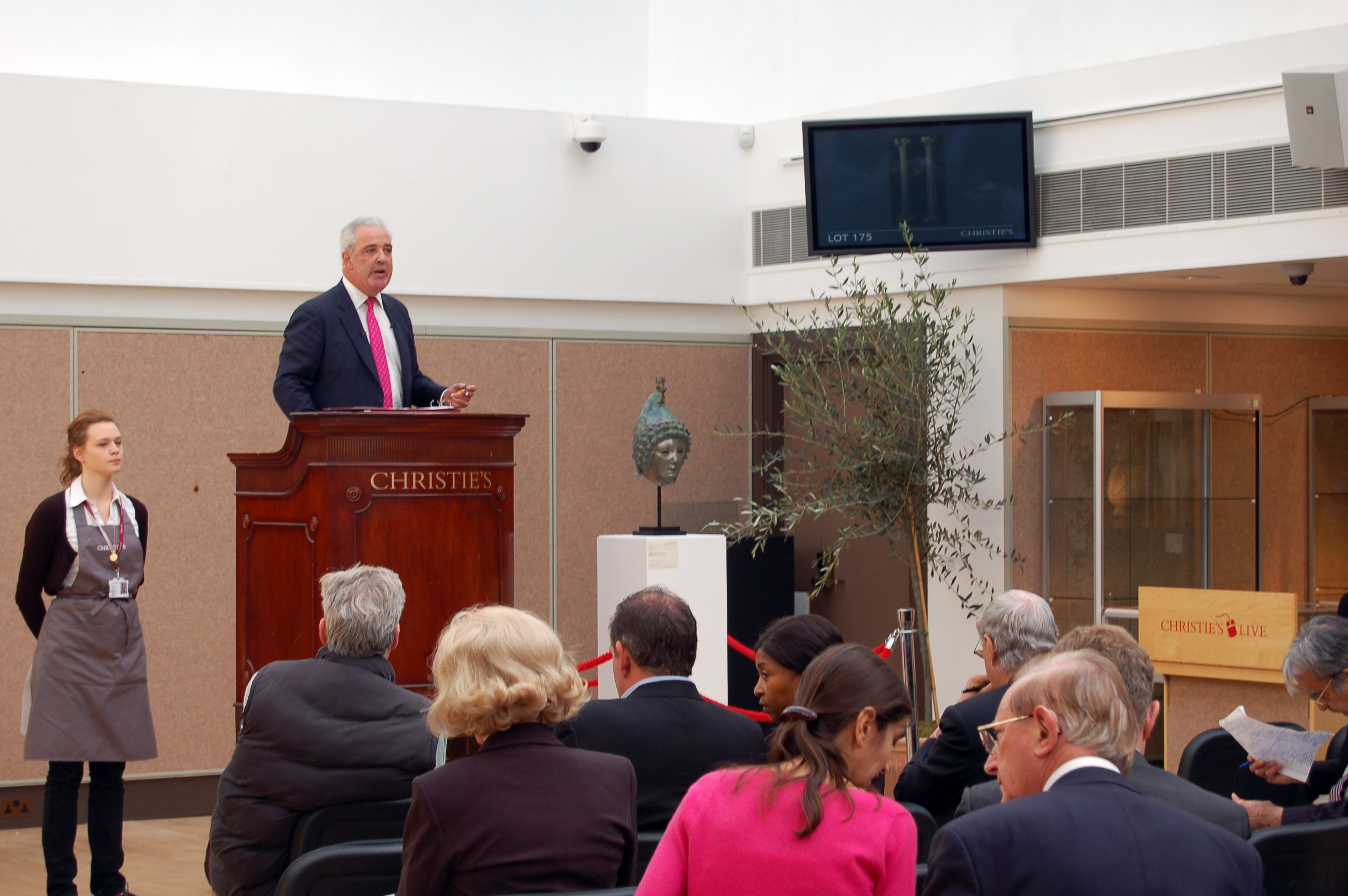
An art auction at Christie's

The art market is the marketplace of buyers and sellers trading commodities, services, and works of art.

The art market follows an economic model that considers more than supply and demand; it is a market where art is bought and sold for values based not only on a work's perceived cultural value, but on its past monetary value as well as its predicted future value. The market has been described as one where producers do not create work primarily for sale. Buyers often have no clear understanding of the value of what they buy, and middlemen routinely receive compensation for sales of items they have never seen, to buyers they have never interacted with. Moreover, the market is not transparent; private sales data are not systematically available, and private sales represent about half of market transactions. In 2018, Robert Norton, CEO and co-founder of Verisart, noted that "Art is the second-largest unregulated market after illicit drugs and it's significantly overshadowed by fraudulent activity."

== Economics ==
Unlike the volumes in some international markets in the financial field where millions of people and firms participate in buying and selling financial interests, or economic and consumer goods markets where products are usually exchanged using more standardized contracts, art market activity largely follows the demands of a more limited array of private collectors, museums, and large corporate interests as the principal market participants. The art market sees itself as a microcosm: it lists its collectors in the hundreds, as opposed to the securities market which has millions of participants. One art writer answered the question: "Do you see the art world as a microcosm of other broader, power communities?" with the following observation: "I'm not sure if it's a microcosm or the shape of things to come. Its manic internationalism." Corporate collectors, however, can have a disparately large market impact, for instance, Spear's reported in 2015 that British Rail began investing in art for its pension fund beginning in 1974 (prior to privatization), spending about £40M or approximately 3% of its funds on art, before selling those assets between 1987–1999. British Rail Pension realized an annualized return of 11.3% due to several market-specific factors particular at the time. British Rail's efforts realized profits, particularly due to the Impressionist portfolio, but the collection was liquidated because it came to be seen as an illegitimate investment area, particularly as alternative investments became available. Additionally, because original artworks are not fungible, they have valuation challenges not similarly affecting securities, with dynamics of what Karpik calls singularities.

Thus, because the art market's participants are far more limited in number than the securities or commodities markets, because artworks are not fungible, and because art valuation relies to a great extent on the advice and enthusiasm of a variety of specialized market analysts, these limitations each in turn dictate the size of the market and increase the risk that some items may be over or undervalued.

The art market moves in cycles with activity generally peaking in the spring and autumn when the major auction houses traditionally schedule auctions, and results in the market being seasonal rather than ongoing. While private sales take place all year, those sales are often not publicized as auctions are and thus do not affect the market until they become known.

Art valuations made for an autumn auction may be unrealistic for the following spring auction season because fortunes in the financial markets during one season can affect the art market in the following season, and equity markets do significantly impact the art market. Volatility in the financial markets often causes volatility in the art market as happened in the contraction of the art market during the Great Recession when sales at Sotheby's, Christie's, and Phillips de Pury & Company were less than half the previous year: November 2008, $803.3 million compared to November 2007, $1.75 billion; and between 2000 and 2003 when the annual volume of art works sold at auction dropped 36%. In other instances, the art market can fare reasonably well despite volatility in the stock market such as happened from January 1997 through May 2004 when the average quarterly fluctuation in the Artprice Global Index was two to three times smaller than the same statistic for the Dow Jones Industrial Average and the S&P 500.

As art market participants' fortunes wax and wane in the financial markets, buying power evolves and affects participants' ability to afford highly valued works, resulting in new buyers and sellers entering, leaving, or re-entering the market, and an artwork sold to offset losses in the financial market might be sold for substantially more or substantially less than its last hammer price at auction. In the late 1980s during the stock-market boom, the art market expanded in turn with prices soaring to new heights, and investment firms took a greater interest in the art market and began to study it in-depth. Concurrently, the previously non-transparent art market became more accessible via the increasing availability of indices and online data, although researchers discovered biased price estimates in the auction houses.

Art sometimes has transient fashionability that also can affect its value: what sells well for a time may be supplanted in the market by new styles and ideas in short order. For instance, in the spring of 2008 a collector offered over $80 million for Jeff Koons' stainless-steel Rabbit, and yet a year later, of four works in the fall auctions at Christie's and Sotheby's in New York, only two of his pieces sold well and one failed to sell entirely. In 2011, Christie's sold Koons' Balloon Flower sculpture for $16.9 million.

In 2025, Gen Z art collectors spent an average of $347,000 on fine art, compared with $79,000 for Generation X collectors.

== Primary and secondary markets ==
The art market as a whole is affected by its two main parts: the primary art market, where new art comes to the market for the first time, and the secondary market, for existing art that has been sold at least once before. Once a work is sold on the primary market it enters the secondary market, and the prices for which it sold in the primary market have a direct bearing on the work's value in the secondary market. Supply and demand affect the secondary market more than the primary market because works new to the market, mainly contemporary art, have no market history for predictive analysis and thus valuation of such work is more difficult, and more speculative. Gallery, dealer, consultant, and agent promotion as well as collectors acting as alpha consumers (trend-setters) are the forces at work in valuing primary market works.

=== Market entry barriers ===
As with blue-chip stocks, works by "blue-chip" or well-known artists are generally valued more highly than works by unknown artists since it is hard to predict how an unknown artist's work will sell, or whether it will sell at all. High barriers to entry for artists create scarcity in the supply and demand of the market, in turn driving up prices and raising questions of efficiency in the art market transactions. While a high market entry barrier may result in having a smaller pool of artwork producers in the auction-level portion of the market, and in greater market predictability by virtue of that smaller pool and thus more reliable valuation measures, its axiomatic effect is of lesser artistic diversity negatively impacting the size of the buyer pool. For this reason, gallerists and art dealers consider what types of works are currently in vogue before deciding to represent a new artist and are highly selective in those choices in order to maintain a level of quality that is saleable. All these concerns are in play when gallerists set prices for emerging artists at a much lower level than for established artists.

This selectivity may also be practiced on the buy side, in terms of gallerists being selective about which buyers to sell to. As another form of gatekeeping, this is done primarily to protect price points from the potential dangers of speculation, or what Velthuis calls "control of the biography" of the artwork.

=== Market transparency ===
In 2009, a debate occurred between valuation-setting members of the art market on the proposition that "the art market is less ethical than the stock market". The art market faced criticism for its lack of transparency, its Byzantine valuation methods, and a perceived lack of ethical behavior enabled by structural inadequacies in the market itself. At the end of the debate, the audience determined that those debating in agreement with the proposition won the debate. Of particular note in the debate was the identification of "chandelier bidding" as a practice perceived as ethically questionable. The debaters described "chandelier bidding" as bids from the chandelier, or bids from an unknown source, meaning both the bidding by the auction houses on behalf of the sellers whose items the houses are auctioning (a conflict of interest), and bidding by unidentified bidders having no intention of buying but bidding in order to drive prices up, all practiced because the auction houses keep secret from bidders a seller's reserve price.

In 2011, also in response to criticism on the lack of market transparency and counterarguments that more transparency would ruin the market, The Art Newspaper in association with the Art Dealers Association of America convened an Art Industry Summit panel discussion between major art market decision makers, where panelists discussed whether there was a need for more transparency. The panelists argued over whether auction houses have built-in conflicts of interest by representing sellers with secret reserves, while at the same time representing to buyers initial valuations on those works at auction time. The debate also included the issue of first and third-party guaranteed bids, and whether sellers' reserve prices should be disclosed so that participants no longer bid on an object they have no chance of buying. In response to criticisms regarding chandelier bidding and unidentified third-party guaranteed bids, Christie's International chairman Edward Dolman countered that, without a secret reserve, illegal cartels of bidders would know in advance information that could facilitate their manipulation of the market and corruption of final valuation by selling price at auction.

With the art market's weaknesses (especially lack of transparency and conflicts of interests) becoming better known, serious external conversations about market regulation have begun among major market players; for example, the Financial Times noted that in early 2015, participants at the January World Economic Forum meeting attended a lunch seminar where the speaker warned that the global art market needs to be regulated because of systemic weaknesses which enable inside information trading, tax evasion, and money laundering. The emergence of advanced technologies and data-driven analysis introduces new participants in the field of art market transparency.

In terms of academic research, there is work on the opacity of price formation in finance and economics, while critical accounting work highlights the extreme difficulties in calculating the current value of an artwork using the auction sales prices of comparable artworks.

== Auction house market structure ==
The late 1980s were a boom period for art auction houses. However, in early 1990, the market collapsed. The US overtook the EU as the world's largest art market with a global share of 47 per cent by 2001. Ranking second, the UK's world market share hovers around 25 per cent. In continental Europe, France was the market leader while in Asia, Hong Kong continues its dominance. France's share of the art market has been progressively eroded since the 1950s, when it was the dominant location and sales at Drouot surpassed those of Sotheby's and Christie's combined. In 2004, the global fine art market turnover was estimated at almost billion. Art auction sales reached a record billion in 2007, fueled by speculative bidding for artists such as Damien Hirst, Jeff Koons, and Richard Prince. The recent rise of the Chinese art market, both in terms of the size of its domestic sales and the international significance of its buyers, has, combined with a rich cultural heritage of art and antiques, produced a huge domestic market and ended the duopoly held by London and New York for over 50 years.

=== Competitors ===
Christie's and Sotheby's are the leading auction venues. In 2002, LVMH acquired Swiss art advisory firm de Pury & Luxembourg and merged it with Phillips to form Phillips de Pury & Company, with the aim of breaking the duopoly at the top of the market.

=== Segments ===
Fine art auctions are generally held separately for Impressionist and Modern art as well as for Post-war and Contemporary Art. Pablo Picasso's works remain highly coveted. In 2008 Damien Hirst set a world record for auction sales by a living artist; however in 2009, Hirst's annual auction sales had shrunk by 93%.

=== Estimates ===
"Estimates" often reflect the consignor's ambitions as much as the auction specialist's considered opinion. They do not reflect commissions. To secure consignments, auction houses concede high estimates to suit the requirements of art owners. Before an auction, interested buyers typically turn for advice to the auction house specialist who quotes the estimate and often recommends going beyond in order to secure the item.

=== Commissions and buyer's premium ===
Auction houses operate contractually on behalf of sellers of goods, charging sellers a fixed commission (fee) amounting to a percentage of the "hammer price" for which a lot is sold. Christie's published its commissions in September 1995, with its fees ranging from 20% on the least expensive lots to 2% on lots sold for over m; Sotheby's followed suit. For Phillips de Pury & Company, final prices include commission of 25% of the first 20% of the next to million, and 12% of the rest, with estimates not reflecting commissions. Objects sold are also subject to a further fee called the "buyer's premium", 15% being typical, with the term implying that by virtue of selling an object, the auction house performs a service for the buyer subject to remuneration. Thus, both the seller and the buyer of an object or lot sold by the major auction houses pay a fee. First implemented in 1975 by Christie's, the assessment of a buyer's premium is one of several auction-house practices to which art dealers object.

=== Performance-based fees ===
Beginning in 2014, Christie's charged 2 percent of the hammer price of a work that meets or exceeds its high estimate. The fee does not apply to online only sales.

=== Guarantees ===
An auction house may offer a guaranteed selling price, or "guaranteed minimum", a practice designed to give sellers confidence to consign works and to give potential bidders reassurance that there are others willing to buy an item. Auction houses have offered guarantees since the early 1970s to encourage collectors to sell their artworks: The Art Newspaper reported that guarantees were first introduced in 1971 at Sotheby's, when 47 Kandinskys and other works from the Guggenheim Museum were offered with a guaranteed minimum; similar arrangements followed in 1972 and 1973 for the Ritter and Scull collections. A guaranteed amount is generally close to the lower estimate, with the seller and the auction house sharing any amount exceeding the guaranteed minimum. In autumn 2008 when the market turned sour, Christie's and Sotheby's had to pay out at least million on works for which they guaranteed a minimum price but which failed to sell. In order to reduce their exposure to such losses, boost the market, and reduce volatility, the main auction houses now prefer that third parties take on this financial risk via "third-party guarantees" or "irrevocable bids": using this practice the auction houses sell a work to a third party for a minimum price prior to the auction and this selling price then becomes the "reserve" below which the artwork will not be sold. If bidding for specified works stops at the minimum price, which remains undisclosed, the "third party" acquires the lot; if bidding exceeds the reserve, the third party splits any profit from its sale with the consignor and with the auction house, the percentage going to each party varying with the deal. These proportions, never disclosed to the public, are negotiated before an auction and specified in the contract signed by the auction house and the third party.

=== Online sales ===
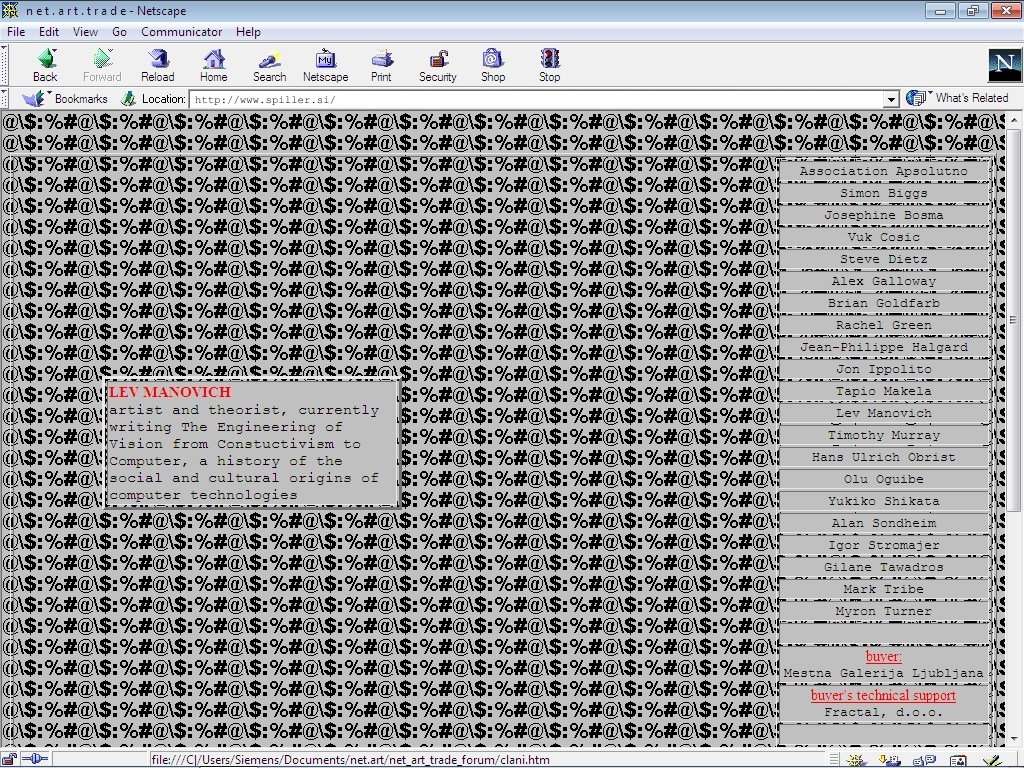
A Screenshot of Teo Spiller's net.art net.art.trade

In May 1999, Teo Spiller sold a web art project Megatronix to Ljubljana Municipal Museum, which was announced by the New York Times as the first sale of an Internet art net.art. In 2003, Sotheby's abandoned its partnership with eBay after it lost millions through its various attempts to sell fine art over the internet. As of 2018 it was noted that online sales accounted for about 8% ($5.4 billion) of the global art market.

== Black market ==
In addition to upstanding practices, a black market exists for great art, which is closely tied to art theft and art forgery. No auction houses or dealers admit openly to participating in the black market because of its illegality, but exposés suggest widespread problems in the field. Because demand for art objects is high, and security in many parts of the world is low, a thriving trade in illicit antiquities acquired through looting also exists. Although the art community nearly universally condemns looting because it results in destruction of archeological sites, looted art paradoxically remains omnipresent. Warfare is correlated with such looting, as is demonstrated by the recent archaeological looting in Iraq.

== See also ==
- Appraiser
- Art valuation
- Art finance
- Blockage discount
- Guide Mayer
- International trade in fine art
- Valuation
- Sociology of valuation
- Gerald Reitlinger
