= Spiller (surname) =

Spiller is a German surname meaning player of a musical instrument. It may refer to:

- Bill Spiller, American golfer
- Bill W. Spiller, American broadcaster
- Billy Spiller, English cricket and rugby player
- C. J. Spiller, American football player
- Carlton T. Spiller, American poet
- Cecil Spiller, Welsh cricketer
- Charlie Spiller, American football player
- Cristiano Spiller or Spiller, Italian DJ
- Danny Spiller, English football player
- Frederick Spiller, English boxer
- Gustav Spiller, Hungarian-English writer
- Henry Spiller, English politician
- Isaiah Spiller, American football player
- Letícia Spiller, Brazilian actress
- Ljerko Spiller, Croatian violinist
- Mary Spiller, English horticulturist
- Michael Spiller, American director
- Neil Spiller, English architect
- Matthew Spiller, Canadian hockey player
- Richard Georg Spiller von Hauenschild or Max Waldau, Polish writer
- Robert Spiller, English politician
- Teo Spiller, Slovenian artist

== Fictional ==
- Lucy Spiller, a character from the American TV series Dirt
- Patrick Spiller, a character from the British TV series Casualty

== See also ==
- Spiller, Ohio, an unincorporated community in the United States
- Spiller, the German name of the Polish village Pasiecznik, Lower Silesian Voivodeship
- Spillers (disambiguation)
