= Historical Dictionaries series =

Series of historical encyclopedias

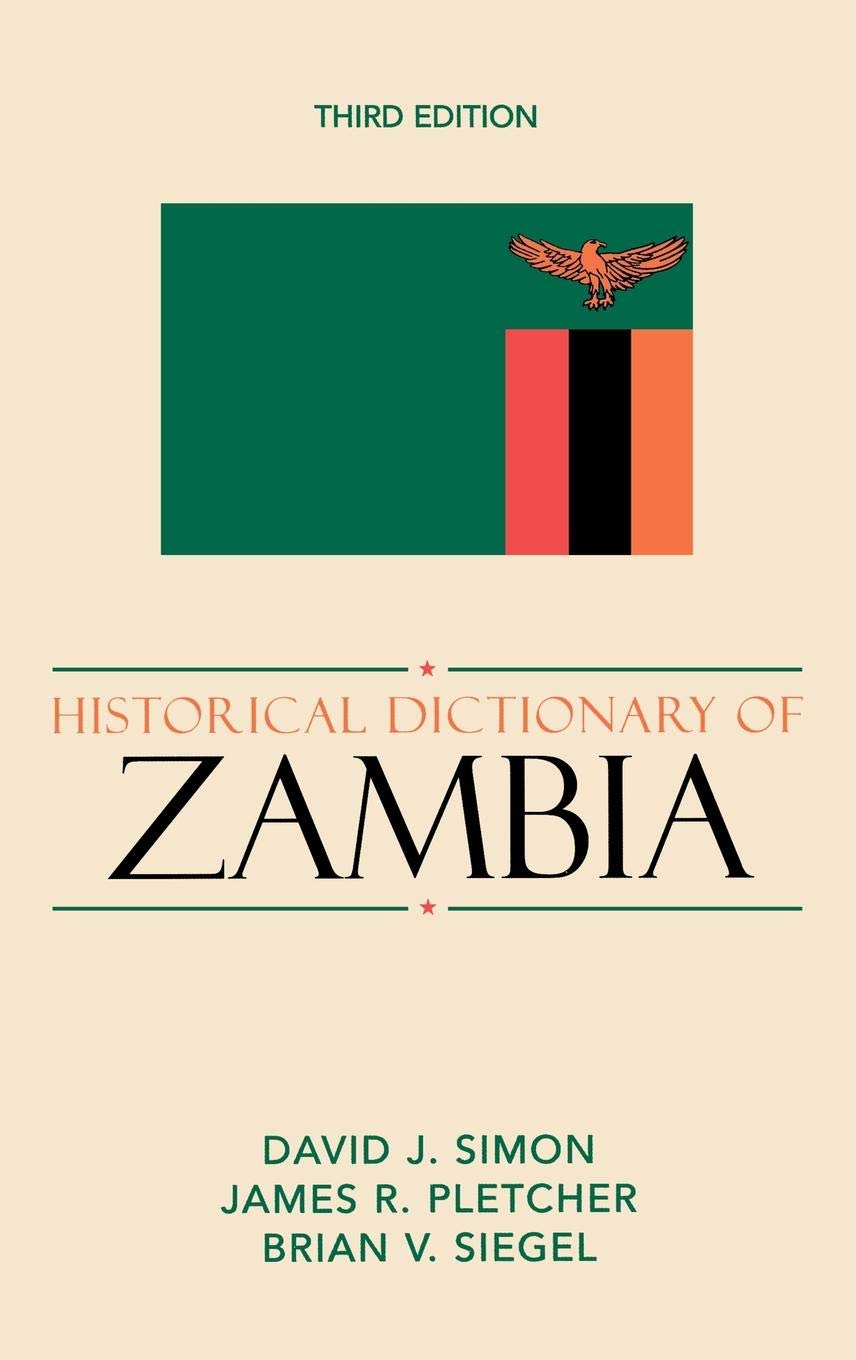
- Historical Dictionary of Zambia, 3rd edition, Scarecrow Press, 2007.
- Founded: 1967
- Founder: Ralph R. Shaw
- Country of origin: United States
- Owner: Rowman & Littlefield
- Official website: https://www.bloomsbury.com/us/discover/bloomsbury-academic/rowman-littlefield/

The Historical Dictionaries are a series of historical encyclopedias published by Rowman & Littlefield that runs to hundreds of volumes. The first volumes in the series were published by Scarecrow Press from 1967 and were organised by country and continent, but the series has since expanded into a wide range of cultural and political topics. The encyclopedias are arranged using a common structure and most have a single author. They seek to provide the historical context for current events.

== Background ==
Scarecrow Press was founded by Ralph R. Shaw in 1950 to show that scholarly books could be published on a tight budget. One of its editors described it as a "bare-bones, quick-turnaround publisher which produced books for librarians and scholars. There were no book jackets, the covers were fairly ordinary, and the typesetting was not justified."

== History ==
The first books in the Historical Dictionary series were Latin American country volumes published in 1967. African and Asian countries followed in the 1970s, and lastly, European and Oceanic countries. Later the series expanded into areas such as culture, religion, and political philosophy. There is a complementary series of Area Bibliographies.

Most of the encyclopedias have a single author, a practice described as "highly unusual" in compilation of reference works, and Jon Woronoff, editor of the Asian series, has described the difficulty of finding suitable authors for some of the smaller countries, which meant that the African series, for instance, took 25 years to complete. Once published, however, the volumes on the difficult countries potentially had more impact than those for which similar works already existed.

The Scarecrow Press imprint was subsequently owned by Grolier and is now owned by Rowman & Littlefield. Selected volumes in the series are available in paperback as "A to Z Guides".

== Content ==
The encyclopedias tend to follow a uniform format of a chronology, introduction, the historical dictionary, and a bibliography with supplementary material such as maps, abbreviations, place name changes, or notes on language according to the subject. The main section is the historical encyclopedia which covers events, people and places, and additional topics appropriate to the subject. The bibliographies are organised by subject and may range from 50 to 100 pages. Jon Woronoff has described the philosophy of the series as being to focus on current events with the historical content in the books limited to that necessary to understand those events. Other historical material is relegated to separate volumes on ancient history.

== Criticism ==
In his 1980 review article of the African volumes, David C. Tambo noted that the Historical Dictionaries had been subject to an unusually high level of criticism for a reference series. While librarians had lauded the works for filling a long-standing gap in the scholarly literature, academics complained about poor editorial choices, uneven quality, and a lack of factual accuracy. These failings were described as particularly regrettable where the volume covered a niche area for which a competing volume might never be produced. Tambo attributed the unevenness in quality to the practice of the publishers of using a single author for each volume, who often was not an historian, possibly in an attempt to save money. He concluded that although there was a need to collate this sort of material in one place, the African volumes reviewed had not met that need.

== Subjects ==
As of June 2019, encyclopedias are published on the following subjects:

- Africa
- The Americas
- Ancient Civilizations and Historical Eras
- Asia, Oceania, and the Middle East
- Cities, States, and Regions
- Diplomacy and Foreign Relations
- Discovery and Exploration
- Europe
- Intelligence and Counter-Intelligence
- International Organizations
- Literature and the Arts
- Peoples and Cultures
- Professions and Industries
- Religions, Philosophies, and Movements Series
- Sports
- U.S. Politics and Political Eras
- War, Revolution, and Civil Unrest
- Women in the World

== See also ==
- List of Scarecrow Press historical dictionaries
