= Alcorn State University =

Historically Black public college in Lorman, Mississippi, US

- Former names: Alcorn University (1871–1878); Alcorn Agricultural and Mechanical College (1878–1974)
- Motto: "Service, Scholarship, Dignity" "Where Knowledge and Character Matter"
- Type: Public historically black land-grant research university
- Established: May 13, 1871; 155 years ago
- Parent institution: Mississippi Institutions of Higher Learning
- Accreditation: SACS
- Academic affiliations: TMCF; Space-grant
- Endowment: $21.3 million (2021)
- President: Tracy M. Cook
- Students: 2,933 (fall 2022)
- Undergraduates: 2,431 (fall 2022)
- Postgraduates: 502 (fall 2019)
- Location: Alcorn State, Mississippi, United States; 31.8769°N 91.1411°W
- Campus: Remote rural, 1,756 acres (7.11 km^{2})
- Other campuses: Natchez; Vicksburg
- Newspaper: The Campus Chronicle
- Colors: Purple and gold
- Nickname: Braves and Lady Braves
- Sporting affiliations: NCAA Division I FCS – SWAC
- Mascot: Bravehawk
- Website: www.alcorn.edu

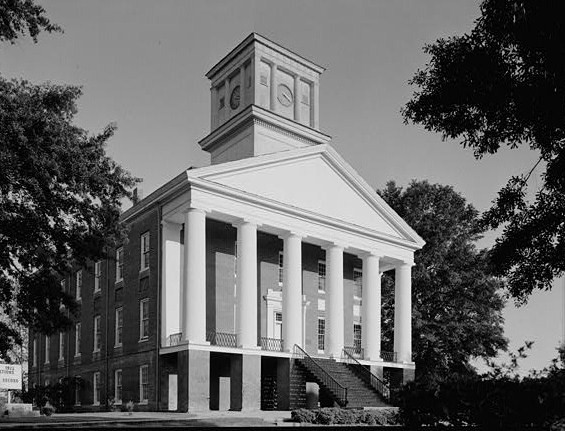
Oakland Chapel on the campus of Alcorn State University

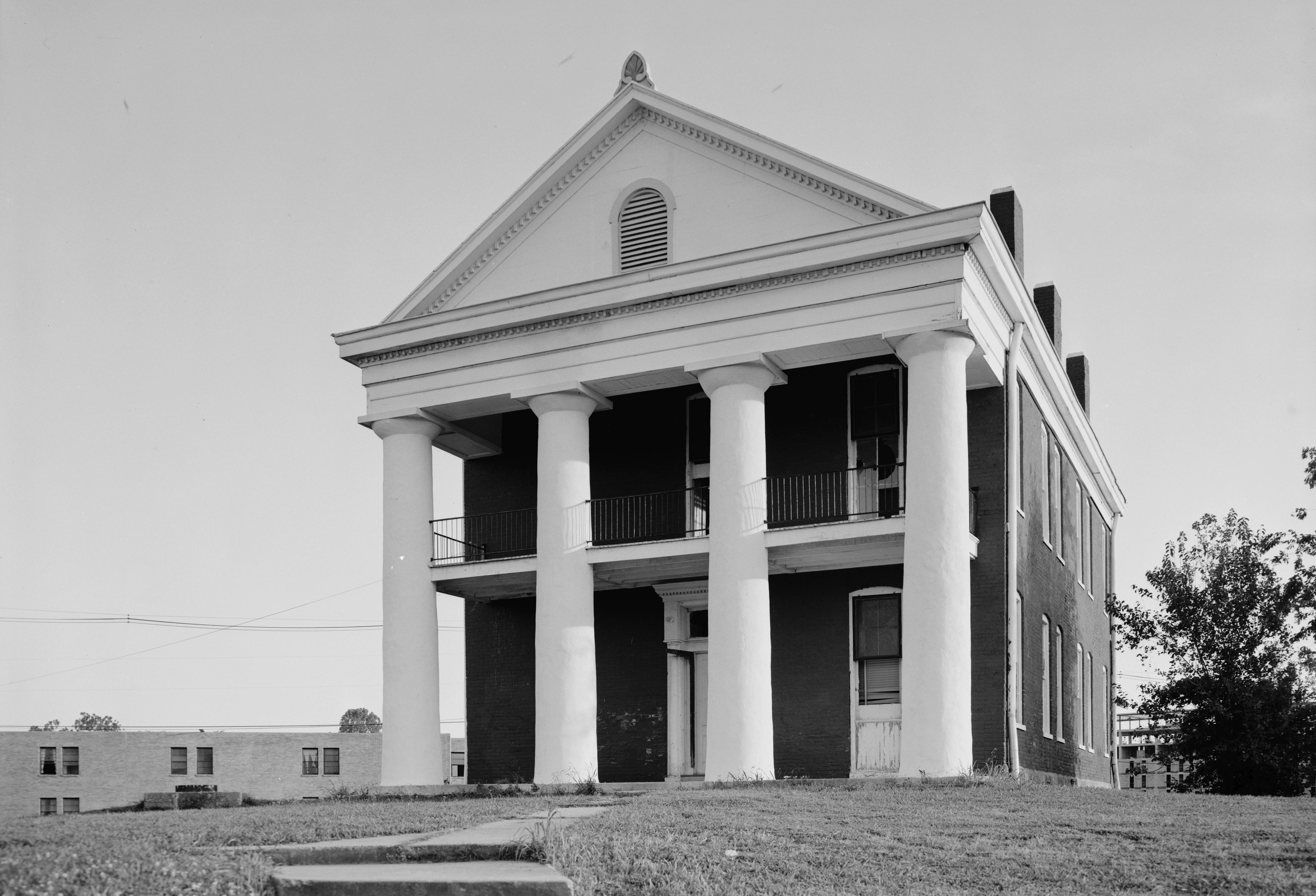
The Literary Society Building on the campus of Alcorn State University

Alcorn State University (Alcorn State, ASU or Alcorn) is a public historically black land-grant research university adjacent to Lorman, Mississippi. Named after former Mississippi governor James L. Alcorn, it was founded in 1871 and was the first black land grant college established in the United States. The university is a member-school of the Thurgood Marshall College Fund.

Alcorn State's athletic teams are known as the Braves and compete in NCAA Division I. All teams compete as members of the Southwestern Athletic Conference (SWAC).

== History ==
Alcorn State University was the first black land grant college in the country. Mississippi's Reconstructionist legislature, dominated by Republicans sympathetic to the cause of educating the formerly enslaved, established the college on the site of Oakland College, a college that had gone defunct due to the Civil War. Alcorn University started with what is recognized as three historic buildings.

United States Senator Hiram R. Revels resigned his seat when he accepted the position as Alcorn's first president. The state legislature provided $50,000 in cash for ten successive years for the establishment and overall operations of the college. The state also granted Alcorn three-fifths of the proceeds from the sale of 30,000 acres (12,000 ha) of land scrip for agricultural or land-grant colleges under federal legislation. The land was sold for $188,928, with Alcorn receiving $113,400. This money was to be used solely to support the college's agricultural and mechanical components, which Congress wanted to develop nationally. From its beginning, Alcorn State University was a land-grant college. After a group of white Democrats known as Redeemers took over the legislature, Alcorn's appropriation was slashed by almost 90 percent, to $5,500 per year, and an all-white board of trustees was appointed.

In 1878, the name Alcorn University was changed to Alcorn Agricultural and Mechanical College. The university's original 225 acres (0.91 km^{2}) of land have been expanded to develop a 1,700 acres (6.9 km^{2}) campus. The goals for the college set by the Mississippi legislature following the Reconstruction era emphasized training for blacks rather than academic education. The school, like other black schools during these years, was less a college than a vocational school intended to prepare students for the agricultural economy of the state and of most of their hometowns.

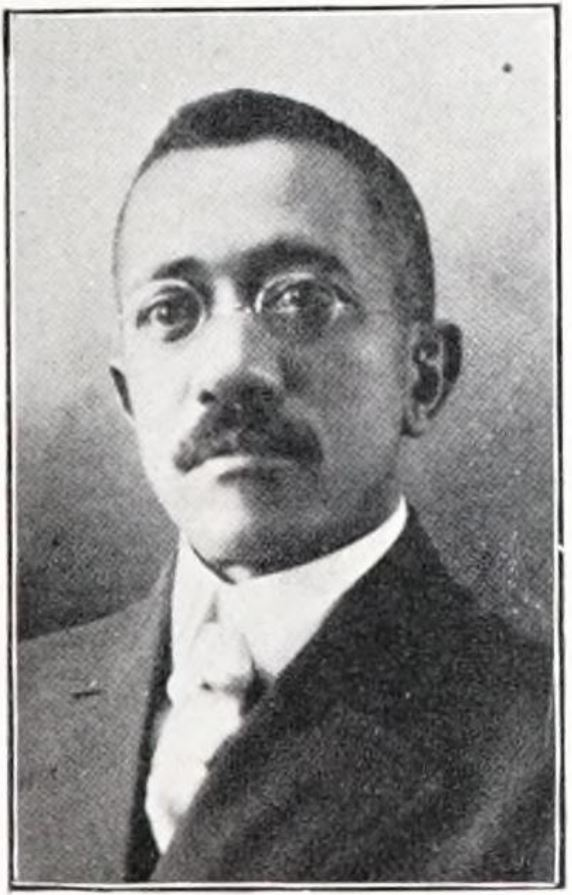
Levi J. Rowan

At first, the school was exclusively for black males, but women were admitted in 1895. Alcorn began with eight faculty members in 1871. Today, the faculty and staff number more than 500. The student body has grown from 179 mostly local male students to more than 2,933 students from all over the world.

In 1974, Alcorn Agricultural and Mechanical College was renamed Alcorn State University, representing the development of its programs. Governor William L. Waller signed House Bill 298, granting university status to Alcorn and the other state-supported colleges. Alcorn had already become a more diversified university, with graduate programs. It provides an undergraduate education that enables students to continue their studies in graduate and professional schools, pursue teaching, and enter other professions. It also provides graduate education to equip students for further training in specialized fields.

In 1994, Jay Searcy of the Philadelphia Inquirer said that except for its football team, Evers, and "an occasional Olympic athlete," "Alcorn rarely gets mentioned outside the state of Mississippi" although attention on the university increased after Steve McNair's athletic successes.

In 2020, MacKenzie Scott donated $25 million to Alcorn State. Her 2020 donation is the second-largest gift in Alcorn's history. Five years later, she donated an additional $42 million to Alcorn, which is the largest gift in its history.

=== Presidents ===
Name	Years	Interim
Hiram Rhodes Revels	1871–1882	No
John Houston Burrus	1882–1893	No
Wilson H. Reynolds	1893–1894	No
Thomas J. Calloway	1894–1896	No
Edward H. Triplett	1896–1899	No
William H. Lanier	1899–1905	No
Levi John Rowan	1905–1911	No
John Adams Martin	1911–1915	No
Levi John Rowan	1915–1934	No
Isiah S. Sanders, acting president	1934–1934	No
William Harrison Bell	1934–1944	No
Preston Sewell Bowles	1944–1945	No
William Harrison Pipes	1945–1949	No
Jesse R. Otis	1949–1957	No
John Dewey Boyd	1957–1969	No
Walter Washington	1969–1994	No
Rudolph E. Waters Sr.	1994–1995	Yes
Clinton Bristow Jr.	1995–2006	No
Malvin A. Williams Sr.	2006–2008	Yes
George E. Ross	2008–2010	No
Norris Allen Edney	2010–2011	Yes
M. Christopher Brown II	2011–2013	No
Norris Edney	2013–2014	Yes
Alfred Rankins, Jr.	2014–2018	No
Donzell Lee	2018–2019	Yes
Felecia M. Nave	2019–2023	No
Ontario Wooden	2023	Yes
Tracy M. Cook	2023–	No (Note: Interim 2023–2024, then permanent 2024–)

== Academics ==
Alcorn State is the second-largest historically black college or university (HBCU) and the fifth-largest university in Mississippi, with an enrollment of approximately 3,700 undergraduate students and 600 graduate students. The university has seven schools, offering more than 50 different fields of study.

- College of Agriculture and Applied Sciences
- College of Arts and Sciences
- School of Business
- School of Education and Psychology
- School of Nursing

Alcorn State University consistently ranks among the top 25 HBCUs in the nation according to the annual U.S. News & World Report HBCU rankings.

Alcorn State University is the only HBCU in Mississippi with a comprehensive nursing program, and the first institution in Mississippi and at an HBCU nationwide offering a STEM MBA.

The Myrlie Evers-Williams Honors Program is available to highly motivated undergraduate students seeking to enhance their academic experience and leadership skills.

== Locations ==
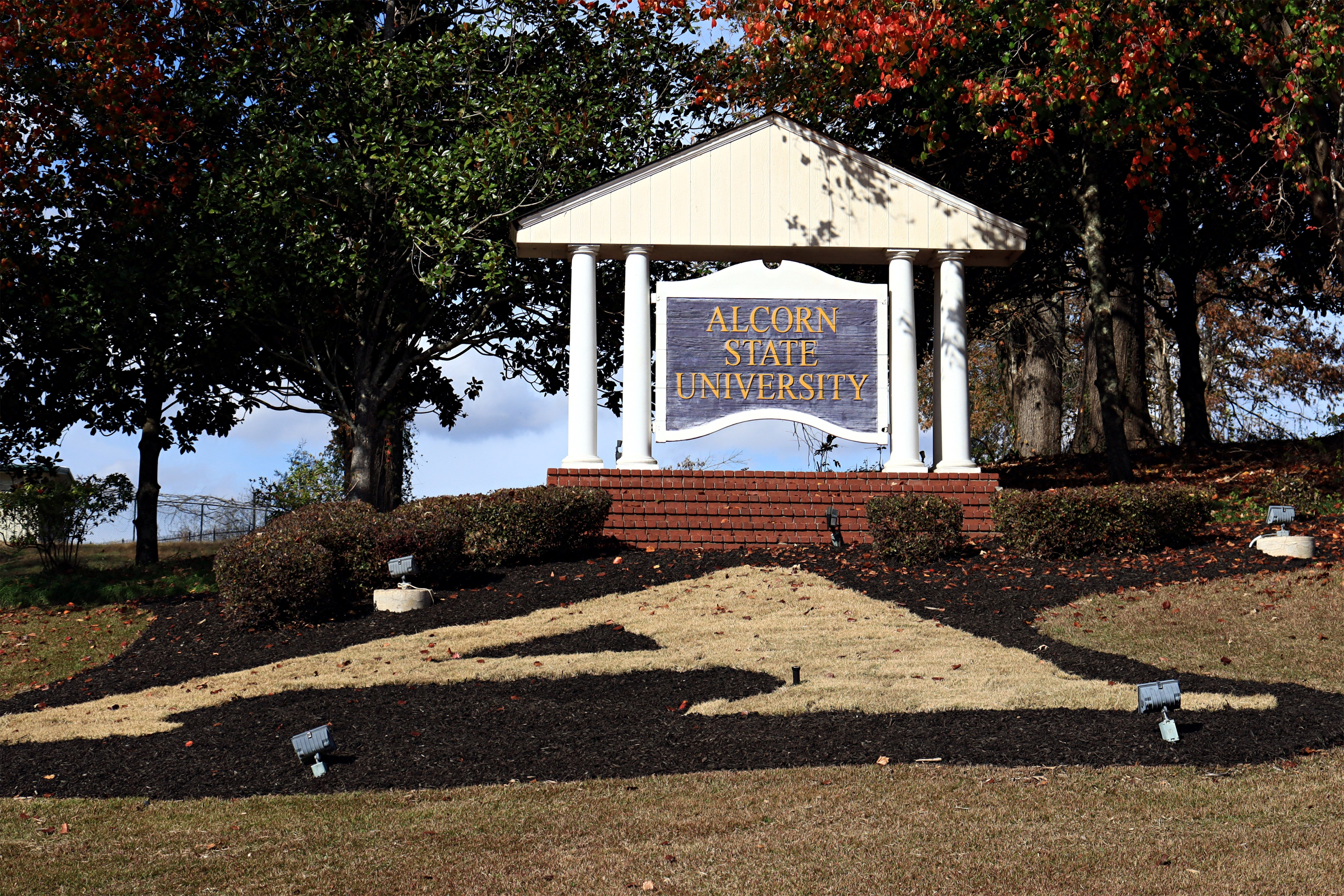
Alcorn State University entrance sign

The main campus is located in Alcorn State University census-designated place, an unincorporated area in Claiborne County, Mississippi. The campus is often referred to as "The Reservation". It is 45 miles (72 km) south of Vicksburg, 40 miles (64 km) north of Natchez, and 80 miles (130 km) southwest of Jackson. It is near Lorman.

The Nursing School is located in Natchez, Mississippi. The university also has technology centers at the Thad Cochran Mississippi Center for Innovation and Technology (MCITy) in Vicksburg.

=== Campus housing ===
Male residence halls include Medgar Wiley Evers Heritage Village Complex A and B, Hiram Revels Hall, and Albert Lott Hall. Female residence halls include Medgar Wiley Evers Heritage Village Complex buildings C and D, John Burrus Hall, Beulah Robinson Hall, and the Female Honors Residence Hall.

Faculty housing, which is open to full time employees, and their dependents, is zoned to the Claiborne County School District. Port Gibson High School is the comprehensive high school of the district.

The county is in the district of Copiah–Lincoln Community College, and has been since 1967.

== Athletics ==
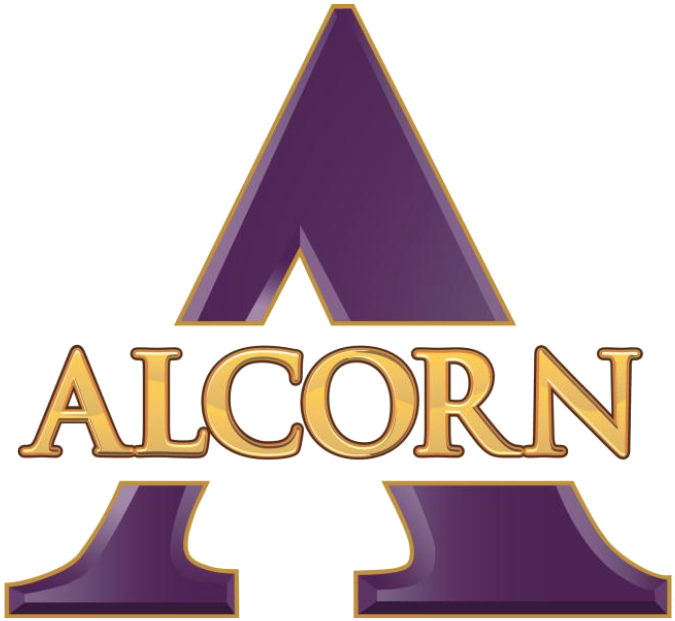
Alcorn athletics logo

Alcorn State is a member of the Southwestern Athletic Conference (SWAC) and participates in NCAA Division I FCS. Alcorn sponsors 15 athletic programs.

== Sounds of Dyn-O-mite ==
Alcorn State University's marching band was founded in the 1960s and is known as the "Sounds of Dyn-O-mite" (SOD). Led by four or five drum majors, SOD has more than 190+ members. The band was invited to perform in the 2025 Macy's Thanksgiving Day Parade.

The "World Renowned Golden Girls" (GGs) is the danceline that has been featured with SOD since its inception. Founded in 1968, they are the first danceline (no twirling batons) to feature an HBCU marching band, which is why they often refer to themselves as "The Mother of HBCU dancelines."

== Demographics ==
Undergraduate demographics as of Fall 2023
Race and ethnicity	Total
Black	96%
White	2%
Hispanic	1%
International student	1%
Economic diversity
Low-income (Note: The percentage of students who received an income-based federal Pell grant intended for low-income students.)	77%
Affluent (Note: The percentage of students who are a part of the American middle class at the bare minimum.)	23%

Alcorn State University CDP
- Census-designated place
- Location within Mississippi Location within the United States
- Coordinates: 31°52′49.65″N 91°8′26.42″W
- Country: United States
- State: Mississippi
- County: Claiborne
- Elevation: 259 ft (79 m)

Population (2020)
  - Total: 1,120
- Time zone: UTC−6 (Central (CST))
  - Summer (DST): UTC−5 (CDT)
- GNIS feature ID: 2586580

Alcorn State University CDP is a census-designated place (CDP) and the official name for an area covering the Alcorn State University campus, in Claiborne County, Mississippi, United States.

It first appeared as a CDP in the 2010 U.S. census. The population at the 2020 census was 1,120. while the Fall 2019 enrollment at Alcorn State University was 3,523.

Historical population
Census	Pop.	Note	%±
2010	1,107		—
2020	1,120		1.2%
U.S. Decennial Census; 2010 2020

=== Racial and ethnic composition ===
Alcorn State University CDP, Mississippi – racial and ethnic composition Note: the US Census treats Hispanic/Latino as an ethnic category. This table excludes Latinos from the racial categories and assigns them to a separate category. Hispanics/Latinos may be of any race.
Race / ethnicity (NH = Non-Hispanic)	Pop. 2010	Pop 2020	% 2010	% 2020
White alone (NH)	15	5	1.47%	0.45%
Black or African American alone (NH)	953	1,107	93.71%	98.84%
Native American or Alaska Native alone (NH)	1	0	0.10%	0.00%
Asian alone (NH)	12	0	1.18%	0.00%
Native Hawaiian or Pacific Islander alone (NH)	0	0	0.00%	0.00%
Other race alone (NH)	1	1	0.10%	0.09%
Mixed race or Multiracial (NH)	16	1	1.57%	0.09%
Hispanic or Latino (any race)	19	6	1.87%	0.54%
Total	1,107	1,120	100.00%	100.00%

== Notable alumni ==
=== Politics and activism ===
Name	Class year	Notability	Reference(s)
Albert Butler	1970	Mississippi State Senator	
Horace R. Cayton, Sr.	c.1880s	Journalist and politician, one of the first Black people to serve on county and state delegations in Seattle, Washington	
Jennifer Riley Collins	1987	Executive director of the Mississippi NAACP	
Katie G. Dorsett		Member of the North Carolina Senate from the 28th district	
Medgar Evers	1948	First NAACP field secretary and assassinated civil rights activist	
Cornelius J. Jones	1870s	Attorney, voting rights activist, politician. Mississippi state legislator. One of the first African American attorneys to argue a case before the United States Supreme Court	
Ed Smith		Former alderman of the 28th ward in Chicago, Illinois 1983–2010	
Charles Tillman	1958	Mayor of Jackson, Mississippi	

=== Sports ===
Name	Class year	Notability	Reference(s)
Willie Alexander	1971	Former professional football player for the Houston Oilers	
Emmanuel Arceneaux	2009	Current CFL and former NFL player	
Donald Driver	1999	Former professional football player for the Green Bay Packers	
Leslie Frazier	1980	Defensive coordinator of the Tampa Bay Buccaneers, former head coach of the Minnesota Vikings, former defensive coordinator of the Minnesota Vikings, former special assistant coach with the Indianapolis Colts	
Jimmie Giles	1977	Former professional football player for the Tampa Bay Buccaneers	
Louis Green	2002	Former NFL player for the Denver Broncos	
Issiac Holt	1985	Former professional football player for the Minnesota Vikings and Dallas Cowboys	
Nate Hughes	2008	Former NFL player for the Detroit Lions	
Iris Kyle		10-time overall Ms. Olympia professional bodybuilder	
Garry Lewis		Former professional football player for the Oakland Raiders	
Milton Mack		Former professional football player for the Detroit Lions	
Fred McNair		Former professional Canadian and arena football player, brother of Steve McNair, and head coach of Alcorn State Football	
Steve McNair	1996	Former professional quarterback for the Tennessee Titans and Baltimore Ravens	
Bryant Mix	1997	Former NFL player for the Houston Oilers	
Elex Price	1973	Former professional football player for the New Orleans Saints	
Frank Purnell		Former professional football player for the Green Bay Packers	
Lee Robinson	2009	Professional football player for the Tampa Bay Buccaneers and Denver Broncos	
Chad Slaughter	2000	Former professional football player for the Oakland Raiders	
Torrance Small	1992	Former NFL player for the New Orleans Saints	
Larry Smith	1980	Former NBA player and assistant coach in the NBA and WNBA	
Charlie Spiller	2007	Former NFL player for the Tampa Bay Buccaneers	
Jack Spinks	1952	Former professional football player for the New York Giants	
John Thierry	1994	Former NFL player for the Chicago Bears	
Cedric Tillman	1992	Former professional football player for the Denver Broncos	
Dwayne White		Former professional football player for the St. Louis Rams	
Damien Wilson		Linebacker for the Dallas Cowboys, transferred out of Alcorn after his freshman season	
Roynell Young	1980	Former professional football player for the Philadelphia Eagles	

=== Other fields ===
Name	Class year	Notability	Reference(s)
Joseph Dunbar		Scientist	
Michael Clarke Duncan	attended	Actor	
Alex Haley	attended	Author	
Adena Williams Loston	1973	President of St. Philip's College in San Antonio, Texas	
Kimberly Morgan		Miss Mississippi 2007	
Alexander O'Neal	attended	Musician	
Joseph Edison Walker	1903	President of Universal Life Insurance Company in Memphis, Tennessee	

== Notable faculty ==
- Melerson Guy Dunham – educator, lay minister, civil rights activist, and history; taught at Alcorn until her retirement in 1970; wrote the book Centennial History of Alcorn College
