= Historical Dictionary of Turkmenistan =

2004 book by Rafis Abazov

- Author: Rafis Abazov
- Series: Historical Dictionaries of Asia, Oceania, and the Middle East
- Publisher: Scarecrow Press
- Publication place: Lanham, Maryland
- ISBN: 978-0-8108-5362-1
- OCLC: 55981894

The Historical Dictionary of Turkmenistan is an encyclopedia on the history of Turkmenistan. Written by Rafis Abazov, the book was published in December 2004 by Scarecrow Press.
