= Levi J. Rowan =

American academic administrator (1871–1934)

Levi John Rowan
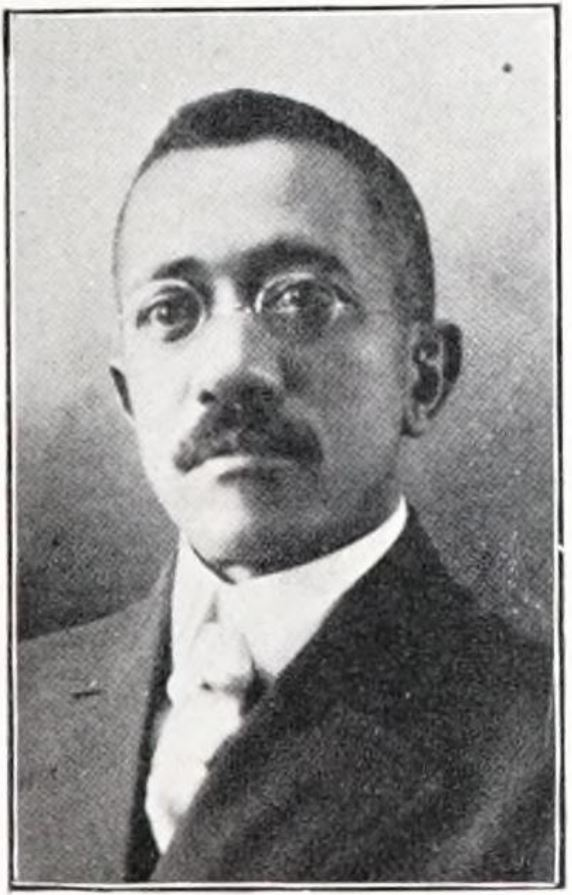

7th President of Alcorn Agricultural and Mechanical College
- In office 1905–1911
- Preceded by: William H. Lanier
- Succeeded by: John Adams Martin

9th President of Alcorn Agricultural and Mechanical College
- In office 1915–1934
- Preceded by: John Adams Martin
- Succeeded by: Isiah S. Sanders

Personal details
- Born: August 7, 1871 Rodney, Mississippi, United States
- Died: June 28, 1934 (aged 62) Vicksburg, Mississippi, United States
- Resting place: Vicksburg, Mississippi, United States
- Spouse: Mattie Foote (m. 1896–)
- Children: 4
- Education: Alcorn Agricultural and Mechanical College
- Occupation: Academic administrator, college president, teacher, photographer

Levi John Rowan (August 7, 1871 – June 28, 1934) was an American academic administrator, educator, and photographer. He served two terms as the president of Alcorn Agricultural and Mechanical College (now Alcorn State University) a historically black public university in Lorman, Mississippi. He also used the name L. J. Rowan.

== Life and career ==
Levi John Rowan was born on August 7, 1871, in Rodney, Mississippi, to parents Martha (née Walker) and Sidney Rowan. He graduated with a B.S. degree in May 1893 from Alcorn Agricultural and Mechanical College (now Alcorn State University).

In 1896, Rowan married Mattie Foote, and they had four daughters. After graduation, Rowan taught for 5 years near his hometown of Rodney, Mississippi.

In 1905, he became the 7th president of Alcorn Agricultural and Mechanical College, a role he held until 1911 when he was succeeded by John Adams Martin. After his first term, Rowan taught English at Alcorn. He served as second term as president of Alcorn Agricultural and Mechanical College from 1915 until 1934. During his tenure as president, the campus was expanded.

== Death and legacy ==
Rowan died on June 28, 1934, in a hospital in Vicksburg, Mississippi. He had been sick, and suffered from kidney disease and heart disease.

From 1950 until 2017, the Rowan School (or L. J. Rowan Middle School) in Jackson, Mississippi was named in his honor.

An exhibition of his photography was held at the Columbus–Lowndes Public Library in 2017. The Levi J. Rowan Photograph Collection is held at the Margaret Walker Center at Jackson State University.
