= Lists of dictionaries =

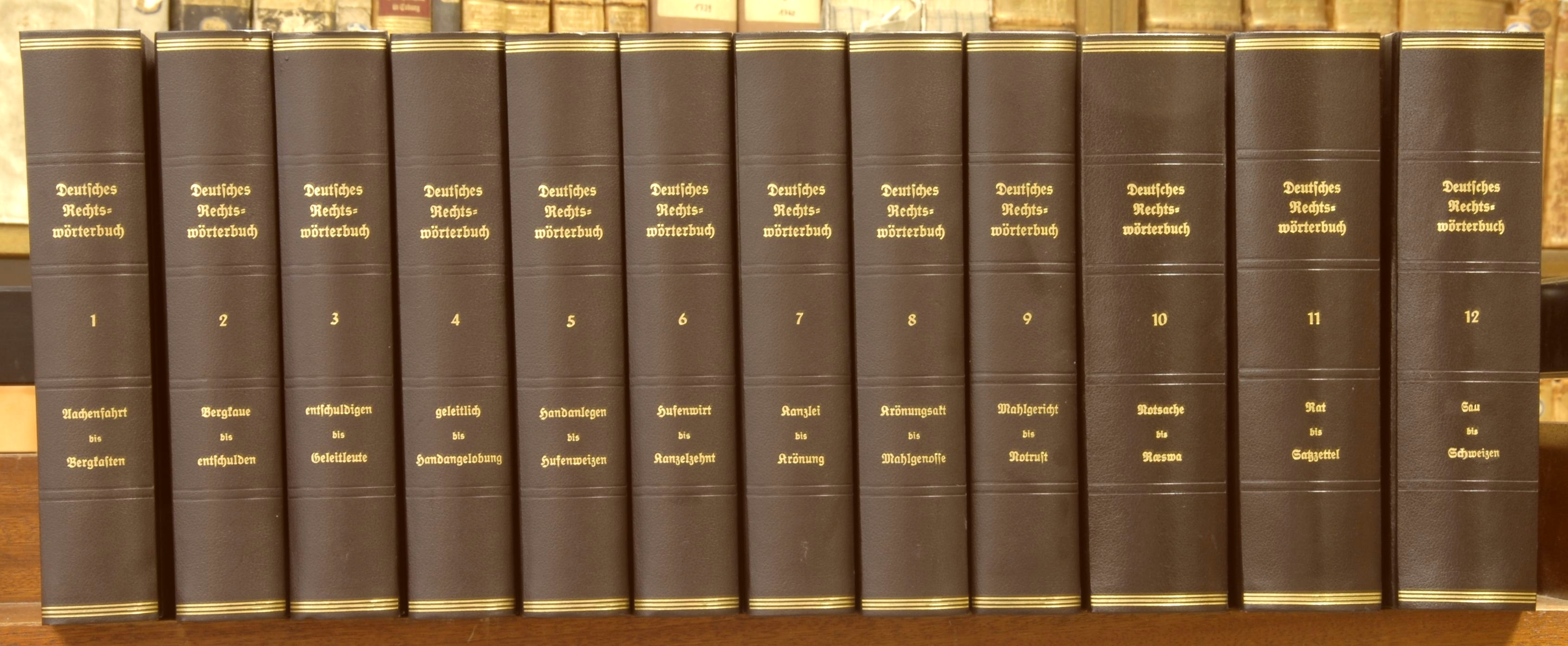
Deutsches Rechtswörterbuch (Dictionary of Historical German Legal Terms)

Lists of dictionaries cover general and specialized dictionaries, collections of words in one or more specific languages, and collections of terms in specialist fields. They are organized by language, specialty and other properties.

== By language ==
- List of Arabic dictionaries
- List of Croatian dictionaries
- List of Czech dictionaries
- List of Dutch dictionaries
- List of English dictionaries
- List of French dictionaries
- List of German dictionaries
- List of Hebrew dictionaries
- List of Hokkien dictionaries
- List of Japanese dictionaries
- List of Scottish Gaelic dictionaries

== By specialty ==
- List of Bible dictionaries
- List of biographical dictionaries
- List of biographical dictionaries of women writers in English
- Bibliography of encyclopedias: general biographies
- Etymological dictionary
- List of Scarecrow Press historical dictionaries
- Gazetteer#List of gazetteers

== Other ==
- List of online dictionaries
- List of Wiktionaries
- List of dictionaries by number of words

== See also ==
- List of almanacs
- Lists of encyclopedias
- List of libraries
