= W. H. Lanier =

American educator (1855–1929)

William Henry Lanier
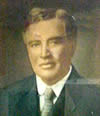

6th President of Alcorn Agricultural and Mechanical College
- In office 1899–1905
- Preceded by: Edward H. Triplett
- Succeeded by: Levi John Rowan

Personal details
- Born: September 1855 Autauga County, Alabama, U.S.
- Died: November 1929 (aged 74) Jackson, Mississippi, U.S.
- Spouse: Elizabeth Ernie Dabney (m. 1900)
- Children: 2
- Education: Roger Williams University (BA)
- Occupation: Educator, academic administrator
- Known for: Lanier High School named after him President of Alcorn State University (1899-1905)

William Henry Lanier (c. 1855 – 1929), commonly known as W. H. Lanier, was an American academic administrator, and prominent educator in Mississippi during the late 19th century and early 20th century. He served as the 6th president of Alcorn Agricultural and Mechanical College (now Alcorn State University) a historically black public university in Lorman, Mississippi.

== Background ==
William Henry Lanier was born into slavery in Autauga County, Alabama in September 1855 (some sources indicate 1851). In the 1870 U.S. Census, which was enumerated on July 6, 1870, his age was listed as 14. In the 1900 U.S. Census his month and year of birth are shown as September 1859.

He was educated at Tougaloo College, Oberlin College, and Fisk University before obtaining his B.A. from Roger Williams University in Nashville, Tennessee.

== Career ==
He taught school in several small towns in Mississippi, before becoming president of Alcorn State University from 1899 to 1905. He would subsequently serve as head of the black schools in Yazoo City until 1911, when he was elected head of the black public schools in Jackson. As principal of Robertson High School, Lanier would serve as head of the black Jackson schools until his death in 1929.

== Personal life ==
In 1900, he married Elizabeth Ernie Dabney. This union produced two children.

While Lanier was generally well-liked by whites, many blacks despised him. Local media attributed this to "jealousy."

On Wednesday, August 16, 1911, while still serving as the head of the black schools in Yazoo City, Lanier was physically attacked by J. D. Suttlar, a black mail carrier in a highly publicized incident.

== Death and legacy ==
Lanier died in November 1929 in Jackson. Presidents of six black colleges spoke at his funeral. All black public schools in Jackson were closed on that day out of respect for the deceased.

Lanier High School in Jackson, Mississippi is named after him.
