= List of Czech dictionaries =

This annotated list includes

1. major present-day Czech-English dictionaries,
2. Czech dictionaries, both contemporary and historical.

== Czech-English dictionaries ==
Notable present-day Czech-English dictionaries are:

- Fronek, Josef. Velký česko-anglický slovník = Large Czech-English dictionary. 2nd, enlarged ed., Voznice: Leda, 2013. xlvi, 1743 pp. ISBN 978-80-7335-322-3. A comprehensive dictionary, intended also for English speakers.
- Poldauf, Ivan. Velký česko-anglický slovník = Comprehensive Czech-English dictionary. 3rd ed. Čelákovice: W.D. Publications, 1996. 1187 pp. ISBN 80-902180-3-2. A handy-sized dictionary, albeit somewhat out of date.

== Czech dictionaries ==
There are three dictionaries of current Czech that are of use for native speakers:

- Kroupová, Libuše et al. Slovník spisovné češtiny pro školu a veřejnost: s Dodatkem Ministerstva školství, mládeže a tělovýchovy České republiky. (SSČ) 4th ed. Praha: Academia, 2005. 647 pp. ISBN 80-200-1347-4. Basic Czech dictionary, contains 45,366 headwords, intended primarily for use in schools and for laymen. Online as part of the Internet Language Reference Book.
- Havránek, Bohuslav, et al. Slovník spisovného jazyka českého. (SSJČ) 2nd ed. Praha: Academia, 1989. 8 vols. A dictionary of first choice when reading the classics, the SSJČ contains a total of 192,908 entries and sub-entries. Online.
- Příruční slovník jazyka českého. (PSJČ) V Praze: Státní nakladatelství, 1935–1957. 9 vols. The PSJČ is largely outdated, though it may be of use thanks to the wealth of information (ca 250,000 entries) and meticulous definitions. Online.

== See also ==
- Lists of dictionaries
