= Guide Mayer =

Art auction listings

Mayer International Auction Records
- Cover of 1992 edition
- Language: English, French
- Subject: Listing of international art auctions results
- Genre: Dictionary
- Publication place: France

Mayer International Auction Records aka Guide Mayer is listing international art auctions results as a dictionary for both fine art amateurs and collectors as well as art market professionals like galleries and auctioneers. 800 auction houses from 40 countries contributed information to the publication. 1.5 million records have been collected on more than 100,000 artists of over 100 different nationalities.

== History ==
The dictionary was first published in 1962 by Enrique Mayer up until 1982 when Enrique Mayer sold the publication to the Migros Group in Switzerland. In 1986 Migros sold the Mayer dictionary to Acatos Editions in Lausanne, which published the book until 2001. In 1993 Editions Acatos sold an electronic publishing licence to Digital Media Resources Ltd. from London for the duration of 10 years. In 1995, International Auction Records and Livre International des Ventes joined to become Mayer, and changed its format to a two-volume set, arranged alphabetically, listing the categories of prints, photographs, drawings, watercolors, paintings and sculptures under one name entry. The Mayer International Auction Records database was first published on CD-ROM by Digital Media Resources in 1994 and the database was first published online on the internet in 1996. In 1997 David Dehaeck purchased the name and the totality of the publishing rights from Silvio Acatos, publisher and principal owner of Edition Acatos. In 2000 David Dehaeck sold the title and the publishing rights to iCollector.com from London that soon after became part of LiveAuction Group from Canada.

== Guide Mayer quotations ==
Listing by artists as a dictionary, the book was split into categories such as:

- Paintings
- Sculptures
- Drawings
- Prints
- Watercolours
- Photographs

== See also ==
- Lists of dictionaries
