= Alpha consumer =

Person who adopts a product and validates it

An alpha consumer is someone that plays a key role in connecting with the concept behind a product, then adopting that product, and finally validating it for the rest of society. The term was coined by entertainment economist Michael Wolf in 1999 and published in his book The Entertainment Economy.

The example given by Michael Wolf in The Entertainment Economy was:

The first few people to see the next hot movie, the first few people to own a cellular phone, the first few people to wear the new pastels and brights—all achieve a status boost by being in the know, being the one others follow. I call these trendsetters 'alpha consumers'. Theirs is the key role of connecting with the concept behind a product, then adopting that product, and finally validating it for the rest of society. If hits are like explosions, alphas are at the epicenter. They feel the first vibrations of the explosion and transmit them to the rest of the culture. Alphas are not the same for every product. The women who flocked to the touchy-feely movie The Bridges of Madison County followed their daughters to Titanic. The college music fans who discovered Hootie & the Blowfish were different from the VH1 audience that made them a national phenomenon. The first Jeep buyers were a far cry from the soccer moms now cruising about in their nine-seater Suburbans.

== See also ==
- Early adopter
