= Spillers (disambiguation) =

Spillers was a British company that owned flour mills.

Spillers may also refer to:

- Spillers Records, a shop in Cardiff, Wales
- Ashley Spillers (born 1986), an American actress
- Hortense Spillers (born 1942), an American literary critic
