= Charlie Spiller =

American football player (born 1983)

Profile
- Position: Wide receiver

Personal information
- Born: October 18, 1983 (age 43); Woodville, Mississippi
- Listed height: 5 ft 9 in (1.75 m)
- Listed weight: 168 lb (76 kg)

Career information
- College: Alcorn State
- NFL draft: 2007: undrafted

Career history
- Tampa Bay Buccaneers (2008)*
- * Offseason or practice squad member only

Charlie Spiller (born October 18, 1983) is an American former football wide receiver. He was signed by the Tampa Bay Buccaneers as a street free agent in 2008. He played college football at Alcorn State.
