= William Harrison Bell =

William Harrison Bell (March 28, 1927 – June 1, 2016) was an American Oral and Maxillofacial Surgeon and a Professor of Surgery who is known for his contributions to the field of Orthognathic Surgery. Dr. Bell's groundbreaking research provided a biologic basis for the Le Fort I osteotomy and other orthognathic surgical procedures used to reposition the facial skeleton. Active throughout his life, his later work provided a biologic rationale for distraction osteogenesis of the facial skeleton, a technique used to gradually lengthen bone at a rate of 1mm a day. A prolific author, his publications provided a thorough description of the diagnosis and management of dentofacial deformity, surgical technique, and detailed figures that illustrated the operations in sufficient detail that would provide generations of surgeons the necessary information from which to apply a surgical-orthodontic approach to facial deformity. He is credited in the United States with pioneering the transition of the field of Oral Surgery to become Oral and Maxillofacial Surgery.

== Life ==
He was born in St. Louis, Missouri. Dr. Bell was raised by his grandfather and his mother. He attended Saint Louis University for college. He served in World War II in Navy after college and then returned from war to finish his training in Oral Surgery. He received his Oral Surgery training from Metropolitan Hospital in New York and University of Texas Health Science Center in Houston. He graduated from there in 1956 and taught for 5 years. Dr. Bell was extensively involved in research. In 1970, he was recruited to the University of Texas Southwestern Medical Center/Parkland Memorial Hospital where he continued his NIH-funded research focused on the wound healing and blood flow that is associated with surgery of the upper and lower jaw. After more than 20 years at UT Southwestern, Dr. Bell moved across town and became Professor of Surgery at Texas A&M University Baylor College of Dentistry from where he retired in 2002.

Dr. Bell has written many textbooks on the subject of Orthognathic Surgery. He has written over 150 scientific papers, 5-+ book chapters and over 7 textbooks. Dr. Bell was married for 51 years to Sherry Bell. They had children Bryan, Christine, Adam and Elizabeth. Their son Bryan Bell is also an Oral Surgeon who completed his training from University of North Carolina. Dr. William Harrison Bell died on June 1, 2016, in Stowe, Vermont.

== Textbooks ==
- Distraction Osteogenesis of the Facial Skeleton (2006)
- Modern Practice in Orthognathic and Reconstructive Surgery (Volume 1, 2) (1992)
- Surgical Correction of Dentofacial Deformities (1980)

== Awards and positions ==
- University of Texas Dental Branch/School of Dentistry, Houston - Professor (1956-1972)
- University of Texas Southwestern Medical Centerr in Dallas (1972-1992)
- Texas A&M University Baylor College of Dentistry - Professor (1992-2002)
- St. Louis University Alumni Merit Award
- American Association of Oral and Maxillofacial Surgeons Research Recognition Award (1977)
- William John Gies Award (1984)
- W. Harry Archer Award
