= Margaret Walker Center =

Museum, archive, and meeting place open to students and the public

Coordinates: 32.29679°N 90.20794°W

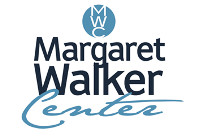
- Former name: Institute for the Study of the History, Life, and Culture of Black People
- Established: 1968
- Location: Jackson State University, Jackson, Mississippi, U.S.
- Founder: Margaret Walker

The Margaret Walker Center (MWC), located in the heritage listed Ayer Hall on the campus of Jackson State University in Jackson, Mississippi, is a public archive and museum dedicated to the preservation, interpretation, and dissemination of the culture and history of the African American community. The MWC also advocates the preservation of the built environment such as historic 1903 Ayer Hall, which is the oldest structure on the Jackson State University campus and was named to the National Register of Historic Places in 1977.

== History ==
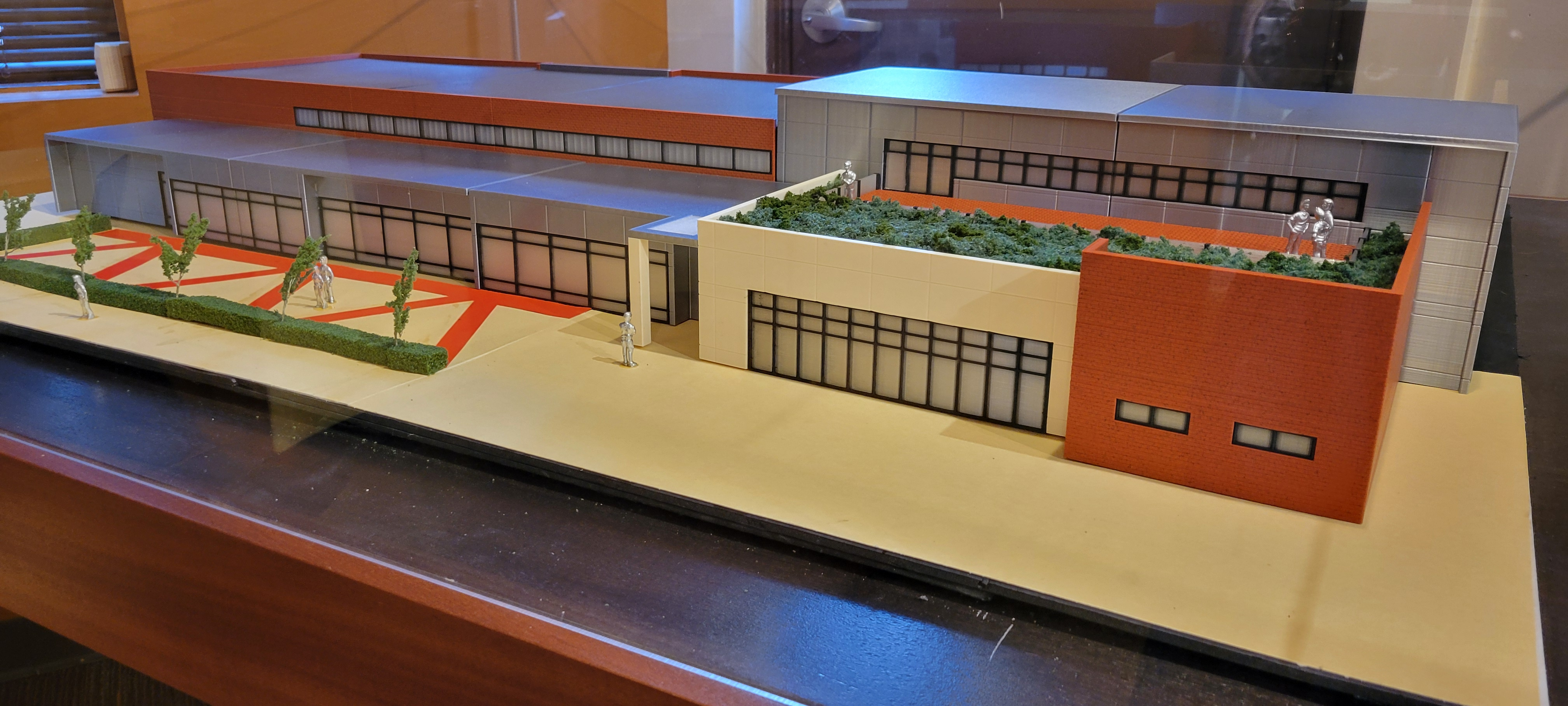
Proposed MWC 3D Model

Founded at Jackson State College in September 1968 by English professor Dr. Margaret Walker Alexander, widely known as Margaret Walker, the Margaret Walker Center was originally called the Institute for the Study of the History, Life, and Culture of Black People. The institute was funded in part by a Title III Grant under the Suny- Jackson State College Cooperative Project. The creation of the institute reflected Walker's interest in the beginnings of the movement for Black studies with a stated goal of increasing "the general knowledge of all people in the history or heritage of the life and culture of black people." The institute was designed as an inter-cultural, inter-departmental, and inter-disciplinary program meant to enrich courses with specific information concerning the heritage, culture, and life of all Black people within the regular curriculum of Jackson State.

Through the institute, Walker hosted a series of conferences that were the first of their kind, like the 1971 National Evaluative Conference on Black Studies, the Summer Institute for Directed Research in Black Studies and the Phillis Wheatley Poetry Festival in 1973, and the Conference on the Plight of the Cities and Conference on Africa and African Affairs in 1977. Following the retirement of Walker in 1979, the institute was directed by Dr. Alferdteen Brown Harrison and renamed the Margaret Walker Alexander National Research Center. In 2009, Dr. Robert Luckett was hired as the third director, after which the Center's name was shortened to the current Margaret Walker Center. In 2022, the Center received a $450,000 Humanities in Place grant from the Mellon Foundation to fund a two-part project that builds on the center’s expansion while honoring the legacy of Black women at JSU.

== Collections ==
Upon her retirement, Margaret Walker donated over 130 of her personal journals which, along with her literary, administrative, and other personal papers, are the centerpiece of the Center’s manuscript collections and constitute one of the single largest collections of a modern Black, female writer anywhere in the world. Also included in Walker's papers is the little known, unfinished novel, Goose Island, first penned in the 1930s but set to finally be published in 2025 by Augusta University professor Seretha Williams, through University Press of Mississippi. The Center houses close to forty other significant manuscript collections as well as artifacts, textiles, scrapbooks, photography collections, map collections, book collections, and nearly 1,000 individual oral histories.

== Events ==
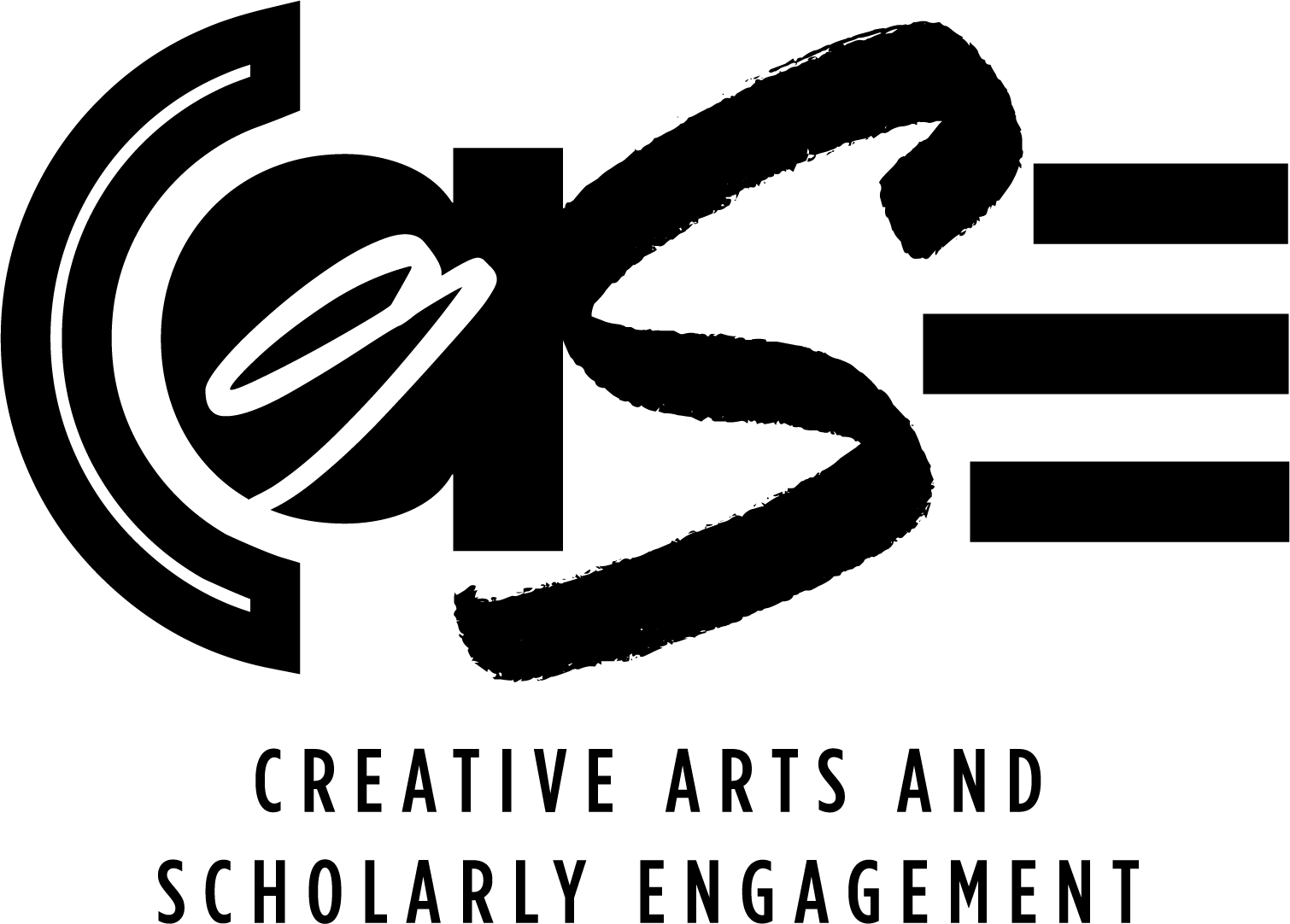
Creative Arts and Scholarly Engagement Festival Logo

The Center hosts a number of events annually, including one of the first and longest running celebrations of the life of Dr. Martin Luther King Jr. in the nation. Margaret Walker began MLK Convocation at Jackson State to honor King just nine months after his assassination in January 1968. Also in January, the Center hosts the Annual For My People Awards named after Margaret Walker’s classic poem. Past recipients have included James Meredith, Unita Blackwell, Robert Clark, Lerone Bennett, Andrew Young, Reena Evers-Everette, Charlayne Hunter-Gault, Dave Dennis Sr. and Charlie Cobb. Every April, the Center holds the Annual Creative Arts & Scholarly Engagement (CASE) Festival which welcomes proposals from high school, undergraduate, and graduate students on any topic in the categories of poetry/spoken word, visual arts, performing arts, and essays. In May, the Center pays tribute to the lives lost in the tragic Jackson State killings in 1970 with the Gibbs-Green Commemoration. The Jubilee Picnic celebrates Margaret Walker’s birthday every year on July 7 with a free and open to the public afternoon of food and fellowship.

== Exhibits ==
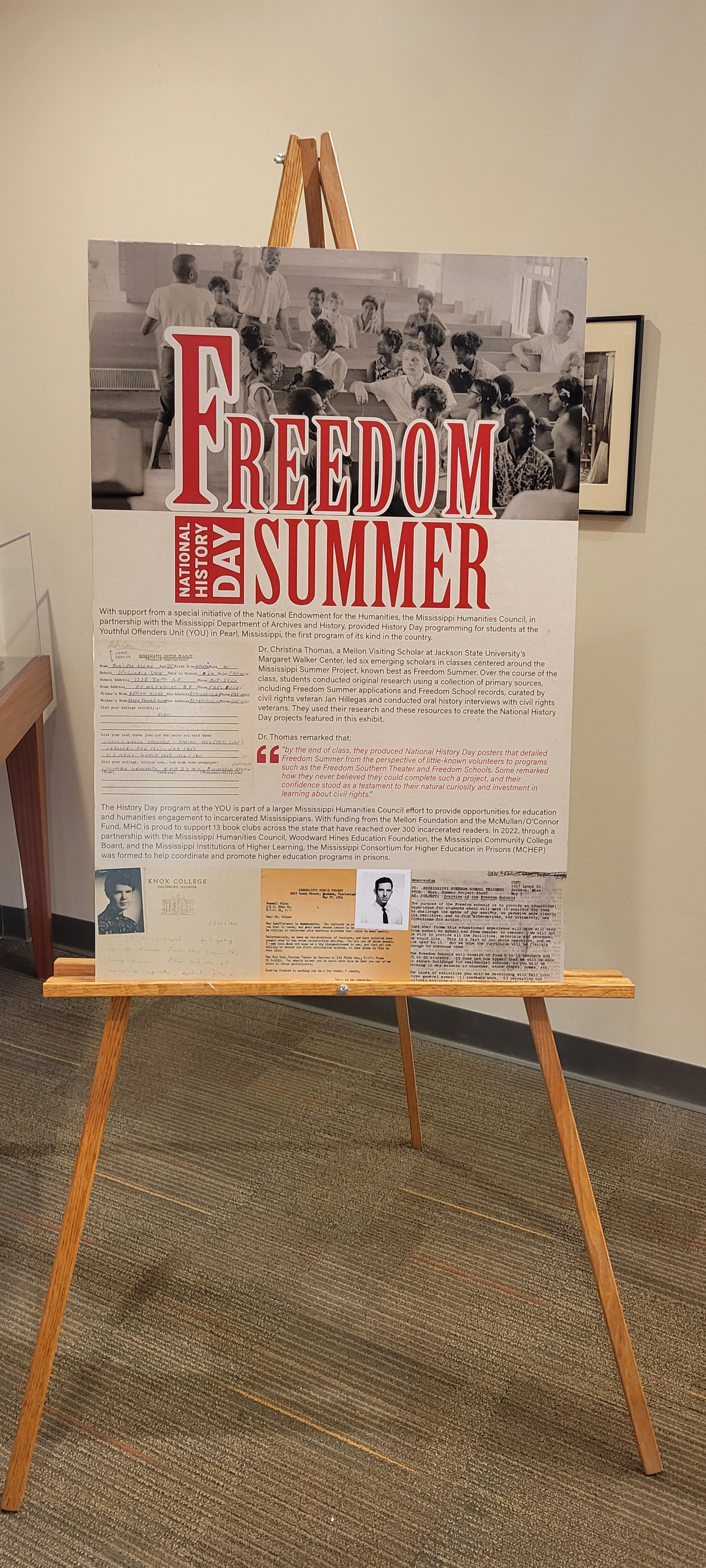
National History Day Freedom Summer Exhibit

Over the years, aside from the four standing exhibits in Ayer Hall, the Center has hosted several notable rotating and traveling exhibits. Hosting the National Building Museum’s “Evicted” exhibit for three months in 2021 came alongside the creation of an oral history project conducted by architecture students at Mississippi State University. In 2022, the LGBTQ Fund of Mississippi sponsored yet another oral history project that resulted in the temporary exhibition of "Thee Black Pride in JXN". That same year, “A Decade of Action,” a 12-panel exhibit focused on events that occurred primarily in the area of Jackson State and Lynch Street was unveiled at Ayer Hall before traveling to Mississippi College, the Ripley Public Library, and the Columbus-Lowndes Public Library, as well as other locations in the state. Most recently, an exhibit created through Visiting Scholar Dr. Christina Thomas' work with incarcerated students from the Youthful Offenders Unit at Central Mississippi Correctional Facility, has been displayed at the COFO Civil Rights Education Center.
