= Jon Woronoff =

American writer (born 1938)

Jon Woronoff (Arthur Jon Woronoff, 1938 — 2026) was an American author and editor and previously an interpreter and translator. His primary work has been "historical dictionaries" on various subjects. He is also well known for his books from the late 1970s through 1990s presenting views on East Asia, particularly Japan, which were heterodox at the time, but are now mainstream.

== Biography ==
He was born in New York City in 1938, and lived there until the age of about twenty, after which he studied and worked in Europe (with numerous visits to Africa) for about fifteen years, Hong Kong and Japan (with visits to other Asian countries) for about ten years, again five years in the U.S. in Washington, D.C. and since 1991 in Europe, first in France, followed by Spain.

He studied at the Bronx High School of Science and New York University, where he received a B.A. in 1959. He obtained a diploma of translator-interpreter at the Interpreter's School of the University of Geneva in 1962. He then studied at the Graduate Institute of International Studies in Geneva until 1965, when he was granted a licence en sciences politique et economique.

From 1962 and into the early 1990s Woronoff worked as a simultaneous interpreter or translator for numerous international organizations, including the United Nations, World Health Organization, World Meteorological Organization, Organization of African Unity, Economic Commission for Africa, and the U.S. State Department. During the period 1973–79, he founded and managed Interlingua Language Services, with offices in Hong Kong, Tokyo, Manila and New York City.

As of 1970, he was also a free-lance journalist for various newspapers and magazines including Asian Business, Oriental Economist, Nikkei, Toyo Keizai, South China Morning Post, Financial Times Syndication, Asian Wall Street Journal Weekly, etc. He was a special columnist for Mainichi Daily News and Japanalysis. Most of his reporting was devoted to East Asia, especially Japan, Korea, Hong Kong and China, but other places as well, and in the earlier part Africa.

Since 1973, Woronoff has been an external editor for Scarecrow Press and then Rowman & Littlefield of Lanham, Maryland. All his work has dealt with "historical dictionaries" or roughly encyclopedias or encyclopedic dictionaries of countries or broad topics. The first series he initiated was the African Historical Dictionaries, but these were joined over the years by other series, including on Asia and Europe, on literature and the arts, wars, historical periods, U.S. diplomacy and history, professions and industries, religions and philosophies, international organizations, and others. About one thousand of these have been published over the years with about 400 presently in print.

== Writings ==
=== Japan ===
Periodically Jon Woronoff wrote his own books, first on Africa, then on Asia. Most notable among these are the books on Japanese economics, business, and society. His critical approach clashed with conventional wisdom in the 1980s and 90s when Japan was often considered a ‘miracle’ economy. He argued that Japanese management systems were far from ideal, suffering from inefficiency and rigidity. He also insisted that actual living standards in Japan were much lower than the impression given by statistics such as per capita GDP. It could be argued that Japan's sluggish economic growth in recent decades has vindicated many of his views. Despite controversy when they were first published, many similar ideas are now part of mainstream orthodox opinion on the Japanese economy and society.

=== East Asia ===
His books on other parts of East Asia, especially Hong Kong, Korea, Taiwan, Singapore and China, were equally controversial, but for the opposite reason. When written, the common opinion was that they were “basket cases” with no hope whatsoever of economic development. Yet, they were already in their takeoff phase and this was emphasized in several hundred newspaper and magazine articles as well as several books. Going against the pundits here also resulted in considerable criticism and refusal by some of the better known periodicals to publish his material. By now, of course, there is no question but that these views were by-and-large correct and paved the way for a better understanding of the dynamics of East Asia.

== Books ==
- Organizing African Unity (1971)
- West African Wager: Houphouët versus Nkrumah (1973)
  - Review: Tunteng, P-Kiven (1973). "West African Wager: Houphouët versus Nkrumah by Jon Woronoff Metuchen, N.J., Scarecrow Press, 1972. Pp. xii + 357. $10.00". The Journal of Modern African Studies. 11 (2): 317–321. doi:10.1017/S0022278X00008351.
- Hong Kong: Capitalist Paradise (1978)
- Japan: The Coming Economic Crisis (1980), also published in Japanese
- Japan: The Coming Social Crisis (1982), also in Japanese
- Inside Japan, Inc. (1982)
- Japan's Wasted Workers (1983)
  - Review: Levine, Solomon B. (1986). "[untitled] (review of Labor Relations in Japan Today and Japan's Wasted Workers)". Journal of Japanese Studies. 12 (1): 162–168. doi:10.2307/132455. JSTOR 132455.
- Korea's Economy: Man Made Miracle (1983)
- World Trade War (1985), also in Japanese
- The Japan Syndrome (1985)
- Japan’s Commercial Empire (1986), also in Japanese
- Japan's market: the distribution system (1986), with Michael R. Czinkota
- Politics, The Japanese Way (1989), also in Japanese
- Asia’s “Miracle” Economies (1991)
- Unlocking Japan’s Market with Michael Czinkota (1991)
- Japan As – Anything But – Number One (1991)
- The Japanese Management Mystique: The Reality Behind the Myth (1992)
- Japanese Targeting: Successes, Failures, Lessons (1992)
- The “No-Nonsense” Guide to Doing Business in Japan (1992)
- The Japanese Economic Crisis (1993)
- The Japanese Social Crisis (1997)
- The No-Nonsense Guide To Doing Business in Japan (2000, Second Edition 2001)
