= David C. Tambo =

- Education: University of Wisconsin–Madison (MA)
- Occupations: Historian; archivist
- Spouse: Shirley

David C. Tambo is a historian of slavery in pre-colonial Nigeria, editor for the Nigerian oral histories of the Plateau History Project in the 1980s, former head of archives and special collections at Ball State University, and later director of the Center for the Study of Democratic Institutions at the Davidson Library, University of California, Santa Barbara. His archives form the Tambo Nigerian History Collection at U.C. Santa Barbara.

== Early life and family ==
Tambo worked as a volunteer for the Peace Corps in Bauchi, Nigeria, from 1968 to 1970. He received his M.A. degree from the University of Wisconsin in 1974.

He married Shirley.

== Career ==
From 1975 to 1976, Tambo undertook doctoral (uncompleted) fieldwork on the economic history of Nigeria, in Vom, researching the interaction between the Jos Plateau people and the Sokoto Caliphate in the pre-colonial period. In the early 1980s he was part of the Plateau History Project, contributing to its oral history series. He was head of archives and special collections at Ball State University. Later he was director of the Center for the Study of Democratic Institutions at the Davidson Library, University of California Santa Barbara.

== Archives ==
Tambo's archives of his visits to Nigeria for the Peace Corps and as an academic researcher are the subject of the Tambo Nigerian History Collection of the University of California, Santa Barbara where they are held in 7 cartons, 3 document boxes, and 104 audio cassettes, along with digital files. They were donated by Tambo in 2011–2013.

== Selected publications ==
- "The Sokoto Caliphate Slave Trade in the Nineteenth Century", The International Journal of African Historical Studies, Vol. 9, No. 2 (1976), pp. 187–217.
- "Pre-colonial Iron Working on the Jos Plateau", in Papers of the Seminar on the Economic History of the Central Savanna of West Africa. Abdullahi Bayao University College, Ahmadu Bello University, Kano, [1976].
- "The "Hill Refuges" of the Jos Plateau: A Historiographical Examination", History in Africa, Vol. 5 (1978), pp. 201–223.
- "Review: African Historical Dictionaries in Perspective", ASA Review of Books, Vol. 6 (1980), pp. 199–209. doi:10.2307/532665
- Jos Oral History and Literature Texts: Two early rains 1981. [Jos, Nigeria], Plateau History Project, [1981]. (Edited with Elizabeth Allo Isichei)
- Jos Oral History and Literature Texts: Vol. 2. Department of History, University of Jos, 1981. (Edited with Elizabeth Allo Isichei)
- Middletown: An Annotated Bibliography. Garland, New York, 1988. (With John D. Hewitt & Dwight W. Hoover) ISBN 0824058399
- A Guide to the Center for the Study of Democratic Institutions Collection. Dept. of Special Collections, Davidson Library, University of California, Santa Barbara, 1996. (With Deborah Kennedy)
