= International trade in fine art =

The international trade of fine art is most precisely defined as the trade across nations of unique, non-reproducible works by an artist. The art trade contradicts typical international trade models since it is a culturally significant good. It is not treated by consumers the same way any other commodity would because of the aesthetic value that is unique to each piece. Despite existing as a finite physical piece, unique art is still considered intellectual property. This sparks the debate as to whether art exports should be restricted for nationalistic and cultural reasons, or liberalized for the sake of a healthier international market.

== Decorative art as a trade commodity ==
The trade commodities included in the definition of "visual art" include the following: painting, drawing, sculpture in various materials, printmaking, photography, maps, performance art, installation art, mail art, assemblage art, textile arts, fashion design, video art, digital art, and product design. These works are non-functional, emotional, social, political, traditional, and cultural statements, and in comparison to other goods, are not greatly affected by commercial-sector constraints. Though visual art is a physical, hand-made good, it is often culturally rooted and created for aesthetic appeal. Therefore, art is considered intellectual property.

The 4-digit Standard International Trade Classification (SITC) classifies "Works of Art, Collectors Pieces and Antiques" under category 8960, which includes paintings, drawings, pastels, original sculptures, original prints, stamps, and antiques over 100 years old. This is the only SITC category that consists of unique, non-reproducible art, which is typically thought of as "fine" art. The 4-digit harmonized commodity description and coding system, otherwise known as the harmonized system (HS) code for "fine" art is 9701, which is classified as "Paintings, Drawings and Pastels, Executed Entirely By Hand".

== History of international art trade ==
The earliest known regulation of cultural property dates to 1464, when Pope Pius II prohibited the exportation of works of art from the Papal States. It was not until the mid-1500s that any sizable amount of formal artwork was transferred between nations in licit markets. Previously, local demand had satisfied the supply of artwork, but it could not keep up as the number of artists increased. Consequently, artists exported their works to foreign markets. Between 1540 and 1670, an average of 144 paintings per year were transported between the Netherlands and New Spain.

Throughout much of the early modern period, if an artist could not domestically sell his art, he sold it instead to dealers who exported the works abroad. Starting in the 17th century, however, most art was traded at the massive auction houses of Christie's and Sotheby's of London, which both still survive today.

Like any other traded good, art has been historically subjected to import duties. For example, in the more enlightened years of the 19th century, art escaped high tariffs in America because the government viewed art as an important cultural good. At other times, though, tariff revenue was considered more important than free intellectual property.

Highlights of Official Treatments of Imported Paintings and Sculpture in the US, 1789–1865
| Year | Duty (%) | Context of change, exemptions |
|---|---|---|
| 1789 | 5 | |
| 1790 | 10 | A general increase in duties was prompted by revenue requirements |
| 1800 | 12.5 | Upward revisions were made to "defray expenses in relation to the Barbary States". |
| 1812 | 30 | Duties were more than doubled to finance the war with Britain |
| 1816 | 15 | Imports of "any society incorporated for philosophical or literary purposes or for the encouragement of the fine arts" were placed on the free list. |
| 1824 | 15 | Protectionist pressures generated advances in duties, overall, but duties on imported art were not changed. |
| 1832 | 0 | Tariff Act of 1832: All paintings and sculpture were placed on the free list. |
| 1841–1842 | 20 | Overall increase in rates was driven by needs of an empty Treasury. Though art duties were re-imposed, the "productions of American artists residing abroad" were added to the free list, along with imports of nonprofit cultural institutions. |
| 1846 | 0 | All paintings entered free when imported as an object of taste and not of merchandise. |
| 1861 | 10 | The requirements of the Civil War finance elevated overall rates. |

During World War II, neutral Switzerland became the primary trafficker of art on the European continent. Most "degenerate" works of art that the Nazi government purged from German museums were sold there, where they largely entered black markets. Since the war ended, there has been a massive, ongoing effort to recover all of these works. For fifteen years following the war, 45,000 pieces were returned to France, mostly to Jewish owners.

Today, almost every country in the world has restrictions and regulations on the export of cultural property. Currently, most art auctions are facilitated on online sites such as eBay and Lauritz.com.

== Economic theory of art trade ==
Fine art proves complicated for economists to analyze, mostly because trade in unique art is in large part trade between consumers – the "secondary market" – rather than the "primary market" trade between the producer (artist) and the consumer. For example, when a museum buys a sculpture from a private collector, the exchange is between two consumers and considered a transaction in the secondary market because neither of them produced the sculpture. It is more complicated for economists, then, to capture these transactions in their data.

Comparative advantage is also more difficult to pinpoint in the case of cultural goods. There is a certain degree of cultural nationalism of art, making some nations reluctant to part with their cultural property. Additionally, relative advantage cannot simply be calculated by the marginal cost of producing a unit of art, since aesthetic value plays so heavily into its price.

Trade theory demonstrates how much and at what price countries trade goods if they have different endowments or different preferences. But this model is not very useful because of retentive nationalism: a country that is relatively less endowed with art-producing resources will not stop producing simply because they can import art from abroad at cheaper prices.

=== Determination of prices ===
Traditional trade theory treats art as a homogeneous, non-differentiated good, which is where it fails to reliably predict trade trends. Unique art is valued precisely because of its uniqueness. Since each piece of art is different, and because each piece does not appear on the market very often, the determination of changes in market value prove difficult to determine.

Economists use the hedonic regression (HR) estimation method to calculate prices in art. This is used to predict prices based on various attributes of the artwork such as its dimensions, the artist, and the subject matter attended to.

== Protectionism vs. Liberalization ==
Protectionism is a nationalistic viewpoint that contends that a healthy cultural industry is necessary to assert national sovereignty and identity. Countries with small domestic markets are often overwhelmed by imports from larger markets in which producers can make up their costs of production by dumping content abroad. America is the largest exporter of artwork in the world, and English speaking countries are especially vulnerable to American imports. Protectionists view this as a modern form of American imperialism, which reduces cultural diversity when national industries are unable to compete.

Protectionism is less concerned with direct economic interest as it is with preserving cultural integrity. Australian economist David Throsby argues that investment in "cultural capital" may be necessary for the sustainability of a culture. Paul M. Bator, who helped negotiate and draft the UNESCO convention on the International Trade of Art, argues that larger countries are responsible for the cultural interests of smaller ones. He explains in The International Trade in Art that "art-rich countries should create tax and other financial and psychological incentives to persuade those with important antiquities and archaeological objects to keep them at home".

Proponents of liberalization in international art markets stress that open markets contribute to efficient production and distribution of cultural products. Reliance on competitive market forces also frees creative individuals from the hindrance of government oversight. Many special characteristics of cultural products – the lack of rivalry in content, economies of scale, and agglomeration economies – enhance the case for opening markets. Protection raises rather than lowers domestic prices, which detracts from consumer welfare.

The "commodification objection" is the reluctance to classify an important cultural good as a simple trade commodity, and is frequently cited by cultural protectionists. Those who advocate openness believe that free-market nations can provide the most effective political force for development of an active market. This argument diametrically opposes Bator's: free-trade advocates contend that large countries are better suited to help smaller nations finance organization of their cultural resources for more effective participation in international trade.

The issue of the illicit art trade also factors into the debate. In terms of value transferred, the illegal trafficking of art ranks in black market activities second only to narcotics. More problematic than the actual theft of the work is its subsequent transport, which proves difficult to prosecute since most paintings are easily concealable. By maintaining an open market, liberalists argue that much of the illicit trade of art can be eliminated.

== Largest countries by total trade in art ==
The following tables list the top world import/export values, according to data from the UN Comtrade database using SITC code 8960. The sums here are greater than those included in HS 9701 (works done exclusively by hand) because the SITC classification includes works such as antiques, stamps, and sculpture that are not captured in the HS definition.

Top World Importers in 2010
| Country | Trade Value |
|---|---|
| United States | 6,201,785,637 |
| United Kingdom | 4,214,309,059 |
| Switzerland | 1,656,723,908 |
| China, Hong Kong SAR | 782,230,445 |
| France | 562,109,395 |
| Other Reporters | 2,881,571,576 |
| Total Import | 16,298,730,020 |

Top World Exporters in 2010
| Country | Trade Value |
|---|---|
| United States | 6,344,171,701 |
| United Kingdom | 5,178,104,954 |
| Switzerland | 1,229,904,687 |
| France | 959,773,572 |
| Germany | 860,247,165 |
| Other Reporters | 2,332,793,409 |
| Total Export | 16,974,995,488 |

=== Largest exporters and importers of art to and from the USA ===
The United States both imports and exports the greatest value of art. The following tables use data from HS code 9701 code to rank the USA's biggest trading partners in art.

US Imports for 2010
| Country | In 1,000 Dollars |
|---|---|
| Switzerland | 1,506,184 |
| United Kingdom | 1,352,289 |
| France | 464,676 |
| Germany | 169,477 |
| Hong Kong | 156,220 |
| Korea | 137,229 |
| Belgium | 119,128 |
| Netherlands | 92,760 |
| Italy | 91,026 |
| Japan | 90,403 |
| Singapore | 88,400 |
| Luxembourg | 84,147 |
| Canada | 67,124 |
| Austria | 42,508 |
| Spain | 39,760 |
| Subtotal | 4,501,332 |
| All Other | 259,030 |
| Total | 4,760,362 |

US Exports for 2010
| Country | In 1,000 Dollars |
|---|---|
| France | 1,543,510 |
| United Kingdom | 705,964 |
| Italy | 416,948 |
| Germany | 326,409 |
| Spain | 183,255 |
| Netherlands | 171,125 |
| Switzerland | 164,926 |
| Belgium | 133,960 |
| China | 67,193 |
| Austria | 63,497 |
| Norway | 46,164 |
| Japan | 43,445 |
| Mexico | 42,433 |
| Canada | 30,494 |
| Hong Kong | 26,086 |
| Subtotal | 3,965,309 |
| All Other | 213,808 |
| Total | 4,179,117 |

== See also ==
- Antiquities trade
- Black market
- Fine Art Trade Guild
