= List of Scarecrow Press historical dictionaries =

This is a list of Scarecrow Press historical dictionaries.

== Africa ==
Titles for Africa are:

- 1. Cameroon, by Victor T. Le Vine and Roger P. Nye. 1974. See No. 48.
- 2. The Congo, 2nd ed., by Virginia Thompson and Richard Adloff. 1984. See No. 69.
- 3. Swaziland, by John J. Grotpeter. 1975.
- 4. The Gambia, 2nd ed., by Harry A. Gailey. 1987. See No. 79.
- 5. Botswana, by Richard P. Stevens. 1975. See No. 44.
- 6. Somalia, by Margaret F. Castagno. 1975. See No. 87.
- 7. Benin (Dahomey), 2nd ed., by Samuel Decalo. 1987. See No. 61.
- 8. Burundi, by Warren Weinstein. 1976. See No. 73.
- 9. Togo, 3rd ed., by Samuel Decalo. 1996.
- 10. Lesotho, by Gordon Haliburton. 1977. See No. 90.
- 11. Mali, 3rd ed., by Pascal James Imperato. 1996. See No. 107.
- 12. Sierra Leone, by Cyril Patrick Foray. 1977.
- 13. Chad, 3rd ed., by Samuel Decalo. 1997.
- 14. Upper Volta, by Daniel Miles McFarland. 1978.
- 15. Tanzania, by Laura S. Kurtz. 1978.
- 16. Guinea, 3rd ed., by Thomas O’Toole with Ibrahima Bah-Lalya. 1995. See No. 94.
- 17. Sudan, by John Voll. 1978. See No. 53.
- 18. Rhodesia/Zimbabwe, by R. Kent Rasmussen. 1979. See No. 46.
- 19. Zambia, 2nd ed., by John J. Grotpeter, Brian V. Siegel, and James R. Pletcher. 1998. See No. 106.
- 20. Niger, 3rd ed., by Samuel Decalo. 1997.
- 21. Equatorial Guinea, 3rd ed., by Max Liniger-Goumaz. 2000.
- 22. Guinea-Bissau, 3rd ed., by Richard Lobban and Peter Mendy. 1997.
- 23. Senegal, by Lucie G. Colvin. 1981. See No. 65.
- 24. Morocco, by William Spencer. 1980. See No. 71.
- 25. Malawi, by Cynthia A. Crosby. 1980. See No. 54.
- 26. Angola, by Phyllis Martin. 1980. See No. 92.
- 27. The Central African Republic, by Pierre Kalck. 1980. See No. 51.
- 28. Algeria, by Alf Andrew Heggoy. 1981. See No. 66.
- 29. Kenya, by Bethwell A. Ogot. 1981. See No. 77.
- 30. Gabon, by David E. Gardinier. 1981. See No. 58.
- 31. Mauritania, by Alfred G. Gerteiny. 1981. See No. 68.
- 32. Ethiopia, by Chris Prouty and Eugene Rosenfeld. 1981. See No. 91.
- 33. Libya, 3rd ed., by Ronald Bruce St. John. 1998. See No. 100.
- 34. Mauritius, by Lindsay Riviere. 1982. See No. 49.
- 35. Western Sahara, by Tony Hodges. 1982. See No. 55.
- 36. Egypt, by Joan Wucher King. 1984. See No. 89.
- 37. South Africa, by Christopher Saunders. 1983. See No. 78.
- 38. Liberia, by D. Elwood Dunn and Svend E. Holsoe. 1985. See No. 83.
- 39. Ghana, by Daniel Miles McFarland. 1985. See No. 63.
- 40. Nigeria, 2nd ed., by Anthony Oyewole and John Lucas. 2000.
- 41. Côte d'Ivoire (The Ivory Coast), 2nd ed., by Robert J. Mundt. 1995.
- 42. Cape Verde, 2nd ed., by Richard Lobban and Marilyn Halter. 1988. See No. 62.
- 43. Zaire, by F. Scott Bobb. 1988. See No. 76.
- 44. Botswana, 2nd ed., by Fred Morton, Andrew Murray, and Jeff Ramsay. 1989. See No. 70.
- 45. Tunisia, 2nd ed., by Kenneth J. Perkins. 1997.
- 46. Zimbabwe, 2nd ed., by Steven C. Rubert and R. Kent Rasmussen. 1990. See No. 86.
- 47. Mozambique, by Mario Azevedo. 1991. See No. 88.
- 48. Cameroon, 2nd ed., by Mark W. DeLancey and H. Mbella Mokeba. 1990.
- 49. Mauritius, 2nd ed., by Sydney Selvon. 1991.
- 50. Madagascar, by Maureen Covell. 1995. See No. 98.
- 51. The Central African Republic, 2nd ed., by Pierre Kalck, translated by Thomas O’Toole. 1992. See No. 93.
- 52. Angola, 2nd ed., by Susan H. Broadhead. 1992. See No. 92.
- 53. Sudan, 2nd ed., by Carolyn Fluehr-Lobban, Richard A. Lobban Jr., and John Obert Voll. 1992. See No. 85.
- 54. Malawi, 2nd ed., by Cynthia A. Crosby. 1993. See No. 84.
- 55. Western Sahara, 2nd ed., by Anthony Pazzanita and Tony Hodges. 1994. See No. 96.
- 56. Ethiopia and Eritrea, 2nd ed., by Chris Prouty and Eugene Rosenfeld. 1994. See No. 91.
- 57. Namibia, by John J. Grotpeter. 1994.
- 58. Gabon, 2nd ed., by David E. Gardinier. 1994. See No. 101.
- 59. Comoro Islands, by Martin Ottenheimer and Harriet Ottenheimer. 1994.
- 60. Rwanda, by Learthen Dorsey. 1994. See No. 105.
- 61. Benin, 3rd ed., by Samuel Decalo. 1995.
- 62. Republic of Cape Verde, 3rd ed., by Richard Lobban and Marlene Lopes. 1995. See No. 104.
- 63. Ghana, 2nd ed., by David Owusu-Ansah and Daniel Miles Mc-Farland. 1995. See No. 97.
- 64. Uganda, by M. Louise Pirouet. 1995.
- 65. Senegal, 2nd ed., by Andrew F. Clark and Lucie Colvin Phillips. 1994.
- 66. Algeria, 2nd ed., by Phillip Chiviges Naylor and Alf Andrew Heggoy. 1994. See No. 102.
- 67. Egypt, 2nd ed., by Arthur Goldschmidt Jr. 1994. See No. 89.
- 68. Mauritania, 2nd ed., by Anthony G. Pazzanita. 1996.
- 69. Congo, 3rd ed., by Samuel Decalo, Virginia Thompson, and Richard Adloff. 1996.
- 70. Botswana, 3rd ed., by Jeff Ramsay, Barry Morton, and Fred Morton. 1996. See No. 108.
- 71. Morocco, 2nd ed., by Thomas K. Park. 1996. See No. 95.
- 72. Tanzania, 2nd ed., by Thomas P. Ofcansky and Rodger Yeager. 1997.
- 73. Burundi, 2nd ed., by Ellen K. Eggers. 1997. See No. 103.
- 74. Burkina Faso, 2nd ed., by Daniel Miles McFarland and Lawrence Rupley. 1998.
- 75. Eritrea, by Tom Killion. 1998.
- 76. Democratic Republic of the Congo (Zaire), by F. Scott Bobb. 1999. (Revised edition of Historical Dictionary of Zaire, No. 43)
- 77. Kenya, 2nd ed., by Robert M. Maxon and Thomas P. Ofcansky. 2000.
- 78. South Africa, 2nd ed., by Christopher Saunders and Nicholas Southey. 2000.
- 79. The Gambia, 3rd ed., by Arnold Hughes and Harry A. Gailey. 1999.
- 80. Swaziland, 2nd ed., by Alan R. Booth. 2000.
- 81. Republic of Cameroon, 3rd ed., by Mark W. DeLancey and Mark Dike DeLancey. 2000.
- 82. Djibouti, by Daoud A. Alwan and Yohanis Mibrathu. 2000.
- 83. Liberia, 2nd ed., by D. Elwood Dunn, Amos J. Beyan, and Carl Patrick Burrowes. 2001.
- 84. Malawi, 3rd ed., by Owen J. Kalinga and Cynthia A. Crosby. 2001.
- 85. Sudan, 3rd ed., by Richard A. Lobban Jr., Robert S. Kramer, and Carolyn Fluehr-Lobban. 2002.
- 86. Zimbabwe, 3rd ed., by Steven C. Rubert and R. Kent Rasmussen. 2001.
- 87. Somalia, 2nd ed., by Mohamed Haji Mukhtar. 2002.
- 88. Mozambique, 2nd ed., by Mario Azevedo, Emmanuel Nnadozie, and Tomé Mbuia João. 2003.
- 89. Egypt, 3rd ed., by Arthur Goldschmidt Jr. and Robert Johnston. 2003.
- 90. Lesotho, 2nd ed., by Scott Rosenberg, Richard Weisfelder, and Michelle Frisbie-Fulton. 2004.
- 91. Ethiopia, New Edition, by David H. Shinn and Thomas P. Ofcansky. 2004.
- 92. Angola, New Edition, by W. Martin James. 2004.
- 93. Central African Republic, 3rd ed., by Pierre Kalck, translated by Xavier-Samuel Kalck. 2005.
- 94. Guinea, 4th ed., by Thomas O’Toole with Janice E. Baker. 2005.
- 95. Morocco, 2nd ed., by Thomas K. Park and Aomar Boum. 2006.
- 96. Western Sahara, 3rd ed., by Anthony G. Pazzanita. 2005.
- 97. Ghana, 3rd ed., by David Owusu-Ansah. 2005.
- 98. Madagascar, 2nd ed., by Philip M. Allen and Maureen Covell. 2005.
- 99. Sierra Leone, New Edition, by C. Magbaily Fyle. 2005.
- 100. Libya, 4th ed., by Ronald Bruce St John. 2006.
- 101. Gabon, 3rd ed., by David E. Gardinier and Douglas A. Yates 3 2006.
- 102. Algeria, 3rd ed., by Phillip Naylor. 2006.
- 103. Burundi, 3rd ed., by Ellen K. Eggers. 2007.
- 104. Republic of Cape Verde, 4th ed., by Richard A. Lobban Jr. and Paul Khalil Saucier. 2007.
- 105. Rwanda, New Edition, by Aimable Twagilamana. 2007.
- 106. Zambia, 3rd ed., by David J. Simon, James R. Pletcher, and Brian V. Siegel. 2008.
- 107. Mali, 4th ed., by Pascal James Imperato, Gavin H. Imperato, and Austin C. Imperato. 2008.
- 108. Botswana, 4th ed., by Fred Morton, Jeff Ramsay, and Part Themba Mgadla. 2008.
