= Teo Spiller =

Slovenian digital artist (born 1965)

Teo Spiller (born December 4, 1965, in Ljubljana) is a Slovenian digital artist who has been active in the net.art movement since 1995. Spiller is notable for being one of the first artists to sell a piece of Internet art to a museum or collector. As of March 2018 he was an assistant professor at Arthouse College in Ljubljana.

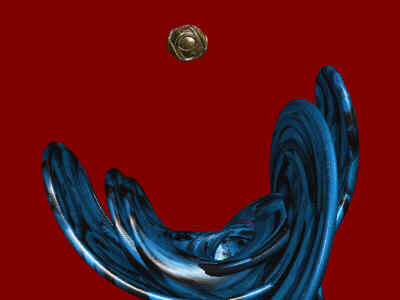
Teo Spiller: From Binary to Organic, (1997)

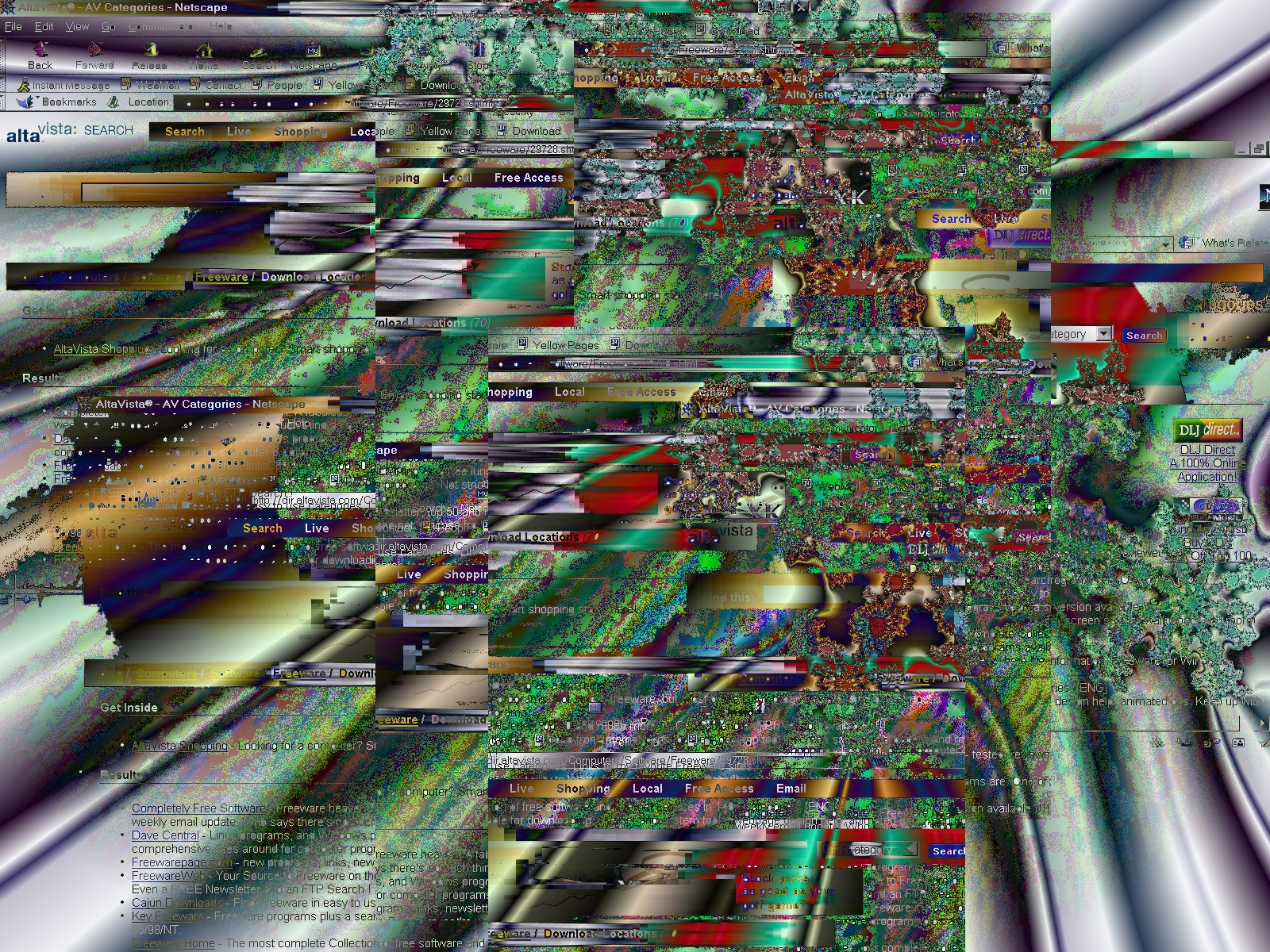
Teo Spiller, Cyber Graphic (2000). Collection of Municipal Museum of Győr, Hungary

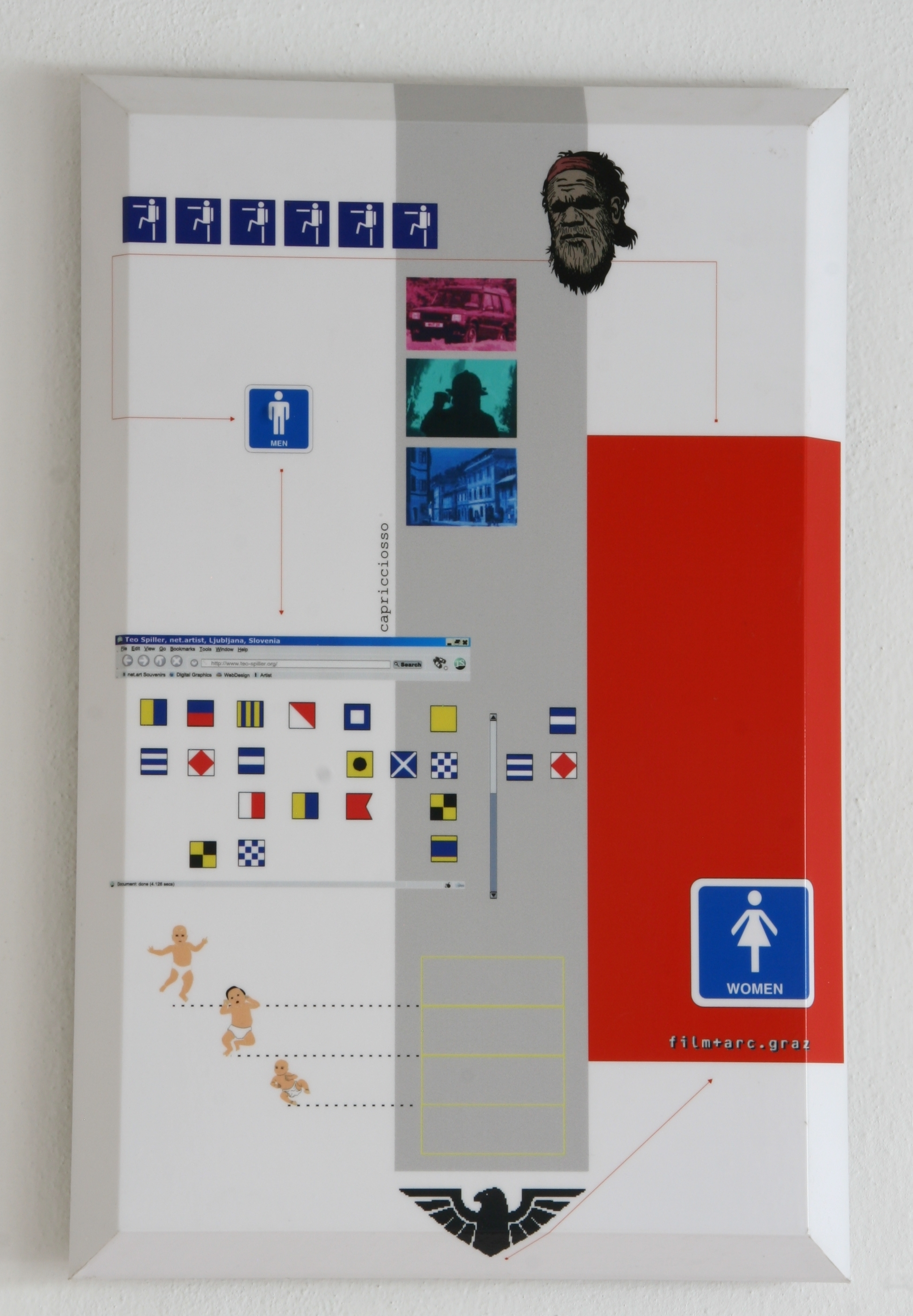
Teo Spiller: Tangible net.art - Capricces for Netscape (2003)

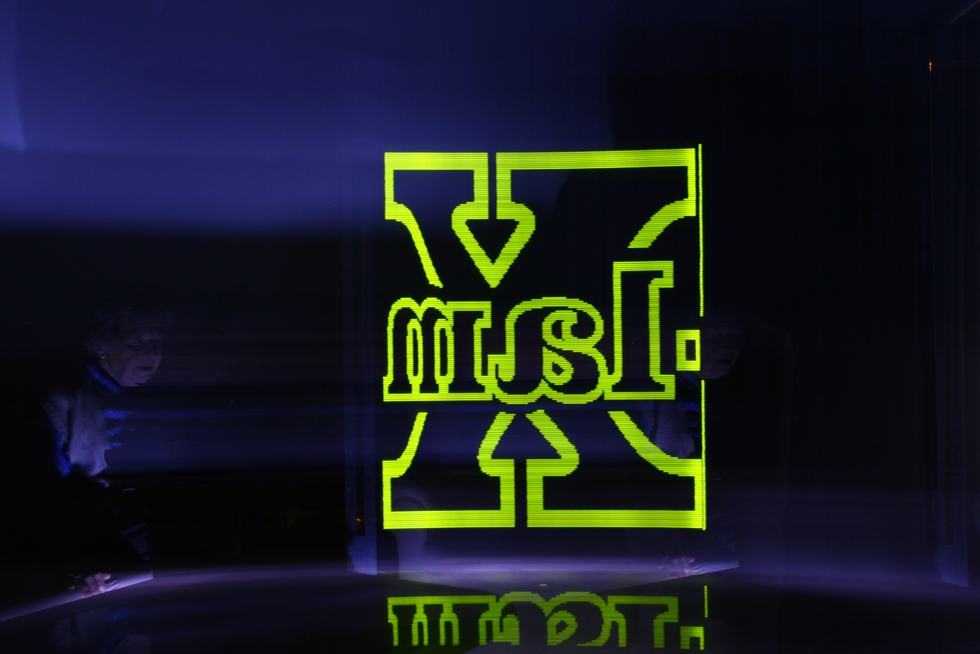
Tadej Komavec, Teo Spiller: X-lam (2004)

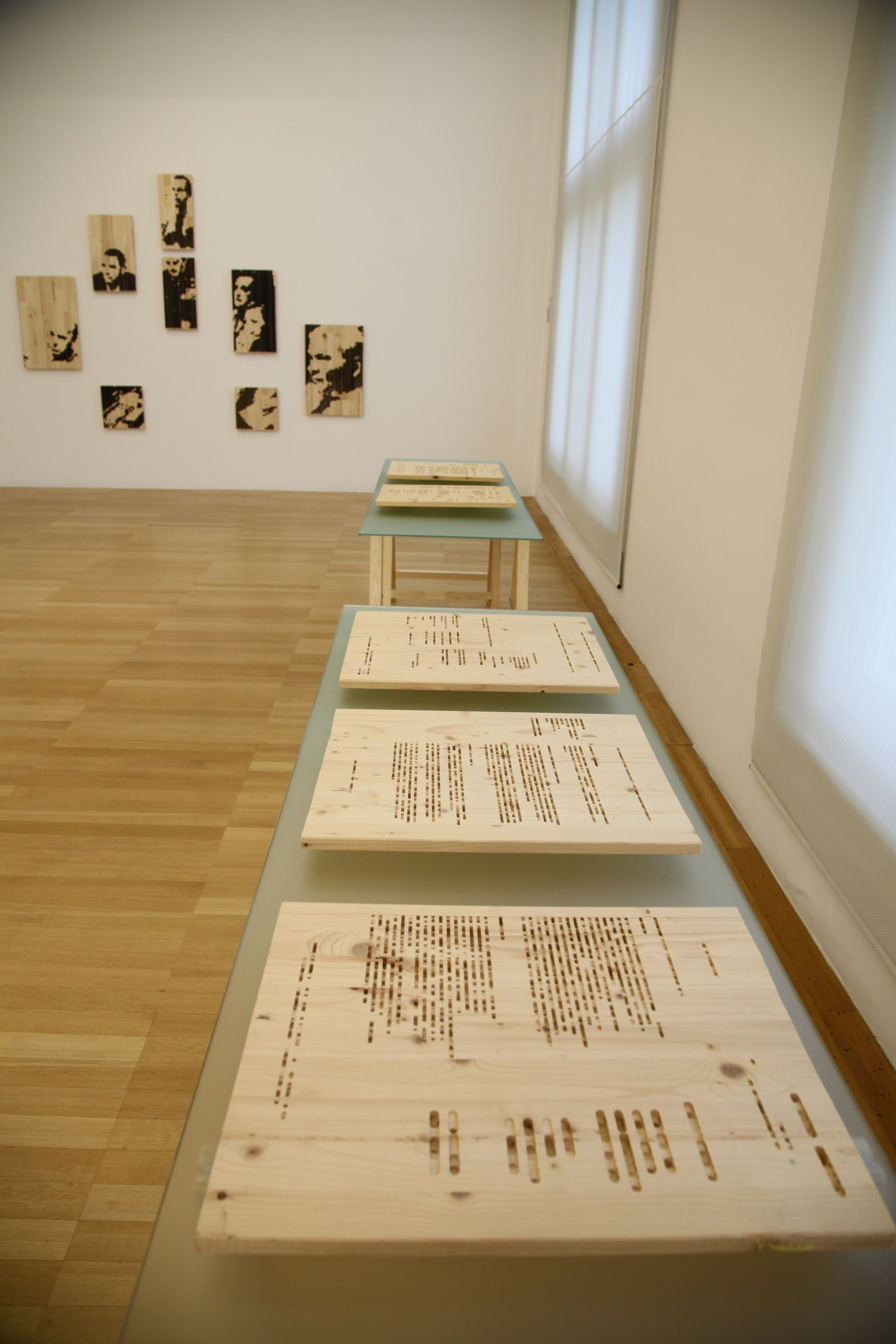
Teo Spiller: In/Form/Aation (2011) & President Obama following execution of Osama bin Laden (2013). 30th Ljubljana Biennial of Graphic Arts

== net.art Career ==
In May 1999 Spiller sold his work Megatronix to Mestna galerija Ljubljana for approximately US$500. This made Spiller one of the first net.art artists to sell a piece to a gallery or collector. Sale negotiations between Spiller and the buyer were conducted through the use of an open online forum. His other notable net.art projects include Hommage to Mondrian, Nice Page, Caprices for Netscape and Esmeralda.

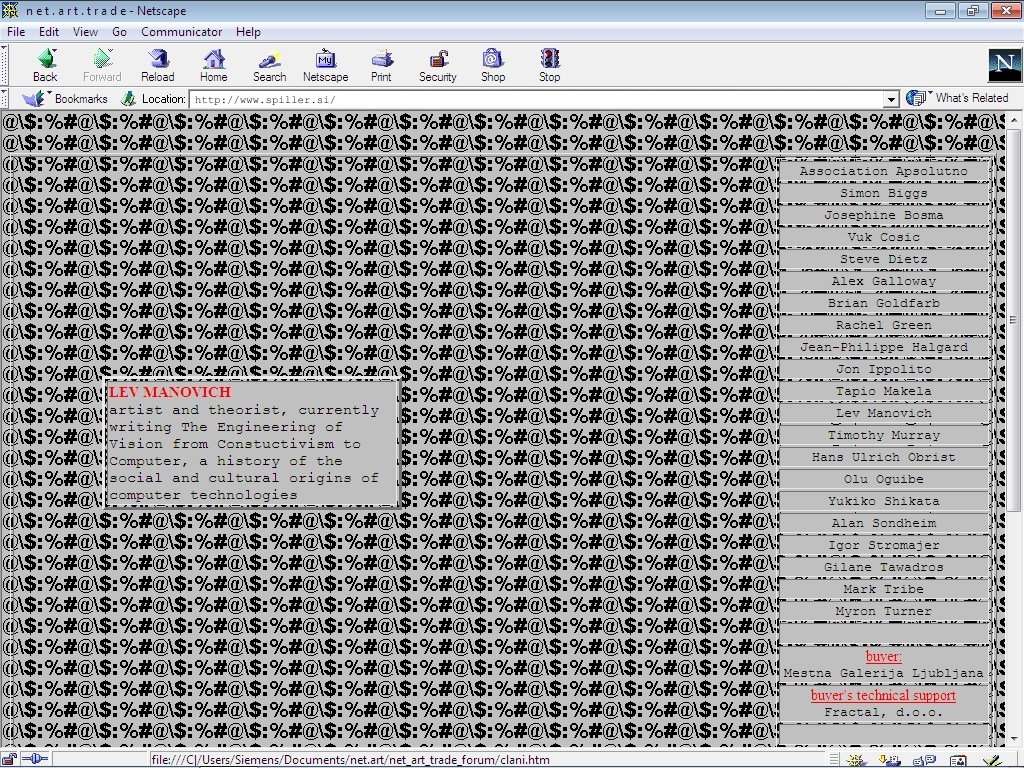
Teo Spiller net.art.trade (net.art)

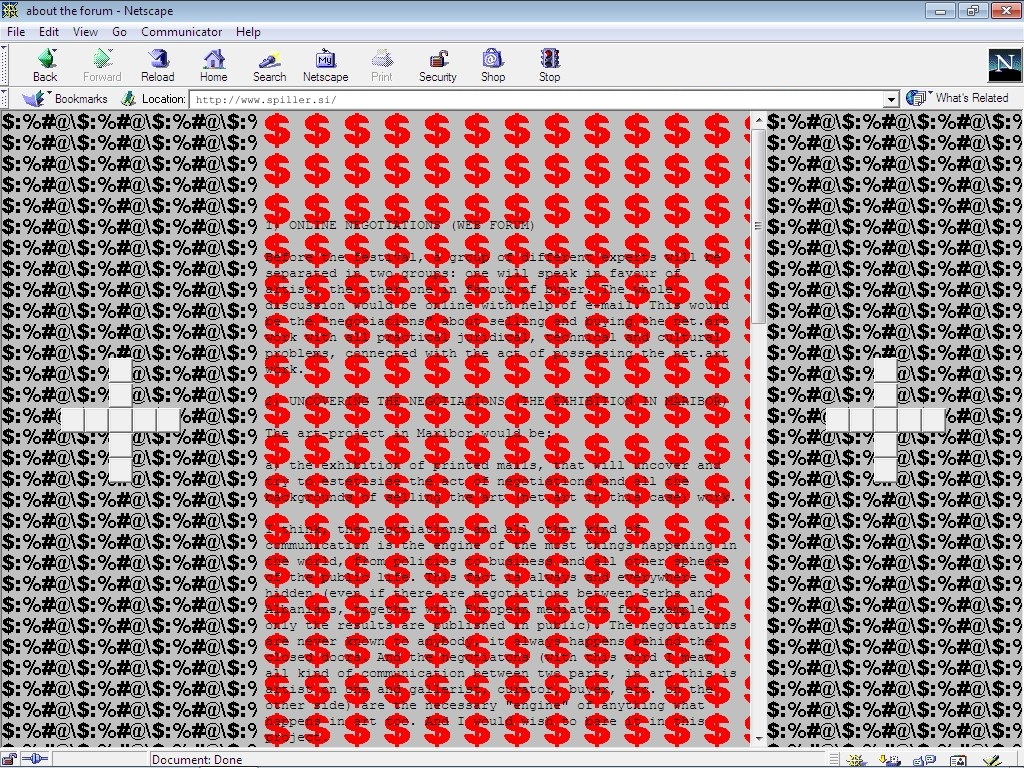
Teo Spiller net.art.trade (net.art) 2

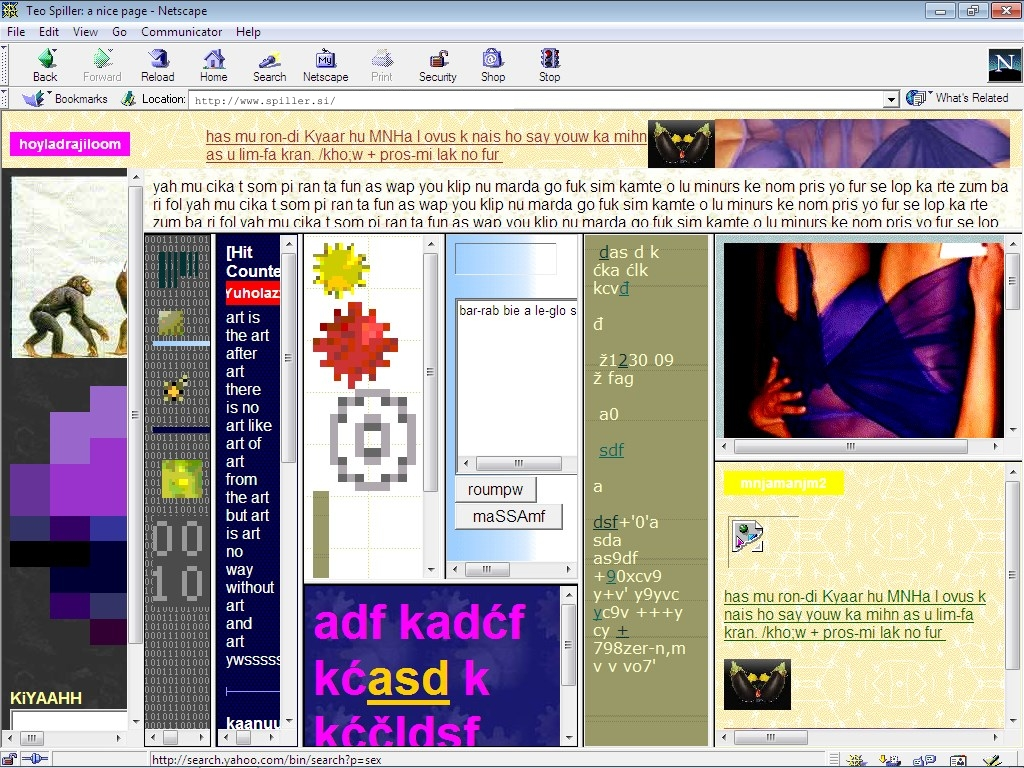
Teo Spiller Nice Page (net.art)

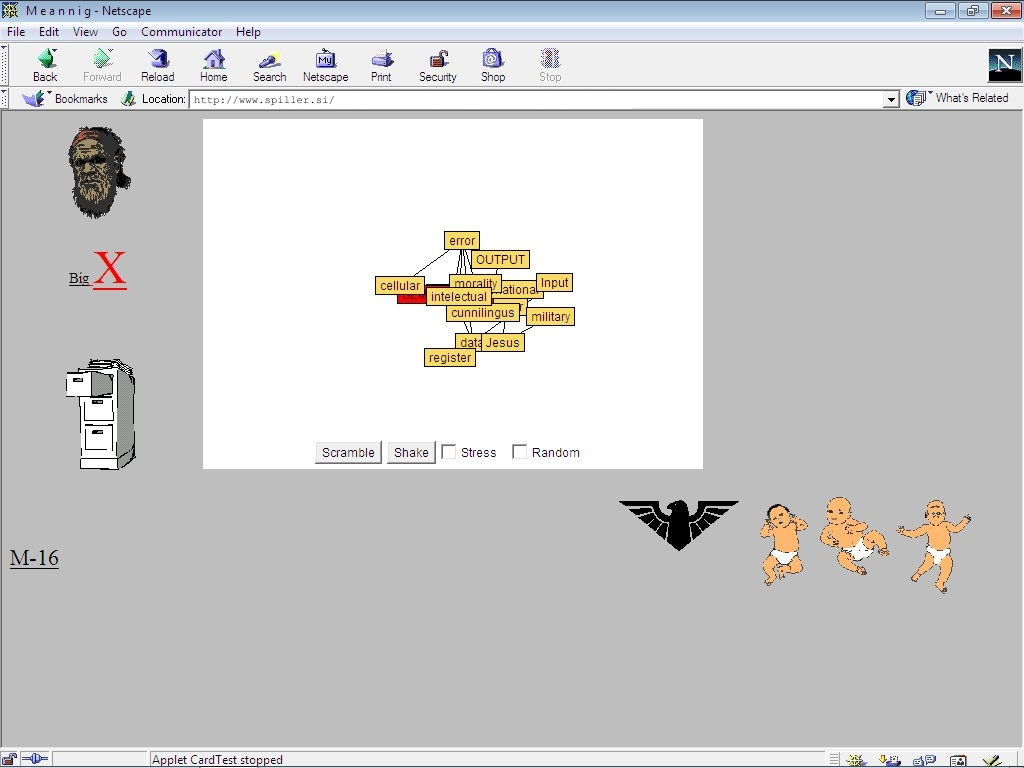
Teo Spiller Capriccess for Netscape (net.art)

In 2000 Spiller organized an international art event called INFOS 2000. This was an offline net.art contest addressing how new multimedia has contextually and aesthetically obscured the borders between net.art and CD-ROM art. He also produced many fine art works reflecting the aesthetics of new media.

In 2004 Spiller launched X-lam, a different media for viewing images, in collaboration with Tadej Komavec. It works best in low-light conditions. A 'stick' contains a series of blinking diodes; by moving the eyes quickly the viewer can briefly see an image floating in open space. Spiller exhibited X-lam at the 10th Cairo International Biennale, alongside other viewing technologies like stereograms and streaming textuality, which he later used in the installation Intruders (Kino Siska, 2012).

In 2007 Spiller declined to participate in the U3 Triennial of Contemporary Arts due to conflicting ideas concerning the presentation of net.art in a gallery.

In 2008 Spiller launched Real3Dfriend, a project that questions the ethics of virtual-reality worlds such as Second Life and critiques virtual-reality systems for being too commercial and lacking basis in humanist values.

In 2011 Spiller launched projects in new media textuality and new media semiotics, which combined the artist's writing with net.art projects like SPAM sonnet and news sonnets.

Combining visual media and machinery, Spiller built the robot Laboro to explore the concept of cyborg artistry (a combination of human and machinery within the artistic process). This resulted in "Wooden In/Form/Ations" and robot-generated graphics such as President Obama following the execution of Osama bin Laden.

== Solo exhibitions ==
- Galerija Commerce, Ljubljana, Slovenia
- Klub Cankarjev dom, Ljubljana, Slovenia
- Gallery Rael Artel, Pärnu, Estonia
- INFOS 2000 (off-line) net.art contest
- Installation "Inside the web server", Hevreka!05, Ljubljana, Slovenia, 2005
- "Sshh!", KUD France Prešeren, Ljubljana, Slovenia, 2010
- "Wooden In/form/Ation", Trubar Literature House, Ljubljana, Slovenia, 2011
- "LIFE", Merlin Theatre, Budapest, Hungary, 2011
- "Intruders", Kino Šiška, Ljubljana, Slovenia, 2012

== Group exhibitions ==
- film+arc, Graz; Austria, 1997
- Ostranenie 97, Dessau, Germany, 1997
- Digital Graphic Art on Paper, Ljubljana Municipal Museum, 1999
- Masters of Graphic Arts, Győr, Hungary, 2001
- Break 2.3, Ljubljana, Slovenia, 2005
- Territories, Identities, Nets, Museum of Modern Art, Ljubljana, Slovenia, 2005
- Device-art 2006, Kontejner Zagreb/Blasthaus San Francisco, 2006, Croatia/US
- 10th Cairo International Biennale, Cairo, Egypt, 2006/2007
- Kiparstvo danes, Celje, Slovenia, 2010
- Interruption - 30th Ljubljana Biennial of Graphic art, Ljubljana, 2013
