= ArtTactic =

Art market research firm

ArtTactic is an art market research firm based in London founded by Anders Petterson in 2001. The company uses techniques similar to those used in the financial markets to analyze the art market and build up art market trends. Their services include market sector reports for both art mediums such as photography and regional sectors such as China, auction analysis, artist reports, and the ArtTactic confidence reports, which are surveys of the leading art market players and their sentiments and confidence towards individual artists and different segments of the art market. There are confidence reports for US & Europe, China, India and South Asia.

== History ==
ArtTactic was founded in London by Anders Petterson in 2001. In 2004, ArtTactic organized Art Market Forum in conjunction with Frieze Art Fair and Zoo Art Fair in London. Later that year, Petterson began lecturing on art as an asset class at Sotheby's Institute of Art in London. The following year, ArtTactic launched its first Art Market Confidence Survey for the US & European art market. In 2006, ArtTactic published an Artist Analysis Report on contemporary artist Richard Prince, following a successful report on Damien Hirst. Two years later, ArtTactic published its first Indian Art Market report, presenting its findings at Art Dubai. In 2009, ArtTactic launched its weekly podcasts, hosted by Adam Green. In 2011, ArtTactic published an Artist Analysis Report on Andy Warhol, which was presented in New York during the inaugural Artelligence Conference and the first edition of the Art & Finance Report, a co-production between Deloitte and ArtTactic. The next year, ArtTactic authored the first edition of the Hiscox Online Art Trade Report. In 2013, ArtTactic published an in-depth, updated Artist Analysis Report on the Damien Hirst market. Also that year, ArtTactic launches ArtForecaster and organizes its first public online forecasting competition. Two years afterwards, ArtTactic's Art Market Outlook warns that the art market could start to cool. In 2016, ArtTactic began publishing ArtTactic Rawfacts, a weekly, monthly and quarterly report on auctions performances at Christie's, Sotheby's and Phillips, in addition to launching its first online course on Big Data and the Art Market. In 2017, ArtTactic published its inaugural South Asian Art Market Report in partnership with Rawlinson & Hunter, Constantine Cannon, Gurr Johns and W/R/B Underwriting.

== ArtTactic Podcast ==
In 2009, ArtTactic launched the ArtTactic Podcast, a weekly podcast hosted by Adam Green. The podcast features in-depth interviews with leading art market figures, focusing on topics such as art market analysis, art auctions, art investment funds, art fairs and art financing. Past guests include Simon de Pury, Richard Polsky, Howard Rachofsky and Matthew Slotover.

== Art & Finance Report ==
In 2011, ArtTactic began publishing the Art & Finance Report, alongside Deloitte Luxembourg, an annual report that assesses the developments in the art and finance industry.

== Online Art Trade Report ==
In 2013, ArtTactic launched the Online Art Trade Report, in collaboration with Hiscox, an annual report that analyzes several trends and aspects of the emerging online art market.

== ArtTactic Forecaster ==
In 2014, ArtTactic introduced the ArtTactic Forecaster, an online platform that enables art market enthusiasts and professionals to compete against one another in predicting sales results for artworks upcoming at auction. In addition to a year-long competition, tournaments occur throughout the year surrounding major auction weeks in which top performing players earn awards such as art by contemporary artists including Damien Hirst and art market themed books. Players may compete in the Expert or Rookie League based on their past performance as well as their experience within the art world.
