= Art dealer =

Person that buys and sells works of art

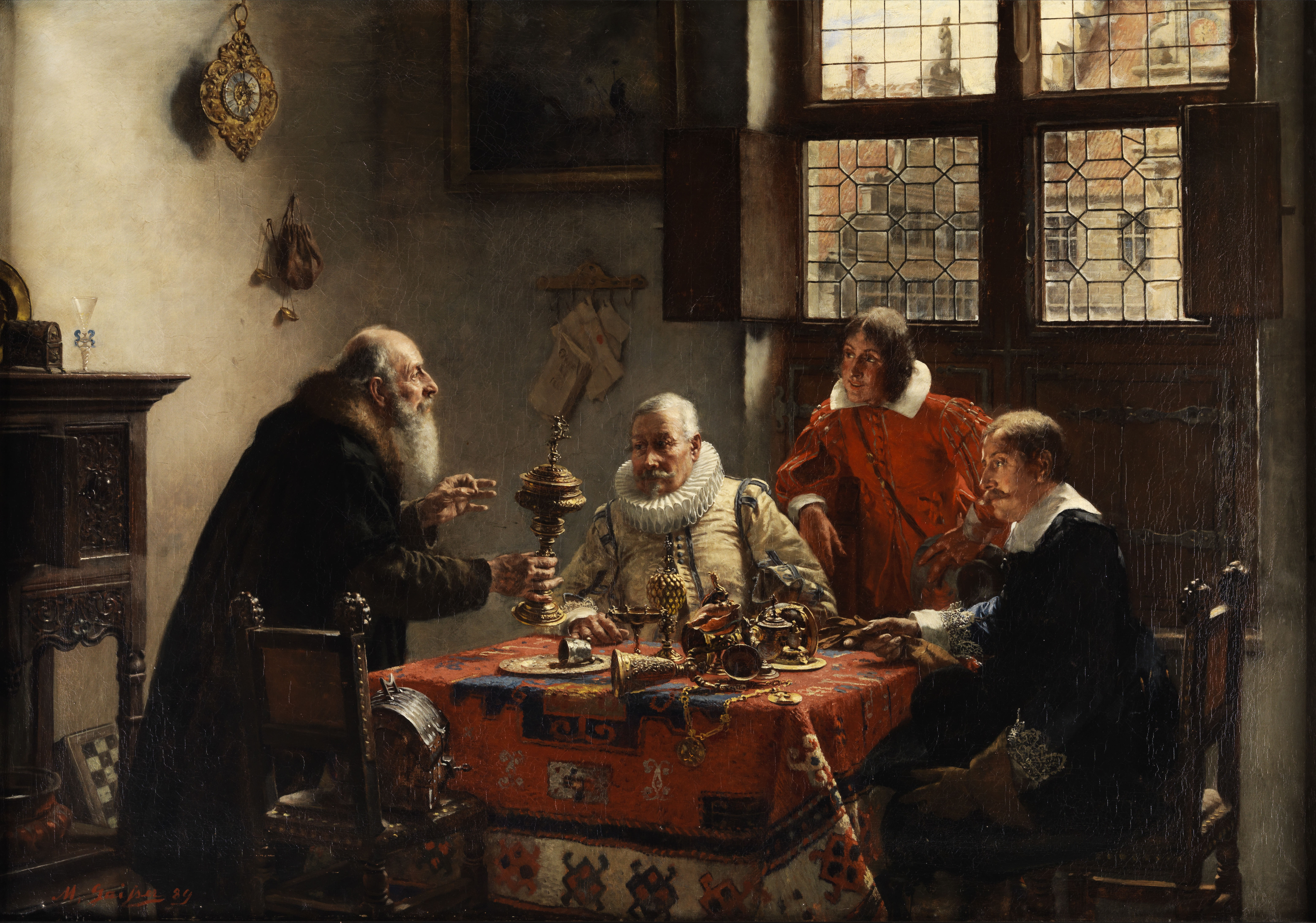
At the art dealer by Max Gaisser, 1889

An art dealer is a person or company that buys and sells works of art, or acts as the intermediary between the buyers and sellers of art.

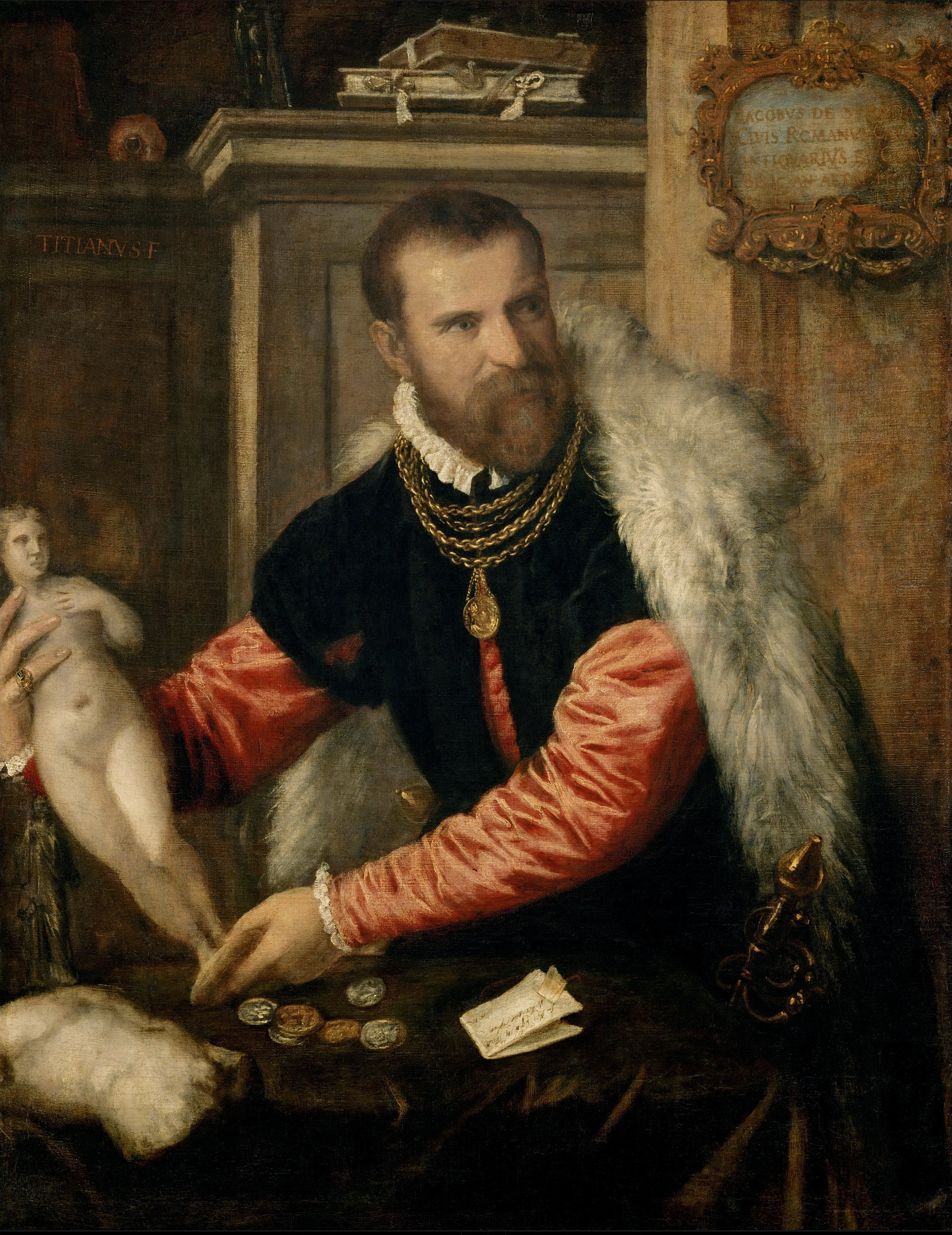
Portrait of Jacopo Strada by Titian, 1567

An art dealer in contemporary art typically seeks out various artists to represent, and builds relationships with collectors and museums whose interests are likely to match the work of the represented artists. Some dealers are able to anticipate market trends, while some prominent dealers may be able to influence the taste of the market. Many dealers specialize in a particular style, period, or region. They often travel internationally, frequenting exhibitions, auctions, and artists' studios looking for good buys, little-known treasures, and exciting new works. When dealers buy works of art, they resell them either in their galleries or directly to collectors. Those who deal in contemporary art in particular usually exhibit artists' works in their own galleries. They will often take part in preparing the works of art to be revealed or processed.

Art dealers' professional associations serve to set high standards for accreditation or membership and to support art exhibitions and shows.

== History ==
The art dealer as a distinct profession perhaps emerged in the Italian Renaissance, in particular to feed the new appetite among collectors for classical antiquities, including coins. The somewhat disreputable character of Jacopo Strada is often said to be reflected in his portrait by Titian (1567).

== Job requirements ==
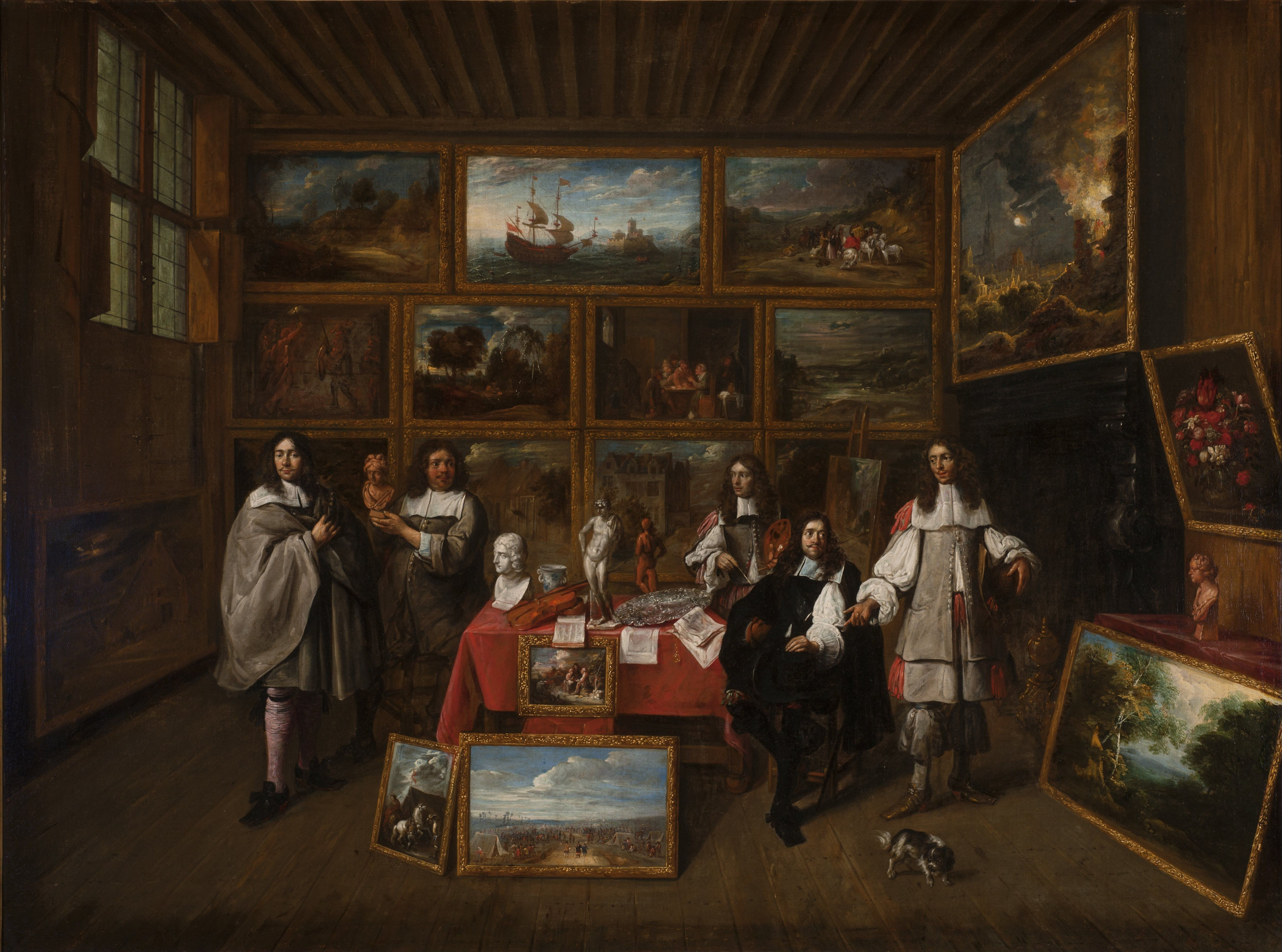
A Picture Gallery by Gillis van Tilborch, 1660s

Art dealers often study the history of art before entering on their careers. Related careers that often cross-over include curators of museums and art auction firms are industry-related careers. Gallery owners who do not succeed may seek to work for more successful galleries. Others pursue careers as art critics, academics, curators of museums or auction houses, or practicing artists.

Dealers have to understand the business side of the art world. They keep up with trends in the market and are knowledgeable about the style of art people want to buy. They figure out how much they should pay for a piece and then estimate the resale price. They are also often passionate and knowledgeable about art. Those who deal with contemporary art promote new artists, creating a market for the artists' works and securing financial success for themselves. The art world is subject to economic booms and busts just like any other market. Art dealers must be economically conscious in order to maintain their livelihoods. The mark ups of art work must be carefully monitored. If prices and profits are too large, then investments may be devalued should an overstock or economic downturn occur.

To determine an artwork's value, dealers inspect the objects or paintings closely, and compare the fine details with similar pieces. Some dealers with many years of experience learn to identify unsigned works by examining stylistic features such as brush strokes, color, form. They recognize the styles of different periods and individual artists. Often art dealers are able to distinguish authentic works from forgeries (although even dealers are sometimes fooled).

== Contemporary gallery ==
The term contemporary art gallery refers to a private for-profit commercial gallery. These galleries are found clustered together in large urban centers. Smaller cities are home to at least one gallery, but they may also be found in towns or villages, and remote areas where artists congregate, e.g. the Taos art colony and St Ives, Cornwall.

Contemporary art galleries are often open to the general public without charge; however, some are semi-private. They profit by taking a portion of art sales; twenty-five to fifty per cent is typical. There are also many non-profit or collective galleries. Some galleries in cities like Tokyo charge the artists a flat rate per day, though this is considered distasteful in some international art markets. Galleries often hang solo shows. Curators often create group shows with a message about a certain theme, trend in art, or group of associated artists. Galleries sometimes choose to represent exclusive artists, giving them opportunities for regular shows.

A gallery's definition can also include the artist cooperative or artist-run space, which often (in North America and Western Europe) operates as a space with a more democratic mission and selection process. Such galleries have a board of directors and a volunteer or paid support staff who select and curate shows by committee, or some kind of similar process to choose art often lacking commercial ends.

== Vanity galleries ==
A vanity gallery is an art gallery charging fees from artists to show their work, much like a vanity press does for authors. The shows lack legitimate curation and often include as many artists as possible. Most art professionals are able to identify them on an artist's resume.

== Professional organizations ==
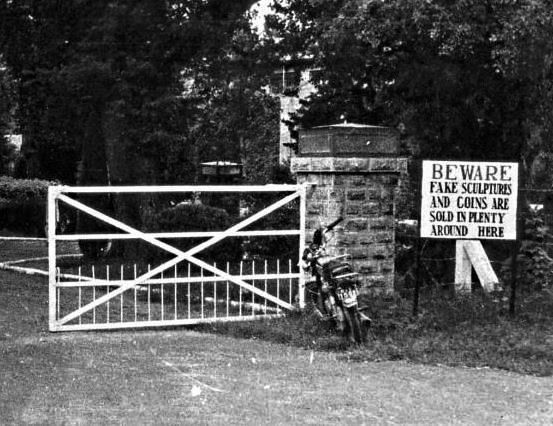
Sign at the Taxila Museum, Pakistan, 1981

- Antique Tribal Art Dealers Association, Inc. (ATADA)
- Art Dealers Association of America (ADAA)
- Art and Antique Dealers League of America (AADLA)
- Association of Art and Antiques Dealers (LAPADA)
- British Art Market Federation (BAMF)
- British Antique Dealers' Association (BADA)
- Confédération Internationale des Négociants en Oeuvres d'Art (CINOA)
- Fine Art Dealers Association (FADA)
- French art dealers committee
- New Art Dealers Alliance (NADA)
- Private Art Dealers Association (PADA)
- Society of London Art Dealers (SLAD)
- The European Fine Art Foundation (TEFAF)

== See also ==
- List of art dealers
- Appraiser
- Art finance
- Art market
- Art sale
- Art valuation
- Auction
- Blockage discount
- Curator
