= Rothko case =

Legal dispute over Mark Rothko's estate

The Rothko case was the protracted legal dispute between Kate Rothko, the daughter of the painter Mark Rothko; the painter's estate executors; and the directors of his gallery, Marlborough Fine Art. The revelations in the case of greed, abuses of power and conspiracy by financial interests in the art world were described by the New York Court of Appeals, the highest court of New York state, as "manifestly wrongful and indeed shocking", serving as a cautionary tale for both artists and their gallerists.

== Summary ==
The entire Rothko matter involved few litigants, but many counsel, some of them with lengthy professional services over a period from 1971 to 1979. Proceedings included removal of the estate's original executors, setting aside the contracts those executors made with the Marlborough gallery, eliminating the rights of the gallery with respect to its inter vivos contracts with the artist, restoring hundreds of paintings to the artist's estate, removal proceedings to compensate the estate for paintings not returnable to it to the extent of millions of dollars, election proceedings litigating the rights of election by the children against an excessive charitable distribution, contents proceedings construing Mark Rothko's will as to the meaning of the "contents" of the family residence willed to his widow and to her estate and later by the widow's will to Rothko's children, and valuation proceedings for valuing the art, assessed costs, fees, and taxes.

== Details ==
On September 16, 1968, Rothko executed a two-page will, drafted by and its execution supervised by his friend Bernard Reis, an unlicensed law-school graduate and Certified Public Accountant, leaving all of his residual estate to the non-profit Rothko Foundation which Rothko organized shortly before his death.

Five months later on February 21, 1969, Rothko entered into an agreement with Marlborough A.G., a Liechtenstein corporation with international galleries, which provided in part that he agreed "not to sell any works of art for a period of eight years, except to Marlborough A.G. if a supplementary contract is made."

One year later Rothko died by suicide on February 25, 1970, leaving an estate consisting primarily but not entirely of 798 of his paintings. Rothko's wife Mary Alice died of a stroke six months after her husband's demise. Rothko's will was admitted to probate the month following his death, naming his estate executors: Bernard Reis, who had drafted Rothko's will and who became a Marlborough Gallery New York director the month before Rothko died; Theodoros Stamos, a friend and fellow artist represented by Marlborough New York starting in 1971; and Morton Levine, an anthropology professor, unconnected with Marlborough but who had been Rothko's son Christopher's guardian for a short time.

Shortly before his death in 1970, Rothko made gifts to his children of certain key paintings in his possession in an effort to provide his children with financial security, since he believed that key patrons would pay higher prices for the works following his death. However, after Rothko died, his children were notified by the Marlborough's founder, Francis Kenneth Lloyd, that under the terms of the agreement made with the gallery in 1966 and renewed in 1969, the gallery owned all of Rothko's paintings.

Mark Rothko, No. 2, Blue Red & Green, 1953, oil on canvas. A section of a painting from Rothko's estate; the painting was among those wrongfully sold by the estate executors to Marlborough A.G. in 1970 very shortly after Rothko's death.

Following Rothko's death the three executors for the estate agreed to sell 100 works to Marlborough for a total of $1,800,000 while a further 698 works were consigned to the gallery for sale at a fixed commission of 50%, however, the executors paid only $200,000 upfront to the estate. In the year after Rothko's death, the value of his work more than doubled while early works were selling at auction for over $80,000.

In 1971 Kate Rothko sued to release the estate from the sale agreement and have the paintings returned to the family. The legal proceedings revealed that when still a struggling artist with a young family, Rothko agreed to a deal with the gallery in which all of his paintings would be sold through the gallery in exchange for a set monthly fee. Such terms were not unheard of, as Pablo Picasso had had a similar deal with his gallery in the 1920s.

It emerged from the proceedings that the estate executors and the gallery defrauded Rothko and his estate through various methods of self-dealing. Among other wrongful acts, the gallery had been filtering payments for Rothko's works through accounts in Switzerland and Liechtenstein as part of an effort to ensure the paintings were undervalued during Rothko's lifetime — in the 1960s this led the artist to vastly underestimate the value of his works, directly resulting in his agreement to consignments of dozens of paintings to the gallery and collectors without appreciating his works' full value.

The trial record revealed that the gallery had been stockpiling the undervalued works instead of selling them in order to ensure both a low market saturation and a high Marlborough inventory, anticipating a heightened value in the market after Rothko's death. Further, the 100 paintings 'sold' after Rothko's death by the estate executors through Marlborough were not sold to bona fide purchasers, but were instead retained by the gallery which shuffled the sale monies through its accounts in Europe, and which then quickly 're-sold' the works to actual purchasers for 5 to 6 times the value declared by the estate. Many works were sold this way by the Marlborough with the complicity of the executors despite the court's injunction against selling any works while the case was unresolved and still before the courts.

Ultimately, certain directors at Marlborough were convicted of defrauding the Rothko family, and in 1975, the court ordered the gallery to pay over $9 million in damages and costs, and also ordered the gallery to return 658 Rothko paintings it still held. Marlborough disputed the return of the paintings and was able to prevail as to those works it had sold during the proceedings in defiance of the court's orders to the contrary. Those works remained in the hands of collectors, including Rothko's 1953 oil on canvas painting, Homage to Matisse, which later sold at public auction for US $22.4 million.

== Valuation issues ==
The courts involved in litigating the Rothko matter were faced with many complex issues as part of and beyond the wrongdoing of the Marlborough group as estate executors. In particular, the valuation of services rendered by counsel were litigated at length; and the valuation of the paintings posed complex questions as their valuation affected nearly every other matter facing the court. In 1979 after much of the matter's litigation had already taken place, the court said:

... [T]he bulk of the estate was and is in the form of hundreds of paintings rather than cash ... and ... [the] Internal Revenue Service may not at an early time complete its final determination with respect to date-of-death estate taxes. The estate is presently resisting a deficiency assessment of large proportions. In litigating that issue there is not only a difference of opinion with respect to the value of the hundreds of paintings in this estate but also whether a blockage discount should be given to the estate and whether a further discount should be available due to the inter vivos contract for an exclusive agency in favor of Marlborough Galleries for seven years after death, and finally whether a discount should be enjoyed by the estate for commissions which must be paid for selling many of the paintings by agents of the estate.

...

[P]revailing counsel have participated in approximately 20,000 pages of transcript of pretrial and trial testimony; thousands of exhibits have been introduced and considered; thousands of pages of briefs have been submitted to this court and to the appellate courts; many decisions were made in this court, pretrial as well as the ultimate disposition; the Appellate Division has ruled on these matters several times; and the Court of Appeals has finally unanimously affirmed the major disposition made in this court, (43 N.Y.2d 305, 401 N.Y.S.2d 449, 372 N.E.2d 291).

== Former estate executors ==
The Internal Revenue Service audited the Rothko Foundation and determined that Mark Rothko's former friend and ex-estate executor Bernard Reis was liable for various self-dealing excise taxes under section 4941 of the Internal Revenue Code of 1954 (IRS code) for the years 1970 through 1974 in the total amount of $18,582,500, and additions to tax under sections 6651 and 6684 for the same years in the respective total amounts of $518,125 and $2,112,500. Reis' estate (he was dead by that time) lost its summary judgment motion to make the ruling go away.

Despite Theodoros Stamos' protestations that he had done nothing wrong, the Tax Court also ruled against him for liability for various self-dealing excise taxes under IRS code section 4941 for the years 1970 through 1976 in the total amount of $19,407,500, and additions to tax under sections 6651(a)(1) and 6684 for the same years in the respective total amounts of $724,375 and $2,957,500. Stamos also lost his appeal.

Marlborough A.G.'s founder Frank Lloyd paid a third of the $9.2 million award to the Rothko children as a fine against Marlborough for violating the court's injunction against the sale of any further paintings before a final ruling or settlement. The disgraced Lloyd is not mentioned as active after 1972 on the gallery history page on Marlborough's website. Lloyd died in 1998 at age 86.

== Legal and financial concepts at issue ==
- Art valuation
- Breach of contract
- Breach of trust
- Warranty of title
- Conflict of interest
- Contempt
- Covenant of good faith and fair dealing
- Damages calculation
- Documentary evidence
- Equitable versus constructive ownership
- Estate contract
- Fiduciary duty
- Fraud
- Injunction
- Inter vivos agreements
- Joint and several liability
- Negligence
- Present value
- Temporary restraining order

== In film ==
Thirteen years after his death, Mark Rothko's tale aired as a television movie: The Rothko Conspiracy, a co-production of the BBC and Lionheart Television. The filmmakers based their work on the 1978 book, The Legacy of Mark Rothko, on interviews and the trial transcripts. In 2021, Rothko, a film adaptation of Seldes' book, was announced, with Sam Taylor-Johnson directing.

== See also ==
- Art dealer
- Art gallery
- Art world economics
