= Art auction =

Sale of art works

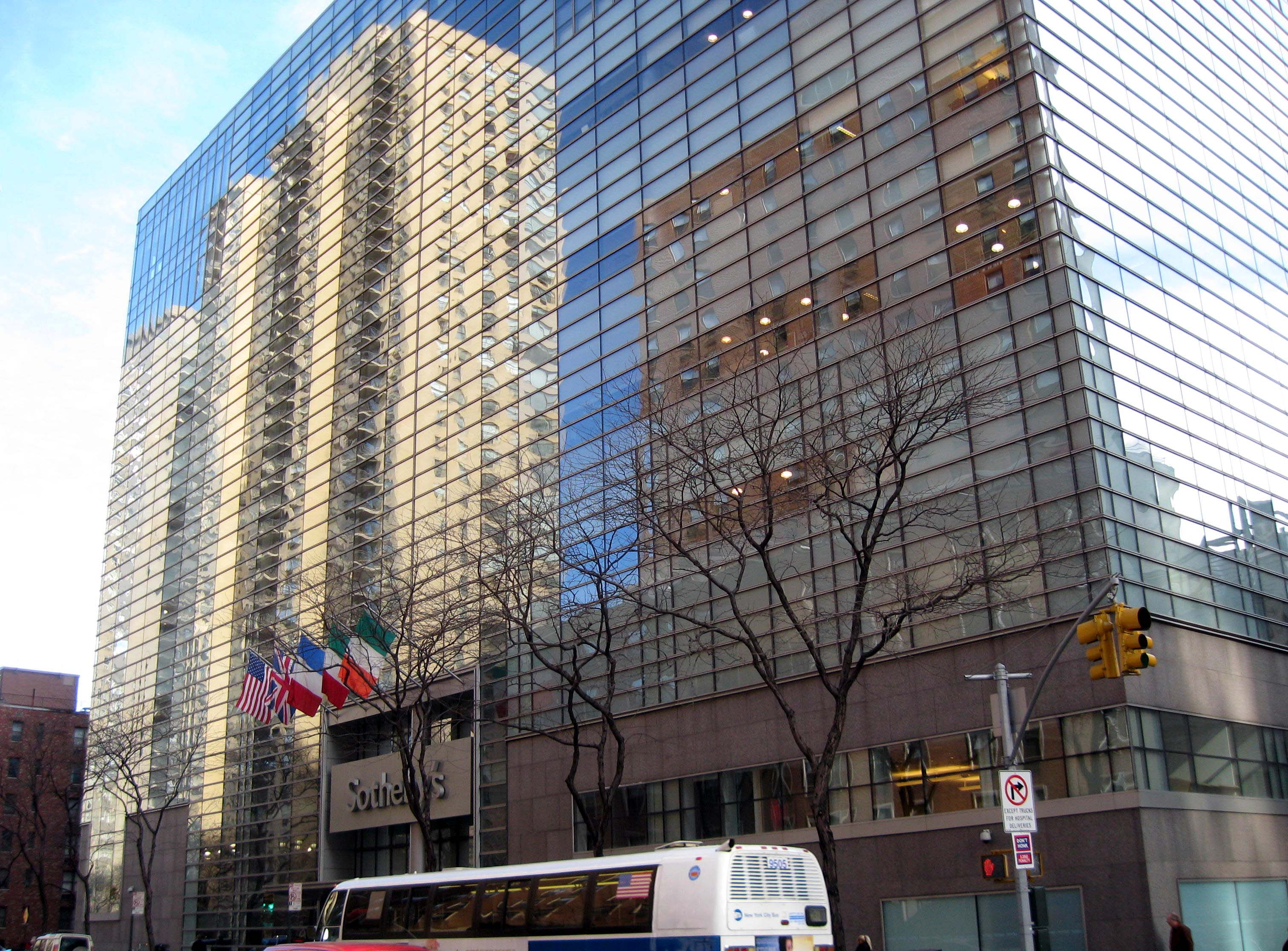
Sotheby's New York City headquarters on York Avenue

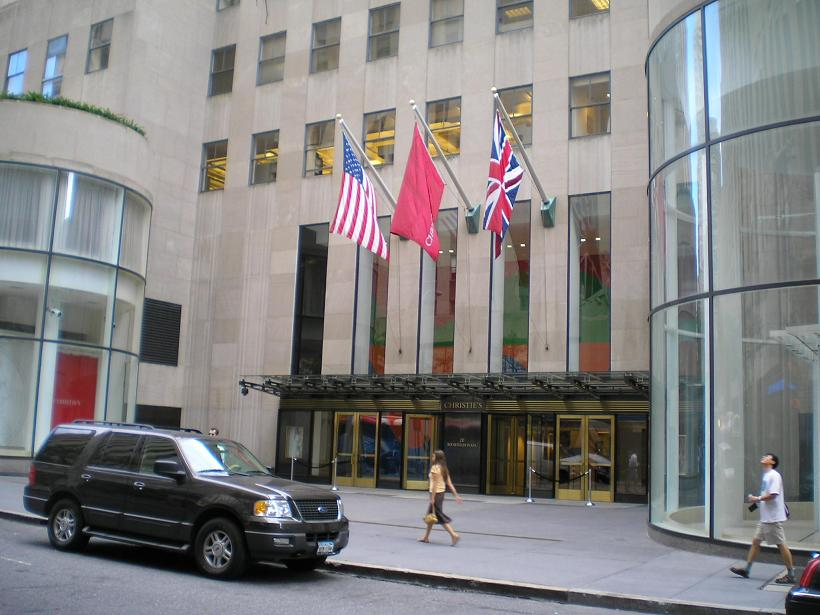
Christie's New York City headquarters in Rockefeller Center

An art auction or fine art auction is the sale of art works, in most cases in an auction house.

In England this dates from the latter part of the 17th century, when in most cases the names of the auctioneers were suppressed. In June 1693, John Evelyn mentions a "great auction of pictures (Lord Melfort's) in the Banqueting House, Whitehall", and the practice is frequently referred to by other contemporary and later writers.

Normally, an auction catalog, that lists the art works to be sold, is written and made available well before the auction date.

Some of the best known auction houses are Christie's and Sotheby's. The oldest auction house is Stockholm Auction House (Stockholms Auktionsverk). It was established in Sweden in 1674.

== History ==
=== Early days ===
Before the introduction of regular auctions the practice was, as in the case of the famous collection formed by Charles I, to price each object and invite purchasers, just as in other departments of commerce. But this was a slow process, especially in the case of pictures, and lacked the incentive of excitement. The first really important art collection to come under the hammer was that of Edward, Earl of Oxford, dispersed by Christopher Cock, under the Piazza, Covent Garden, on 8 March 1742 and the five following days, six more days being required by the coins. Nearly all the leading men of the day, including Horace Walpole, attended or were represented at this sale, and the prices varied from five shillings for an anonymous bishop's "head" to 165 guineas (gns.) for van Dyck's group of Sir Kenelm Digby, lady, and son.

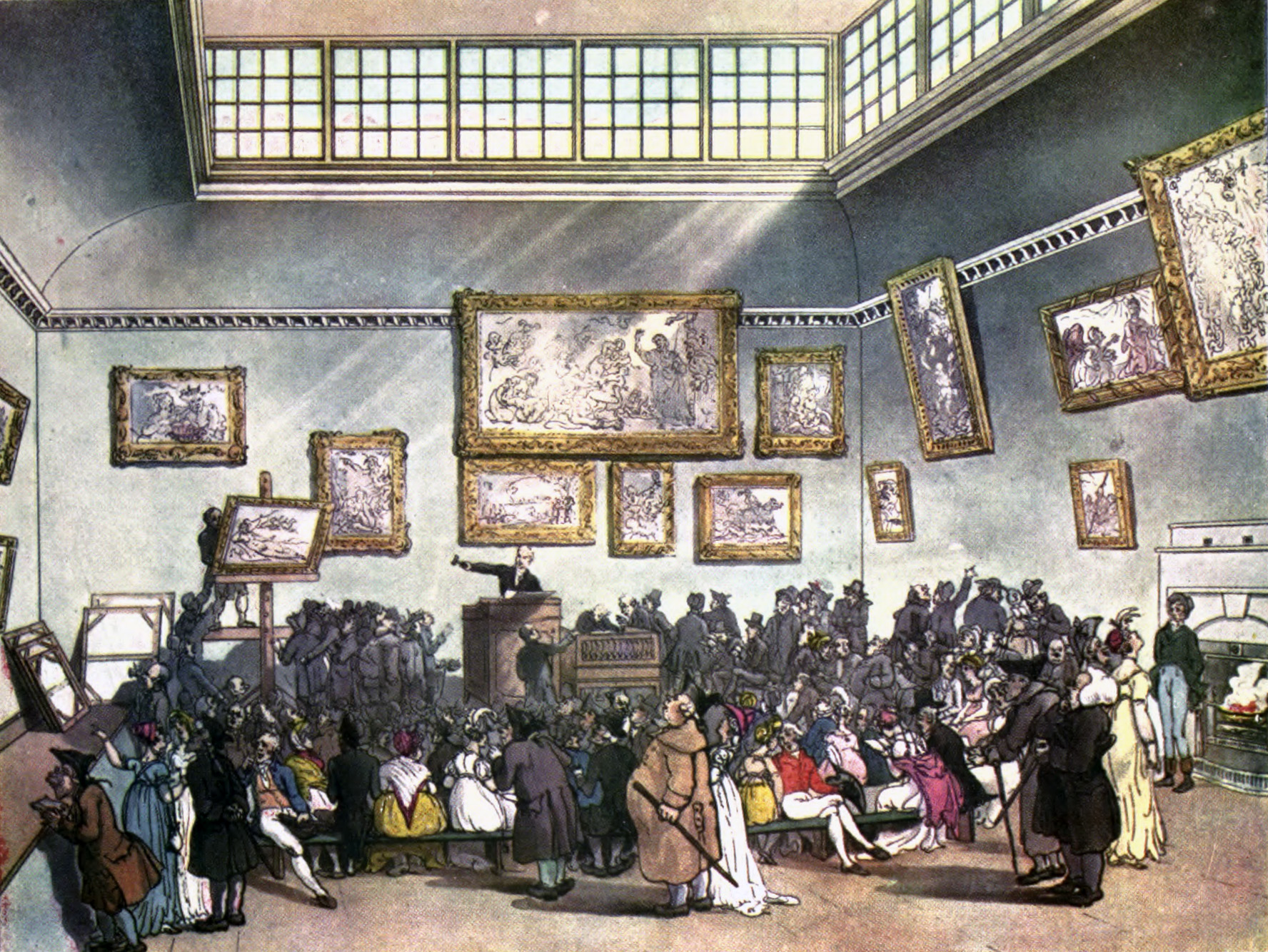
Auction Room, Christie's, circa 1808.

The next great dispersal was Dr Richard Mead's extensive collection, of which the pictures, coins and engraved gems, &c., were sold by Abraham Langford in February and March 1754, the sale realizing a total that was unprecedented up to that time. The thirty-eight days' sale (1786) of the Duchess of Portland's collection is noteworthy for including the Portland vase, now in the British Museum. High prices did not become general until the Calonne, John Trumbull (both 1795) and Bryan (1798) sales.

The quality of the artwork sold by auction before the late 18th century was probably not high. The importation of pictures and other objects of art had assumed extensive proportions by the end of the 18th century, but the genuine examples of the Old Masters probably fell far short of 1%. England was felt to be the only safe asylum for valuable articles, but the home which was intended to be temporary often became permanent. Had it not been for the political convulsions on the continent, England, instead of being one of the richest countries in the world in art treasures, would have been one of the poorest. This fortuitous circumstance also greatly raised the critical knowledge of arkworks. Genuine works realized high prices, as, for example, at Sir William Hamilton's sale (1801), when Beckford paid 1,300 gns. for the little picture of A Laughing Boy by Leonardo da Vinci; and when at the Lafontaine sales (1807 and 1811) two Rembrandts each realized 5,000 gns., The Woman taken in Adultery, now in the National Gallery, and The Master Shipbuilder, now at Buckingham Palace. The Beckford sale of 1823 (41 days) was the forerunner of the great art dispersal of the 19th century; Horace Walpole's accumulation at Strawberry Hill, 1842 (24 days), and the Stowe collection, 1848 (41 days), were also celebrated. They comprised every phase of art work, and in all the quality was of a very high order. They acted as a most healthy stimulus to art collecting, a stimulus which was further nourished by the sales of the superb collection of Ralph Bernal in 1855 (32 days), and of the almost equally fine but not so comprehensive collection of Samuel Rogers, 1856 (18 days).

Three years later came the dispersal of the 1,500 pictures which formed Lord Northwick's gallery at Cheltenham (pictures and works of art, 18 days).

=== Mid-19th century ===
In the mid-19th century, a new type of art collector emerged consisting of men who had made large fortunes in the various industries of the midlands and north of England and other centres. They were not hampered by "collecting" traditions, and their patronage was almost exclusively extended to the artists of the day. The dispersal of these collections began in 1863, and continued at irregular intervals for many years, e.g. Joseph Gillott (1872), Sam Mendel (1875), Wynne Ellis and Albert Levy (1876), Albert Grant (1877) and Munro of Novar (1878).

These patrons purchased at munificent prices either direct from the easel or from the exhibitions not only pictures in oils but also water-colour drawings. As a matter of investment their purchases frequently realized far more than the original outlay; sometimes, however, the reverse happened, as, for instance, in the case of Landseer's Otter Hunt, for which Albert Grant is said to have paid and which realized shortly afterwards only 5,650 gns.

One of the features of the sales of the 1870s was the high appreciation of water-colour drawings. At the Gillott sale (1872) 160 examples realized J. M. W. Turner's Bamburgh Castle fetching 3150 gins.; at the Quilter sale (1875) David Cox's The Hay-field, for which a dealer paid him 50 gins. in 1850, brought 259 gins. The following are the most remarkable prices of later years. In 1895 Cox's Welsh Funeral (which cost about ) sold for 2,400 gns., and Burne-Jones's Hesperides for 2460 gns. In 1908, 14 Turner drawings fetched (Acland-Hood sale) and 7 brought (Holland sale), the "Heidelberg" reaching 4,200 gins. For Frederick Walker's Harbour of Refuge 2,580 gins. were paid (Tatham sale) and 2,700 gins. for his Marlow Ferry (Holland).

The demand for pictures by modern artists, whose works sold at almost fabulous prices in the 1870s, had somewhat declined by the early 20th century; but during all its furore there was still a small band of collectors to whom the works of the Old Masters more especially appealed. The dispersal of such collections as the Bredel (1875), Watts Russell (1875), Foster of Clewer Manor (1876), the Hamilton Palace (17 days, )—one of the greatest art sales in the annals of Great Britain—Bale (1881), Leigh Court (1884), and Dudley (1892) resulted, as did the sale of many minor collections each season, in many very fine works of the Old Masters finding eager purchasers at high prices. A striking example of the high prices given was the realized by the pair of Anthony van Dyck portraits of a Genoese senator and his wife in the Peel sale, 1900.

=== Late 19th to early 20th centuries ===
In the last quarter of the 19th century and the first decade of the 20th, the chief feature in art sales was the demand for works, particularly female portraits, by Reynolds, his contemporaries and successors. This may be traced to the South Kensington Exhibitions of 1867 and 1868 and the annual winter exhibitions at Burlington House, which revealed an unsuspected wealth and charm in the works of many English artists who had almost fallen into oblivion.

A few of the most remarkable prices for such pictures may be quoted:

- Reynolds's Lady Betty Delmé (1894), 11,000 gns.;
- Romney's (1896), 10,500 gns.;
- Gainsborough's Portrait of Georgiana, Duchess of Devonshire (1876), 10,100 gns. Maria Walpole, 12,100 gns. (Duke of Cambridge's sale, 1904);
- Constable's Stratford Mill (1895), 8,500 gns.;
- Hoppner's Lady Waldegrave (1906), 6,000 gns.;
- Thomas Lawrence's Childhood's Innocence (1907), 8,000 gns.;
- Henry Raeburn's Lady Raeburn (1905), 85,00 gns.
- Turner's Mortlake Terrace (1908 Holland sale). 12,600 gns.

Between 1880 and the end of first decade of the 20th century the "appreciation" of the then modern continental schools, particularly the French, was considerable; of high prices paid may be mentioned:

- Corot's Danse des Amours (1898);
- Rosa Bonheur's Denizens of the Highlands (1888), 5,550 gns.;
- Jules Breton's First Communion, in New York City (1886);
- Meissonier's Napoleon I. in the Campaign of Paris, 12¼in. by 9¼in. (1882), 5,800 gns.,
- The Sign Painter (1891), 6,450 gns.

High prices were fetched for works by Charles-François Daubigny, Marià Fortuny, Louis Gallait, Jean-Léon Gérôme, Constant Troyon and Jozef Israëls. The most marked feature of the Edwardian art market was the demand for the 18th century painters Watteau, Boucher, Fragonard, Pater and Lancret; thus La Ronde Champêtre of the last named brought at the Say Sale in 1908, and Natoire's Le Reveil de Vénus at the Sedelmeyer sale, 1907.

"Specialism" is the one important development in art collecting which has manifested itself between the middle of the 19th century and the Edwardian period. This explained the high average quality of the Wellesley (1866), the Buccleuch (1888) and the Holford (1893) collections of drawings by the Old Masters; for the Sibson Wedgwood (1877), the Duc de Forli Dresden Porcelain (1877), the Shuldham blue and white porcelain (1880), the Benson collection of antique coins (1909), and for the objects of art at the Massey-Mainwaring sale of 1904, and the Lewis-Hill sale of 1907. Very many other illustrations in nearly every department of art collecting might be quoted—the superb series of Marlborough gems (1875 and 1899) might be included in this category but for the fact that it was formed chiefly in the 18th century. The appreciation—commercially at all events—of mezzotint portraits and of portraits printed in colours, after masters of the early English school, was one of the most remarkable features in art sales during the last years of the 19th century. The shillings of fifty years before were then represented by pounds. The Fraser collection (December 4 to 6, 1900) realized about ten times the original outlay, the mezzotint of the Sisters Frankland, after Hoppner, by W. Ward, selling for 290 gns. as against 10 gns. paid for it about thirty years previously.

The H. A. Blyth sale (March 11 to 13, 1901, 346 lots, : 10s.) of mezzotint portraits was even more remarkable, and as a collection it was the choicest sold in the first decade of the 20th century, the engravings being mostly in the first state. The record prices were numerous, and, in many cases, far surpassed the prices which Sir Joshua Reynolds received for the original pictures; e.g. the exceptionally fine example of the first state of the Duchess of Rutland, after Reynolds, by V. Green, realized 1,000 gns., whereas the artist received only for the painting itself. Even this unprecedented price for a mezzotint portrait was exceeded on the 30 April 1901, when an example of the first published state of Mrs Carnac, after Reynolds, by J. R. Smith, sold for 1,160 gns. At the Louis Huth sale (1905) 83 lots brought nearly Reynolds's Lady Bampfylde by T. Watson, first state before letters, unpublished, fetching 1,200 gns. Such prices as these and many others which might be quoted are exceptional, but they were paid for objects of exceptional rarity or quality.

The Holland sale in June 1908, realized (432 lots), a "record" sum for a collection of pictures mainly by modern artists; and that for the Rodolphe Kann collection (Paris) of pictures and objects of art, including 11 magnificent Rembrandts, Messrs Duveen paid in 1907. In the early 20th century, prices and competition in art auctions increased, largely owing to American and German buyers. In 1911, the demand for the finest works of art of all descriptions was much greater than the supply.

=== Late 20th century ===
In November 1970, Diego Velázquez’s Portrait of Juan de Pareja sold for $5.5 million. The sale tripled the previous world record of a decade earlier. In May 1990, Vincent van Gogh’s Portrait of Doctor Gachet sold for $82.5 million.

=== 21st century ===
In November 2013, $142.4 million was paid for the 1969 triptych, Three Studies of Lucian Freud, by Francis Bacon.

The highest price ever paid for an artwork at auction was Pablo Picasso's Les Femmes d'Alger (Version O) (Women of Algiers) that was sold by Christie's in May 2015 for $179.4 million.

Sotheby's and Christie's has become major dealers of Chinese porcelain antiques. As of 2016, some of the best collections had been auctioned for tens of millions US Dollars, through Sotheby's and Christie's.

In the 21st century, and especially since 2010, it has become more common for artworks to sell for prices in excess of $100m. Of the most expensive paintings of all time, most of those that sold for more than $100m were auctioned during or after 2010. The factors that can drive the price of a piece this high include the reputation of the artist, the age of the piece, the state of the art market, the piece's provenance, and the length of time since the piece was last up for sale.

One of the largest changes to art auctions in 21st century is introduction and expansion of online bidding in addition and sometimes replacement of physical auctions. This allowed larger auction houses like Christie's, Sotheby's, Phillips and Heritage to expand both their reach to potential bidders and the inventory of artifacts auctioned, and the process is still going. As a result of this shift, the art auction model is changing to become more inclusive of contemporary artists, and offering a broader range of the artworks to wider audiences. One of the most notable shifts associated with this change is constantly growing influence of the collectors from Asian markets.

== Controversies ==
In 2000, Christie's and Sotheby's admitted to a criminal price fixing conspiracy in violation of antitrust law, and each agreed to pay clients million in compensation for illegally coordinating the commissions they charged on sales between 1993 and early 2000. Alfred Taubman, former chairman of Sotheby's, went to prison upon being convicted for his part in the scheme. Sotheby's CEO Diana Brooks and her counterpart at Christie's, Christopher Davidge, confessed to the crime; Brooks implicated Taubman, who was fined million in addition to going to prison. After Christie's announced it was cooperating with the government in the antitrust investigation in January 2000, clients of both auction houses filed hundreds of lawsuits against them; the suits were later consolidated into one class-action suit. That autumn, the houses agreed to a million settlement in the class-action suit, with Taubman saying he would pay million of Sotheby's million share.

== See also ==
- List of oldest fine art auction houses
- Art dealer
- Art valuation
- Blockage discount
- CINOA, an international organization of art dealers

== Historical bibliography ==
The chief compilations dealing with art sales in Great Britain are: G. Redford, Art Sales (1888); and W. Roberts, Memorials of Christie's (1897); other books containing much important matter are W. Buchanan, Memoirs of Painting; The Year's Art (1880 and each succeeding year); F. S. Robinson, The Connoisseur; and Louis Soullié, Les Ventes de tableaux, dessins et objets d'art au XIX'e siècle (chiefly French).
