= Polly Morgan =

Polly Morgan may refer to:

- Polly Morgan (cinematographer), British cinematographer active since 2011
- Polly Morgan (taxidermist) (born 1980), British artist who specializes in taxidermy
