= Elad Lassry =

American artist (born 1977)

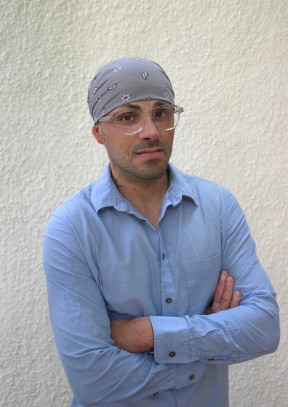
Elad Lassry

Elad Lassry (Hebrew: אלעד לסרי; born December 26, 1977, in Tel Aviv, Israel) is an American artist who lives and works in Los Angeles.

== Education ==
Lassry attended the California Institute of the Arts for film and visual art. He received his BFA from CalArts in 2003 and his MFA from the University of Southern California in 2007. At USC, his instructors included Sharon Lockhart and Frances Stark.

== Work ==
Lassry defines his practice as consumed with "pictures" — generic images culled from vintage picture magazines and film archives, redeploying them in a variety of media, including photography, film, drawing and sculpture. Leaving little distance between the commercial and the analytical, he is sometimes described as a post-Pictures Generation artist.

=== Photography ===
Starting with popular modes of production such as magazine advertising, he uses silk-screening and photography to revive iconic art-historical arrangements, such as the pairing of mother and child or the arrangement of fruit a conventional still life, disrupting their original harmony with geometric displacements or a palette of bright colours. His chromogenic color prints — still life compositions, photocollages, and studio portraits of friends and celebrities — never exceed the dimensions of a magazine page or spread (35 x 28 cm) and are displayed in frames that derive their colors from the dominant hues in the photographs. In certain black-and-white gelatin silver-prints the frames are silver.

=== Films ===
Lassry often displays his photographs beside 16mm film projections in a continuous loop on the wall. The films are projected according to dimensions similar to the still images on view, allowing them to be seen in the context of the basic photographic image of which each frame is finally composed; in addition, the films are not converted into a digital format and are always presented in their original form. In his silent 35 mm film Untitled (king snake) (2010), Lassry alternates between two different scenes. In the first, a woman — played by the actress Rose Byrne — appears who seemingly converses with another person. In the second, the viewer sees only the woman's hands, in which a California kingsnake coils itself together.

=== Performance ===
In early 2012, Lassry staged a warm-up with dancers from the New York City Ballet at the Hayworth Theater in Los Angeles. In September 2012, he debuted Untitled (Presence) at The Kitchen, an exhibition and corresponding performance under the same title. The performance work featured ten dancers from the American Ballet Theatre and New York City Ballet interacting with brightly colored moving walls that had cutouts similar to those in the gallery space and on Lassry's billboard along the High Line. Karen Rosenberg reviewed the exhibition and performance in The New York Times, calling it "seductive and thought-provoking" and stating that "it encouraged you to think about the camera as a choreographer of vision." Tim Griffin, director of The Kitchen, curated the exhibition.

== Exhibitions ==
One year after graduating from the University of Southern California, Lassry mounted a solo exhibition at the Art Institute of Chicago in the Film, Video and New Media gallery. The exhibition consisted of two films, Untitled (Agon), 2007 and Zebra and Woman, 2007.

Solo exhibitions of Lassry's work have since been held at, among others, The Whitney Museum of American Art, New York, Tramway, Glasgow, and an exhibition at the Vancouver Art Gallery, Canada, curated by artist Jeff Wall. His first major monographic exhibition in the United States, Elad Lassry: Sum of Limited Views, was on view at the Contemporary Art Museum of Saint Louis and subsequently travelled to Kunsthalle Zürich, Switzerland. In conjunction with the 2010 show Sum of Limited Views, the Kunsthalle Zürich published the exhibition book, Elad Lassry.

Lassry's work has also been included in numerous exhibitions worldwide, including institutions such as the Los Angeles County Museum of Art, Los Angeles, CA; the Multimedia Art Museum, Moscow, Russia; the Museum of Contemporary Art, Chicago; the Walker Art Center, Minneapolis, MN; the Guggenheim Museum, New York, NY; the Museum of Modern Art, New York, NY; Museo de Atre Moderno, Medellin, Colombia; Centro de la Imagen, Mexico City; The New Museum, New York, NY; The Hammer Museum, Los Angeles, CA; and the Fondazione Prada, Venice, Italy.

At the 54th Venice Biennale, Lassry debuted the film Untitled (Ghost), 2011, along with several photographs in the ILLUMInazioni - ILLUMInations exhibition at the Venetian Arsenale. His work was also included in the 2009 New Museum Triennial and the 2008 California Biennial.

In 2012, Lassry created a billboard for the High Line in New York. The large billboard is an alluring image of two young women, both dressed alike, gazing out of two small portholes into a sea of green. The High Line Billboard was scheduled to overlap with Lassry's exhibition and performance, Untitled (Presence), at The Kitchen.

== Recognition ==
Lassry was the winner of the 2007 John Jones Art on Paper Award. As part of the prize, Lassry exhibited several works at the 2008 Zoo Art Fair made over the 12-month period after receiving the award. In 2010, he was nominated for the Rencontres d'Arles Discovery Award (France) and exhibited his works.

In 2011, art critic Sarah Schmerler wrote in Art in America: "[if] Elad Lassry hadn't come along at this particular moment in photography's history, theorists would probably have had to invent him."

In 2011, Lassry was nominated for the Deutsche Börse Photography Prize.

== Collections ==
- Art Institute of Chicago, Chicago, IL
- Guggenheim Museum, New York, NY
- Los Angeles County Museum of Art, Los Angeles, CA
- Museum of Contemporary Art, Chicago, IL
- Museum of Contemporary Art, Los Angeles, CA
- Museum of Contemporary Art, North Miami, FL
- Museum of Modern Art, New York, NY
- Walker Art Center, Minneapolis, MN
- Whitney Museum of American Art, New York, NY
- Museum Ludwig, Germany
- Castello di Rivoli – Museo d'Arte Contemporanea, Italy
- Foto Museum Winterthur, Switzerland

== Literature ==
- Kathleen S. Bartles and Jeff Wall, Elad Lassry (Vancouver Art Gallery 2017).
- Alessandro Rabottini, Elad Lassry (Mousse Publishing 2014).
- Karen Marta and Massimiliano Gioni, Elad Lassry: 2000 Words (DESTE Foundation for Contemporary Art 2013).
- Honey Luard, Elad Lassry (White Cube 2013).
- Elad Lassry, "On Onions'' (Primary Information 2012).
- Douglas Crimp, Elad Lassry (White Cube 2011).
- Beatrix Ruf, Elad Lassry (JRP Ringier 2010).
