= Polly Morgan (taxidermist) =

British artist

- Born: 1980 (age 45–46); Banbury, Oxfordshire, England
- Education: George Jamieson, Edinburgh
- Known for: Taxidermy
- Notable work: Rabbit on Hat; For Sorrow; Still Life After Death (fox)
- Website: Polly Morgan Website

Polly Morgan (born 1980) is a London-based British artist who uses taxidermy to create works of art.

== Biography ==
Polly Morgan was born in Banbury, Oxfordshire England in 1980, and grew up in the Cotswolds on her family farm, and mentions a lack of squeamishness about death as well as being comfortable with the practice of dealing with the corpses of animals. She moved to East London in 1998 and continues to live there today. Morgan graduated from Queen Mary, University of London, in English Literature in 2002.

During her studies, Morgan worked at Shoreditch Electricity Show Rooms, a bar popular with artists; after graduation, she continued to work there as manager. At 23 Morgan was living above the bar and working out of her apartment, "tinkering with taxidermy." Inspired to create work of her own she took a course with the professional taxidermist George Jamieson, of Cramond, in Edinburgh, during which her intuitive and personal response to the medium were obvious. Morgan's first pieces were commissioned by Bistrotheque, after which she was spotted by Banksy: A lovebird looking in a mirror; a squirrel holding a belljar with a little fly perched inside on top of a sugar cube; a magpie with a jewel in its beak; and a couple of chicks standing on a miniature coffin'. In 2005, he invited her to show her work for Santa's Ghetto, an annual exhibition he organized near London's Oxford Street. Her next piece, a white rat in a champagne glass, was exhibited at Wolfe Lenkiewicz's Zoo Art Fair in 2006 and was purchased by Vanessa Branson. Morgan works from a Bethnal Green studio.

Morgan is a member of the UK Guild of Taxidermists. The animals used in her taxidermy are contributed by a network of clients; the animals Morgan uses have died naturally or had unpreventable deaths. She maintains a detailed log of all dead animals in stock.

Morgan believes that those who consider her work disrespectful or cruel to animals are "childish," and that anthropomorphizing the animals she uses is meaningless. Her work emphasizes and displays animals in a way nontraditional to taxidermy, putting the animals in positions which do not generally imply that they are still alive, rather emphasizing the dying fall of the animal.

Morgan is married to Mat Collishaw with whom she has two sons.

== Exhibitions ==
Notable exhibitions include:

- Still Life After Death, 2006 at Kristy Stubbs Gallery
- The Exquisite Corpse, 2007 at Trinity Church, 1 Marylebone Road
- You Dig the Tunnel, I'll Hide the Soil, 2008 at White Cube
- Mythologies, 2009 at Haunch of Venison
- The Age of the Marvellous, 2009 at All Visual Arts
- Psychopomps, 2010 at Haunch of Venison
- Contemporary Eye: Crossovers, 2010 at Pallant House Gallery
- Passion Fruits, 2011 at ME Collectors Room
- Burials, 2011 at Workshop Venice
- Dead Time, 2011 at Voide, Derry
- Endless Plains, 2012 at All Visual Arts
- 10,000 Hours, 2012 at Kunstmuseum Thurgau
- Foundation/Remains, 2013 at The Office Gallery, Nicosia, Cyprus
- The Nature of the Beast, 2013 at The New Art Gallery, Walsall
- Beasts of England, Beasts of Ireland, 2013 at VISUAL Centre for Contemporary Art
- Curiouser and Curiouser, 2014 at Warrington Museum and Art Gallery
- Fates Refrain, 2014 at Robilant + Voena Gallery
- Organic Matters, 2015 at The National Museum of Women in Art
- Dead Animals and the Curious Occurrence of Taxidermy in Contemporary Art, 2016 at David Winton Bell Gallery - Brown University
- Animal Farm, Beastly Muses and Metaphors, 2016 at S|2 GALLERY
- Daydreaming With Stanley Kubrick, 2016 at Somerset House
- 5 Years at Heddon Street, 2016 at Pippy Houldsworth Gallery
- Faith and Fathom, 2016 at Galleria Poggiali
- Naturalia, 2017 at Paul Kasmin Gallery

== See also ==
- What Do Artists Do All Day?
