= French art dealers committee =

Comité Professionnel des Galeries d'Art (French Art Dealers Committee) is a French professional association established in 1947 in Paris with the mission to represent French art galleries before the state authorities. In broader terms, its role is to act as a consultant, or a mediator, for the benefit of art professionals, providing technical assistance with tax matters, customs regulations, social security legislation, etc. Through its activities, the Committee plays an active role in the development of the art market.

It also ensures maintenance of professional ethics and standards.

President: Patrick Bongers

Vice-President: Nathalie Obadia

Former Presidents:

1947-1970 : Paul Martin

1970-1983 : Gildo Caputo

1983-1993 : Michel Dauberville

1993-2004 : Anne Lahumière

List of Members: www.comitedesgaleries.com

Upon request from the Committee, at the end of 2005 the French Institute CSA completed a survey on satisfaction with the profession, which provides a panorama of French art galleries and indications regarding the stability of the market and dealers' expectations.
