= Lancret =

Lancret is a surname. Notable people with the surname include:

- Michel Ange Lancret (1774–1807), French engineer
- Nicolas Lancret (1690–1743), French painter
- Bernard Lancret (1912–1983), French film actor

== See also ==
- Lancet (disambiguation)
