= Art finance =

Art finance and Art finance advisory are terms referring to a set of financial services provided by some auction houses, banks, and consulting firms, and marketed to such firms' clients who are art collectors or artists.

== Generally ==
Art finance can refer to both

- acquiring art works by financing them rather than buying them outright, and
- collateralizing a loan with art works and related property.

Firms offering such services differ in the range of services provided, but can include art purchase financing, art secured lending, art insurance, art appraisal, provenance verification, market research, curatorial services, art investment advice, and personal shopping services.

== Art loans ==
Art loans may be made for many reasons, some of which may include advances against art not yet produced (usually made to artists of some repute), advances against items to be auctioned or otherwise sold (known as a bridge loan to sale, a type of bridge loan), to finance new purchases (known as acquisition financing and similar to a mortgage), and loans to assist dealers amass inventory (known as a working capital line of credit).

In the difficult economic climate of 2009, some banks previously offering such services discontinued them. UBS, the world’s biggest wealth manager and sponsor of Art Basel, announced in April 2009 that it would close its 11-year-old art advisory division. In contrast, some start-up art financiers have stepped into the vacuum created by the departing banks, such as former corporate raider Asher Edelman, who founded ArtAssure Ltd. in 2010 to provide liquidity to the art market in the form of non-recourse art loans and unique and legally-untested methods of auction guarantees.

In September 2008 the Museum of American Finance held a panel discussion on financing to support art acquisitions.

In April 2012, the art lending market was roughly US $7 billion.

== High-profile art finance ==
In late July 2009, The New York Times reported that the art finance firm Art Capital Group sued photographer Annie Leibovitz in the New York State Supreme Court for non-payment on a $24 million loan, seeking damages through access to her home, negatives, and all her intellectual property rights in her photographs. In March, 2010, Colony Capital concluded a new financing and marketing agreement with Leibovitz, paying off Art Capital and removing or reducing the risks of Leibovitz losing her artistic and real estate assets.

== Criticism ==
It has been noted that art lending practices can contribute to and enable art crime by acting as a form of private banking for the art world and as such, suffer from a lack of transparency and encourage high risk borrowing behavior, as occurred with Leibovitz. Iain Robertson of Sotheby's Institute wrote "the art market's often covert and secretive buying and selling practices do encourage or at least permit high levels of criminal behavior."

== See also ==
- Art market
- Art sale
- Art valuation
- Curator
- Blockage discount
- Finance
