= Zoo Art Fair =

Zoo Art Fair was a London-based non-profit art fair held annually in October. The event got its name from its first venue, the London Zoo in Regent's Park, and it "established a reputation for showcasing new and innovative contemporary British art". According to Kit Hammonds, a lecturer at the Royal College of Art, in London, the event was "doing something quite interesting", but later "lost its viability" due to competition from the Frieze Art Fair. The last Zoo Art Fair was held in 2009.

== Background ==
The fifth Zoo Art Fair was held from 17 to 20 October 2008 at Royal Academy of Arts, 6 Burlington Gardens in central London. One of the foremost international platforms for emerging Contemporary art talent, the Fair showcases 58 under 6 year-old commercial and non-commercial arts organisations from across 15 countries. Exhibitors include galleries, project spaces, artist collectives, curatorial groups and publications. In addition special exhibitions include solo shows of last year's Champagne Perrier-Jouët Prize winner, Karla Black and John Jones Award winner, Elad Lassry, a site-specific group show of works in vinyl responding the architecture of the building, Los Vinilos as well as a programme of film and video and a series of performances.

Since 2004 Zoo Art Fair has identified and platformed emerging commercial and non-commercial art organisations including galleries, project spaces, artist collectives, curatorial groups and publications during London's Frieze Art Fair. Zoo Art Fair is a non-profit enterprise, sponsored by established galleries, collectors, arts businesses and public funders as well as commercial brands and businesses.

== History ==
Zoo Art Fair 2008:
Exhibitors: 58 under 6 year old International exhibitors, including 23 from the UK and 35 from international organisations (Brazil, Czech Republic, Denmark, France, Germany, India, Italy, the Netherlands, Portugal, Spain, Sweden, Switzerland, USA and Turkey) selected by an independent selection committee.
Visitors: over 15,000 attending over five days.
Sales: £1.5 million in sales

Zoo Art Fair 2007:
Exhibitors: 61 under 6 year old exhibitors, including 35 from the UK and 26 from international organisations (Brazil, Belgium, Switzerland, Germany, Denmark, USA, the Netherlands, Tokyo) selected by an independent selection committee for the first time.
Visitors: over 12,500 attending over five days.
Sales: £2.8 million in sales

Zoo Art Fair 2006:
Exhibitors: 46 exhibitors, including 31 from the UK and 15 from Mexico, Berlin and Los Angeles by invitation
Visitors: over 11,500 attending over four days.
Sales: £1.7 million in sales

Zoo Art Fair 2005:
Exhibitors: 28 under 4 year old UK exhibitors by invitation
Visitors: over 10,000 visitors
Sales: over £1 million in sales.

Zoo Art Fair 2004:
Exhibitors: 26 under 3 year old local London spaces by invitation
Visitors: 8,000 visitors over four public days
Sales: over £500,000 worth of work sold
