= Art valuation =

Estimation of market value of works of art

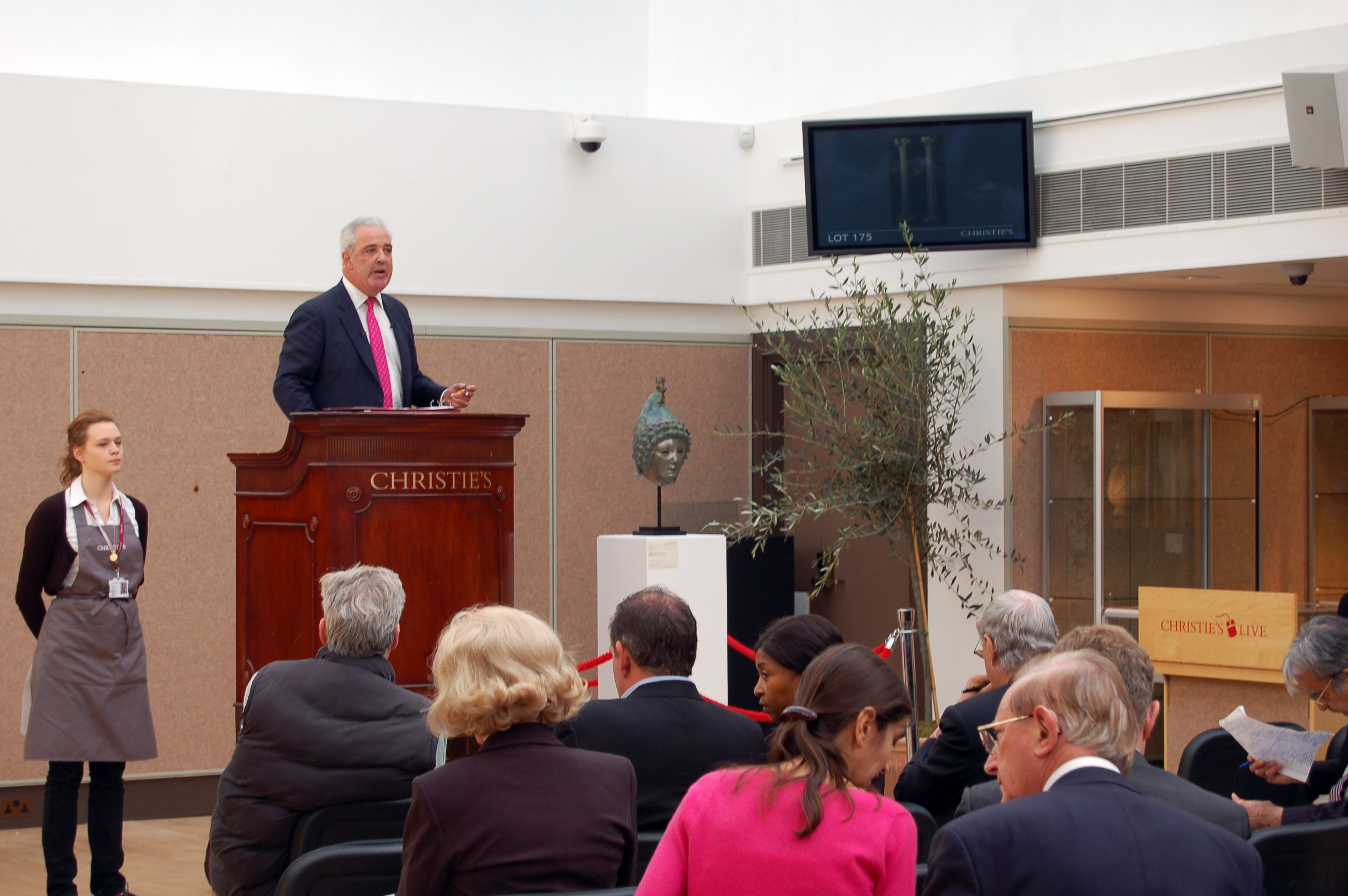
An art auction at Christies

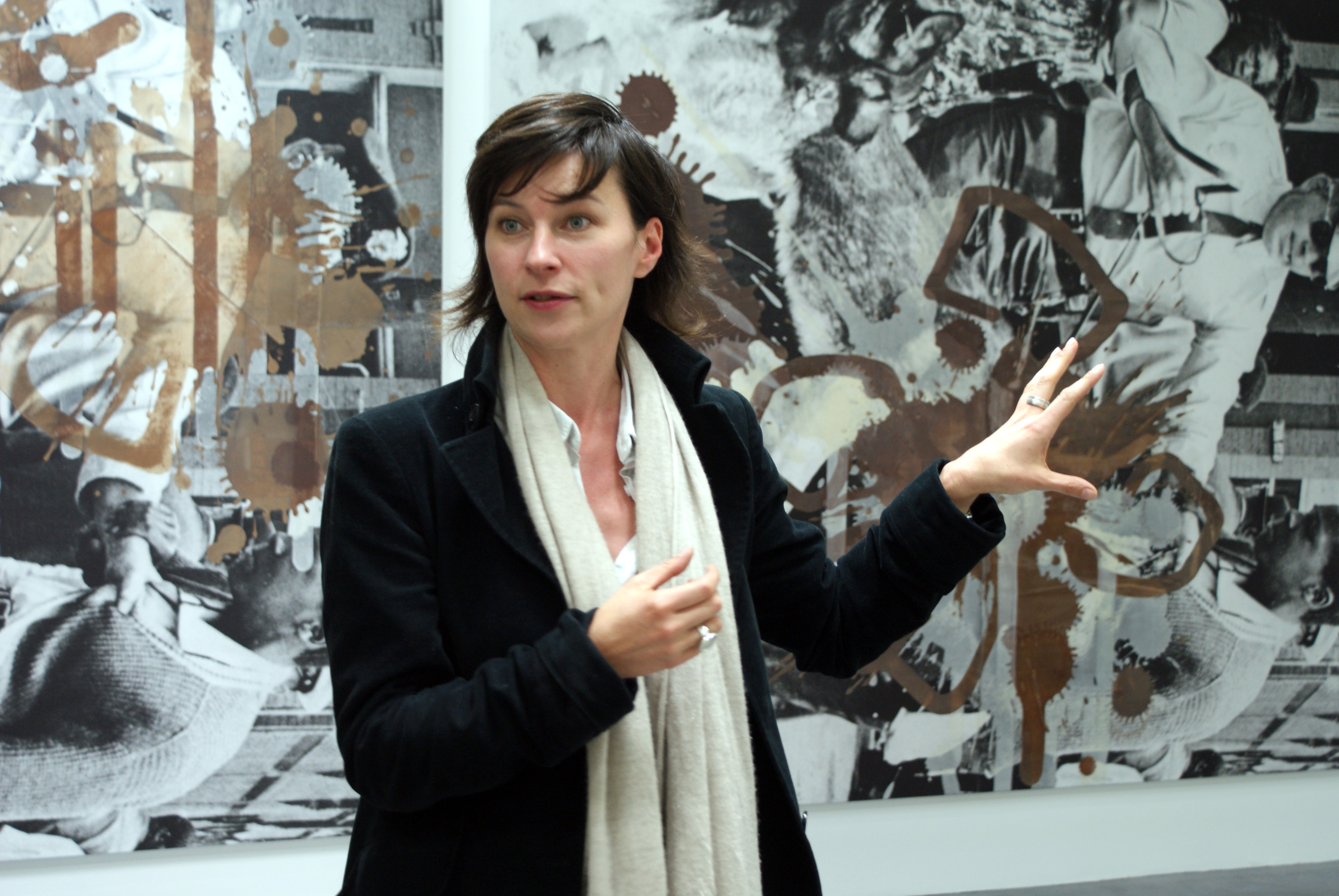
An art curator, Anne Pontégnie

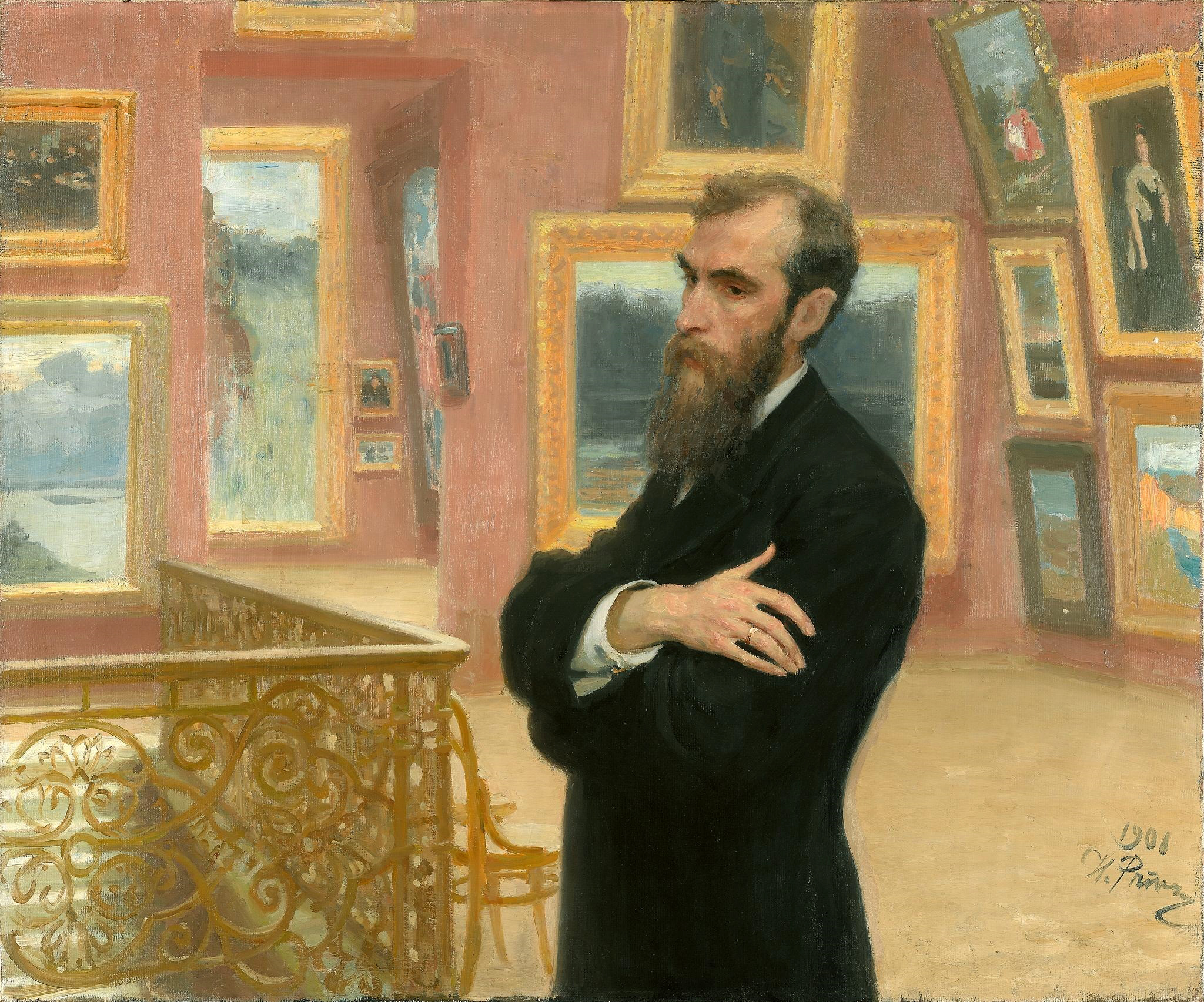
An art collector

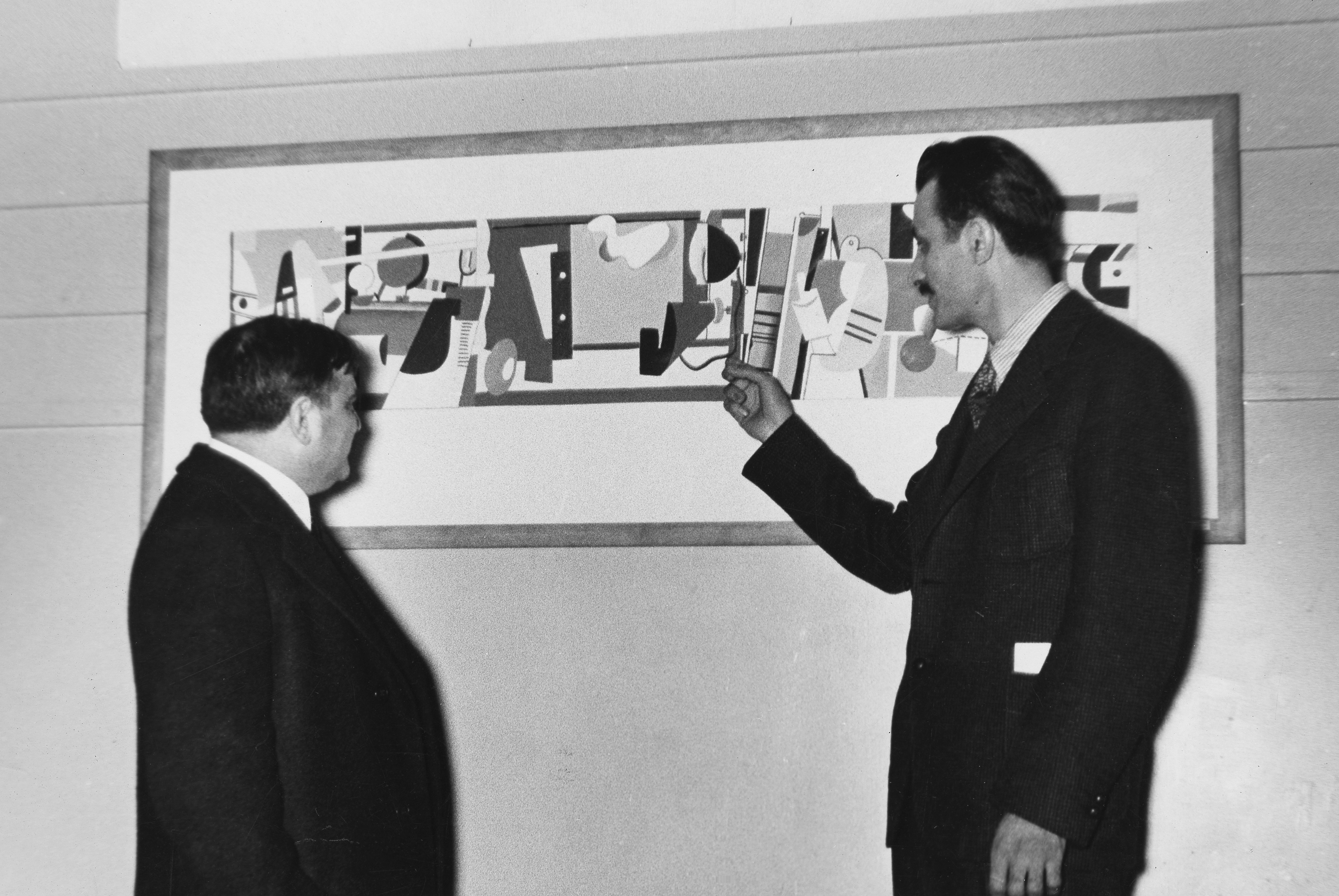
An art opening

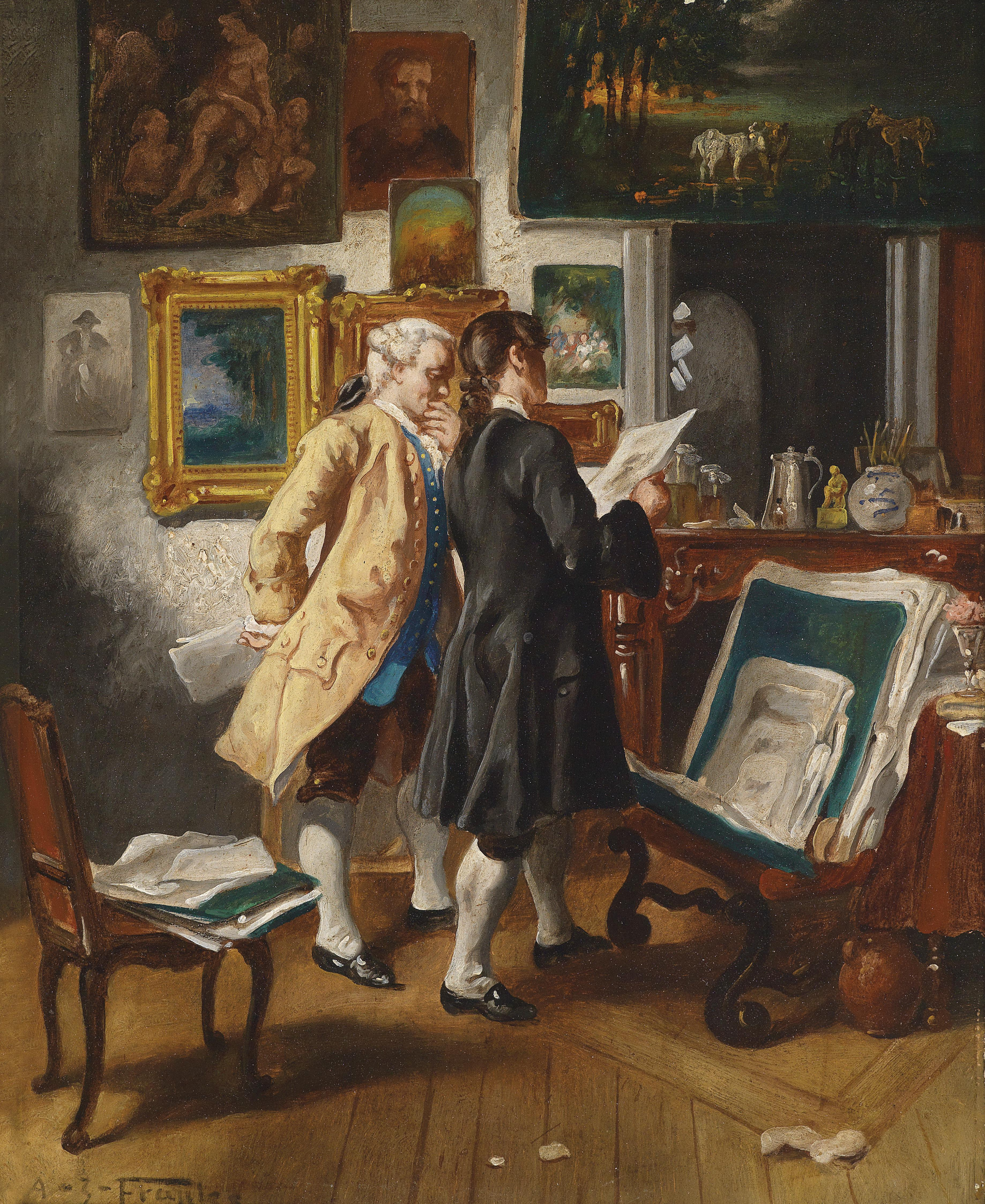
An art dealer

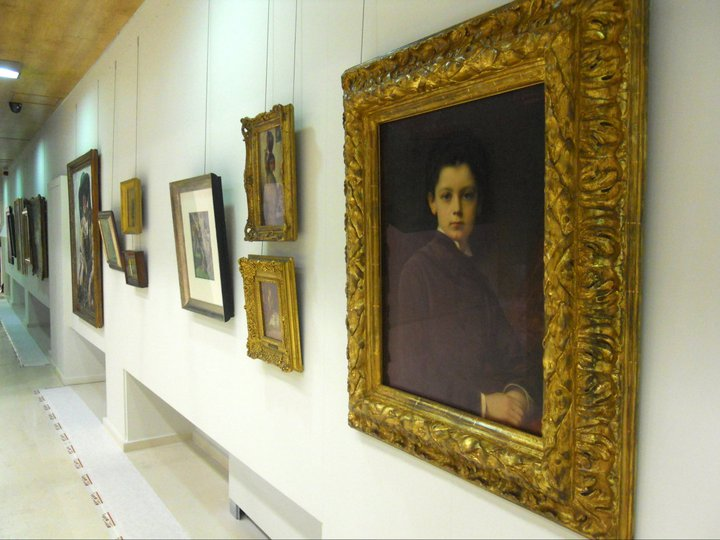
An art exhibition

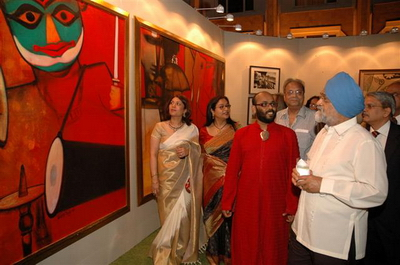
An art gallery

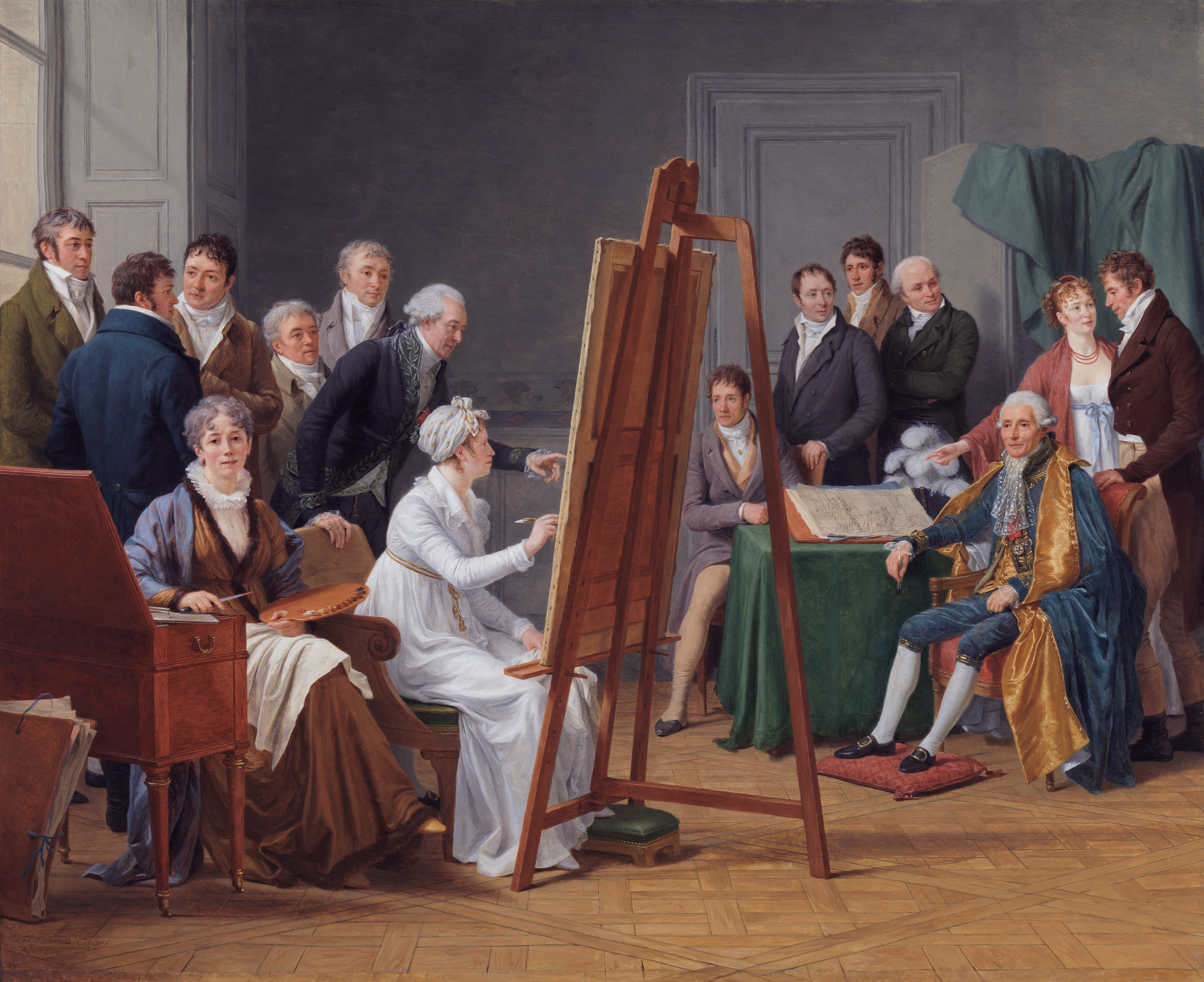
An art studio visit

Art valuation, an art-specific subset of financial valuation, is the process of estimating the market value of works of art. As such, it is more of a financial rather than an aesthetic concern, however, subjective views of cultural value play a part as well. Art valuation involves comparing data from multiple sources such as art auction houses, private and corporate collectors, curators, art dealer activities, gallerists (gallery owners), experienced consultants, and specialized market analysts to arrive at a value. Art valuation is accomplished not only for collection, investment, divestment, and financing purposes, but as part of estate valuations, for charitable contributions, for tax planning, insurance, and loan collateral purposes. This article deals with the valuation of works of fine art, especially contemporary art, at the top end of the international market, but similar principles apply to the valuation of less expensive art and antiques.

== Historic valuation and contemporary art ==
The source of a work's artistic charisma has long been debated between artists who create and patrons who enable, but the charismatic power of artworks on those who would possess them is historically the initial driver of value. In the 1960s that charismatic power started edging over to accommodate commercialized culture and a new industry of art, when aesthetic value fell from prominence to parity with Pop art and Andy Warhol's idea of business art, a recognition that art has become a business and making money in business is an art. One of many artists to follow Warhol is Jeff Koons, a stockbroker turned artist who also borrowed imagery from popular culture and made millions.

For collectors, the emotional connection felt toward a work or collection creates subjective personal value. The weight assigned by such a collector to that subjective measure as a portion of a work's overall financial value may be greater than that by an art speculator not sharing the collector's emotional investment, however, non-economic value measures such as "Do I like it?" or "Does it speak to me?" still have economic effect because such measures can be deciding factors in a purchase.

In contrast, the Art Dealers Association of America (ADAA) suggests that the key issues are authenticity, quality, rarity, condition, provenance and value.

== Valuing art ==
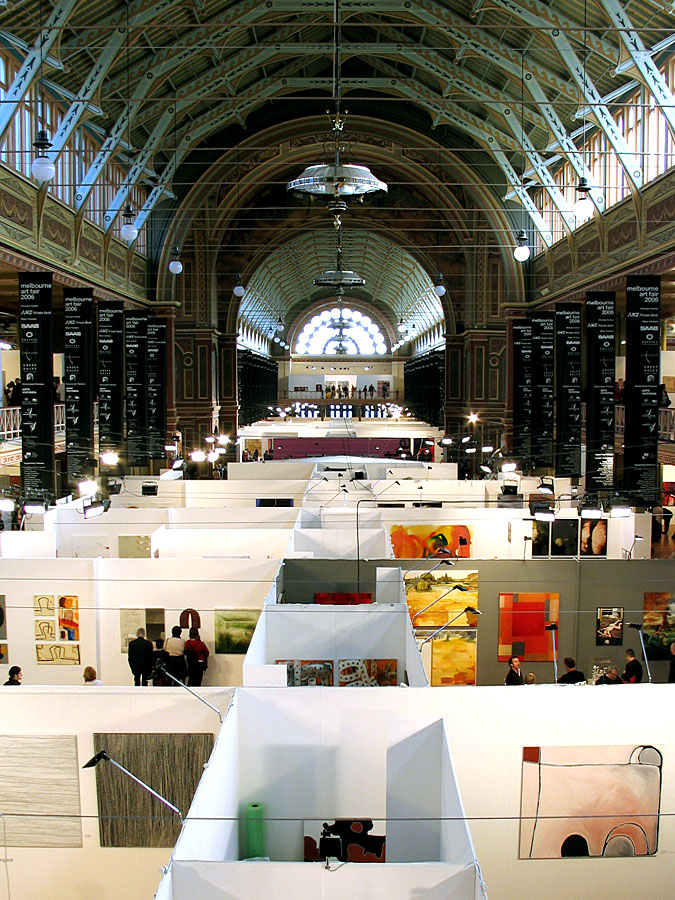
An art fair

Art valuation activity concerns itself with estimating market demand, estimating liquidity capability of lots, works, and artists, the condition and provenance of works, and with valuation trends such as average sale price and mean estimates. As with other markets, the art market uses its own industry-specific terms of art or vocabulary, for example, "bought-in", describing the disadvantageous situation occurring when a work or lot at auction is returned to its owner having been passed over, withdrawn or otherwise unsold. Valuing art is also necessary when a piece is to be used as collateral. The art-lending market has expanded to an estimated $15 billion to $19 billion of loans outstanding in the U.S. The shift in Asia towards investment in western art is a factor that has allowed art lending companies to launch offices in Asia as western works are often easier to use as collateral.

=== Market demand ===
As in the housing market, "comparables" are used to determine what level of demand similar items have in a current market. The freshness of the comparables is important because the art market is fluid and stale comparables will yield estimates that may have little relation to a work's current value. Subject matter and the medium of a work also affect market demand, as does rarity.

=== Liquidity ===
Liquidity in the art market means having artworks in very high demand and being able to sell those works without impediment. Art sales slow in downturns resulting in the market becoming more illiquid. There is a greater degree of liquidity risk facing the art investor than with other financial assets because there is a limited pool of potential buyers, and with artworks not reaching their reserve prices and not being sold, this has an effect on the auction prices. In a divorce action between a couple who sought to divide a $102 million collection between them, the couple decided a sale would prove problematic because selling the entire collection and dividing the profit would saturate the market and drive down prices; in reporting on the case, The Seattle Times described the case as a study on how people measure the value of art, and which counts for more — pragmatism or sentiment. The newspaper reported that one of the two litigants had a more sentimental view of the value of the works, while the other had a more businesslike view, wanting balance and diversification. The newspaper attempted to calculate the value of the many artworks at issue in the case by determining a per-square-inch price based on each piece's value divided by its dimension, to end up with a per-square-inch price to apply to the amount of wall space the businesslike litigant wanted to cover with the available art. The Times ultimately concluded that using this formula as between the litigants, John Singer Sargent's Dans les Oliviers à Capri was valued at $26,666.67 per square inch, that the sentimental litigant received $3,082 of appraised value per square inch while the businesslike litigant received $1,942 per square inch, but could cover more wall space.

=== Valuation trends ===
Trends for values from the world's top auction houses are compared for study of market direction and how that direction affects given artists and works. Valuations for art sold at the market's top houses usually carry more weight than valuations from less established houses, as most of the top houses have hundreds of years of experience.

Long term economic trends can have a great impact on the valuation of certain types of work. In recent decades the values of historic Russian and Chinese art have greatly benefited from increased wealth in those countries creating new and very rich collectors, as the values of Orientalist and Islamic art had earlier been boosted by oil wealth in the Arab world.

=== Participant activity ===
One of many factors in the primary market's price of a living artist's work is a dealer's contract with an artist: many dealers, as stakeholders in their artists' success, agree to buy their own stable of artists' work at auction in order to prevent price drops, to maintain price stability, or to increase perceived value, or all three, thus dealers bidding on their own artists at auction have a direct impact on the selling price for those artists' works and as a result, the valuation of those works.

=== Research data ===
Research data available from art auction houses such as Christie's, Sotheby's, Phillips, Bonhams, and Lyon & Turnbull are those tracking market trends such as yearly lot transactions, bought-in statistics, sales volume, price levels, and pre-auction estimates. There are also companies such as ArtTactic utilizing art auction data as providers of art market research analysis. Information available from internet-based art sale history databases generally does not include the condition of a work, a very important factor, therefore the prices quoted in those databases reflect auction hammer prices without other, crucial valuation factors. Additionally, the databases of auctioned work do not cover private sales of works, and thus their use for art valuation is but one source among many needed for determining value.

=== General valuation factors ===
Valuation estimates by auction houses are typically given in ranges of prices to offset uncertainty. Generally, estimates are made by looking at what a comparable piece of art sold for recently, with estimates given in a range of prices rather than one fixed figure, and in the case of contemporary art especially, having few comparables or when an artist is not well known and has no auction history, the risks of incorrect valuation are greatest.

One potential factor in valuation are the seller's reasons for selling a particular work and/or the buyer's reasons for buying, neither of which may have anything to do with the other. For example, a seller may be motivated by financial need, boredom with a particular artwork, or the desire to raise funds for a different purchase. Common motivations include the so-called three D's: death, debt and divorce. Buyers may be motivated by market excitement, may be acting in accord with a collection plan, or buying like buyers of stock: to drive value up or down either for themselves or for another person.

One method for pricing pieces by new artists of uncertain value is to ignore aesthetics and consider, besides market trends, three semi-commoditized aspects: "scale" – size and level of detail, "intensity" – effort, and "medium" – quality of the materials.

Valuing artworks in such a specialized market, therefore, takes into account a wide variety of factors, some indeed in conflict with each other.

== Valuation for tax and other law-related purposes ==
In the United States, art bought and sold by collectors is treated as a capital asset for tax purposes, and disputes relating to the valuation of art or the nature of gain on its sale are usually decided by the federal Tax Court, and sometimes by other courts applying federal tax law to specific cases.

=== Important U.S. cases ===
- Crispo Gallery v. Commissioner (need to produce credible documentary evidence of valuation as taxpayer has ultimate burden of persuasion),
- Angell v. Commissioner (fraud perpetuated upon the IRS through inflated appraisals),
- Drummond v. Commissioner (cannot claim gain from art sale as income from business unless actually in the business),
- Estate of Querbach v. A & B Appraisal Serv. (appraiser's liability for misidentifying a painting),
- Estate of Robert Scull v. Commissioner (previous sales of the same property without subsequent events affecting value are generally strong indicators of fair market value),
- Nataros v. Fine Arts Gallery of Scottsdale (in the absence of fraud or negligent misrepresentation, buyers believing they have overpaid at auction because of bad advice bear a heavy burden of proof),
- Williford v. Commissioner (the 'Williford Factors' test: eight factors to determine whether property is held for investment or held for sale).

== See also ==
- Appraiser
- Art finance
- Blockage discount
- Market demand
- Valuation; sociology of valuation
