= Blockage discount =

Blockage discount is an art-business-related and legal term of art for referring to the money discount assigned to a group of artworks by a single artist when that group of works is to be released to market as a group rather than individually. A blockage discount adjusts the fair market value of the works downward because of the risks of depreciation when a large volume of art is released into the market all at once.

== Tax issues ==
A blockage discount adjusting fair market value also affects the tax consequences of a sale in the U.S., and is frequently a subject of litigation when an artist dies while holding a large collection of her or his own work. For instance, when Georgia O'Keeffe died she had over 400 of her own works in her estate, and when Andy Warhol died he had over 90,000 works, including 4,100 paintings, 9,000 drawings, 19,000 prints and 63,000 photographs. In Georgia O'Keeffe's case, her estate's appraisers established blockage discounts based on solid evidence of market sales, but the IRS used its own valuation and the Tax Court assessed a resulting tax of more than the valuation of the collected works at her death. In Andy Warhol's case Surrogate Court of New York rejected the proposed discounts of Christie's, which averaged 60%. Instead, the court applied an average discount of 25%. The court failed to articulate the specific rationale for its determination, but did state that Warhol was more famous than Smith & O'Keeffe. The court's application of an average discount of 25% has been criticized by attorneys and appraisers because, inter alia, it ignored the necessary time it would take to sell 90,000 pieces of art. Therefore, accountants and estate planners for artists plan with such eventualities in mind.

The IRS has stated that carrying costs and opportunity costs are relevant factors for consideration in blockage discounts, along with time to market.

== See also ==
- Art finance
- Art market
- Art valuation
- Art world economics
- Art work
- Estate planning
- Tax law

== External resources ==
Wadler, The Heirs of George Grosz Battle His Dealer's Ghost; A Protracted Lawsuit Outlives Its Target, But Not Its Anger, The New York Times, August 27, 2001.
