= Timeline of Gloucester, Massachusetts =

This is a timeline of the history of the city of Gloucester, Massachusetts, USA.

== Prior to 19th century ==
- 1606 – Samuel de Champlain anchors in "Beauport."
- 1623 – Dorchester Company settlers arrive and setup at Stage Fort Park.
- 1630 or 1631 – Abraham Robinson, son of John Robinson (pastor), and band of Pilgrims, establishes settlement and fishing stage at Annisquam.
- 1642 – Town of Gloucester incorporated.
- 1660 – Edward Harraden house built.
- 1698 – First school house built, Thomas Riggs first school master.
- 1700 – Congregational Church organized, West Gloucester (approximate date).
- 1709 – Davis-Freeman house built.
- 1710 – White-Ellery House built.
- 1713 – Schooner ship type begins operating.
- 1716 – Second Parish Church incorporated.
- 1720 – Dyke-Wheeler house built.
- 1728 – Third Parish Church established.
- 1739 – "Great meeting-house at the harbor" built.
- 1740 – Babson-Alling house built.
- 1765 – Population: 3,763.
- 1770 – Freemason Tyrian Lodge established.
- 1771 – Cape Ann Light erected on Thacher Island.
- 1775 – Battle of Gloucester.
- 1789 – U.S. custom house established.
- 1790 – Population: 5,317.
- 1792 – Gloucester post office established.
- 1796 – Gloucester Bank established.

== 19th century ==
=== 1800s–1850s ===
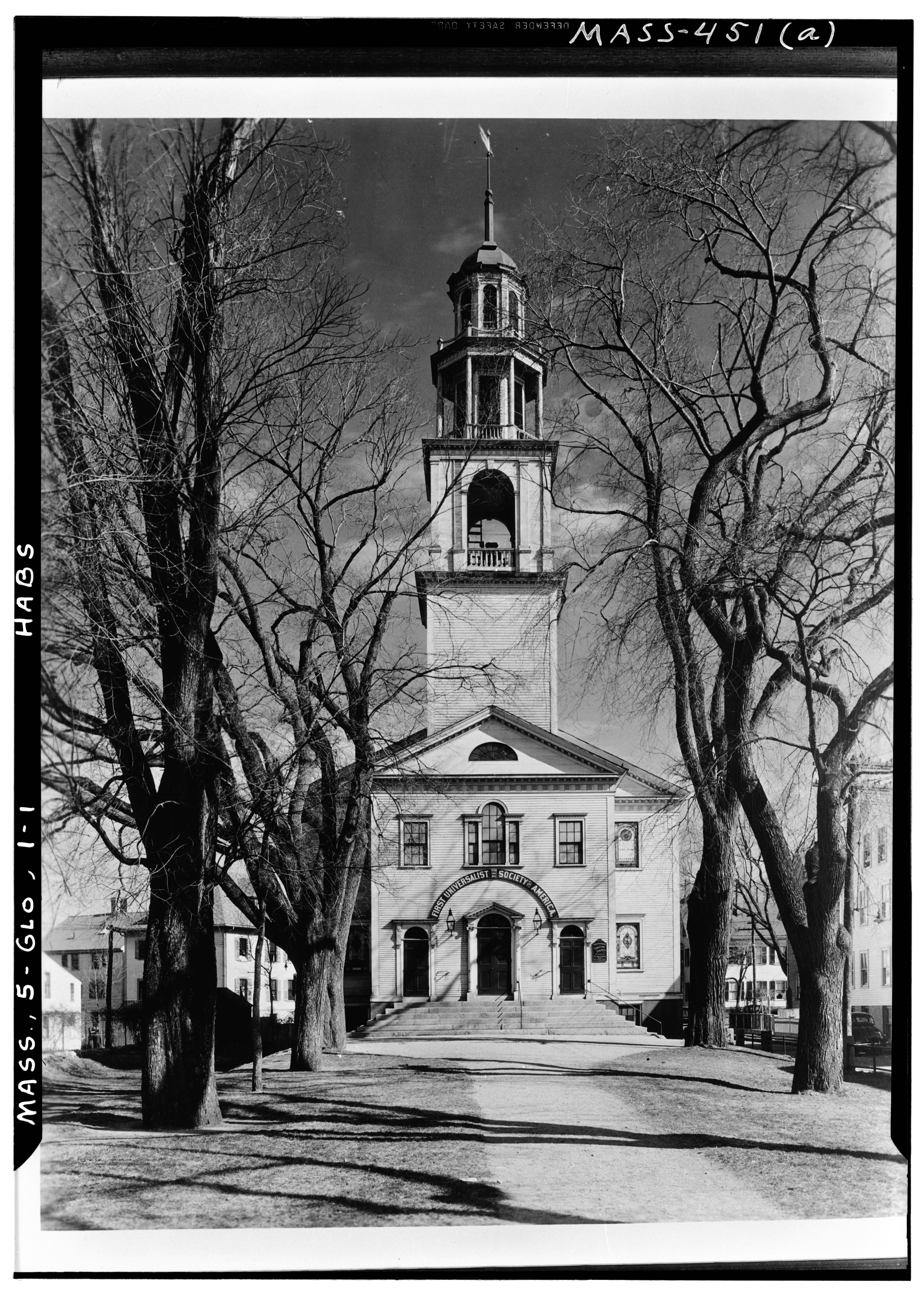
First Universalist Church built on Middle Street, 1806 (photo 1930s)

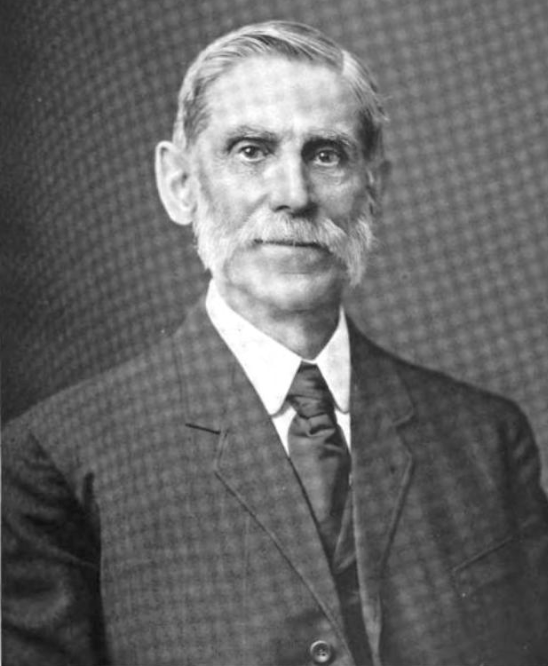
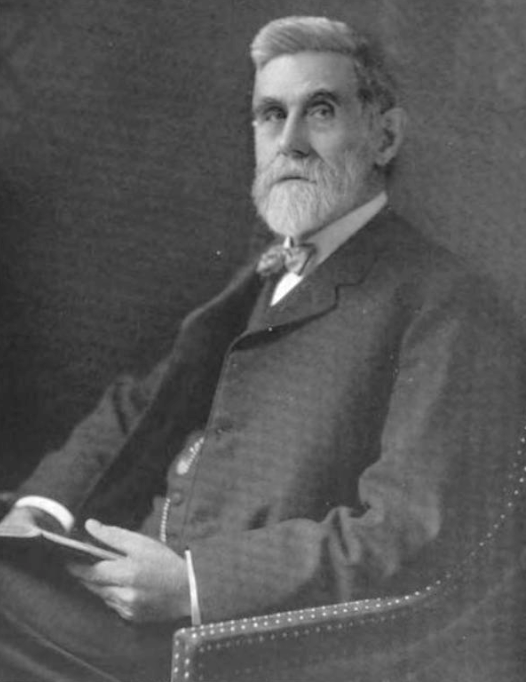
Procter Bros., publishers, est. 1857
- 1801 – Annisquam Harbor Light erected.
- 1805 – Daily Boston-Gloucester stagecoach begins operating.
- 1806 – First Universalist Church built.
- 1808 – First Baptist Church founded.
- 1819 – Nearby Essex incorporated as a town.
- 1821 – Ten Pound Island Light erected.
- 1827 – Gloucester Telegraph newspaper begins publication.
- 1828 – First Parish Church built on Middle Street.
- 1830
  - Gloucester Lyceum and Lanesville Congregational Church established.
  - 30 September: Fire.
  - Population: 7,510.
- 1831 – Eastern Point Light erected.
- 1832 – Gloucester Circulating Library, Front Street, in operation.
- 1834 – Gloucester Democrat newspaper begins publication.
- 1835 – Straitsmouth Island Light erected.
- 1836 – Female Charitable Society organized.
- 1838
  - Methodist Church built.
  - Congregationalist Ladies' Sewing Circle organized.
- 1839 – Annisquam Universalist Ladies' Sewing Circle organized.
- 1840
  - Part of Gloucester becomes the new town of Rockport.
  - Population: 6,350.
- 1842 – Lane's Cove Pier Co. formed.
- 1843 – Cape Ann Light newspaper begins publication.
- 1844 – Town Hall built.
- 1845 – Odd Fellows Ocean Lodge established.
- 1847
  - Railway begins operating.
  - Gloucester Mutual Fishing Insurance Co., Gloucester Marine Insurance Co., and Annisquam Mutual Fire Insurance Co. incorporated.
  - Artist Fitz Hugh Lane moves to town.
- 1848
  - Gloucester News newspaper begins publication.
  - Mount Adnah Cemetery organized.
- 1849 – Fitz Henry Lane house and Pavilion Hotel built.
- 1850
  - Burnham Brothers Marine Railway built.
  - Population: 7,786.
- 1851 – Cape Ann Savings Bank incorporated.
- 1852 – Company G., 8th Regiment organized.
- 1853 – Gloucester Gas Light Company in business.
- 1855
  - Gloucester Cornet Band organized.
  - Cunningham & Thompson in business.
  - Timothy Davis becomes US representative for Massachusetts's 6th congressional district.
- 1856
  - Oak Grove Cemetery, Independent Sons of Temperance, and Cape Ann Bank established.
  - Cape Ann Advertiser newspaper begins publication.
- 1857
  - Procter Brothers in business.
  - Citizens' Library Association organized.
- 1858
  - Police court, Cape Ann Telegraph Co., Congregationalist Young Ladies' Society, and Congregationalist Ladies' Society at the Cove established.
  - East Gloucester Baptist Church built.
- 1859
  - Gloucester Fishermen's Widow's and Orphan's Fund Society; Sons of Temperance, Annisquam Division; Franklin Club; Congregationalist Ladies' Home Missionary Society; and Band of Hope organized.
  - November 2: "Mechanic Engine Co. had a grand parade."

=== 1860s–1890s ===
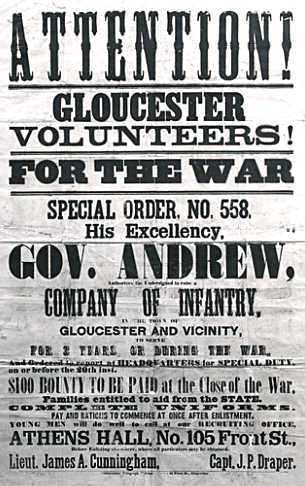
Civil war recruitment poster, ca.1861

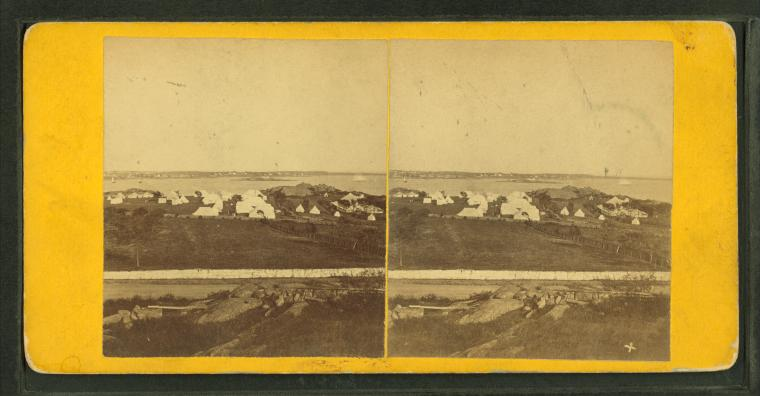
Universalist Centenary camp ground, 1870

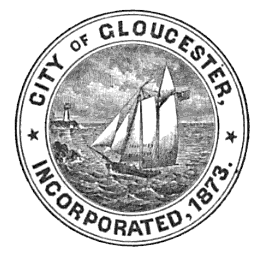
Seal of City of Gloucester, incorporated 1873

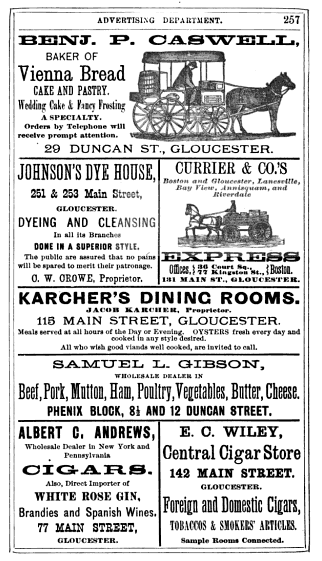
Advertisements for Gloucester businesses, 1882

- 1860 – Population: 10,904.
- 1861 – Railway to Rockport begins operating.
- 1862 – Shute & Merchant in business |url=https://www.shuteandmerchant.com/history-2.html |
- 1864
  - February 18: Fire.
  - First National Bank in business.
- 1865 – Freemason Acacia Lodge established.
- 1866
  - Board of Trade and Cape Ann Horticultural Society established.
  - Cape Ann Anchor & Forge in business.
- 1867
  - North Gloucester Universalist church active.
  - Sylvanus Smith & Co. in business.
- 1869
  - May 16: Town Hall burns down.
  - Cape Ann Granite quarry in business.
- 1870
  - Universalist Centenary.
  - Population: 15,389.
- 1871 – Gloucester City Hall built.
- 1872 – Gloucester Lyceum & Sawyer Free Library incorporated.
- 1873
  - Gloucester becomes a city.
  - Lanesville Granite quarry in business.
  - YMCA and Cape Ann Scientific and Literary Association founded.
- 1874
  - Slade Gorton & Company established.
  - Robert R. Fears becomes first city mayor.
  - Procter Brothers circulating library opens.
- 1877
  - Gloucester Bulletin newspaper begins publication.
  - Artist William Morris Hunt active.
- 1880
  - Sea Side Library in operation.
  - Population: 19,329.
- 1881
  - Gloucester Water Supply Co. incorporated.
  - Harbor Methodist Church built.
  - Gloucester Isinglass and Glue in business.
- 1882 – Russia Cement Co. in business.
- 1884
  - Gloucester News and Cape Ann Breeze newspapers begin publication.
  - Tarr and Wonson paint factory built.
  - Magonolia Library Association formed.
- 1885
  - October 16: North Shore Tricycle Run arrives in Gloucester.
  - Horse-drawn Gloucester Street Railway begins operating.
- 1887 – Magnolia Congregational Church and Gloucester Co-operative Bank established.
- 1888
  - Gloucester Daily Times newspaper begins publication.
  - Gloucester Electric Co. in business.
- 1891
  - Gloucester Safe Deposit and Trust in business.
  - Hawthorne Inn built.
- 1892
  - 250th anniversary of incorporation of town of Gloucester.
  - Gloucester Towboat Co. in business.
- 1895
  - Gloucester, Essex and Beverly Street Railway begins operating.
  - American Halibut Co. in business.
- 1896 – Eliot house (residence) built.
- 1897 – Addison Gilbert Hospital built.
- 1898
  - S.S. Portland shipwreck.
  - Business Men's Association formed.
- 1899 – Ravenswood Park established.
- 1900 – Population: 26,121.

== 20th century ==
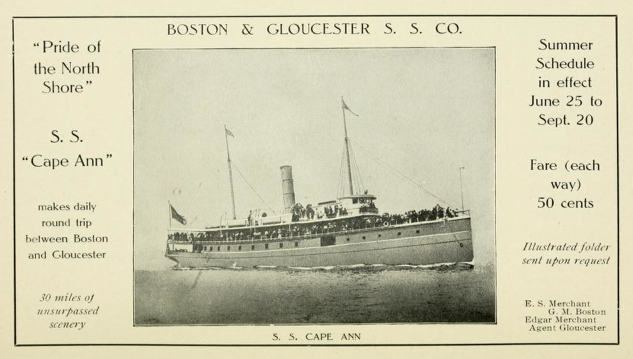
S.S. Cape Ann ferry, 1905

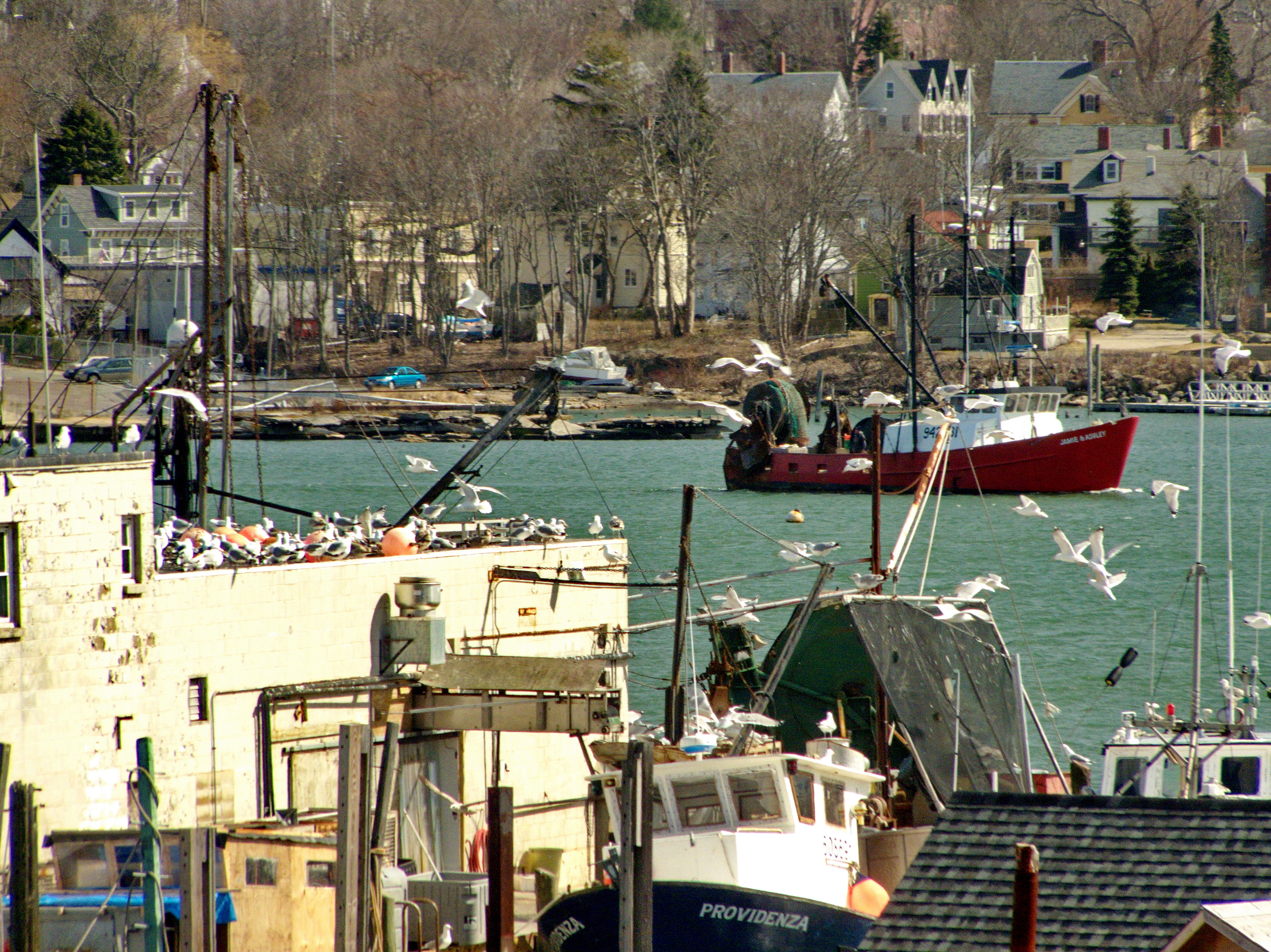
Gloucester, Massachusetts, 2010

- 1902 – Cape Pond Ice Co. in business.
- 1905 – Gloucester Cold Storage in business.
- 1906 – Gorton-Pew Fisheries in business.
- 1907
  - Gloucester Net and Twine Company in business.
  - Beauport, Sleeper-McCann House expanded.
  - Shute & Merchant became the fifth firm to join the Gorton-Pew Fisheries Company
- 1914
  - Our Lady of Good Voyage Church rebuilt.
  - Synagogue active.
- 1920 – Population: 22,947.
- 1921 – Chamber of Commerce established.
- 1922 – North Shore Art Association founded.
- 1923
  - Tercentenary of European settlement of Gloucester.
  - Gloucester Tercentenary Permanent Memorial Association selects Leonard Craske's design for the Gloucester Fisherman's Memorial.
- 1925 – General Seafood Corporation in business.
- 1926 – Adventure (schooner) launched.
- 1927 – St. Peter's Fiesta started.
- 1929 – Hammond Castle built.
- 1931 – Greasy Pole contest started. Held yearly at the St. Peter's Fiesta a five-day festival honoring the patron saint of the fisherman, St. Peter. Hosted by the Italian American community of Gloucester.
- 1943 – WPA murals painted in City Hall.
- 1969 – Gloucester Fishermen's Wives Association founded.
- 1976 – Citizens voted to change the City Charter replacing a city manager with a mayor elected every two years. Leo Alper was the first mayor elected under the new city charter.
- 1979 – Gloucester Stage Company founded.
- 1984 – Richard Silva elected mayor.
- 1988 – William Squillace elected mayor.
- 1991
  - October 28: Ship Andrea Gail lost at sea in the 1991 Perfect Storm.
  - Bruce Tobey becomes mayor.
- 1992 – William S. Rafter Jr. becomes mayor.
- 1994 – Bruce Tobey becomes mayor again.
- 1997 – John F. Tierney becomes US representative for Massachusetts's 6th congressional district.
- 1998 – City website online (approximate date).

== 21st century ==
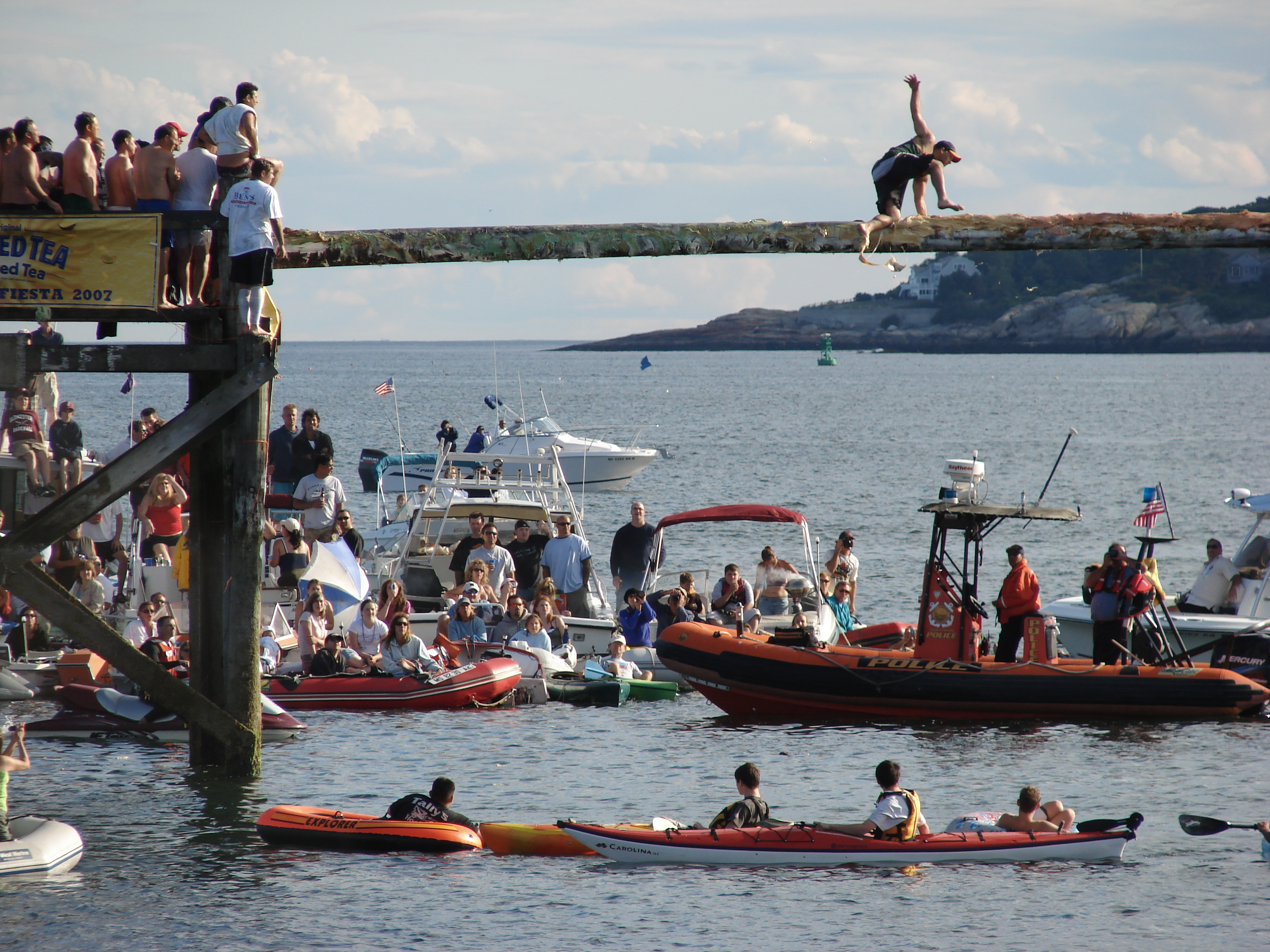
A man attempts to reach the flag during the Greasy Pole contest on Sunday, July 1, 2007.

- 2002
  - North Shore North newspaper begins.
  - John Bell becomes mayor.
- 2003 – Gloucester Island News newspaper begins.
- 2004 – Sister city relationship established with Tamano, Japan.
- 2007 – Good Morning Gloucester blog begins publication.
- 2008
  - Teen pregnancy controversy occurs.
  - Carolyn Kirk becomes mayor.
- 2010 – Population: 28,789.
- 2013 – Gloucester Marine Genomics Institute (GMGI) founded.
- 2015
  - Police department program for drug addicts begins.
  - Sefatia Romeo Theken becomes mayor.
  - Seth Moulton becomes US representative for Massachusetts's 6th congressional district.
- 2026
  - January 30: Fishing vessel Lily Jean sinks off coast of Gloucester.

== See also ==
- Gloucester history
- List of mayors of Gloucester, Massachusetts
- Timelines of other municipalities in Essex County, Massachusetts: Haverhill, Lawrence, Lynn, Newburyport, Salem

== Bibliography ==
published in the 18th–19th century

- Jedidiah Morse (1797), "Gloucester", American Gazetteer, Boston: At the presses of S. Hall, and Thomas & Andrews
- John James Babson (1860), History of the Town of Gloucester, Cape Anne, including the Town of Rockport, Gloucester: Procter Brothers, OL 23608944M
- Gloucester Directory. 1860.
- "An American Fishing Port". Lippincott's Monthly Magazine. 1: 497–505. May 1868. hdl:2027/uc1.b5213322.
- "General Directory: Gloucester". Essex-County History and Directory. Boston: C.A. & J.F. Wood. 1870. pp. 248–279 – via Google Books.
- George Henry Procter (1873). Fishermen's Memorial and Record Book: Containing a List of Vessels and Their Crews Lost from the Port of Gloucester from the Year 1830 to October 1, 1873. Procter Brothers.
- Annual Report of the City of Gloucester, 1874 (ongoing).
  - 1893, 1894
- "Gloucester and Cape Ann". Harper's New Monthly Magazine. 51 (304): 465–474. September 1875. hdl:2027/hvd.hnybhy.
- Fisheries of Gloucester from the First Catch by the English in 1623, to the Centennial Year, 1876. Procter Brothers. 1876.
- Benjamin D. Hill; Winfield S. Nevins (1881). "Gloucester". North Shore of Massachusetts Bay: An Illustrated Guide to Marblehead, Salem, Peabody, Beverly, Manchester-by-the-Sea, Magnolia, Gloucester, Rockport, and Ipswich (4th ed.).
- Gloucester Directory, Boston: Sampson, Davenport & Co., 1882 – via HathiTrust
- Atlas of the City of Gloucester and Town of Rockport, Massachusetts. Philadelphia: Hopkins. 1884 – via State Library of Massachusetts.
- Gloucester Directory, Boston: Sampson, Davenport, & Co., 1884 – via Internet Archive
- History of the Town and City of Gloucester, Cape Ann, Massachusetts, Gloucester, Mass.: James R. Pringle, 1892, OCLC 3714229, OL 7094440M
- Gloucester Fire Department: its History and Work from 1793 to 1893, Gloucester, Mass.: Steam Fire Assoc., 1892, OL 23389110M
- Official Souvenir, 250th Anniversary, Gloucester, MA, 1892, OL 14032003M
- Rudyard Kipling (1896). "Captains Courageous". McClure's. (children's fiction)
- Gloucester Directory, Boston: Sampson, Murdock, & Co., 1899 – via Internet Archive

published in the 20th–21st century

- Annual Report of the City of Gloucester (ongoing).
  - 1900, 1903, 1905, 1909
  - 1911, 1916
  - 1920, 1922
- Memorial of the Celebration of the Two Hundred and Fiftieth Anniversary of the Incorporation of the Town of Gloucester, Mass. August, 1892. Boston: A. Mudge & Son. 1901.
- James R. Coffin (1910). "Le Beau Port: the sea-browned fishing town of Gloucester". New England Magazine. 42. hdl:2027/mdp.39015023263083.
- Commonwealth of Massachusetts, Bureau of Statistics (1913). "Classification by Cities and Towns: Gloucester". Directory of Massachusetts Manufactures. Boston: Wright & Potter. pp. 152–153. hdl:2027/mdp.39015076394553 – via HathiTrust.
- Benjamin F. Arrington, ed. (1922). "City of Gloucester". Municipal History of Essex County in Massachusetts. Vol. 2. New York: Lewis Historical Publishing Company.
- Federal Writers' Project (1937), "Gloucester and Rockport", Massachusetts: a Guide to its Places and People, American Guide Series, Boston: Houghton Mifflin, hdl:2027/mdp.39015014440781. + Chronology
- H. Barbara Weinberg; et al. (1994). "Urban Leisure: Gloucester: a durable magnet for American painters of modern life". American Impressionism and Realism: The Painting of Modern Life, 1885–1915. NY: Metropolitan Museum of Art. ISBN 978-0-87099-700-6.
- John Hardy Wright (2000). Gloucester and Rockport. Images of America. Arcadia Publishing. ISBN 978-0-7385-3911-9.
- Mary Ray (2002). Sarah V. Dunlap (ed.). Gloucester, Massachusetts Historical Time-Line 1000-1999. Mary Ray. ISBN 978-0-9722416-0-1.
