= List of shipwrecks of Massachusetts =

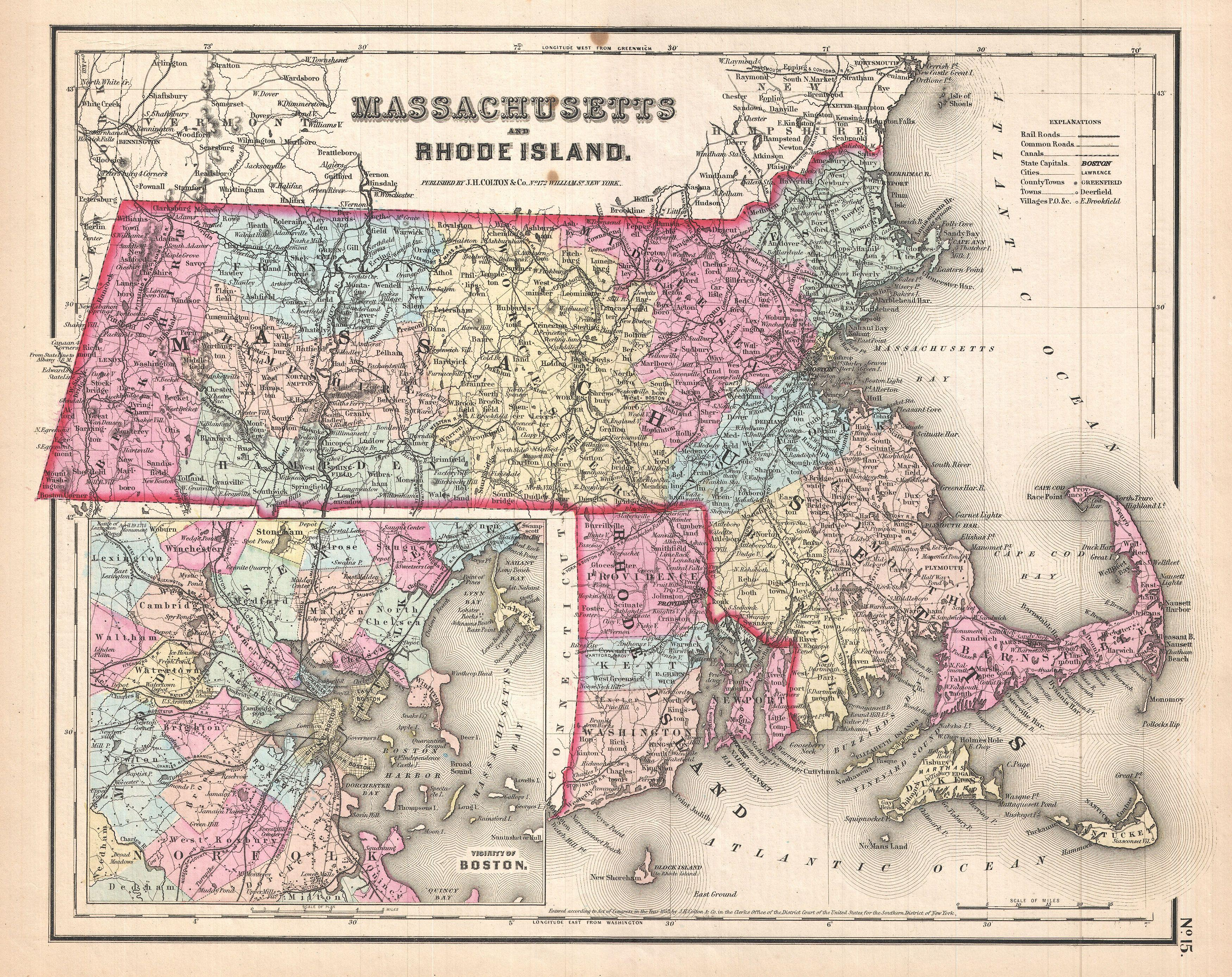
Map of Massachusetts and Rhode Island, 1857

This is a list of shipwrecks located off the coast of Massachusetts.

== Barnstable County ==
Due to its dangerously hidden and constantly moving shoals located just off-shore, Cape Cod's coastline from Chatham to Provincetown – a mere fifty-mile stretch of sea – has been called an "ocean graveyard", containing over 3,000 shipwrecks.

Ship	Flag	Sunk date	Notes	Coordinates
Alva		25 July 1892	A luxury yacht that was rammed in fog by the steamer H. F. Dimock off Chatham.	
Aransas		7 May 1905	A passenger steamer that collided with the schooner barge Glendower in fog, off Chatham.	
USS Bancroft	United States Navy	July 1945	A Clemson-class destroyer that sank in a collision off Cape Cod.	
Dixie Sword		12 February 1942	A cargo ship that foundered in a storm off Monomoy Island, and is thought to have been torpedoed.	41°32′58″N 69°58′50″W
Emmy Rose		November 23, 2020	An 82-foot (25 m) long fishing vessel, lost in a storm about 20 miles (32 km) northeast of Provincetown, Massachusetts with four crew members aboard, all presumed deceased.	
General Greene	United States Coast Guard	6 March 1960	A United States Coast Guard Cutter that was blown onto a beach at Sandwich while disabled in storm.	
Horatio Hall		10 March 1909	A steamship that collided in fog with the freighter H. F. Dimock, 3 miles (4.8 km) east of Chatham.	
James Longstreet	United States		A Liberty ship that ran aground in 1943, and was used as a target ship until 1971.	41°49′53.27″N 70°02′39.28″W
Kate Harding		30 November 1892	A bark that was beached in a storm, near Cape Cod Light.	
Montclair		4 March 1927	A schooner that ran aground off Nauset Light in a storm.	
Monticello	United States	Unknown	A ship that served in the Quasi-War, which was decommissioned and wrecked off Cape Cod.	42.126°N 69.749°W
Paul Palmer	United States	15 June 1913	A schooner that caught fire and sank off Provincetown.	
Peace and Prosperity		2 January 1784	A brig shipwrecked off of Truro under Captain John Callahan. Passengers included John Wheelock and James Wheelock who were returning from a fundraising tour in Europe for Dartmouth College, they lost all of their papers and the money raised in the wreck.	
Pendleton	United States	18 February 1952	A tanker that broke in half in a storm, one mile (1.6 km) east of Monomoy Island.	41°35′10″N 69°57′45″W
HMS Somerset	Royal Navy	2 November 1778	A third-rate ship of the line that ran aground in a storm off Provincetown.	42°4′34″N 70°8′53″W
USS Thresher	United States Navy	10 April 1963	The first submarine in her class, sank during deep-diving trials after flooding, loss of propulsion, and a failed attempt to blow the emergency ballast tanks, causing it to exceed crush depth. All 129 on board died, including shipyard personnel supporting the deep-diving tests.	
Whydah Gally	Pirate	26 April 1717	The flagship of the pirate Samuel Bellamy, which sank in a storm off Marconi Beach, claiming the lives of Bellamy and most of his crew.	41°53′31″N 69°57′34″W

== Bristol County ==
Ship	Flag	Sunk date	Notes	Coordinates
Angela		4 March 1971	A cement barge that broke its towline in a storm and grounded on a reef off Westport.	41°27′40″N 71°02′02″W
City of Taunton	United States	1930s	A steamship that was beached at Somerset and abandoned.	41°42′39″N 71°10′33″W
Colonel William B. Cowin		17 December 1941	A ferry that struck Hens and Chickens Reef off Westport and sank quickly.	41°28.3′N 70°58.8′W
Hilda Garston		20 February 1961	A dredger that struck a reef off Westport.	41°16.4′N 71°02.1′W
USS Yankee	United States Navy	23 September 1908	A steamboat that sank in Buzzards Bay while under tow.	

== Dukes County ==
Ship	Flag	Sunk date	Notes	Coordinates
Ardandhu		23 January 1900	A cargo ship that collided in fog with the steamer Herman Winter in Vineyard Sound.	41°26′30″N 70°48′00″W
City of Columbus	United States	18 January 1884	A steamboat that ran aground on Devil's Bridge, off Aquinnah.	41°21′36″N 70°50′55″W
Dynafuel	United States	15 November 1963	A tanker that collided with Norwegian freighter Fernview northwest of Pasque Island.	41°28′18″N 70°51′12″W
Herman Winter		7 March 1944	A steamship that was stranded on Devils Bridge reef, off Martha's Vineyard.	41°20′57″N 70°50′50″W
John S. Dwight		6 April 1923	A rum runner that was scuttled south of Nashawena Island.	41°23′26″N 70°52′36″W
Leonardo		24 November 2019	A 57-foot (17 m) scallop fishing vessel that capsized and sank during a powerful storm off the coast of Martha's Vineyard with four crew members aboard. Only one survivor was found, and the other three are presumed deceased.	
Mertie B. Crowley		23 January 1910	A schooner that ran aground on Wasque Shoal, off Martha's Vineyard.	
Nantucket	United States	7 August 1859	A whaler that was wrecked on Nashawena Island.	
USS Valor	United States Navy	29 June 1944	An Accentor-class minesweeper sunk by USS Richard W. Suesens off Cuttyhunk.	41°28′N 70°57′W

== Essex County ==
Ship	Flag	Sunk date	Notes	Coordinates
Ada K. Damon	United States	26 December 1909	A Grand Banks schooner that wrecked on Crane Beach in Ipswich, Massachusetts.	42°41′28.14″N 70°46′58.14″W
USS Albert Gallatin	United States Navy	6 January 1892	A cutter that grounded on Boo Hoo Ledge off Manchester.	42°33′50″N 70°44′52″W
Alice M. Colburn		3 January 1923	A schooner that ran aground and broke up in a storm off Manchester.	
Alma A. E. Holmes	United States	10 October 1914	A schooner that collided with the steamer Belfast off Marblehead.	42°26′6″N 70°44′54″W
California		15 September 1955	A fishing trawler that ran aground on a ledge off Rockport.	42°40′25″N 70°34′19″W
Charles S. Haight		1946	A cargo ship that was stranded on a ledge off Rockport.	42°40′38″N 70°35′03″W
Chelsea		10 February 1957	A tanker that was grounded on the Sandy Bay Breakwater northeast of Thatcher Island.	42°38′52″N 70°34′11″W
Chester A. Poling		10 January 1977	An oil tanker that broke in half in a storm, southwest of Eastern Point Light.	
Edward Rich		30 August 1899	A schooner that struck the Sandy Bay Breakwater off Rockport in fog.	42°40′39″N 70°35′25″W
Ellenora Van Dusen		20 September 1900	A schooner that caught fire and sank in Gloucester Harbor.	
Frank A. Palmer	United States	17 December 1902	A schooner that collided with Louise B. Crary off Gloucester.	
USS Grouse	United States Navy	21 September 1963	A YMS-1-class minesweeper that ran aground off Rockport.	42°40′24″N 70°34′29″W
Herbert		5 August 1924	A lighter that was rammed in fog by the steamer City of Gloucester while at anchor off Nahant.	42°25′05″N 70°51′25″W
Jennie M. Carter		13 April 1894	A schooner smashed into one of the jetties in a storm off Salisbury.	
Joffre	United States	9 August 1947	A schooner that caught fire and sank off Gloucester. The wreck was discovered in 2006.	
Lamartine	United States	17 May 1893	A schooner that sank in a storm off Gloucester. The wreck was discovered in 2004.	
Louise B. Crary	United States	1902	A schooner that collided with Frank A. Palmer off Gloucester.	
Margaret	United States	7 January 1796	A former maritime fur trade ship sold to new owners in 1794 and wrecked in 1796 on Gooseberry Rocks, near Gooseberry Island.	
Monohansett	United States	June 1904	A paddle steamer that sank off Salem Harbor.	
USS New Hampshire	United States Navy	26 July 1922	A training ship that caught fire and sank in the Hudson River on 23 May 1921. She was raised and sold for scrap, but caught fire again and sank while under tow off Manchester.	43°4′18″N 70°45′47″W
USS Nezinscot	United States Navy	11 August 1907	The navy tug was steaming from Portsmouth to Boston carrying a cargo of chains, anchors and search light equipment for USS Missouri. She capsized and sank when a deck load shifted in heavy seas off Cape Ann. Of the nine-person crew, there were four fatalities.	
Nina T		September 1997	A fishing trawler that was scuttled off Gloucester.	42°34.133′N 70°40.522′W
Northern Voyager		1997	A factory ship that foundered during sea trials after refit, two point five miles (4.0 km) east of Eastern Point Light.	42°34.451′N 070°36.295′W
Portland	United States	27 November 1898	A steamship that sank off Cape Ann in the Portland Gale.	

== Nantucket County ==
Ship	Flag	Sunk date	Notes	Coordinates	
Alice M. Lawrence		5 December 1914	A schooner that was grounded on Tuckernuck Shoal, in Nantucket Sound. The vessel grounded upon the wreck of French Van Gilder (see below).	41°24′13″N 70°13′00″W	
Andrea Doria	Italy	26 July 1956	An Andrea Doria-class ocean liner capsized and sunk after colliding with Stockholm.	40°29′24″N 69°51′2″W	
Argo Merchant	Liberia	December 1976	An oil tanker that ran aground 25 miles (40 km) southeast of Nantucket, Massachusetts, causing an oil spill.	41.033°N 69.45°W	
Edward E. Briry		15 December 1917	A schooner that foundered in a gale six miles (9.7 km) northeast of Great Point Light.		
Fort Mercer		18 February 1952	A tanker that broke in half in heavy seas southeast of Nantucket.		
French Van Gilder		29 March 1885	A schooner that was grounded on Tuckernuck Shoal in Nantucket Sound.	41°24.1′N 70°13′W	
Jennie French Potter		18 May 1909	A schooner that was grounded on Halfmoon Shoal in Nantucket Sound.	41°28′28″N 70°16′38″W	
Kershaw		1 June 1928	A cargo ship that collided with the liner President Garfield northeast of East Chop Light.	41°28.9′N 70°31.9′W	
LV-58	United States	11 December 1905	A lightvessel that started to leak and sank while being towed off Nantucket.		
LV-117	United States	15 May 1934	A lightvessel that was rammed by RMS Olympic off Nantucket.	40°37′2″N 69°37′6″W	
North American	United States	4 September 1967	A steamboat that sank under tow off Nantucket.	42°11′00″N 87°39′00″W	Coords = off Chicago, Lake Michigan. (?)
Pemberton		13 February 1907	A schooner that caught fire and sank northeast of Nobska Light.	41°30′59″N 70°37′41″W	
RawFaith	United States	8 December 2010	A wheelchair-accessible galleon that sank off Nantucket.		
RMS Republic	United Kingdom	24 January 1909	A steam-powered ocean liner that collided with Florida south of Nantucket Island.	40°26′03″N 69°46′0″W	
Stephano	United Kingdom	8 October 1916	Torpedoed by and sunk by U-53, 2.5 miles (4.0 km) east-north-east of Nantucket.		
U-550	Kriegsmarine	16 April 1944	A Type IXC/40 U-boat sunk by USS Joyce off Nantucket.	40°09′N 69°44′W	
Unnamed crane barge		1 November 1963	A crane barge that foundered in Nantucket Sound.	41°26′03″N 70°13′28″W	

== Plymouth County ==
Ship	Flag	Sunk date	Notes	Coordinates
Ann	United States	28 January 1805	A brig that was drove ashore at Duxbury Beach in the Blizzard of 1805. "Loss of Brig Ann. A gentleman, arrived in town [Boston], last evening from Duxbury, informs, that the brig Ann, Capt. Lathrop, was drove on shore, at Duxbury Beach, on Monday night last, about 11 o'clock. The crew got on shore safe, and it is expected the cargo will be saved. The Ann is owned by Mr. William Parsons, of this town [Boston]. Capt Lothrop, informs, that she saw a brig on shore at Race Point, [Provincetown] as he passed that place, but could not understand who she was."	
Ceres		28 January 1805	A ship that went shore on Salt House Beach off Marshfield and Duxbury in the Blizzard of 1805. "A new ship went ashore on Salt House Beach, a few hours before the loss of the Hibernia; this intelligence is corroborated by Mr. Payne, the surviving mate of the above vessel, who stated to our informant, that he saw her driving towards the shore, and that she is the Ceres, Capt. Sampson, who sailed in company with the Hibernia, from this place, for Charleston. No further particulars of the situation of the ship or crew have been received."	
Columbia		March 1792	A ship that was stranded on High Pines, a section of Duxbury beach off the Gurnet. "In March 1792, the ship Columbia, of three hundred tons, of Portland, Capt. Isaac Chauncy, was stranded on the beach at the High Pines, and fourteen men lost, and two, the second mate and a boy, were saved."	
Columbia	United States	26 November 1898	A schooner that was blown onto the beach at Scituate in the Portland Gale.	
Delaware		27 November 1898	A barge that sank off Scituate in the Portland Gale.	
Edna G.	United States	June 1988	A fishing vessel that sank near Stellwagen Bank.	
Favorite		28 January 1805	A ship Favorite bilged off Rocky Point, Plymouth in the Blizzard of 1805. "Boston, January 31. Loss of Ship Favorite. The ship Favorite, Nathaniel M. Perley, master, sailed from hence, on Saturday morning, for Lisbon: After standing off with a light breeze from 11 A.M. until 8 P.M. the wind beginning to haul to the N.E. and coming on to snow, the weather very thick. Capt. Perley thought best to heave about and stand in, and endeavor to make a harbor - he run in about a mile above the light and came too, with both anchors ahead, rode until five o'clock, on Monday Morning, it then blowing very hard from E. N. E. the ship parted both cables, and in 10 minutes struck on Rocky Point, and is bilged; it is expected a large part of the cargo will be saved."	
Forest Queen		29 February 1853	A cargo ship that grounded off Second Cliff Beach, Scituate, in a storm.	
Franklin		October 1804	A schooner wrecked off High Pines, Duxbury in the Snow Hurricane of 1804. "Further Accounts of the Late Storm... A wreck was seen near the high pines, after the gale; has since been towed into Plymouth; proves to be the schooner Franklin, of Falmouth; about 100 tons. The body of a seaman has been found on the Outer Beach, two others have been found in the wreck."	
General Arnold		25 December 1778	An American brig that shipwrecked in Plymouth Bay during the Revolutionary War in a blizzard. "On Friday the 25th ult. at 6 A.M. the wind to the westward, sailed from this port the brig General Arnold, James Magee, commander; and about meridian the wind chop'd round to N.E. and looking likely for a gale they thought best to put into Plymouth, and came to anchor in a place called the Cow Yard. On Saturday, the gale encreasing, she started from her anchor, and struck on the White Flat; they then cut both cables and masts away, in hopes to drive over but she immediately bilged; it being low water, left her quarter-deck dry, where all hands got relief. A schooner lying within hail, heard their cries, but could not assist them. On Saturday the inhabitants were cutting ice most of the day before they got on board, when they saw 75 of the men had perished, and 34 very much froze, which they got on shore; and on Monday they got on shore and buried the dead. Great part of the brig's stores will be saved."	
Henry Endicott		18 September 1939	A schooner that foundered southeast of Manomet while under tow in heavy seas.	41°54′30″N 70°29′08″W
Hibernia		28 January 1805	Loss of Ship Hibernia in the Blizzard of 1805. "The Hibernia, Capt. Farrill, also sailed from this port for Trinidad, on Saturday last. By a gentleman, arrived in town yesterday express from Plymouth, we learn, that the above ship drove ashore at that place, a mile and a half to the south of the Point - she is parted, and her stern drove about a quarter of a mile from her head; the cargo which was in her stern, is scattered along the shore; that in her bows being principally hogsheads, is still in her. The Capt. and all the crew, excepting the first mate, perished." "The Captain and all her crew, excepting her first mate, perished, viz, Andrew Farrill, master, of Boston; William Payne, first mate, formerly of Wellfleet, but now of Boston, the only survivor who was lashed to the helm, and taken from thence almost lifeless; Joseph Cordis, second mate, of Charlestown; and the following seamen, viz James D. Hammond of Marblehead, Ezra Bicknall of Weymouth, John Smith of Boston, Samuel Carter of Philadelphia, John Smith of Newport, Thomas Brown of Gloucester, William Howard, boy, of New York, and Francis Trask Cook of Newburyport."	
Kenwood		4 February 1926	A schooner that was blown onto rocks in a gale, north of Cedar Point, Scituate.	
Mars		13 September 1942	A tug that collided with the tanker Bidwell east of Manomet.	41°56′16″N 70°29′33″W
USS Mohave	United States Navy	13 February 1928	An Arapaho-class fleet tug that struck a submerged ledge near Nantasket Beach.	42°18′18″N 70°50′52″W
Nancy		20 February 1927	A schooner that dragged her anchor onto Nantasket Beach in a storm.	
Pemberton		13 February 1907	A (coal) schooner barge that burned and sank Nobska Light, Woods Hole.	
Prudence		5 December 1800	A sloop cast ashore off High Pines Ledge on Duxbury Beach. "Duxbury, December 7. Mr. Russell, On the night of the 5th instant, the sloop Prudence, Captain Alexander Gardner, of Nantucket, was cast ashore and stranded, on the beach, two miles north of Plymouth Light House. There were five men on board; the mate and a passenger was saved, the Captain and his son [Charles Gardner] was found dead; the others not yet found. The cargo consisted of fifteen hogsheads spermaceti oil, 100 barrels tar, and the rigging and sails of the ship Charles, which was cast away near Nantucket - all of which will be saved with little damage. It is not known by the mate who the oil belongs to; it will be forwarded to Boston immediately. Your humble servant, Reuben Drew."	
Rodney	Great Britain	25 November 1792	A ship that shipwrecked on Duxbury beach. "Tribute of Gratitude. George Whytock, commander of the ship Rodney, of London, which sailed from Boston, on Thursday the 22d of November, and unfortunately was shipwrecked on Duxburough beach, the Sunday morning following, in the severe snowstorm, takes this public method to return his most grateful thanks to the benevolent people of Duxborough, Marshfield, and their vicinities, for their humane, spirited, and generousexertions, in affording him and his crew their assistance, in their distressing calamity. To ALL this tribute is sincerely proffered, and particularly to Captain Samuel Debona [sic, Delano], of Duxburough, for his singularly benevolent, noble, and spirited exertions, who at the risk of his own life, ventured into the boisterous waves, and providentially reached the wreck, for the kind purpose of preventing the sufferers attempting to land in their then situation, but to wait until the tide would admit of their getting safely on shore, and to inspire their almost exhausted spirits every possible degree of fortitude, with the assurance of a ready assistance as soon as it was possible for help to reach them from the beach. (Signed) GEORGE WHYTOCK for himself, family, and ship's company." "Nov. 25, 1792, the ship Rodney, of London, of between four and five hundred tons, Capt. Whytock, was cast ashore on the Branches ledge in a northeast storm, on her passage from Boston for Martinique, and loaded with lumber and brick. There were no deaths. Capt. Samuel Delano Jr., of Duxbury, while endeavoring to render her assistance, scarcely escaped drowning, and for his heroic conduct was rewarded by the Humane Society with a gold medal. Her passengers were rescued by a sloop, and among their number were several females, the Captain's family."	
Success	United States	December 1811	A brig that wrecked on Brant Rock, Marshfield. "FATAL SHIPWRECK. The Brig Success, Tobias Lear Porter, master, belonging to Messrs. J. & S. White of Salem, 84 days from St. Petersburg, on Wednesday evening last, struck on the Brant rock, Marshfield beach, by which accident the Captain, mate, and four seamen perished, two only being saved. The names of those lost besides the master, are, Mr. John Nichols of Salem, mate; Peter Union, John Chappell, Williams Brooks, and Giles Pike of Marblehead, seamen. Capt. Porter (in whose death society has lost a very respectable, enterprising, and valuable member) was son to the Rev. Nathaniel Porter, of Conway, N.H., a clergyman much respected for learning, and venerable for his age and piety. It appeared that on the approach of night, the wind blowing fresh at the eastward, Capt. Porter consulting his mate on the expediency of running in for the land, they being very short of water, having but about 3 gallons on board, and as they supposed they knew their situation (having spoken a vessel out for the land that day) on mutual deliberation concluded to run in; sounding several times in the evening until they shoaled the water to 17 fathoms. Concluding that they were on the northern shore they hauled off to the southward; shortly after they sounded and had 40 fathom water; continued their course to the southward until nearly 8 o'clock P.M. when they saw breakers, and immediately were ship and stood off - directly after which she struck. After beating for two hours she bilged and filled the cabin with water: the mate and people then left the cabin (except the two that were saved) and went forward and lashed themselves [to] the bows, being then quite out of water; sometime after the bows settled away in the cavity of the rocks, when all those lashed forward were drowned; the captain continued about the decks doing everything in his power for the preservation of the whole until after three o'clock A.M.; he then called to the people that were holding on the combings of the companion way, and asked if they were alive; they answered, though the water was nearly up to their mouths; in a few moments he was heard no more. His body was taken up together with those of the mate and the people that morning, and on the following Sabbath were carried into the meeting-house, where a sermon adapted to the occasion was preached to a large concourse of people by the Rev. Mr. Shaw, from Prov. xxvii 1 "Boast not thyself of tomorrow, for thou knowest not what a day may bring forth," when the bodies were interred."	
Unknown sloop		16 November 1766	An unknown sloop lost off Duxbury. "Boston, November 24... We hear from Duxbury, that in the storm last Sabbath night the 16th instant, a sloop from the Eastward laden with lumber bound in there, where she was owned, one Ripley, master, was cast away on Duxbury Beach, and all the hands (being three in number) perished, viz, [William] Ripley, master, John Alden, son of Briggs Alden Esq. of Duxbury, and Daniel Weston. One of the dead bodies was found lashed to the quarter, and another floated ashore, the third was not found."	
Unknown sloop	United States	28 October 1767	A sloop from Connecticut off Duxbury. "Boston, November 5. Last week we had a very heavy storm of wind and rain, the severity of it was on Wednesday, no great damage down in this Harbour; but in the Bay the wind being violent at N.E. many vessels were in great distress. It is said 17 sail, chiefly sloops, were drove on the Southern Shore [including]... a sloop near Duxbury, the vessel, cargo, and all the people lost; two dead bodies have been taken up, several chests, some bedding, great quantities of cheese, butter, cyder &c. were washed a-shore, by which it is supposed she was from Connecticut; but have not learnt the Master's name." "The vessel that was cast away at Duxbury, in a violent storm as lately mentioned in the papers, every soul on board perished, viz Thomas Griffin, master, Jonathan Babcock, James Miner, John Irish, and two others, whose names we have not yet learnt."	
Unknown sloop	United States	28 October 1767	A sloop from North Carolina off Marshfield. "Boston, November 5. Last week we had a very heavy storm of wind and rain, the severity of it was on Wednesday, no great damage down in this Harbour; but in the Bay the wind being violent at N.E. many vessels were in great distress. It is said 17 sail, chiefly sloops, were drove on the Southern Shore [including]... A sloop, Andrews, master, from North Carolina, ashore near Marshfield, the vessel lost but the cargo saved."	
Unknown sloop		9 December 1786	A sloop ran ashore on Duxbury Beach during The Great Snow of 1786. "Boston, December 22. Among the many terrible effects of the late violent snow storm, a correspondent, who was personally concerned, has sent us the following: "Between one and two o'clock, Saturday morning, December 9, Capt. Samuel Robbins sailed from the Long Wharf in Boston, in a coasting sloop, bound for Plymouth, with a number of passengers on board, among whom were the Rev. Mr. Robbins of Plymouth, with 13 others; the wind about N by E. We had passed the light house about two leagues, when the wind veering round to E.N.E the heavens grew suddenly black and a squall of snow."	
Unknown sloop		10 April 1801	A sloop wrecked off Duxbury Beach. "Duxbury Mass. April 13. On Friday afternoon last was discovered at anchor a sloop of about 70 or 80 tons, about half a mile off Duxbury beach; on which there went off some men in a boat. They found no person on board; but a rauses boat with three oars was discovered which was supposed to belong to her. On Saturday morning the sloop disappeared. On that morning the body of a drowned man was taken up on the beach; and the next day two others were taken up. There was nothing found with them to discover who they were or from whence they came, except a watch, with A. S. engraved on it, should do it. It is conjectured she belonged to the Eastward." "In April 1801, a sloop was wrecked, and three men drowned and two saved."	
Unknown schooner		28 January 1805	A schooner wrecked near Rocky Point, Plymouth in the Blizzard of 1805. "At the same time [of the wrecking of Hibernia] a schooner, name unknown, was drove on shore at a short distance from where the ship [Hibernia] was struck, and immediately went to pieces. It is feared every soul on board was lost."	
Unknown vessel		14 December 1767	A ship drove ashore in Duxbury during a snow storm. "December 24. On Monday the 14th we had here an easterly snow storm, but the wind not severe until late in the evening, when it came about to the westward, and blew exceeding hard all the night, and very cold. No damage that we hear of near this place, excepting two vessels drove ashore, viz, Captain Cobb from Quebec for this post [Boston]; and one outward bound for Philadelphia, on George's Island, both likely to be got off."	

== Suffolk County ==
Ship	Flag	Sunk date	Notes	Coordinates
Baleen		1 November 1975	A tug that foundered in Boston Harbor, northeast of The Graves Light, while in tow after a fire on board.	42°23′05″N 70°44′02″W
City of Salisbury		22 April 1938	A cargo ship that struck a ledge in fog and broke up in Boston Harbor.	42°22′26″N 70°51′35″W
Coyote		1932	A steamboat that was scuttled outside Boston Harbor.	42°22′06″N 70°43′06″W
Davis Palmer		26 December 1909	A schooner that struck Graves Ledge in Boston Harbor.	42°22′19″N 70°55′29″W
King Philip		7 April 1935	A steamboat that sank at dock, and was raised and scuttled in Boston Harbor.	
Kiowa		26 December 1903	A cargo ship that was rammed by the steamer Admiral Dewy in a snowstorm, while anchored southeast of Boston Light.	42°19′19″N 70°51′52″W
Mary E. O'Hara		21 January 1941	A fishing vessel that collided with the barge Winifred Sheridan in Boston Harbor.	42°23′00″N 70°55′00″W
Maritana	United States	3 November 1861	991-ton Maritana of Providence, Rhode Island, was a commercial vessel, which accidentally rammed Shag Rocks, Boston Harbor, in bad weather, and was torn apart by the waves.	
