= National Register of Historic Places listings in Gloucester, Massachusetts =

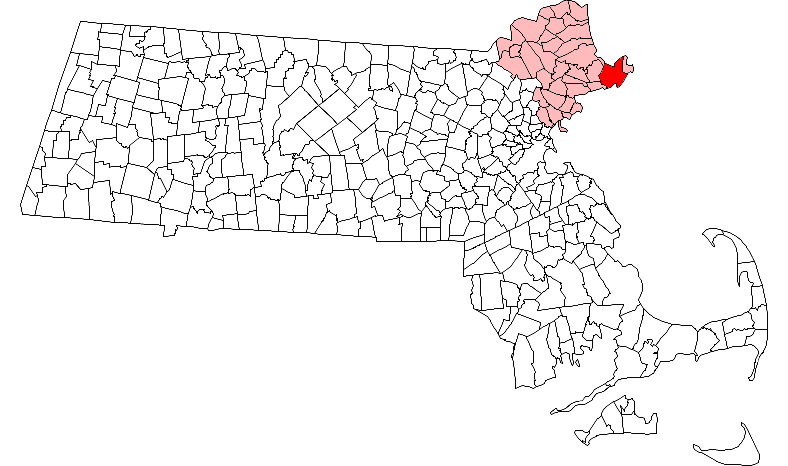
Location of Gloucester in Massachusetts

This is a list of the National Register of Historic Places listings in Gloucester, Massachusetts.

This is intended to be a complete list of the properties and districts on the National Register of Historic Places in Gloucester, Massachusetts, United States. The locations of National Register properties and districts for which the latitude and longitude coordinates are included below, may be seen in an online map.

Essex County, of which Gloucester is a part, is the location of more than 450 properties and districts listed on the National Register. Gloucester itself is the location of 35 of these properties and districts.

This National Park Service list is complete through NPS recent listings posted May 22, 2026.

== Current listings ==
	Name on the Register	Image	Date listed	Location	Neighborhood	Description
1	ADVENTURE (schooner)	ADVENTURE (schooner)	December 11, 1989 (#89002054)	State Fish Pier, Gloucester Inner Harbor; 42°36′53″N 70°39′06″W		
2	Annisquam Bridge	Annisquam Bridge	June 23, 1983 (#83000572)	Carries foot traffic over Lobster Cove between Washington St. and River Rd. 42°39′18″N 70°40′32″W		
3	Annisquam Harbor Light Station	Annisquam Harbor Light Station	June 15, 1987 (#87001526)	Wigwam Pt. 42°39′49″N 70°40′31″W		
4	Babson-Alling House	Babson-Alling House	April 26, 1996 (#96000472)	245 Washington St. 42°37′23″N 70°40′33″W		The house was listed on the National Register of Historic Places in 1996.
5	Beauport	Beauport	April 26, 1976 (#76000246)	75 Eastern Point Boulevard; 42°35′28″N 70°39′38″W		Designated a National Historic Landmark on May 27, 2003.
6	Central Gloucester Historic District	Central Gloucester Historic District	July 8, 1982 (#82001881)	Roughly bounded by Middle, Main, Center, Hancock, Short, Prospect, and Pleasant Sts. 42°36′46″N 70°39′55″W		
7	Davis-Freeman House	Davis-Freeman House	March 9, 1990 (#90000214)	302 Essex St. 42°36′38″N 70°42′32″W		
8	Dyke-Wheeler House	Dyke-Wheeler House	March 9, 1990 (#90000215)	144 Wheeler St. 42°38′36″N 70°40′51″W		
9	East Gloucester Square Historic District	East Gloucester Square Historic District	April 26, 1996 (#96000471)	E. Main St., roughly bounded by Inner Harbor, Smith Cove, Woonson Cove, and Mt. Pleasant Ave. 42°36′28″N 70°39′07″W		
10	Eastern Point Light Station	Eastern Point Light Station	September 30, 1987 (#87002027)	Eastern Pt. 42°34′38″N 70°39′52″W		
11	First Parish Burial Ground	First Parish Burial Ground	February 26, 2010 (#10000040)	122-R Centennial Ave. 42°37′03″N 70°40′23″W		
12	FRANK A. PALMER AND LOUIS B. CRARY (Shipwreck)	FRANK A. PALMER AND LOUIS B. CRARY (Shipwreck)	March 8, 2006 (#06000107)	Stellwagen Bank National Marine Sanctuary		
13	Front Street Block	Front Street Block	May 8, 1974 (#74000369)	West End, 55-71 Main St. 42°36′45″N 70°39′55″W		
14	Gloucester City Hall	Gloucester City Hall	May 8, 1973 (#73000297)	Dale Ave. 42°36′50″N 70°39′47″W		
15	Gloucester Fisherman's Memorial	Gloucester Fisherman's Memorial	May 7, 1996 (#96000473)	S. Stacy Boulevard near the entrance to Stacy Esplanade; 42°36′36″N 70°40′17″W		
16	Gloucester Net and Twine Company	Gloucester Net and Twine Company	April 26, 1996 (#96000474)	Maplewood Ave. at the southeastern junction of Maplewood Ave. and Grove St. 42°37′15″N 70°40′07″W		
17	Hammond Castle	Hammond Castle	May 8, 1973 (#73000298)	80 Hesperus Ave. 42°35′06″N 70°41′35″W		
18	Edward Harraden House	Edward Harraden House	March 9, 1990 (#90000212)	12-14 Leonard St. 42°39′13″N 70°40′47″W		
19	William Haskell House	William Haskell House	March 9, 1990 (#90000217)	11 Lincoln St. 42°37′38″N 70°44′18″W		
20	Ella Proctor Herrick House	Ella Proctor Herrick House	March 9, 1990 (#90000213)	257 Concord St. 42°38′33″N 70°43′26″W		Listed at 189 Concord Street.
21	JOFFRE (shipwreck)	JOFFRE (shipwreck)	January 16, 2009 (#08000887)	Stellwagen Bank National Marine Sanctuary		
22	LAMARTINE (shipwreck)	LAMARTINE (shipwreck)	March 7, 2012 (#12000067)	Stellwagen Bank National Marine Sanctuary		Granite Vessel Shipwrecks in the Stellwagen Bank National Marine Sanctuary Multiple Property Submission
23	Fitz Henry Lane House	Fitz Henry Lane House	July 1, 1970 (#70000837)	Harbor side of Rogers St. 42°36′41″N 70°39′36″W		
24	Norwood-Hyatt House	Norwood-Hyatt House	October 26, 2000 (#00001272)	704 Washington St. 42°39′04″N 70°40′26″W		
25	Oak Grove Cemetery	Oak Grove Cemetery	April 3, 1975 (#75000263)	Bounded by Derby, Washington, and Grove Sts., and Maplewood Ave. 42°37′10″N 70°40′14″W		
26	Our Lady of Good Voyage Church	Our Lady of Good Voyage Church	May 10, 1990 (#90000706)	136-144 Prospect St. and 2-4 Taylor St. 42°37′01″N 70°39′28″W		
27	PORTLAND (Shipwreck and Remains)	PORTLAND (Shipwreck and Remains)	January 13, 2005 (#04001473)	Stellwagen Bank National Marine Sanctuary		
28	Puritan House	Puritan House	May 28, 1976 (#76000244)	3 Washington St. and 2 Main St. 42°36′41″N 70°40′00″W		
29	Rocky Neck Historic District	Rocky Neck Historic District	August 24, 2017 (#100001502)	1-5 Eastern Point Rd., 285 E. Main St., Bickford Way, Clarendon, Fremont, Horton, Rackliffe Wiley & Wonson Sts. 42°36′17″N 70°39′25″W		
30	Sargent-Robinson House	Sargent-Robinson House	December 20, 2016 (#16000870)	972 & 974 Washington St. 42°40′16″N 70°39′54″W		
31	George O. Stacy House	George O. Stacy House	July 8, 1982 (#82004963)	107 Atlantic Rd. 42°36′30″N 70°38′03″W		Now the Bass Rocks Inn.
32	Ten Pound Island Light	Ten Pound Island Light	August 4, 1988 (#88001179)	Gloucester Harbor; 42°36′07″N 70°39′56″W		
33	Webster-Lane House	Webster-Lane House	April 26, 1996 (#96000475)	304 Main St. 42°36′57″N 70°39′24″W		
34	White-Ellery House	White-Ellery House	March 9, 1990 (#90000216)	247 Washington St. 42°37′23″N 70°40′34″W		Listed on the register at 244 Washington Street.
35	Whittemore House	Whittemore House	March 9, 1990 (#90000218)	179 Washington St. 42°37′07″N 70°40′28″W		

== See also ==
- List of National Historic Landmarks in Massachusetts
- National Register of Historic Places listings in Massachusetts
- National Register of Historic Places listings in Essex County, Massachusetts
