= Ella Proctor Herrick House =

Historic house in Massachusetts, United States

- U.S. National Register of Historic Places
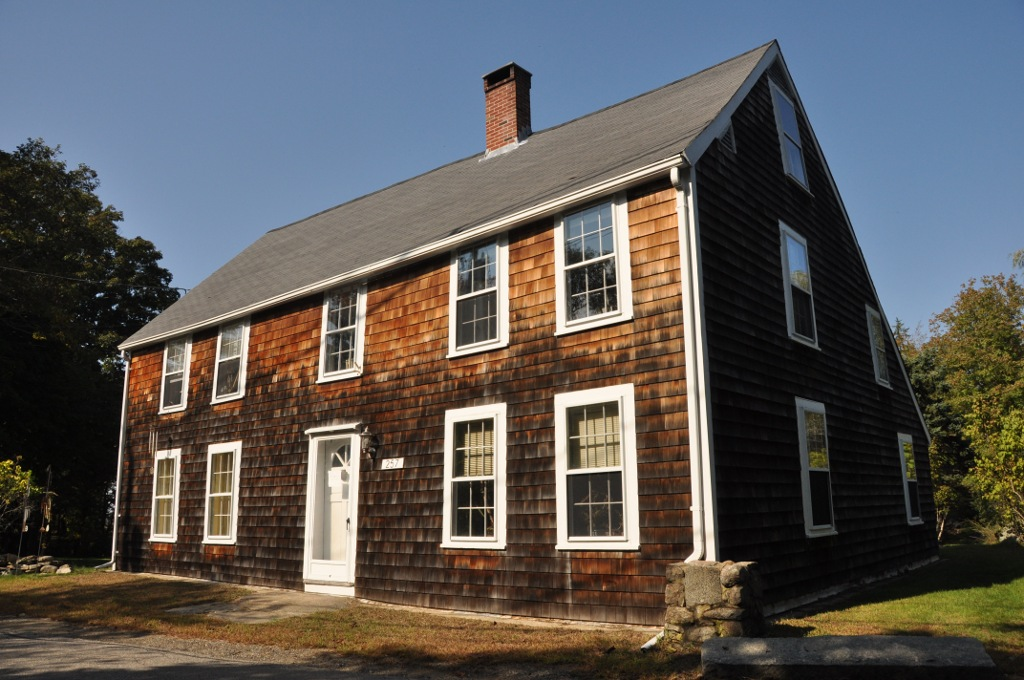

- Location within Massachusetts Location within the United States
- Location: 189 Concord Street, Gloucester, Massachusetts
- Coordinates: 42°38′33″N 70°43′26″W
- Architectural style: Colonial
- MPS: First Period Buildings of Eastern Massachusetts TR
- NRHP reference No.: 90000213
- Added to NRHP: March 9, 1990

The Ella Proctor Herrick House is a historic house in the rural western part of Gloucester, Massachusetts. The oldest portion of this First Period house was built in the late 17th century; a brick found in the central chimney bears the date 1672. The left side of the 2 1/2-story center-chimney saltbox shows clear evidence of 17th century construction methods, and includes a rare example of a segmentally arched interior door frame. The structure to the right of the chimney was added in the 18th century, and there were some early 20th-century additions. The central chimney is also a 20th-century replacement.

The house was added to the National Register of Historic Places in 1990.

== See also ==
- National Register of Historic Places listings in Gloucester, Massachusetts
- National Register of Historic Places listings in Essex County, Massachusetts
