= Lamartine (shipwreck) =

- U.S. National Register of Historic Places
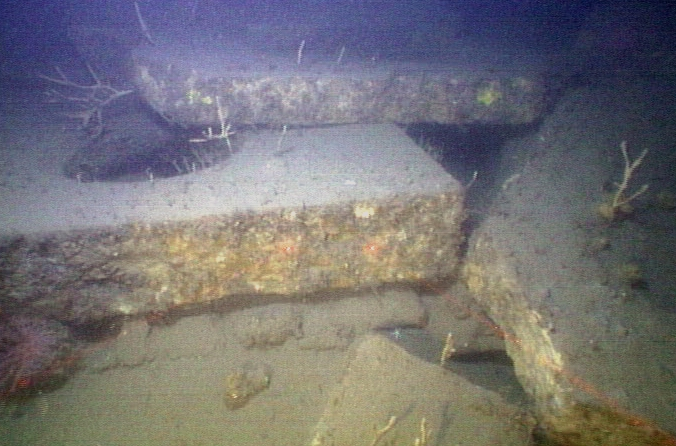
- Granite from the ship's cargo lies on the seafloor
- Nearest city: Gloucester, Massachusetts
- Built: 1848
- NRHP reference No.: 12000067

Significant dates
- Sank: 1893
- Added to NRHP: March 7, 2012

The Lamartine is a 19th-century shipwreck lying in the waters of the Stellwagen Bank National Marine Sanctuary, off Gloucester, Massachusetts. She was a schooner built in 1848 in Camden, Maine. She was hauling quarried granite from Stonington, Maine to New York City when she went down in a storm on May 17, 1893. One crewmember drowned; the others were rescued by a fishing vessel that saw the ship sinking. The wreck was located in 2004 by a survey team, documented over the next two years.

The wreck was listed on the National Register of Historic Places in 2012.

== See also ==
- National Register of Historic Places listings in Gloucester, Massachusetts
- National Register of Historic Places listings in Essex County, Massachusetts
