= Frank A. Palmer and Louise B. Crary (shipwreck) =

- U.S. National Register of Historic Places
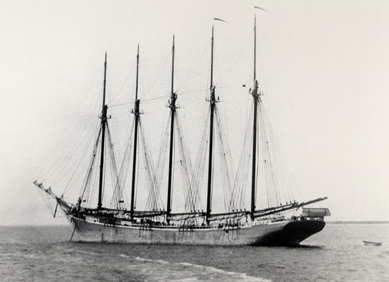
- Louise B. Crary
- Nearest city: Gloucester, Massachusetts
- Built: 1897
- Architect: Palmer, Nathaniel T.; New England Shipbuilding Company
- NRHP reference No.: 06000107
- Added to NRHP: March 8, 2006

Frank A. Palmer and Louise B. Crary are a historic dual shipwreck site in the Stellwagen Bank National Marine Sanctuary, off Gloucester, Massachusetts.

Nathaniel T. Palmer and the New England Shipbuilding Company built Frank A. Palmer in 1897. Louise B. Crary was launched in 1900. Both were wooden-hulled coal-carrying schooners. At 274 feet (84 meters) in length, Frank A. Palmer may be the largest four-masted schooner ever built. Louise B. Crary was 267 feet (81 meters) long and had five masts.

In 1899, Frank A. Palmer grounded near Tathem's life-saving station in New Jersey, but was refloated on July 23.

The ships were each carrying 3,000 tons of coal from Newport News, Virginia, to Boston, Massachusetts, when they collided on 17 December 1902 during a gale and sank together off Gloucester. Eleven of the 21 sailors aboard the two ships died. The wrecks were located in 2002 in the Stellwagen Bank National Marine Sanctuary. The shipwreck was added to the National Register of Historic Places in 2006.

== See also ==
- Portland Gale
- List of disasters in Massachusetts by death toll
- National Register of Historic Places listings in Gloucester, Massachusetts
- National Register of Historic Places listings in Essex County, Massachusetts
