= Edna G. shipwreck =

- Edna G shipwreck (Eastern Rig dragger)
- U.S. National Register of Historic Places
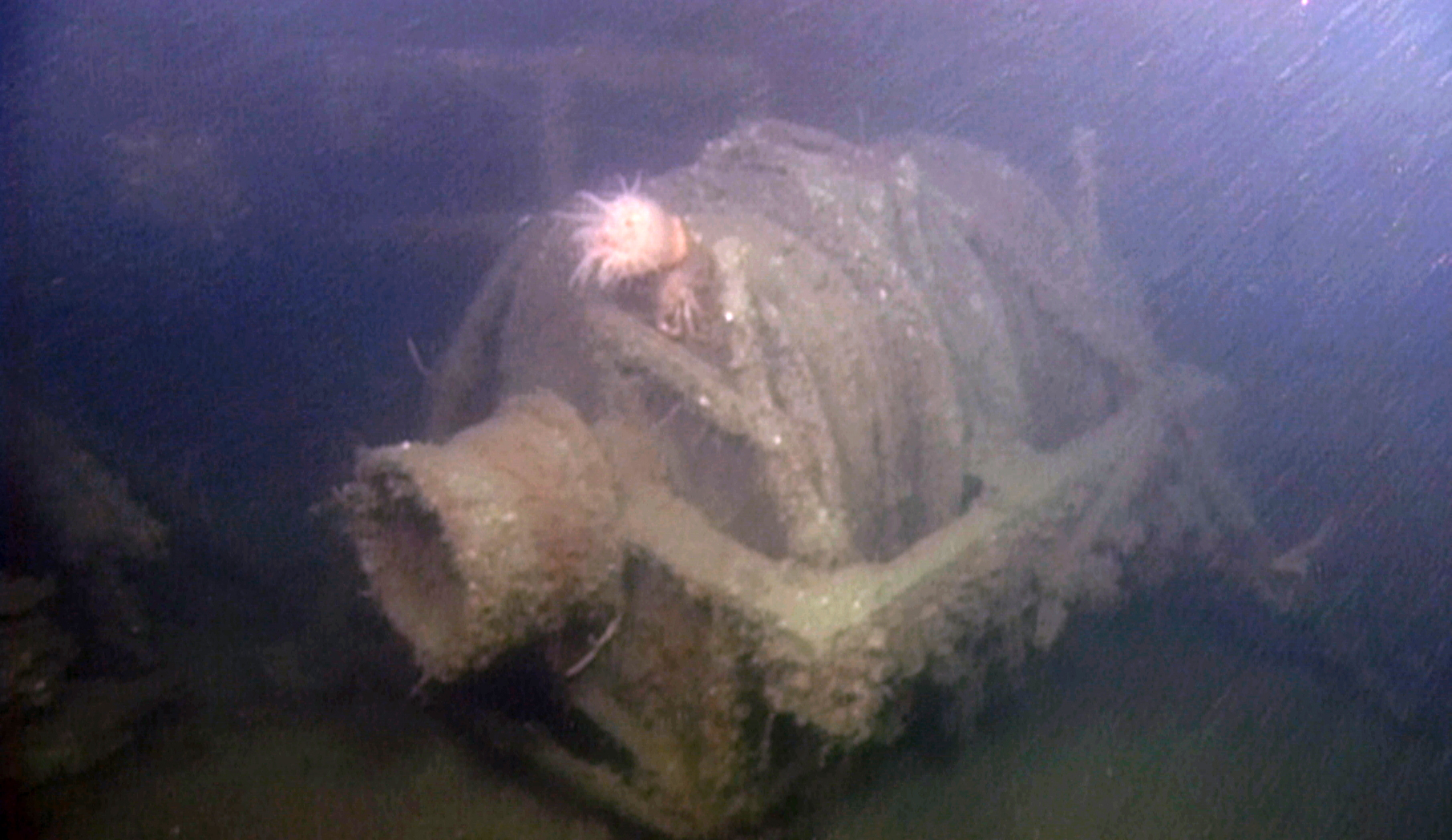
- The Edna G's winch
- Location: Stellwagen Bank National Marine Sanctuary
- NRHP reference No.: 10000039
- Added to NRHP: January 31, 2011

The Edna G is a shipwrecked eastern rig dragger (a type of fishing vessel) located on the seafloor of the Atlantic Ocean in the Stellwagen Bank National Marine Sanctuary. Laid down at Morehead City, North Carolina in 1956, she was a wooden-hulled, engine-powered vessel. She fished off the North Carolina coast until 1972, and then out of Portland, Maine until 1977, when she was moved to Gloucester, Massachusetts. She sank due to unknown causes in June 1988. The wreck was located in 2003. Due to its relatively pristine condition, the wreck has been listed on the United States National Register of Historic Places as an exemplar of mid-20th century fishing technology.

== See also ==
- National Register of Historic Places listings in southern Boston, Massachusetts
