= Sargent-Robinson House =

Historic house in Massachusetts, United States

- U.S. National Register of Historic Places
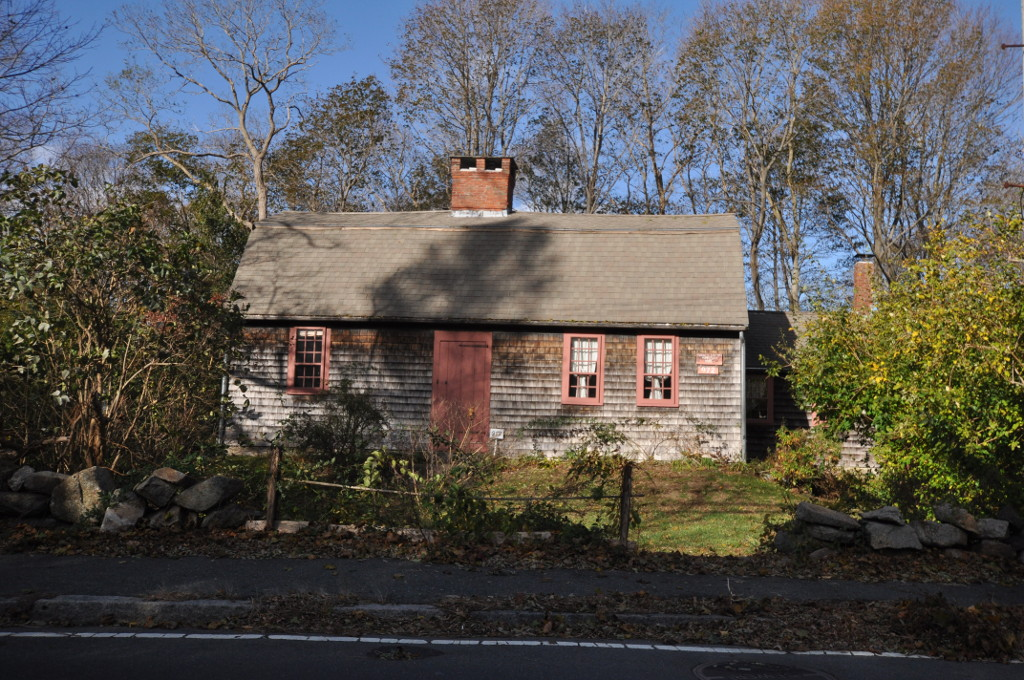

- Location within Massachusetts Location within the United States
- Location: 972–974 Washington St., Gloucester, Massachusetts
- Coordinates: 42°40′16″N 70°39′54″W
- Built: 1760
- Architectural style: Colonial
- NRHP reference No.: 16000870
- Added to NRHP: December 20, 2016

The Sargent-Robinson House is a historic house in Gloucester, Massachusetts. Built about 1760, it is a well-preserved example of an iconic local form, the gambrel-roofed cottage. It also includes probable foundational remnants of the c. 1700 house built on the site, and was owned into the 20th century by descendants of Samuel Sargent, who settled the land in 1695. It was listed on the National Register of Historic Places in 2016.

== Description and history ==
The Sargent-Robinson House is located in a rural-residential area of northern Gloucester, on the west side of Washington Street (Massachusetts Route 127) at its junction with Bay View Lane, a private lane of some antiquity. The house is a 1 1/2-story timber-frame construction, with a gambrel roof, large off-center chimney, and shingled exterior. The front facade has the entrance placed in front of the chimney, with two windows to one side and one to the other. The interior has a narrow entry vestibule with window staircase to the attic, with a parlor to the left, and what was originally the kitchen to the right. Ells dating to the early 19th century, also retaining features of that period, extend the house to the north and east. The interior was subjected to a historically sensitive restoration in the 1960s and 1970s.

The house was built about 1760 by Jonathan Sargent, the grandson of Samuel Sargent, who first settled this land in 1695. The younger Sargent's lands included 17 acres (6.9 ha) of property between the "highway" (now essentially Washington Street) and the coast. In the early 19th century the house was enlarged and divided for use by two families, typically both members of the extended Sargent clan. In 1836 it was acquired by Daniel Robinson, who had married Charlotte Sargent. Robinsons, later married into the Lane family, owned the property until 1969. It was then subjected to a careful restoration.

== See also ==
- National Register of Historic Places listings in Gloucester, Massachusetts
- National Register of Historic Places listings in Essex County, Massachusetts
