= Puritan House =

Historic house in Massachusetts, United States

- U.S. National Register of Historic Places
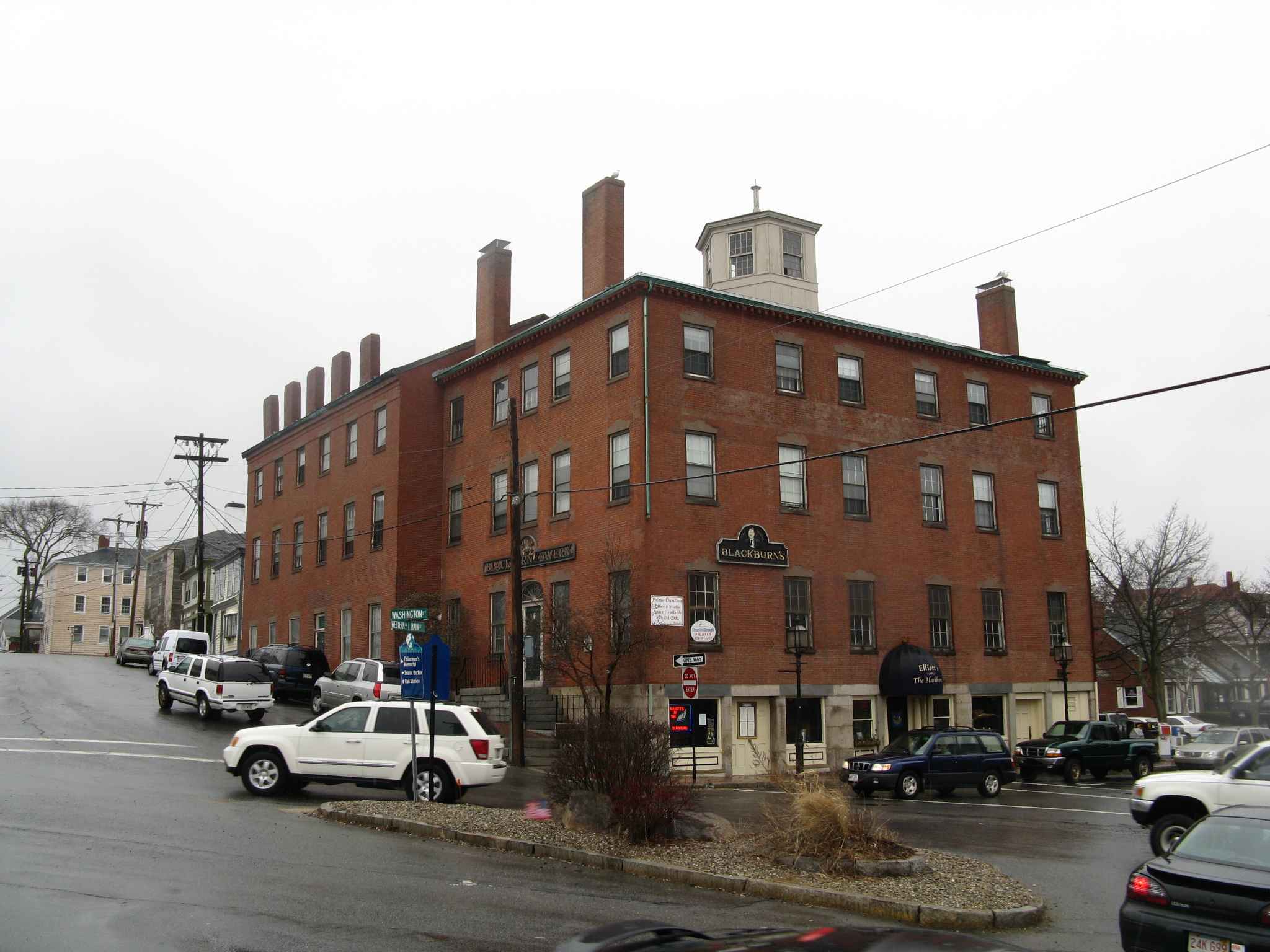
- 2 Main Street

- Location within Massachusetts Location within the United States
- Location: Gloucester, Massachusetts
- Coordinates: 42°36′41.6″N 70°39′58.5″W
- Built: 1810
- Architect: Colonel James Tappan
- NRHP reference No.: 76000244
- Added to NRHP: May 28, 1976

The Puritan House is a historic hotel building at 3 Washington Street and 2 Main Street in Gloucester, Massachusetts. It was the first brick building to be built in the city. It was built in 1810 for James Tappan, a schoolteacher from New Hampshire who once had Daniel Webster as a student. Tappan operated Tappan's Hotel on the premises, and it served as a major social center for the community. Later owners also operated it as a hotel space, including one who gave it the name "Puritan House". It now houses other businesses.

The building was listed on the National Register of Historic Places in 1976, and was included in the Central Gloucester Historic District in 1982.

== See also ==
- National Register of Historic Places listings in Gloucester, Massachusetts
- National Register of Historic Places listings in Essex County, Massachusetts
