= George O. Stacy House =

Historic house in Massachusetts, United States

- U.S. National Register of Historic Places
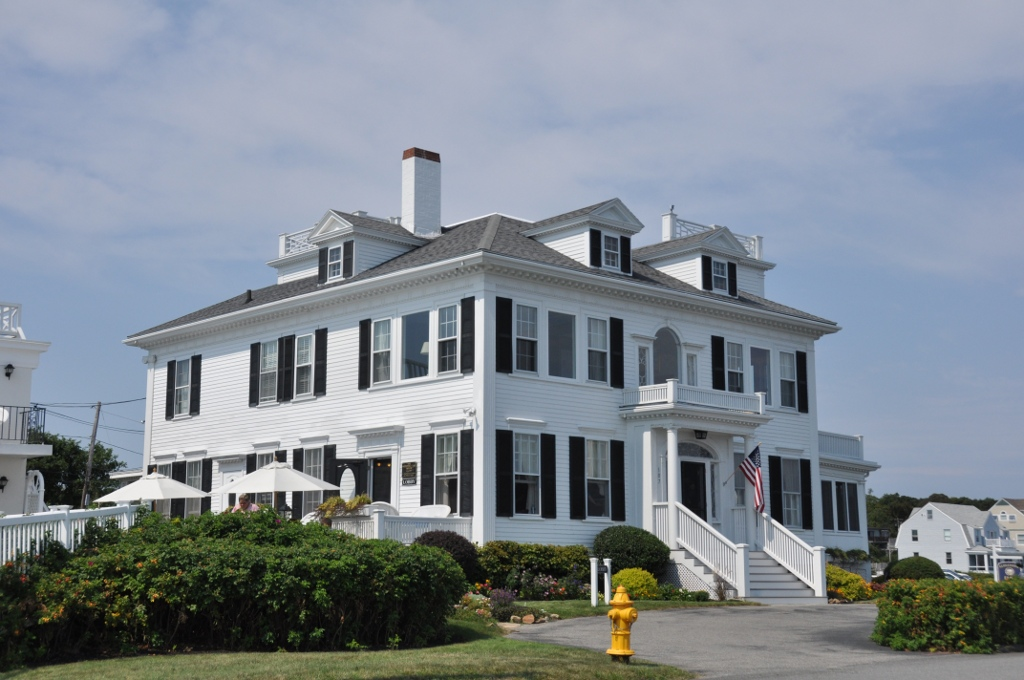

- Location within Massachusetts Location within the United States
- Location: Gloucester, Massachusetts
- Coordinates: 42°36′30″N 70°38′3″W
- Built: 1899
- Architect: Phillips & Holloran
- Architectural style: Colonial Revival
- NRHP reference No.: 82004963
- Added to NRHP: July 8, 1982

The George O. Stacy House is a historic house at 107 Atlantic Road in Gloucester, Massachusetts, United States. The elaborate Colonial Revival house now serves as part of the Bass Rocks Inn. It was built in 1899 for George O. Stacy, a leading Gloucester real estate developer and hotel operator, and designed by Phillips & Halloran. Although it was apparently built for Stacy and his wife to live in, they never did so because his wife objected to its remote location and seasonal isolation. Stacy ended up using it as a rental property.

The house was listed on the National Register of Historic Places in 1982.

== See also ==
- National Register of Historic Places listings in Gloucester, Massachusetts
- National Register of Historic Places listings in Essex County, Massachusetts
