= East Gloucester Square Historic District =

Historic district in Massachusetts, United States

- U.S. National Register of Historic Places
- U.S. Historic district
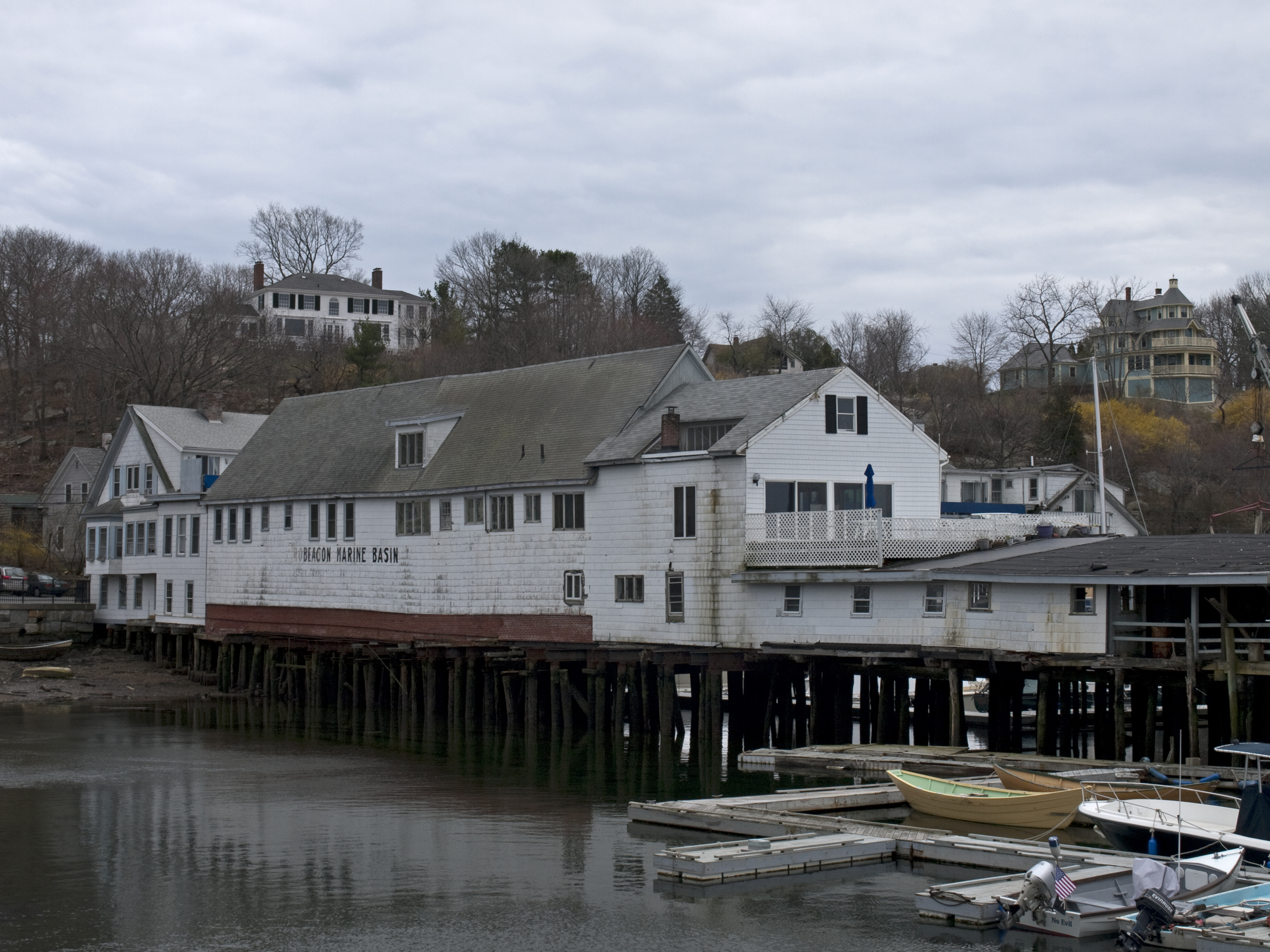
- Eastern Wharf

- Location within Massachusetts Location within the United States
- Location: Gloucester, Massachusetts
- Coordinates: 42°36′28″N 70°39′7″W
- Area: 75 acres (30 ha)
- Built: 1700
- Architectural style: Bungalow/Craftsman, Greek Revival, Georgian
- MPS: Gloucester MPS
- NRHP reference No.: 96000471
- Added to NRHP: April 26, 1996

East Gloucester Square Historic District is a historic district encapsulating the evolutionary history of the active maritime community of Gloucester, Massachusetts, United States, over a period of more than 200 years. East Gloucester is located on the south side of Gloucester's Inner Harbor, opposite the city's main downtown area. The district is essentially linear in character extending along East Main Street between Rocky Neck Avenue and Montgomery Place, with a southward extension along Highland, Chapel, and Plum Streets to Mount Pleasant Avenue. East Main Street was formally laid out in 1704 to East Gloucester Square (its junction with Highland Street), and provides access to numerous waterfront facilities, including stone wharves and 19th century ship building and repair facilities. Housing is set on the roads leading up the hill from East Gloucester Square, and is generally densely set Greek Revival or Italianate in style, reflecting the dominant period of the area's development, the mid-to-late 19th century. Higher style residences were placed on larger lots on Mount Pleasant Avenue.

The district was listed on the National Register of Historic Places in 1996.

== See also ==
- National Register of Historic Places listings in Gloucester, Massachusetts
- National Register of Historic Places listings in Essex County, Massachusetts
