= William Haskell House =

Historic house in Massachusetts, United States

- U.S. National Register of Historic Places
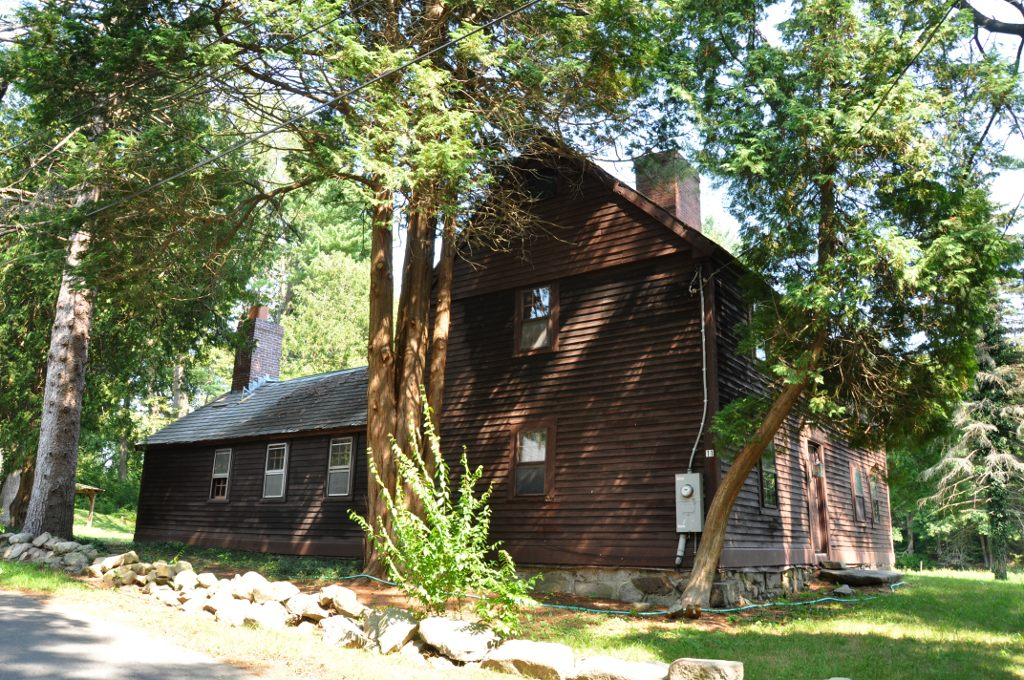

- Location within Massachusetts Location within the United States
- Location: 11 Lincoln Street, Gloucester, Massachusetts
- Coordinates: 42°37′38″N 70°44′18″W
- Architectural style: Colonial
- MPS: First Period Buildings of Eastern Massachusetts TR
- NRHP reference No.: 90000217
- Added to NRHP: March 9, 1990

The William Haskell House is a historic colonial house in Gloucester, Massachusetts.

This 2 1/2-story First Period house was built in 1680. It is four bays wide, and includes additions made in the 18th century. In the early 20th century this house was purchased by sculptor A. H. Atkins, who made a number of alterations, but also took steps to preserve the house. Publicity over this work in the 1920s and 1930s contributed to growing interest in the preservation of First Period structures. The house was briefly owned by the Cape Ann Museum as a house museum.

The house was listed on the National Register of Historic Places in 1990.

== See also ==
- National Register of Historic Places listings in Gloucester, Massachusetts
- National Register of Historic Places listings in Essex County, Massachusetts
