= Webster-Lane House =

Historic house in Massachusetts, United States

- U.S. National Register of Historic Places
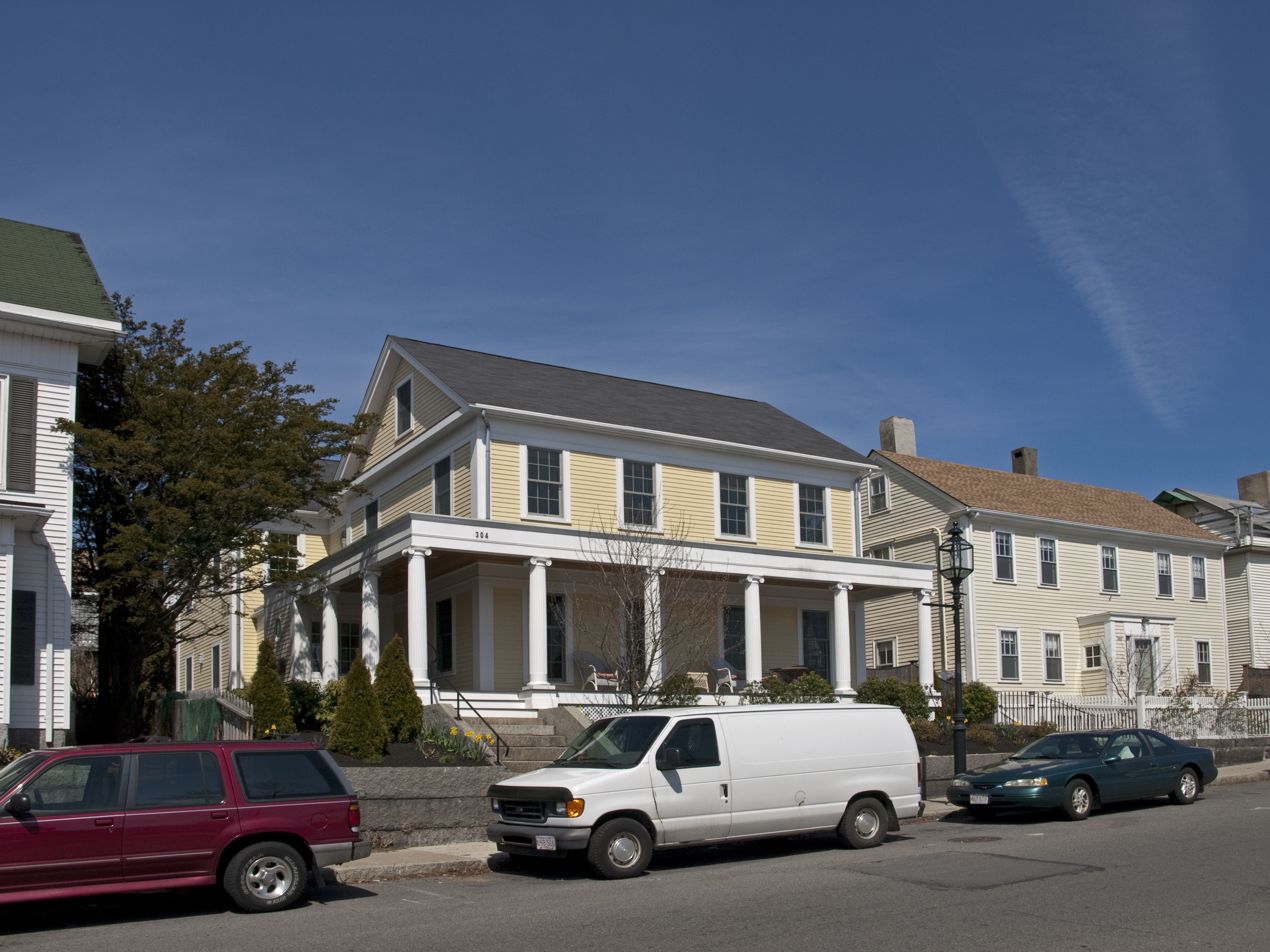

- Location within Massachusetts Location within the United States
- Location: 304 Main Street, Gloucester, Massachusetts
- Coordinates: 42°36′56.43″N 70°39′24.3″W
- Built: 1840
- Architectural style: Greek Revival
- MPS: Gloucester MPS
- NRHP reference No.: 96000475
- Added to NRHP: April 26, 1996

The Webster-Lane House is a historic house in Gloucester, Massachusetts. The two-story wood-frame Greek Revival house was built sometime before 1845, when it first appears on city maps. It was occupied by Nathaniel Webster, a hotel proprietor and ice dealer, between at least 1851 and 1860. It was also occupied, from at least 1869 until 1900, buy Samuel R. Lane, a major merchant and shipper of fish products. Some of the house's Greek Revival features, most notably its columned porch, are unique in the city.

The house was listed on the National Register of Historic Places in 1996.

== See also ==
- National Register of Historic Places listings in Gloucester, Massachusetts
- National Register of Historic Places listings in Essex County, Massachusetts
