= Joffre (shipwreck) =

- U.S. National Register of Historic Places
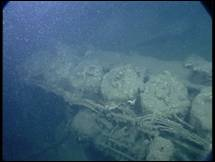
- Part of the wreck
- Nearest city: Gloucester, Massachusetts
- Built: 1918
- NRHP reference No.: 08000887

Significant dates
- Sank: 1947
- Added to NRHP: January 16, 2009

The Joffre is a 20th-century shipwreck lying in the waters of the Stellwagen Bank National Marine Sanctuary, off Gloucester, Massachusetts. She was a schooner built in 1912 in Essex, Massachusetts. Active in the Gloucester fishery, she first used tub trawls for fishing, and was converted to an eastern rig dragger (a type of trawler) and motorized in 1939. She was returning to Gloucester when her engine caught fire on the evening of August 9, 1947. The wheelhouse was engulfed, the crew abandoned ship, and she sank the next day. The wreck was documented by a Stellwagen Bank survey team in 2006.

The wreck was listed on the National Register of Historic Places in 2009.

== See also ==
- National Register of Historic Places listings in Gloucester, Massachusetts
- National Register of Historic Places listings in Essex County, Massachusetts
