= Dyke-Wheeler House =

Historic house in Massachusetts, United States

- U.S. National Register of Historic Places
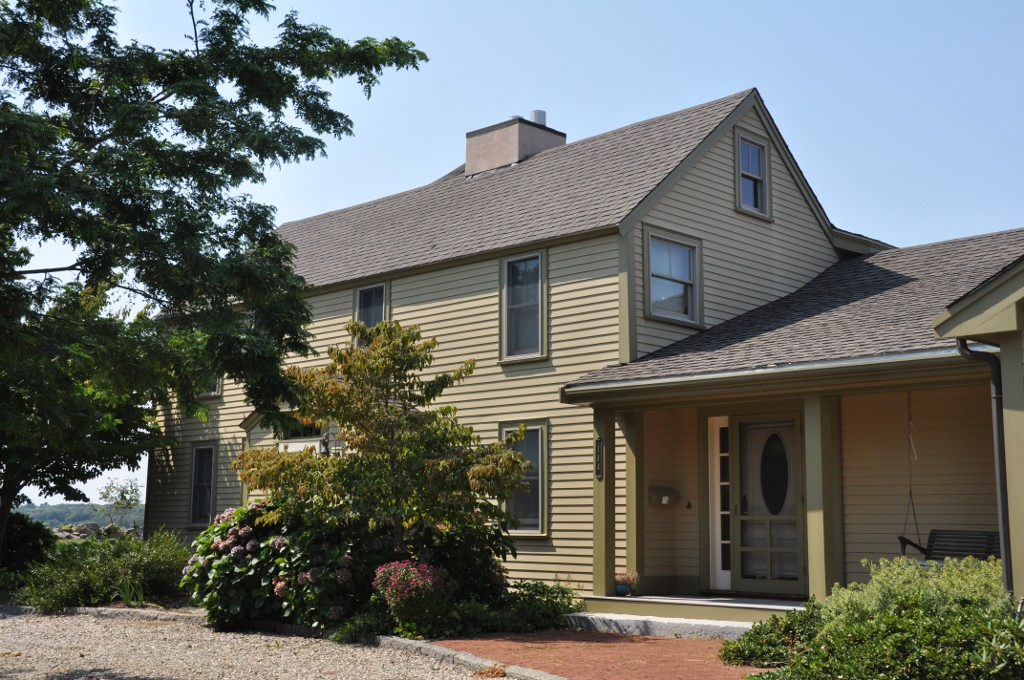

- Location within Massachusetts Location within the United States
- Location: 144 Wheeler Street, Gloucester, Massachusetts
- Coordinates: 42°38′36″N 70°40′51″W
- Built: 1720
- Architectural style: Colonial
- MPS: First Period Buildings of Eastern Massachusetts TR
- NRHP reference No.: 90000215
- Added to NRHP: March 9, 1990

The Dyke-Wheeler House is a historic colonial house in Gloucester, Massachusetts. The 2 1/2-story plank-framed First Period house was built in about 1720, and has a typical center chimney plan. The leanto section was added c. 1800. The house was at one time believed to have been built earlier, in the 1660s, by a man named Richard Dyke. The house was later owned by the Wheeler family for whom Wheeler's Point, where the house is located, is named. It is one of two First Period houses surviving on Wheeler's Point.

The house was listed on the National Register of Historic Places in 1990.

== See also ==
- National Register of Historic Places listings in Gloucester, Massachusetts
- National Register of Historic Places listings in Essex County, Massachusetts
