= Gloucester Fishermen's Wives Association =

US non-profit organization

The Gloucester Fishermen's Wives Association
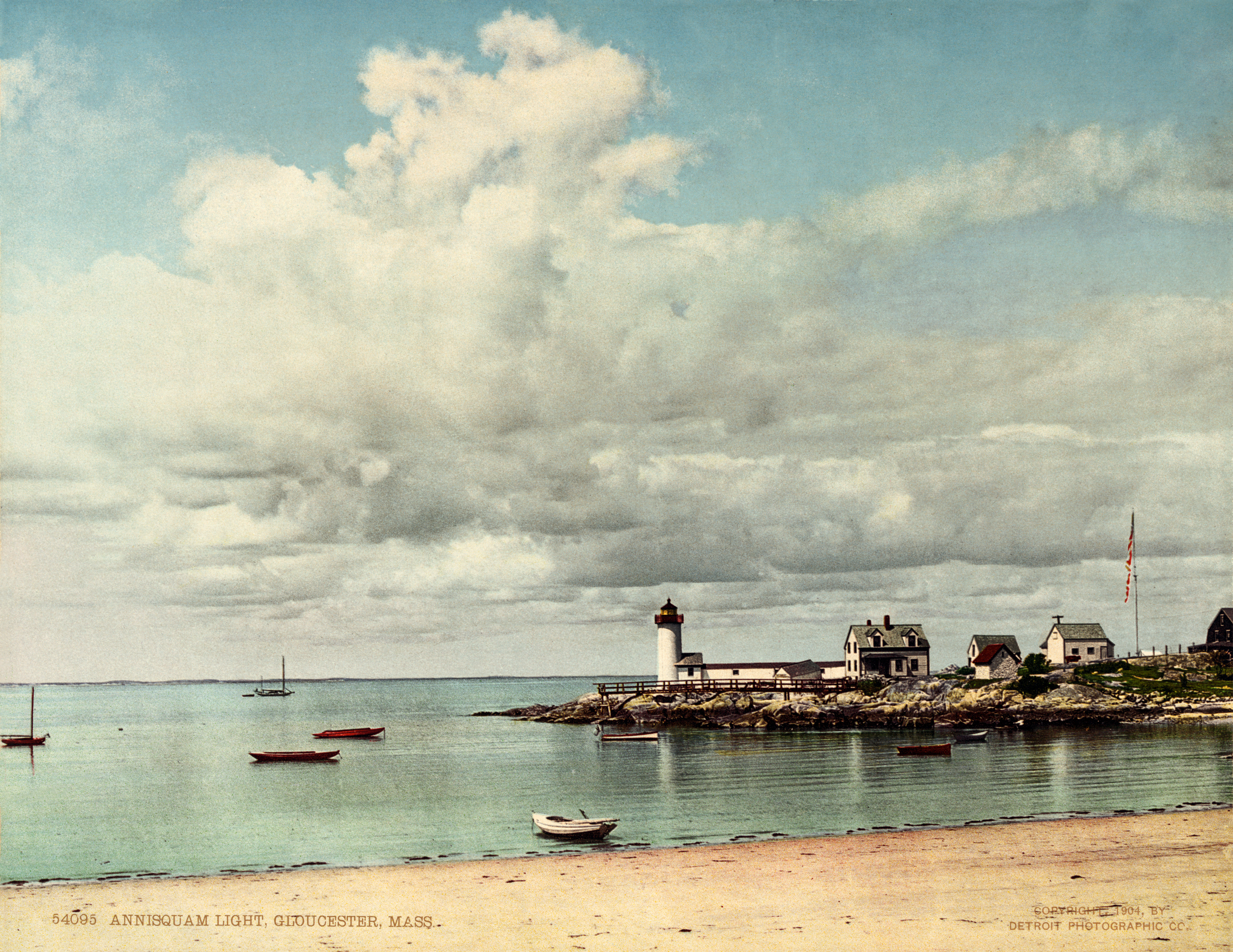
- Looking out to sea, Annisquam Light, 1904
- Founder: Lena Novello
- Type: Social Services Organization
- Location: 2 Blackburn Center, Gloucester MA 01930
- Region served: Gloucester, Massachusetts
- Key people: Current President: Angela Orlando Sanfilippo
- Formerly called: United Fishermen's Wives Organization of Gloucester or "The Wives"

Gloucester Fishermen's Wives Association (GFWA), also known as the Fishermen's Wives of Gloucester (Association), is a non-profit organization "promoting the New England fishing industry, helping to preserve the Atlantic Ocean as a food supply for the world, and assisting active and retired fishermen and their families to live better lives".

== History ==
The Gloucester Fishermen's Wives Association (GFWA) was formed in 1969 and was initially called the United Fishermen's Wives Organization of Gloucester, informally "the Wives", changing its name to GFWA in 1977. The GFWA started as a group of primarily Sicilian American women, many first-generation immigrants, and initially focused on concerns of local fishermen. However, in the late 1970s the GFWA became active at the state, federal, and international levels as well, lobbying for fisheries conservation and management legislation. GWFA also produced two successful cookbooks and held events throughout New England to promote fishing and protect fishing stock by teaching the public to use species of fish popular in Sicilian cooking, but underused in American. As the work of the GFWA expanded, the group created two sister organizations: Gloucester Fishermen's Wives Memorial, Incorporated (GFWM) in 1982, and Gloucester Fishermen's Wives Development Programs (GFWDP) in 1995. The GFWA continues to promote Gloucester, Massachusetts, the oldest fishing port in the nation, "for its beauty and the culture of the people on its working waterfront", and is an "international model for conserving and protecting fish stocks and a working waterfront for future generations."

== Recent work ==
In 2009 the group started a community supported fishery project - following the community-supported agriculture or CSA model—in which participants buy a share of the year's catch. The Cape Ann Fresh Catch has continued to support local events highlighting the importance of sustainable fisheries, such as the annual "Seafood Throwdown".

== Memorials ==
The group, with its sister group GWFM, raised funds for a statue by local Gloucester sculptor Morgan Faulds Pike marking its contributions to the Gloucester community, as well as the role of the fisherman's wife in maintaining households and economies in the community; the statue was dedicated in 2001.

== Publications ==
The GFWA has published three cookbooks:

- The Taste of Gloucester: a fisherman's wife cooks (1976)
- The Fishermen's Wives' cookbook: 185 seafood recipes (1979)
- Gloucester fishermen's wives' cookbook: stories and recipes (2005)
