= Edward Harraden House =

Historic house in Massachusetts, United States

- U.S. National Register of Historic Places
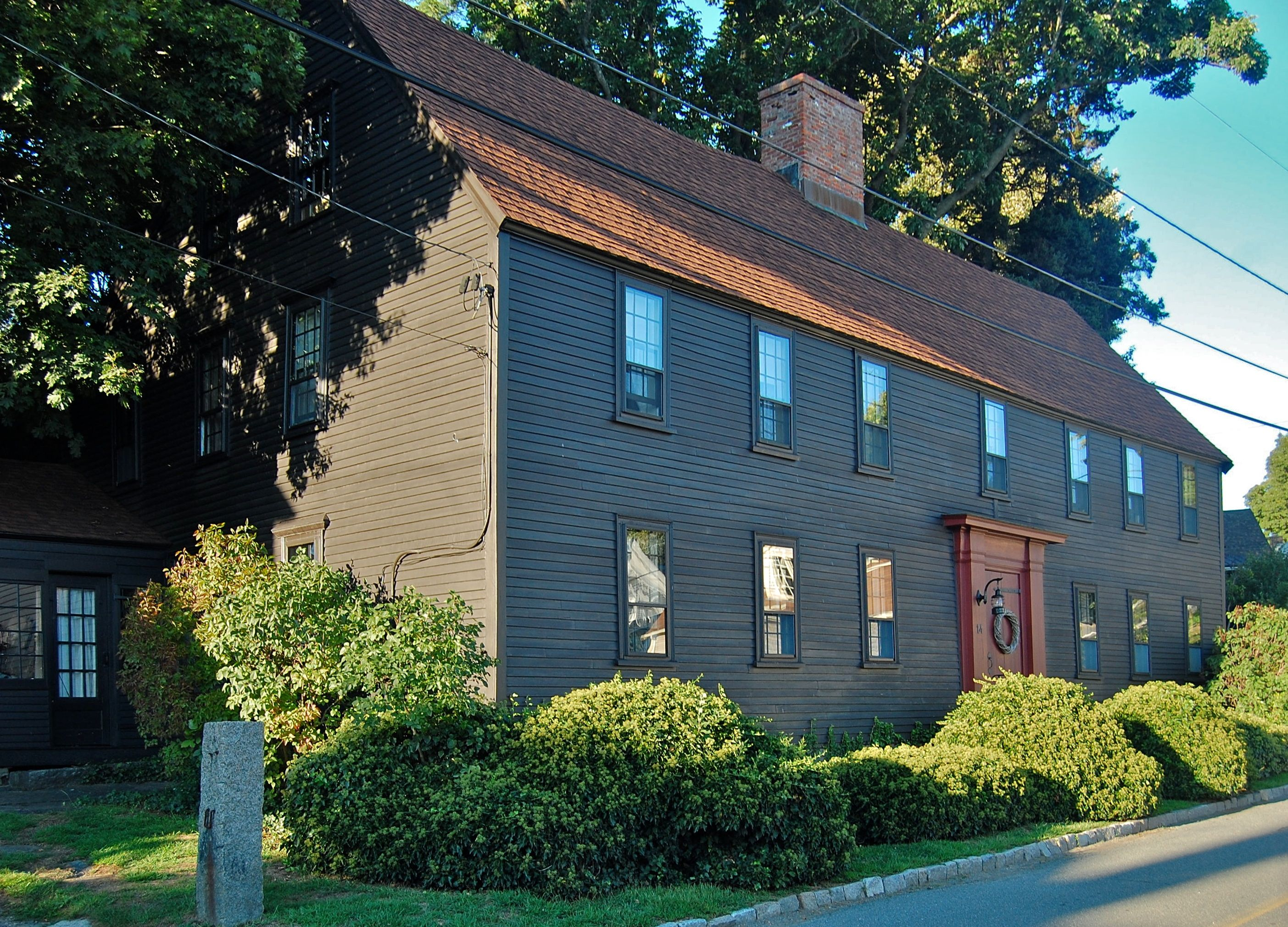
- Edward Harraden house at 14 Leonard Street

- Location within Massachusetts Location within the United States
- Location: 12–14 Leonard Street, Gloucester, Massachusetts
- Coordinates: 42°39′13″N 70°40′47″W
- Built: c. 1660
- Architectural style: Colonial
- MPS: First Period Buildings of Eastern Massachusetts TR
- NRHP reference No.: 90000212
- Added to NRHP: March 9, 1990

The Edward Harraden House is a historic house in Gloucester, Massachusetts. It was built on land purchased by Edward Harraden in 1656, who is presumed to have built the house not long afterward. It was one of the early houses in the development of Annisquam village. It is a 2 1/2-story seven-bay colonial with an off-center central chimney. The oldest portion of the house is the second through fourth bays from the left; the interior sections to the right of the chimney was added sometime before 1765. The house was afterward further extended by one bay on each side. The only clear evidence of its First Period origins is in the attic, or is covered over by the walls.

The house was built c. 1660 and added to the National Register of Historic Places in 1990.

== See also ==
- List of the oldest buildings in Massachusetts
- National Register of Historic Places listings in Gloucester, Massachusetts
- National Register of Historic Places listings in Essex County, Massachusetts
