= Gloucester Net and Twine Company =

- U.S. National Register of Historic Places
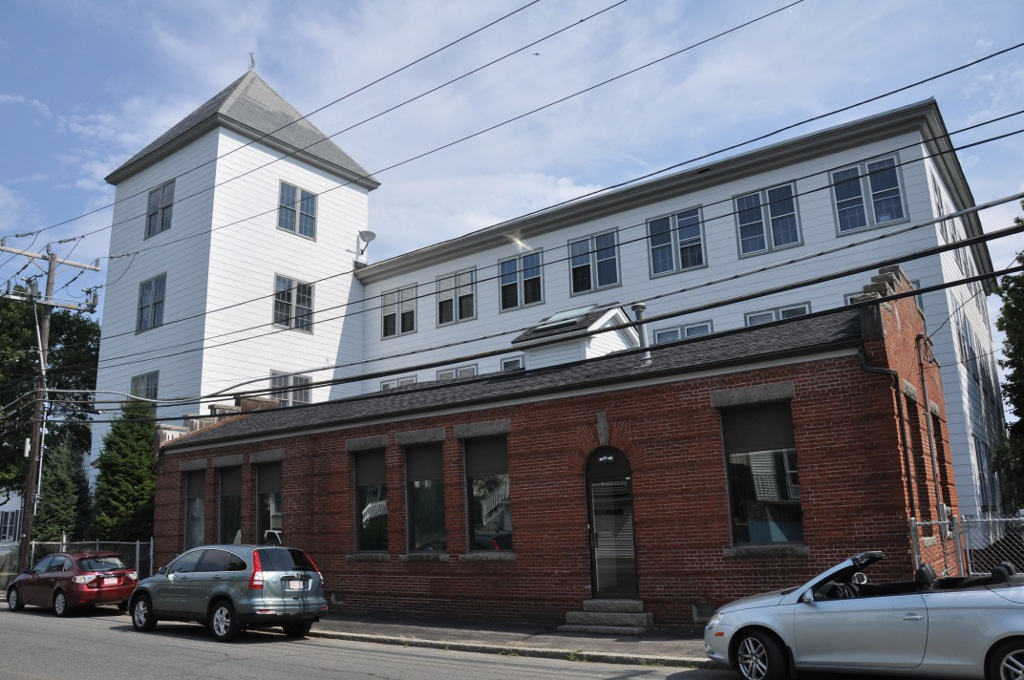

- Location within Massachusetts Location within the United States
- Location: Gloucester, Massachusetts
- Coordinates: 42°37′15″N 70°40′7″W
- Built: 1884
- Architectural style: Italianate
- MPS: Gloucester MPS
- NRHP reference No.: 96000474
- Added to NRHP: April 26, 1996

The Gloucester Net and Twine Company is a historic factory in Gloucester, Massachusetts. It was the factory of one of Gloucester's most important fishing-related manufacturing businesses, founded in 1884. The complex was built c. 1899. The main factory building is a utilitarian wood-frame structure three stories high, six window bays wide and fourteen long. Its long facade, along Maplewood Avenue, is centered on a four-story tower, to the right of which is a single-story brick power supply building with Italianate detailing.

The complex was listed on the National Register of Historic Places in 1996.

== See also ==
- National Register of Historic Places listings in Gloucester, Massachusetts
- National Register of Historic Places listings in Essex County, Massachusetts
