= Davis-Freeman House =

Historic house in Massachusetts, United States

- U.S. National Register of Historic Places
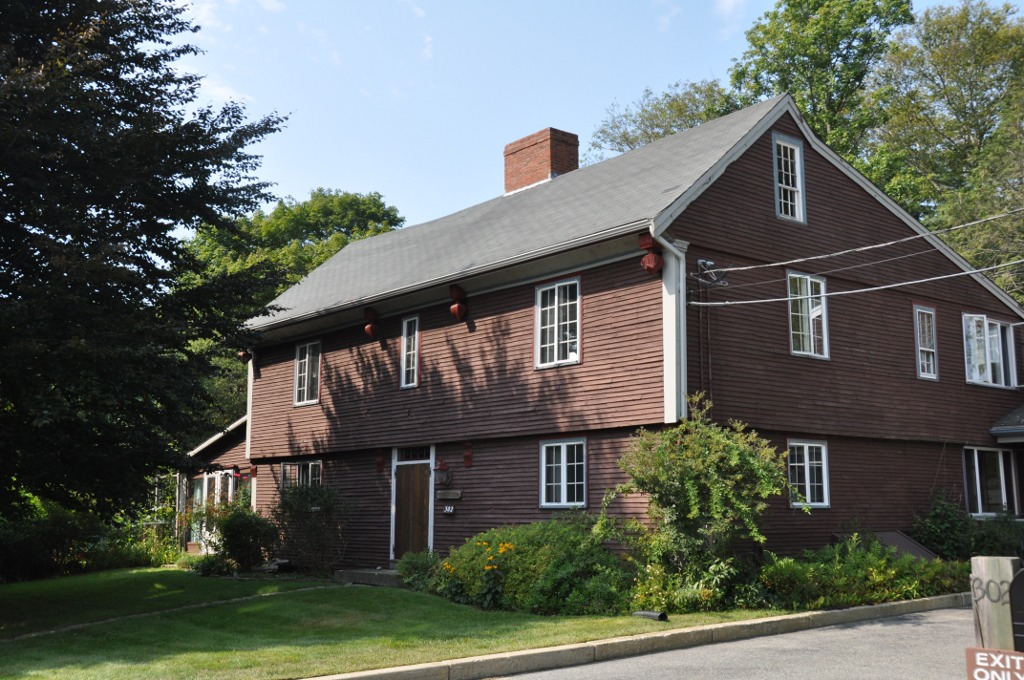

- Location within Massachusetts Location within the United States
- Location: 302 Essex Ave., Gloucester, Massachusetts
- Coordinates: 42°36′38″N 70°42′32″W
- Built: 1709
- Built by: Jacob Davis
- Architectural style: Colonial
- MPS: First Period Buildings of Eastern Massachusetts TR
- NRHP reference No.: 90000214
- Added to NRHP: March 9, 1990

The Davis-Freeman House is a historic house in Gloucester, Massachusetts, USA. Built in the early 17th century, it is a rare local example of a plank-framed house. It was listed on the National Register of Historic Places in 1990. It presently is the Executive offices and Education Center for Wellspring House, Inc.

== Description and history ==
The Davis-Freeman House stands on slightly more than 1.5 acres (0.61 ha) on the south side of Essex Avenue (Massachusetts Route 133) in a rural-suburban area of western Gloucester. It is set just north of the Little River, a tidal tributary of the Annisquam River. It is a 2 1/2-story plank construction, with a gabled roof and clapboarded exterior. Its second story projects beyond the first in front, where the exposed timbers are seen to be hand-hewn, and moulded post heads are visible. The windows and central chimney are the product of a c. 1930s restoration. It has had a few 20th century additions.

This property was first built upon by Jacob Davis who built was later referred to as Davis's "little house." The house was likely built sometime after 1685 by Jacob Davis, Jr. In 1709 Jacob Davis would add a 20' by 42' addition to his small house. For most of the 17th and 18th century, the house was used as private residence. Robert Freeman, the son of a former enslaved man, Robin Freeman, would purchase this property in 1826 and it would remain in his family until 1929. It was then purchased by Peter and Effie Keffer, who undertook the restoration of the property. It now serves as the offices of Wellspring House, Inc. and Education Center and is listed on the National Register of Historic Places.

== See also ==
- National Register of Historic Places listings in Gloucester, Massachusetts
- National Register of Historic Places listings in Essex County, Massachusetts
