= Adventure (1926 schooner) =

1926 schooner

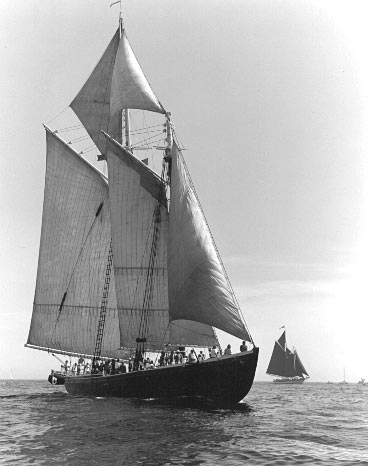
- Sailing in the tourist trade

History

United States
- Builder: J. F. James & Son Shipyard
- Launched: 16 September 1926

General characteristics
- Type: Schooner
- Tonnage: 130 gross register tons (GRT)
- Length: 122 ft (37 m) (LOA); 109 ft (33 m) (LWL)
- Beam: 24 ft 6 in (7.47 m)
- Height: 110 ft (34 m)
- Draft: 13 ft 6 in (4.11 m)
- Installed power: 120 hp (89 kW) diesel (1926–1954); Detroit Diesel 671 (2012–)
- Sail plan: Gaff rigged schooner
- Complement: 27
- Adventure (schooner)
- U.S. National Register of Historic Places
- U.S. National Historic Landmark
- Location within Massachusetts
- Location: Gloucester, Massachusetts
- Coordinates: 42°36′56.3″N 70°39′14.7″W
- Built: 1926
- Architect: Thomas F. McManus
- NRHP reference No.: 89002054

Significant dates
- Added to NRHP: 11 December 1989
- Designated NHL: 19 April 1994

Adventure is a gaff rigged knockabout schooner. She was built in Essex, Massachusetts, USA, and launched in 1926 to work the Grand Banks fishing grounds out of Gloucester. She is one of only two surviving knockabout fishing schooners – ships designed without bowsprits for the safety of their crew while underway.

Adventure was declared a National Historic Landmark in 1994, underwent a substantial restoration in 2012, and sails today in the tourist trade out of Gloucester.

== History ==
Adventure was designed by Thomas F. McManus of Boston and built at the John F. James & Son Yard in Essex, Massachusetts, for Captain Jeff Thomas of Gloucester. She was one of the last wooden sailing vessels of her kind built for the dory-fishing industry that once thrived on the Grand Banks.

Adventure is a spoonbow knockabout schooner, designed without a bowsprit as a safety measure, as the bowsprit was where a significant amount of deaths at sea occurred. The McManus knockabout design was regarded by maritime historian Howard I. Chapelle as "the acme in the long evolution of the New England fishing schooner." Launched on 16 September 1926, Adventure measured 122 feet (37 m) overall, sported a gaff rig and carried a 120 horsepower (89 kW) diesel engine, and a crew of twenty-seven. Named for one of the fantasy fleet of ships drawn by Captain Thomas's young son, she fished the once-bountiful Grand Banks of the North Atlantic from her home port of Gloucester from 1926 to 1953 under Captain Jeff Thomas, and later, Captain Leo Hynes. Adventure was the biggest money-maker of the time, landing nearly $4 million worth of cod and halibut in her fishing career. Her retirement marked the end of the American dory-fishing schooner in the North Atlantic.

In 1954, Adventure was sold to Donald Hurd, Dayton Newton, and Herbert Beizer and refitted for the windjammer tourist trade, carrying vacationing passengers up and down the Maine coast. The fish pens were converted into cabins and the engine removed to make room for sleeping quarters. Adventure's prowess in the Gulf of Maine earned her the nickname "Queen of the Windjammers."

In 1964 she was sold to Captain Jim Sharp of Camden, Maine, who continued her career in the tourist trade for nearly twenty-four years. In 1988, Captain Sharp donated Adventure to the people of Gloucester to be preserved as Gloucester's historic tall ship, to be used to educate the public about the role of fishing in American history.

In 1988, the non-profit group, Gloucester Adventure, Inc., was formed to preserve the schooner as a monument to the history of Gloucester. Through the efforts of the Gloucester Adventure, Inc., and volunteers, Adventure is now a destination site on the Essex National Heritage Area Maritime Trail, is listed in the National Register of Historic Places and is a designated National Historic Landmark. In 1999, Adventure was selected as an Official Project of Save America's Treasures by the National Trust for Historic Preservation.

== Restoration ==
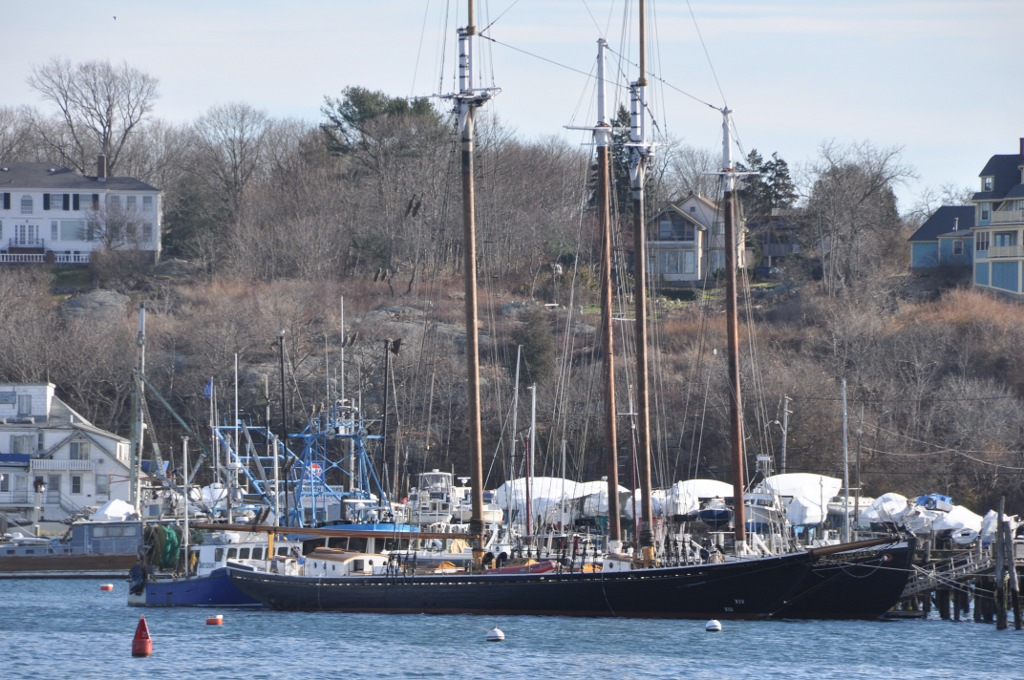
Undergoing Restoration in 2012

Restoration work on Adventure was commenced in 2012 at Maritime Gloucester on Harbor Loop. In September 2012 she was fitted with a Detroit Diesel 671 engine and moved under her own mechanical power for the first time since 1954. In August 2013 she left Gloucester Harbor under full sail, and received her Passenger Vessel certificate from the United States Coast Guard in June 2015.

== See also ==
- List of schooners
- National Register of Historic Places listings in Gloucester, Massachusetts
- National Register of Historic Places listings in Essex County, Massachusetts
- List of National Historic Landmarks in Massachusetts
