= Stellwagen Bank National Marine Sanctuary =

Marine protected area of Massachusetts, USA

Gerry E. Studds Stellwagen Bank National Marine Sanctuary
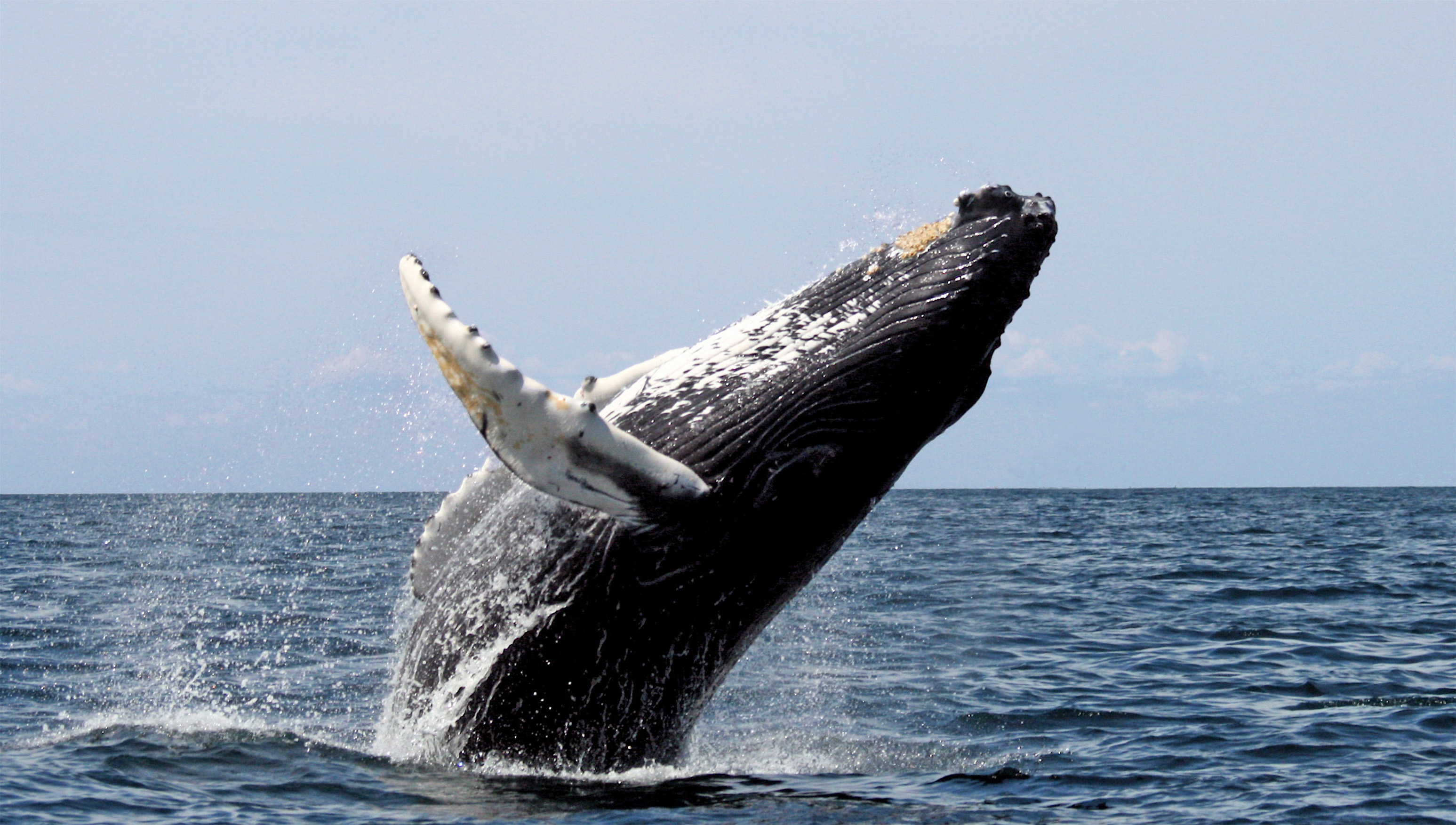
- Humpback whale breaching off the Northwest Corner

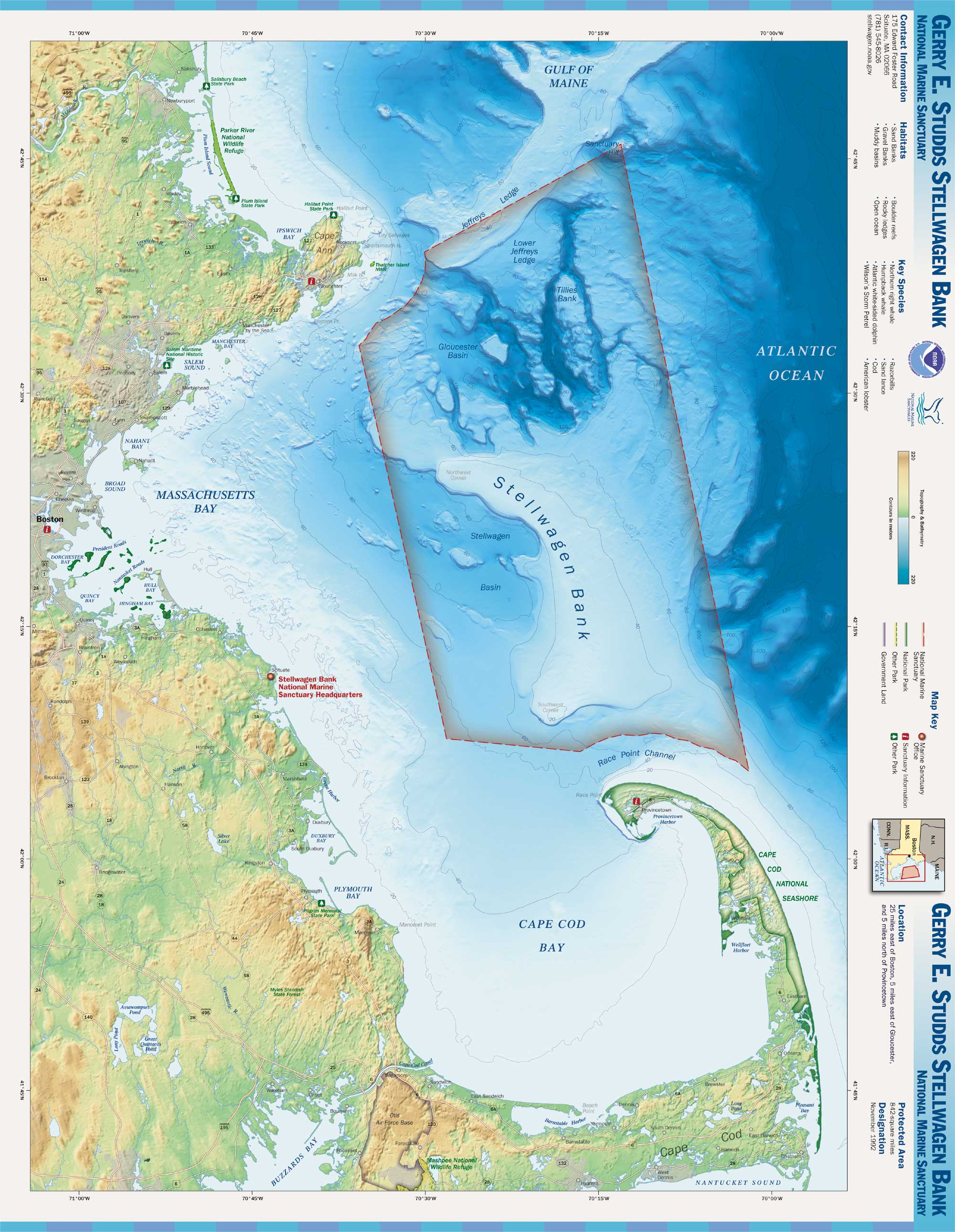
- Map of the Stellwagen Bank sanctuary
- Location: Massachusetts Bay, Massachusetts, United States
- Coordinates: 42°20′00″N 70°15′00″W
- Area: 638 sq nmi (2,190 km^{2})
- Established: November 14, 1992; 33 years ago
- Governing body: NOAA National Ocean Service
- Website: stellwagen.noaa.gov

Stellwagen Bank National Marine Sanctuary (officially the Gerry E. Studds Stellwagen Bank National Marine Sanctuary) is an 842-square-mile (636 sq nmi; 2,181 km^{2}) United States Government-protected national marine sanctuary located at the mouth of Massachusetts Bay between Cape Cod and Cape Ann. It is known as an excellent whale watching site, and is home to many other species of marine life.

The sanctuary's headquarters are located in Scituate, Massachusetts.

== Stellwagen Bank ==
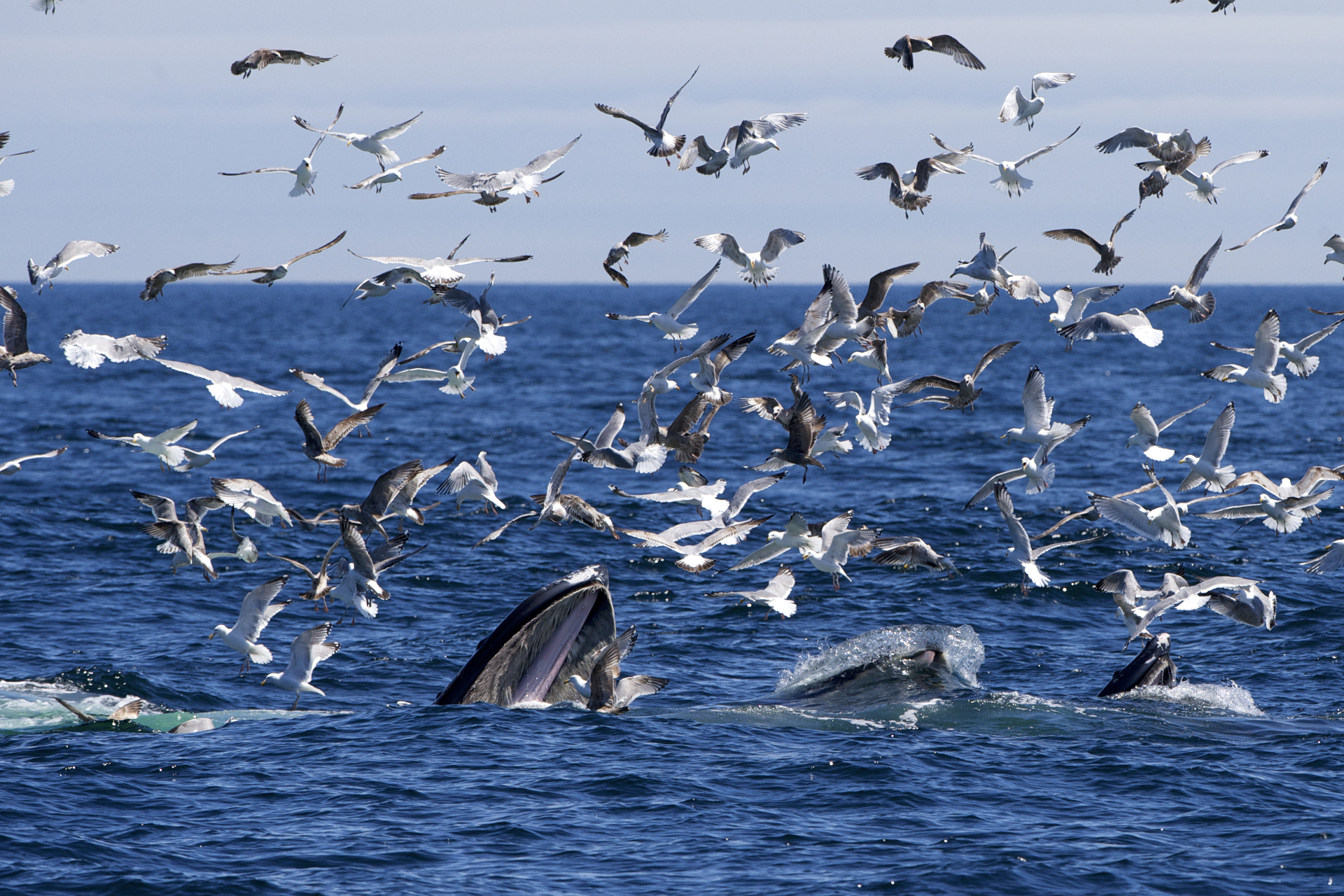
Four humpbacks feeding at Stellwagen Bank

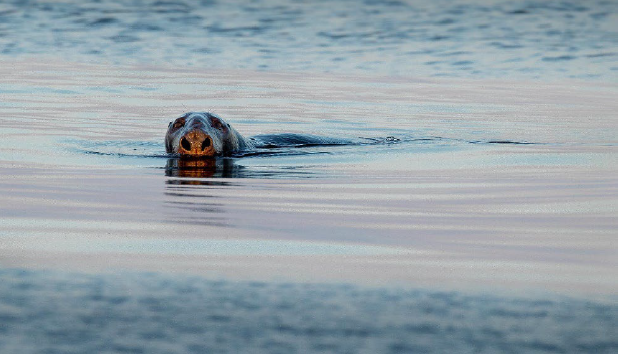
A gray seal in the sanctuary.

The sanctuary lies within Massachusetts Bay, 25 miles (40 km) east of Boston, Massachusetts, 5 miles (8.0 km) east of Gloucester, Massachusetts, and 5 miles (8.0 km) north of Provincetown, Massachusetts.

The heart of the sanctuary is Stellwagen Bank, an underwater plateau stretching 19 miles (17 nmi; 31 km) north to south, and 6 miles (5.2 nmi; 9.7 km) across at its widest near its southern end. The bank is, on average, 100 to 120 feet (30 to 37 m) below the surface, while surrounding waters to the west are over 300 feet (91 m) deep and to the northeast as deep as 600 feet (180 m).

The underwater cliff-edge of Stellwagen Bank runs parallel to the coastline and is referred to as the "shelf break." The shelf break is a steep slope which descends thousands of feet (hundreds or thousands of meters) to the ocean floor. Deep nutrient-rich ocean currents flowing along the coastline are forced upwards toward the surface when they come into contact with the steep slopes of the bank’s plateau. This creates upwelling at the shelf break, which occur because there are ocean currents flowing along the coast, slower moving water at the bottom of the ocean due to friction, stratified water separated by density, salinity, and temperature, and a dramatic change in seafloor slope. This upwelling brings nutrients to the surface for phytoplankton, which attracts larger organisms to feed.

Over 130 species from numerous classes of the animal kingdom live at Stellwagen Bank at least temporarily. Some fish found there are the Atlantic cod, silver hake, yellowtail flounder, bluefin tuna, yellowfin tuna, striped bass, bluefish and numerous species of shark including the great white shark. Shellfish such as the American lobster, sea scallops, squid, and ocean quahogs are also prevalent. Many marine birds live at Stellwagen Bank, including gannets, shearwaters, storm petrels, fulmars, puffins and razorbills. Reptiles also are present, primarily represented by the leatherback sea turtle. Possibly the most famous animals on Stellwagen Bank are its marine mammals. Five species of seals (harp seals, gray seals, harbor seals, hooded seals, and ringed seals), and numerous whale species swim in the waters of Stellwagen Bank. Whale watchers frequently can see humpback whales, minke whales and fin whales and occasionally sight of one of the most critically endangered whale species, the North Atlantic right whale. Other whale species seen include the sperm whale, beluga whale, orca, pilot whale, white-beaked dolphin, Atlantic white-sided dolphin, common dolphin, bottlenose dolphin, Risso’s dolphin, harbor porpoise, blue whale, and sei whale.

== History ==
Stellwagen Bank owes much of its existence to the last major ice age. The Laurentide Ice Sheet advanced over the eastern United States 25,000 years ago, pushing in front of it large amounts of earth and rock. The southern margin of the glaciers formed local geographical features including Cape Cod and Stellwagen Bank. Originally, the Stellwagen Bank was above water, but gradually subsided over time as the post-glacial rebound subsided.

In the 17th century it was observed that the area made for excellent fishing. Large cod and tuna were caught frequently in the area, and whaling ships caught many whales in the area.

In 1854, the United States Navy sent Lieutenant Commander Henry Stellwagen to survey and map the area. It was known that there was an ocean bank in the area, but its extent and shape were not known. Sounding could show ships how close they were to the dangerous waters of Boston Harbor, and so better maps were needed. Prior to Stellwagen's hydrographic survey, it was believed there were two small banks in the area, one just to the north of Cape Cod, and one in the middle of the entrance to Massachusetts Bay. Stellwagen showed that they were part of one large bank. As a result, the U.S. Navy named the bank after him in 1855.

On October 7, 1992, the United States Congress authorized a national marine sanctuary in the area. The National Oceanic and Atmospheric Administration designated the Stellwagen Bank National Marine Sanctuary on November 14, 1992.

In 1999, the submersible DeepWorker 2000 was used to quantify the species of fish as well as the space resources within the sanctuary. Remotely operated underwater vehicles were used from 1993 to 2003 to make additional observations of the fish within the sanctuary and adjacent waters.
