= Golden State =

Golden State may refer to:

== Places ==
- nickname of U.S. state California
- nickname of Australian state Western Australia

== Music ==
- Golden State (band), indie rock band from Los Angeles
- Golden State (album), by Bush, 2001
- Golden State EP, by KT Tunstall, 2016
- The Golden State (Mia Doi Todd album), 2002
- The Golden State (N2Deep album), 1997
- "Golden State", a song by American Hi-Fi from the 2014 album Blood & Lemonade
- "The Golden State", a song by City and Colour from the 2013 album The Hurry and the Harm"

== Transportation ==
- Golden State (clipper), launched 1853
- Golden State (schooner), launched 1913
- Golden State, later William F. Garms, a 1901 American schooner
- Golden State (train), operating between Chicago and Los Angeles 1902–1968

== Other uses ==
- Golden State, formerly part of Grizzly Peak, a themed land at Disney California Adventure Park
- Golden State Baptist College, in Santa Clara, California, U.S.
- Golden State, a 2019 novel by Ben H. Winters
- Golden State Warriors, an NBA team
- Golden State Valkyries, a WNBA team

== See also ==
- Joseph James DeAngelo (born 1945), known as the Golden State Killer
