= Castine Harbor and Town =

1851 painting by Fitz Henry Lane

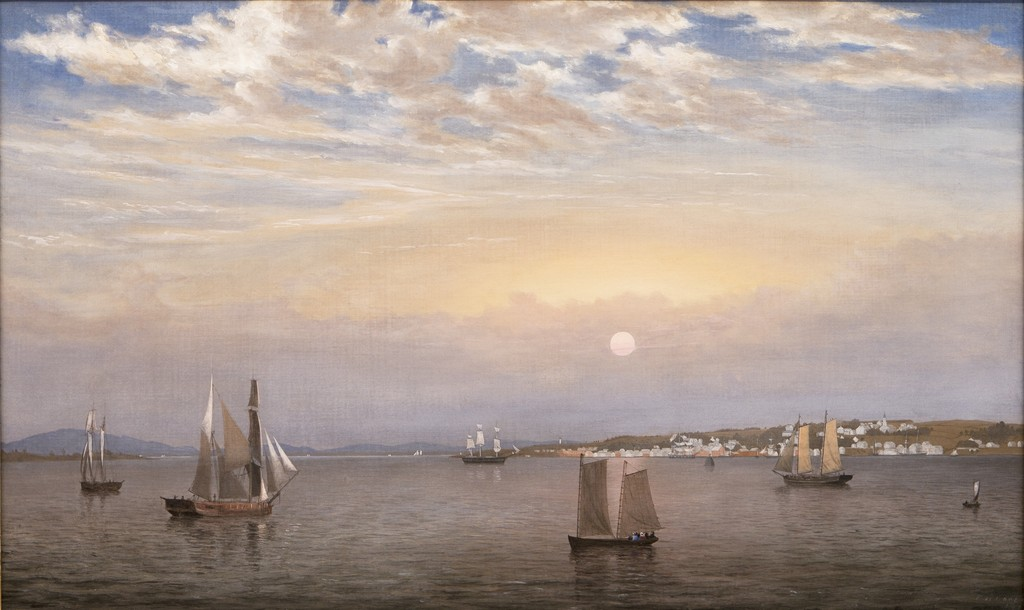
- Artist: Fitz Henry Lane
- Location: Timken Museum of Art, San Diego, California, U.S.

Castine Harbor and Town is an 1851 oil painting on canvas by Fitz Henry Lane.
