= The Golden State Entering New York Harbor =

Painting by Fitz Henry Lane

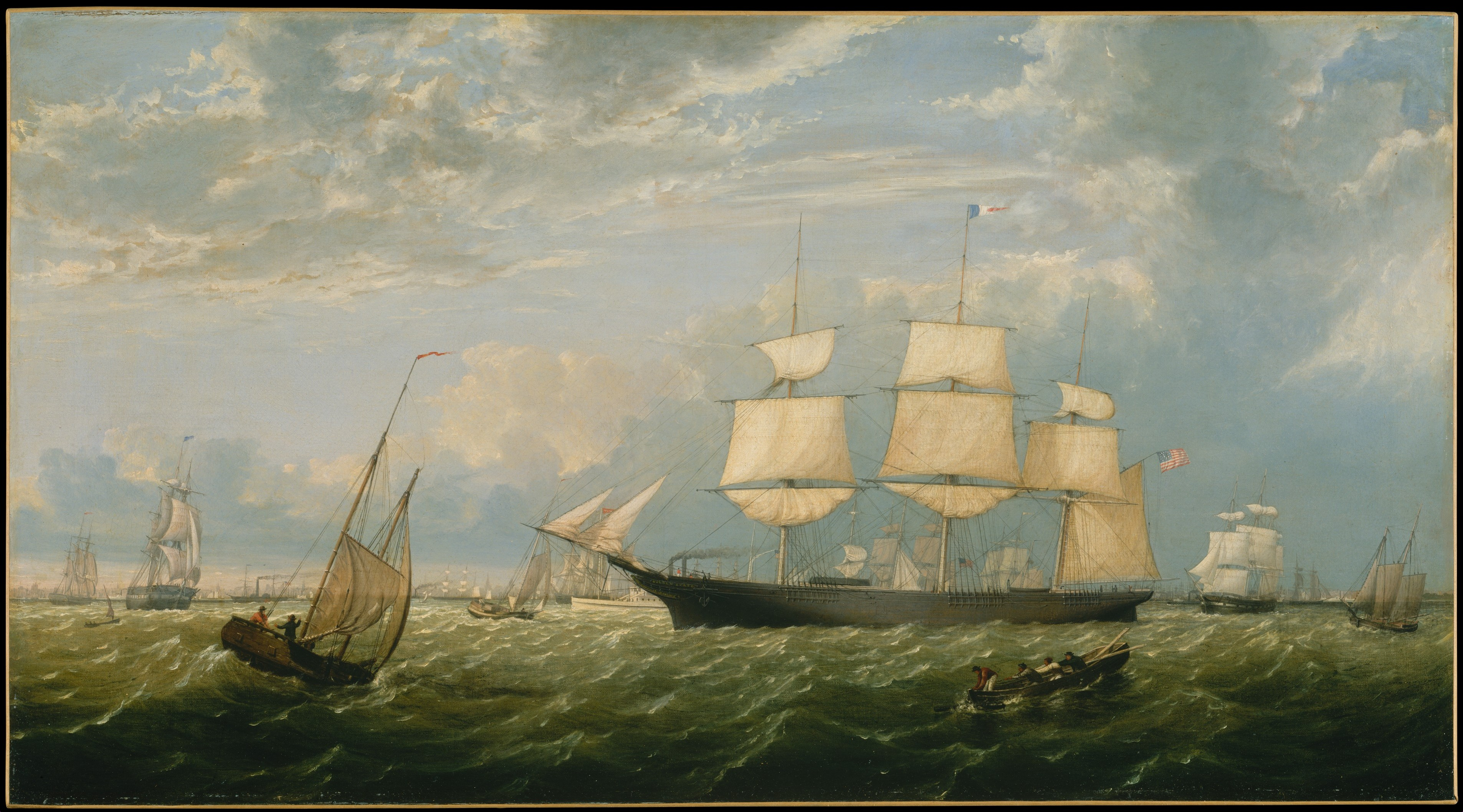
- Artist: Fitz Henry Lane
- Year: 1854
- Medium: oil paint, canvas
- Dimensions: 66 cm (26 in) × 122 cm (48 in)
- Location: Metropolitan Museum of Art
- Accession: 1974.33

The Golden State Entering New York Harbor is an 1854 painting (oil on canvass, 26" x 48' or 66 cm x 121.9 cm) of an American three-masted clipper merchant ship by Fitz Henry Lane (1804–1865). Lane was an American lithographer and a maritime painter who lived most his life in the New England fishing city of Gloucester, Massachusetts, north of Boston, Massachusetts, on Cape Ann. The painting is in the collection of the Metropolitan Museum of Art.

== Background ==
Although Lane spent much of his life in Massachusetts, he had a strong incentive during the early 1850s to spend time in New York City, a busy seaport full of activity for a maritime artist. First, Lane's work was being sold through exhibitions at New York galleries. Second, Lane was hired by Chambers & Heiser, a New York merchant shipping line, to paint the company's new vessel, Golden State. The ship, built for travel to California – during the California Gold Rush – around Cape Horn during a period when transcontinental land crossings across North America were not reliable, was launched in 1853, the same year that Westervelt was elected Mayor of New York City.

For Lane, the work in 1854 on The Golden State Entering New York Harbor was a repeat commission. Chambers & Heiser had brought him to New York during the previous year to paint the company's clipper ship Sweepstakes.

== Description ==
The Golden State Entering New York Harbor was commissioned by the owner of Golden State, Lane's second for Chambers & Heiser. It is rich in detail, depicting New York City in the background, as seen from New Jersey. A steamship is shown just past the bow of the Golden State. A variety of vessels plies New York Harbor.

=== Characteristics ===
Four stylistic characteristics are seen in The Golden State Entering New York Harbor.

First, Golden State evidences the luminism style of American landscape painting in the 1850s through the 1870s. Luminism uses careful attention to light in landscapes, aerial perspective, and concealment of visible brushstrokes to emphasize tranquility. Water is often calm and reflective; the sky is often soft and hazy. The Hudson River School typifies luminicsm in art.

Second, Golden State shows strong influence onto Lane's work from Robert Salmon (1775–1845), an English artist who lived in Boston and was the preeminent marine painter of his time. His studio was near Lane's lithography shop in Boston, where Lane lived during his early adult years. The Fitz Henry Lane Online Project notes, "[W]e have no direct evidence of contact or a teacher-student relationship. Lane's early works are so indebted to Salmon they have been confused with his in the past. In this case [i.e., Golden State], the wind-whipped waves diagonally patterned across the canvass are very much like Salmon's style, as are the light-and-dark patterns of the cloud and a tumultuous harbor scene crowded with vessels."

Third, Golden State shows a turn by Lane from landscapes and shoreline structures to maritime activity. Lane's commissions in New York City from Chambers & Heiser led to larger and more detailed, busier paintings. Additionally, Lane had established a market for his art in Boston; he wanted his New York exhibitions to add to his business success.

Fourth, Golden State as well as Sweepstakes are the only two known paintings of Lane in which he signed his full name. On Golden State, the signature reads: "Fitz Henry Lane, Gloucester, Mass. A.D. 1854." The Fitz Henry Lane Online Project speculates that Lane wanted his new clients in New York City to remember all his painting details.
