= Mary Blood Mellen =

American painter (1819–1886)

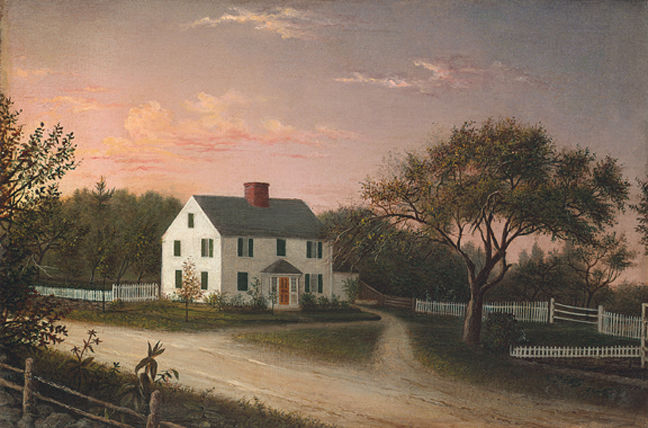
Blood Family Homestead (ca. 1859)

Mary Blood Mellen (May 13, 1819 – February 11, 1886) was an American painter who was one of several individuals (including William Bradford, Benjamin Champney (1817–1907), and George Merchant Jr.) who studied under Fitz Henry Lane (also called Fitz Hugh Lane). Mellen is one of a number of women painters associated with the Hudson River School of artists in nineteenth-century New England. Her paintings often included landscapes and maritime images. Though she spent time in New York and Connecticut, Mellen lived primarily in Massachusetts, and many of her paintings find their source in the Massachusetts and Maine landscapes and seascapes. In 1840, she married the Rev. Charles W. Mellen, a Universalist minister at a number Massachusetts churches prior to his death in 1866.

As a copyist, Mellen created studies and copies of the work of her friend and mentor Fitz Henry Lane. According to Phebe Ann Coffin Hanaford, "When [Lane] called at her residence to see the latest copy of [one of his paintings], the [Lane] and the copy were brought down together..." evidently as a lighthearted challenge to Lane, to spot which was his original. As a talented painter in her own right, Mary created numerous compositions of her own as well. Her paintings include a landscape of the Blood family home (presumably her childhood home), a representative seascape entitled Shipwreck on the Beach (1870s), and a painting that portrays ships at sea as well as a pastoral New England countryside entitled Field Beach (c 1850s). Like Lane and others associated with the Hudson River artists, Mellen painted in the luminist style popular in mid-nineteenth century America.

== Biography ==
Mary Blood was born to Reuben Blood Jr. and Sally Taylor, a couple from Sterling, Massachusetts. Though she had two older brothers, Mary was the eldest daughter and there was a considerable gap of twelve years before the next of her four younger siblings were born. In Sterling young Mary would learn to paint in watercolors. Her talents must not have gone unnoticed, for within a few years she was studying at the Frye Academy in nearby Bolton, Massachusetts, a school established in 1823 by Thomas Fry (a local Quaker) as a co-educational preparatory school. An examination of census reports from those years indicate that Mary was something of an intellectual and artistic standout in the family. None of her siblings appear to have risen from the labor class of the day.

In the 1830s, the family relocated to Fitzwilliam, New Hampshire, and by 1839 a young Universalist minister, Reverend Charles W. Mellen, would arrive to act as pastor in the neighboring town. Reverend Mellen came from a family of farmers from nearby Phillipston. He and Mary must have made one another's acquaintance quite early, for in 1840, after just a year spent living in neighboring towns, the young pair married. Charles was an eligible bachelor at the time, and with the two only a year apart in age, Charles had the proper "taste and culture... to take a lively interest in [Mary's] efforts at oil painting...".

For the next few years Charles' itinerant ministering meant that the duo were more-or-less constantly on the move. In 1846, while living in Foxborough Mary gave birth to a daughter, Amanda. The infant would live for only 48 hours. The couple never had any other children, and Amanda's gravestone reads, "Our short-lived flower returned unto God."

It is unclear how the Mellens first became acquainted with Fitz Henry Lane, but by 1845 the young couple was living just south of Boston; a time when Lane's reputation in the city was growing considerably. Charles' brother William Grenville Rolland Mellen was also a Universalist minister, and during the late 1840s was acting as pastor at the Second Society of Universalists in Cambridge. It is likely that the couple would have spent time in the city socially, visiting Charles' brother. It is not difficult to imagine a woman with Mary's artistic and cultural inclinations taking advantage of the opportunity to explore New England's cultural Mecca. The Boston Athenæum would have been a likely destination: at that time it boasted the largest art collection in New England. Lane's work would have almost certainly been on display during those years, and it is possible that Mellen became acquainted with him first through his work in this way. The next few years involved more travel for the Mellens, including a brief stint in Glen Falls, New York.

In 1855 Charles' brother William was invited to become the minister of the First Universalist Church on Middle Street in Gloucester, Massachusetts. William moved with his wife and children to a small rented house near the eastern end of Main Street, an area which would have overlooked Lane's recently build granite house on Duncan Point. That same year, Charles and Mary resettled in Weymouth, Massachusetts. While most of Mary's surviving work is undated, the Lane paintings she copied generally date from about 1855 onward. Her brother-in-law's relocation to Gloucester that same year suggests that she may have begun taking regular excursions to Gloucester from Weymouth. While the details of their professional relationship are mostly undocumented, it is known that they had collaborated, as evidenced by a small 1850s painting entitled Coast of Maine, now in the collection of the Cape Ann Museum in Gloucester, which is signed by both artists on the backside of the canvas. Mellen and Lane are also known to have traveled together in 1859 to the old Blood family home in Sterling. Both artists painted a rendition of the scene, with the two paintings depicting a different season.

By 1861 the Mellens were living in Dorchester, Massachusetts, with a short commute to Gloucester. A few years later in 1864, the couple again relocated to Taunton, Massachusetts, roughly 40 miles south of Boston. The next two years proved a difficult time for Mary as she would learn of Lane's passing in 1865, and would also lose her husband unexpectedly in 1866.

Following her husband's death, she relocated to Hartford, Connecticut, moving in with her sister-in-law, also recently widowed. Census reports from this period reveal Mary's occupation as an "artist", a distinction that had not previously been made during her time painting with Lane. Widowed and childless, this may indicate the realization of her identity as an artist in her own right. It was, at the very least, her primary source of income during those years. She is known to have owned a number of Lane's paintings, and was still engaged in creating copies. However, there is evidence suggesting a unique body of work of her own, including a series of moonlight pieces, thought to either have been a series based on a lost and unknown Lane, or perhaps "her own creations done during a time of protracted mourning for the two men who played such significant roles in her life."

In the ensuing years she moved between Taunton and her family home in Sterling, where she succumbed to typhoid in 1886. Her death certificate again specifies her occupation as an artist and several obituaries commented on her skill as a painter and the popularity of her work. Her will, which was drawn up in 1882 specifies to which niece and nephew each of her original Lanes should go. She also specified that Lane's nephew Fitz Henry Winter should receive a painting by Lane, as well as a portrait of him that was in her collection.
