= David Shaw (1805 ship) =

UK merchant ship 1805–1826

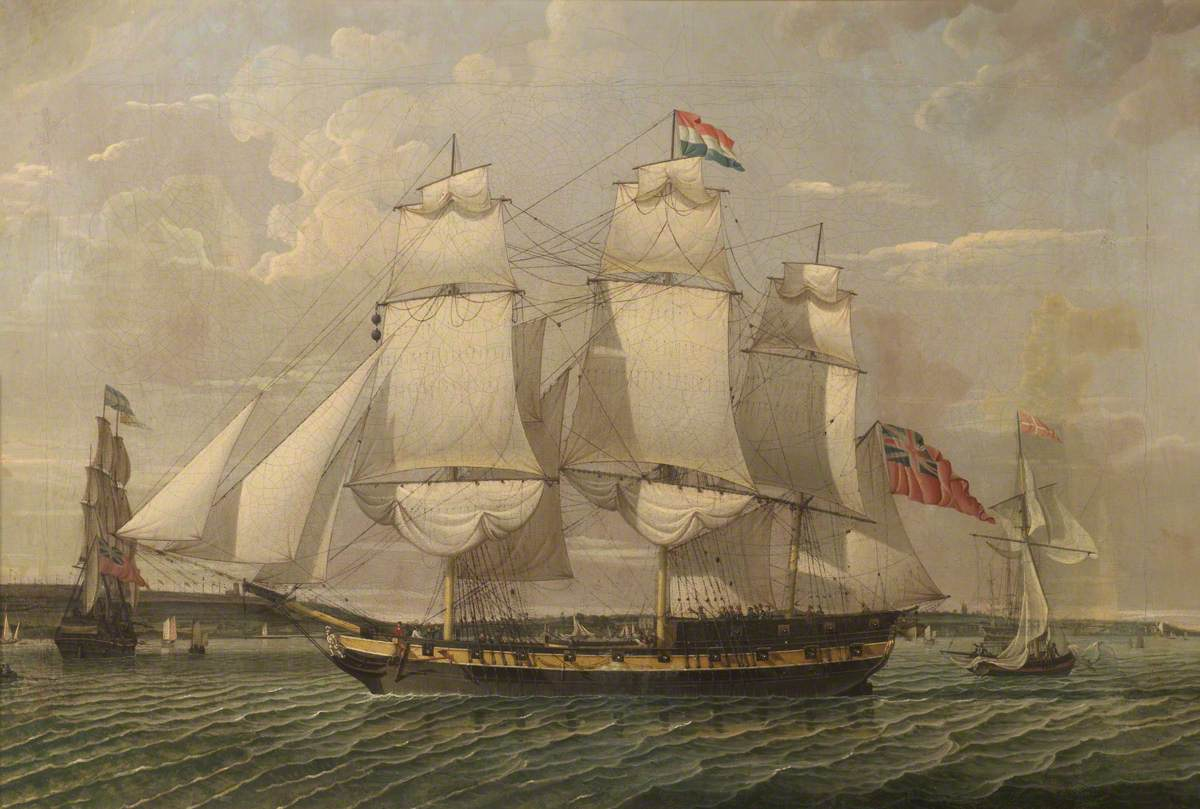
- The ship David Shaw off Bidston, Liverpool, 1807; Robert Salmon, Beacon Museum, Whitehaven

History

United Kingdom
- Name: David Shaw
- Builder: Wilson Walker, Whitehaven
- Launched: 16 December 1805, or 2 October 1806
- Fate: Abandoned prior to 3 July 1826

General characteristics
- Tons burthen: 342, or 353, or 35387/94, or 354 (bm)
- Length: 99 ft 3 in (30.3 m)
- Beam: 28 ft 11 in (8.8 m)
- Armament: 1806: 6 guns; 1810: 16 × 12 & 9–pounder guns

David Shaw was launched at Whitehaven in 1805. She quickly became a West Indiaman. Between 1817 and 1821, she made two voyages to New South Wales, returning from the second voyage via Batavia and Mauritius. She suffered a major maritime incident in 1822. Prior to 3 July 1826, her crew abandoned her at sea waterlogged.

== Career ==
David Shaw first entered Lloyd's Register (LR) in 1806.

Year	Master	Owner	Trade	Source
1806	L.Hodgin	Stitt&Co.	Whitehaven–Cork	LR
1808	L.Hodgin; Burnell	Stitt & Co.	Liverpool–Jamaica	LR

In 1806, David Shaw was already sailing to Jamaica. Between 21 and 23 August 1806, she survived a gale that caused a number of other vessels of the fleet returning from Jamaica to founder. She arrived back at Liverpool on 25 October.

In 1807 her master for at least one voyage to Jamaica was Wodall (or Woodhall) though that change did not appear in LR.

Year	Master	Owner	Trade	Source & notes
1809	J.Burnell; Colthard	Stitt&Co.	London–Jamaica	LR
1810	Colthard; Craigie	Stitt&Co.	London–Jamaica	LR
1811	J.Craigie	Pirie&Co.	London–West Indies	LR
1813	J.Craigie	Pirie&Co.	London–Rio de Janeiro	LR
1816	J.Craigie	Pirie&Co.	London–St Kitts; Plymouth–New York	LR; damages repaired 1816

On 12 November 1815, David Shaw, master, came into Plymouth. She had been on a voyage from London to New York and had reached the American coast when she encountered very bad weather that resulted in her sustaining considerable damage. It was next reported that she would have to unload to repair.

Year	Master	Owner	Trade	Source & notes
1818	D.Karr	Pirie & Co.	London–New South Wales	LR; damages repaired 1816 & good repair 1817

In 1813, the British East India Company (EIC) had lost its monopoly on the trade between India and Britain. British ships were then free to sail to India or the Indian Ocean under a licence from the EIC. Lloyd's Register showed David Shaw, Kerr, master, sailing for Bombay on 29 May 1817, as a licensed ship. However, David Shaw, Carr, master, sailed from England on 13 September 1817. She sailed via Madeira and Rio de Janeiro and arrived at Sydney on 9 February 1818, having brought a cargo of merchandise. On 21 May, she sailed for England. David Shaw, Kerr, master, arrived off Dover in December.

Year	Master	Owner	Trade	Source & notes
1819	D.Karr; J.Jordaine	Pirie&Co. Whiting & Co.	London–New South Wales	LR; damages repaired 1816 & good repair 1817

On 10 June 1819, David Shaw, Jordain, master, sailed again for New South Wales. By October she had arrived at Hobart. On 16 November, she arrived at Port Jackson. On 24 December, David Shaw sailed for Calcutta via Batavia; she arrived at Batavia on 13 February 1820. On 4 July, David Shaw, Jordain, master, sailed from Mauritius, bound for Batavia again. (Note: When David Shaw cleared Customs outbound from Mauritius on 29 June 1820, she was carrying two enslaved people, a man and a woman, property of Mlle. P. Dassein.) On 16 November, she had returned to Mauritius from Batavia. She left Mauritius on 11 January 1821, arrived at St Helena on 17 February, and sailed for England the next day. On 30 April, she was in the Downs.

Year	Master	Owner	Trade	Source & notes
1822	J.Jordain; Harrison	Whiting & Co.	Cowes	LR; good repair 1817, & damages & thorough repair 1821

On 8 June 1822, David Shaw was at 46°27′N 43°53′W, on her way from Wexford to Quebec. Sh arrived on 31 June, with 231 settlers. The voyage from Westport, Ireland had taken 41 days.

David Shaw was on her way from Quebec to Belfast when she ran on shore at Wexford. The next day she drifted to the east of Cork, waterlogged and without a rudder. After fruitless attempts at rescue, she was left adrift about 10 miles SSE of Old Head. Her crew refused to leave. On 22 September, she was seen passing Castlehaven without anyone aboard. HMRC Kite towed David Shaw into Crookhaven, County Cork on 25 September.

Year	Master	Owner	Trade	Source & notes
1823	Harrison	Battersby	Liverpool–Newport	LR; damages & large repair 1821 and damages repaired 1823
1824	Harrison	Battersby	Liverpool–Belfast; Liverpool–Halifax	LR; damages & large repair 1821 and damages repaired 1823
1826	J.Smith; Rank	Powell & Co.	Cork; Liverpool–Pictou	LR; damages & large repair 1821 and damages repaired 1823

Captain Smith sailed David Scott to Campeachy.

== Fate ==
On 3 July 1826, the transport Victory came upon David Shaw in the Atlantic Ocean. Her crew had abandoned David Scott; Victory believed that David Scott had struck an iceberg. On 8 August, Martha, Samways, master, had come upon David Shaw at 46°N 45°W, waterlogged, dismasted, and with no one aboard. David Shaw, of Liverpool, had been on her way from Pictou to Liverpool. She was carrying a cargo of timber.

David Shaw had struck an iceberg off the Newfoundland Banks and a falling spar had killed her master. Hope, sailing from Liverpool to Miramichi, picked up the crew. (This account gives the date of the accident as 23 July, which is inconsistent with the other accounts that state that David Shaw had been abandoned prior to 3 July.)
