= Robert Cooke (artist) =

American painter and lithographer (1815–1843)

- Born: 1815; Boston, Massachusetts, US
- Died: September 16, 1843 (aged 27–28) near the Barrière de l'Étoile, Paris, France
- Education: Pendleton Lithographic Co.
- Known for: Painting, lithography

Robert Cooke was a portrait painter and lithographer of sheet music covers, portraits, buildings and city views in 19th century Boston.

== Early career ==
Cooke began his career as a lithographer, apprenticing under William Pendleton at Pendleton Lithographic Co. in Boston. In 1835, he assumed the position of chief draftsman for Pendleton, taking over the position from Thomas Moore. Cooke held that position until 1839 when he left to open a studio with Benjamin Champney, his roommate, friend and fellow artist.

Cooke met with immediate acclaim as a painter but, despite this, continued to augment his income through the production of lithographs. This included "at least thirty original illustrations for sheet music covers, primarily for B.W. Thayer and Company" that he executed between 1839-1840. This supplementary work was likely undertaken as part of Cooke and Champney's efforts at this time to save up funds for a trip to Europe - however, it is also possible he derived personal pleasure from the work as he was a musician himself, "accomplished on both the piano and the flute."

== In Paris ==
By the spring of 1841, Cooke and Champney had accumulated sufficient funds to make their trip, setting sail from New York City on May 1, 1841 for France. The two arrived at Le Havre but did not spend much time there, moving on to Paris by way of Rouen. Once in Paris, the two artists settled at the Hotel Bergère Cité Bergère, a hotel that had been recommended to them by a fellow passenger on their ship. They made short work of settling in and embarking on their "artistic studies." Stephen A. Schoff, the engraver, who they had known in the States, gave them the benefit of "his knowledge and experience" and soon Cooke and Champney had secured a studio with rooms in the Rue de Lille, Faubourg St. Germain. Fellow Bostonian, G.P.A. Healey "who was then well and prosperously established in Paris" also helped guide the newcomers and was instrumental in their joining an atelier "for drawing and painting from life" run by "an old model named Boudin, where for a few francs a month [they] could practice from the nude."

Work at the atelier began at 6am which necessitated Cooke and Champney to rise every morning at 5am in order to get there on time by foot. The model would then pose for one hour and everyone would take a 15 minute break at 7am. Their four hours of study concluded at 11am, at which time they would go, "to the Louvre gallery, either to draw from the antique among the Elgin marbles, or to begin copies of the paintings we fancied." Champney wrote of this time: "my friend Cooke, showing so marked a talent in heads and figures, was persuaded by some [English artists] to try sundry of their portraits, and he was successful, painting soon after one of a famous correspondent of the London Times, or Chronicle - a Mr. Crowe, as I remember - and thus he was in a fair way of getting on, and soon it became necessary for him to take a studio more convenient for him and his sitters."

Cooke's new studio was located on the Boulevard des Capucins and Champney was left in sole possession of their Rue de Lille studio.

== Death ==
In 1842 or the early part of 1843, "Cooke, who was just beginning to be successful in a career of portrait painting among the English and Americans in Paris, was stricken with a dangerous illness." Cooke was sent to the hospital for a "difficult operation" which proved unsuccessful. A second operation followed, after which he "languished in the hospital for three months, losing strength and courage."

At this juncture, Cooke's friends, including Champney, determined that it would be better for his health to be in more country-like surroundings. They "found a little house and garden near the Barrière de l'Etoile, a place at that time much like the country." An elderly English lady was hired to nurse him but, "although Cooke gained somewhat by the change of air and scene, still the dread disease was then sapping his life. Physicians visited him and endeavored to alleviate his condition, but vainly, and he languished for months."

Eventually, Cooke's funds ran out, but his friends rallied to support him - this included organizing a private benefit concert that "yielded a net profit of 1000 francs." Another group of fellow Americans raised 1500 francs towards his care. Champney continued to visit his friend until the end, remarking "I went into the country every day for the purpose of making studies from nature... On my return at night I would stop to see [Cooke] and show him the result of my day's work which always interested him... This continued for many weeks. I had at last come to the conclusion that nothing could be done to save him, and early in the autumn he died."

On October 9, 1843, the Boston Courier reported that Cooke had died of consumption in Paris on September 16 at the age of 28.

== Legacy ==
More than 50 years after Cooke's death, Champney would write: "he would have become one of the most brilliant and characteristic of American portrait painters, I have not a doubt today, and I have by me now some work of his which fully bears me out in stating this. I am not sure but I might say he would have been a remarkable man in composition and figure painting had not his studies been so suddenly arrested... There is only one painting of his in Boston on exhibition, and that is in the Boston Museum on Tremont street [sic]. It is a copy of Poussin's 'Judgement of Solomon' in the Louvre."

== Collections ==
Existing collections that contain works by Robert Cooke:

- Museum of Fine Arts, Boston
- National Portrait Gallery (United States)
- National Gallery of Art
- Boston Athenæum
- American Antiquarian Society

Past collections that once contained Robert Cooke's work:

- Boston Museum and Gallery of Fine Arts
