= Golden State (clipper) =

1852 American clipper ship

Coordinates: 43.5631°N 70.1993°W

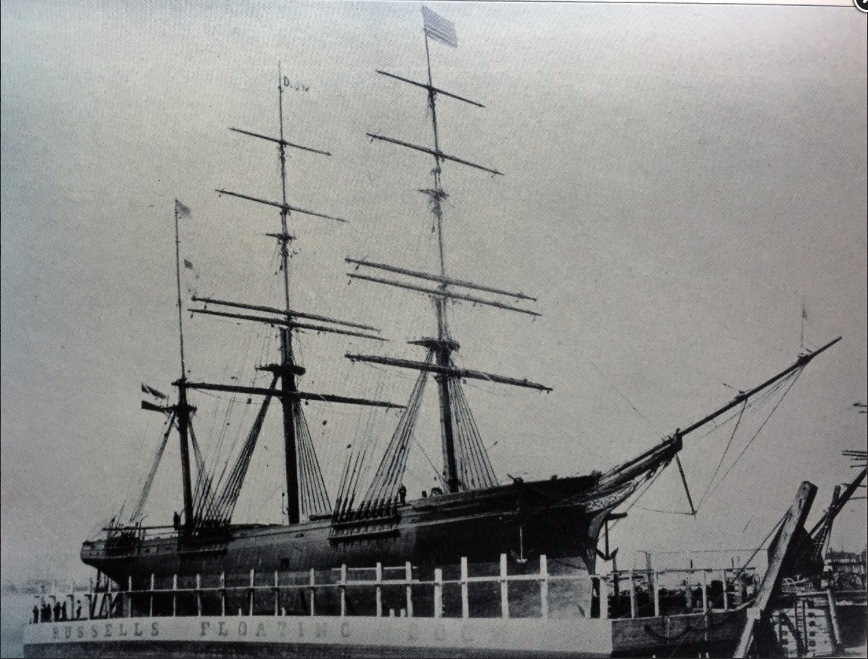
- Anne C. Maguire docked at Quebec, 1884
- Name: 1853: Golden State; 1883: Anne C. Maguire
- Owner: 1853: Chambers & Heiser, New York; 1855: AA Low & Brother, New York; 1883: D&J Maguire, Quebec
- Builder: Jacob Aaron Westervelt
- Launched: January 10, 1853
- Fate: Wrecked, December 1888

General characteristics
- Type: Clipper
- Tons burthen: 1363
- Length: 188 ft (57 m)
- Beam: 39 ft 8 in (12.09 m)
- Depth of hold: 21 ft 6 in (6.55 m)?

Golden State was an extreme clipper ship built by Jacob Aaron Westervelt in 1852 in New York City and launched on January 10, 1853. In 1883 she was renamed Anne C. Maguire.

== History ==
She left New York City on her maiden voyage on February 8, bound for San Francisco under the command of Captain L. F. Doty. All three of her topsails were carried away on February 10, forcing her to put into Rio de Janeiro for repairs, departing on April 6 and reaching her destination on July 12. She left San Francisco on August 2 for Shanghai, arriving there 54 days later. Golden State stopped at Anjer and Deal, Kent, arriving at the latter on February 9, 1854. She then returned to New York in ballast.

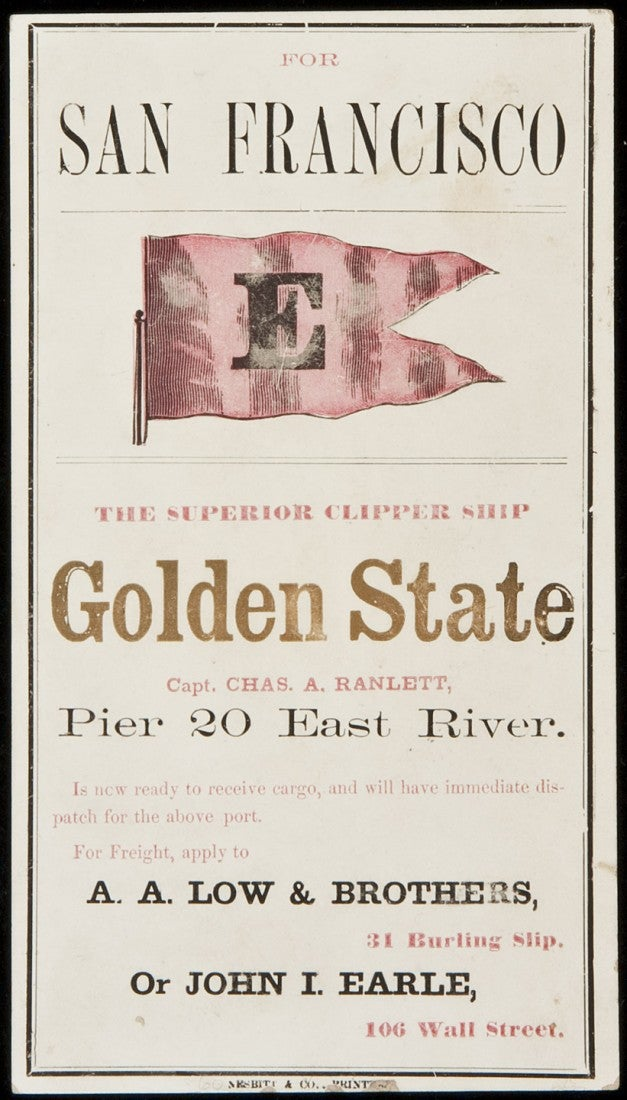
Sailing card for Golden State from New York to San Francisco

Her second voyage was under Captain Barstow. Golden State left New York City on May 25, 1854, reached San Francisco on September 28, departed on October 14 and arrived at Shanghai 42 days later. She then sailed for New York on January 1, 1855, arriving 88 1/2 days later. Originally built for Chambers & Heiser, she was sold in 1855 to AA Low & Brother. Her next two voyages saw her make port at San Francisco, Hong Kong and Foo Chow. Captain Hepburn took command for her fifth voyage, departing New York City on March 19, 1857, taking 93 days to reach Hong Kong and 93 days from Foo Chow to New York City.

On her next voyage, a mutiny broke out off Penang on the way to Hong Kong. The mutineers fled to Penang after beating the officers and boatswain with handspikes, but were captured; the first mate died of his injuries.

In the early 1860s, she worked in the grain and guano trades. In 1864, she returned to the China-Far East trade, delivering the largest cargo of tea to New York, valued at $1 million, in May 1867. In 1869, she underwent a major overhaul. Eventually, she was rerigged as a bark.

Golden State began her last voyage as an American ship on January 18, 1883, departing New York City for Anjer. She put into Rio de Janeiro due to a bad leak, and was sold to D. & J. Maguire of Quebec, who renamed her Anne C. Maguire and registered her in Argentina. She plied the Atlantic until December 1886, when she went aground and broke up at Cape Elizabeth, Maine.

== Paintings ==
Golden State is the subject of several paintings: The Golden State Entering New York Harbor (1854) by Fitz Henry Lane, The American extreme clipper "Golden State" by Leslie Arthur Wilcox and The clipper ship Golden State crossing the ocean (1888) by Antonio Jacobsen.
