= Fitz Henry Lane House =

Historic house in Massachusetts, United States

- U.S. National Register of Historic Places
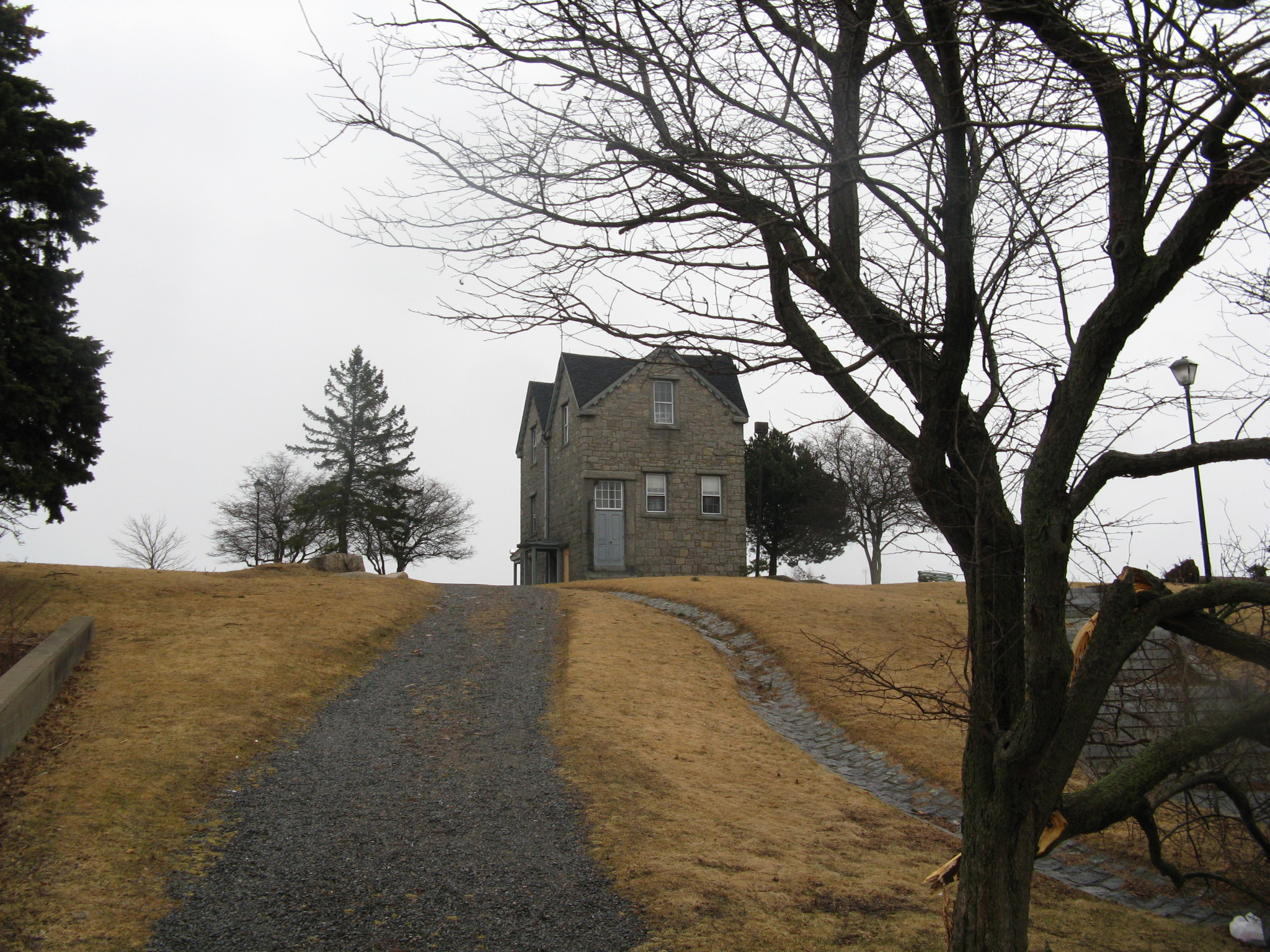

- Location within Massachusetts Location within the United States
- Location: Gloucester, Massachusetts
- Coordinates: 42°36′41″N 70°39′36″W
- Built: 1849
- Architect: Fitz Henry Lane (1804-1865)
- Architectural style: Gothic Revival
- NRHP reference No.: 70000837
- Added to NRHP: July 1, 1970

The Fitz Henry Lane House is a historic house at 8 Harbor Loop Road, on the harbor side of Rogers Street in Gloucester, Massachusetts. The three-story stone Gothic Revival building was designed and built in 1849 by the artist Fitz Henry Lane, and was his home until his death in 1865. The building now sits in a municipal park, and has a commanding view of the harbor.

The house was listed on the National Register of Historic Places in 1970. At that time, it was known as the "Fitz Hugh Lane House," but the Register changed the name in 2010.

== See also ==
- National Register of Historic Places listings in Gloucester, Massachusetts
- National Register of Historic Places listings in Essex County, Massachusetts
