= Robert Salmon =

English painter

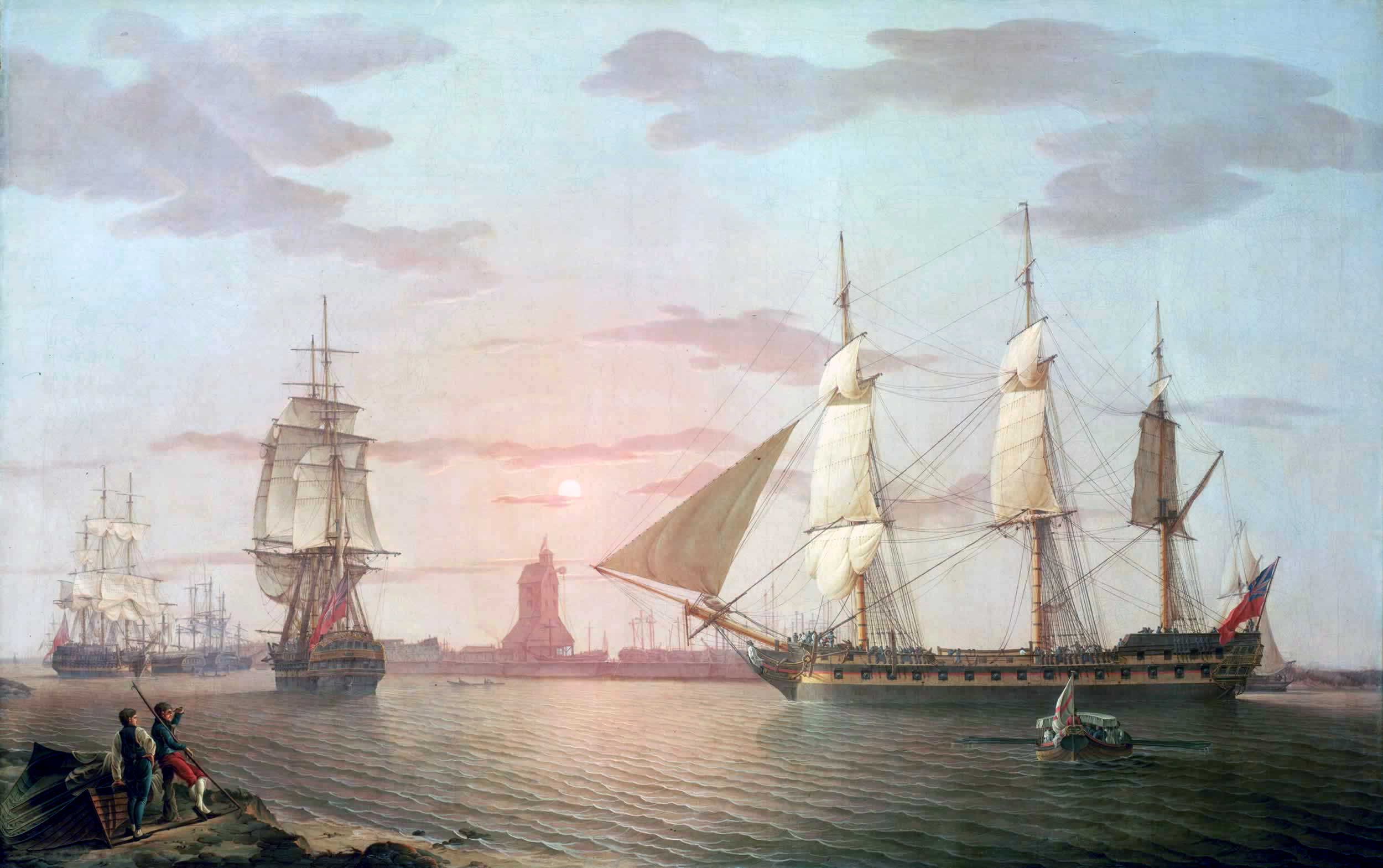
- The East Indiaman "Warley", 1804. National Maritime Museum, Greenwich, England
- Born: Robert Salomon; 1775; Whitehaven, Cumberland, England
- Died: 1845 (aged 70+); Cumberland, after 1845 (exact date uncertain)
- Known for: Maritime art, Seascapes
- Notable work: Picture of "The Dream" Pleasure Yacht, View of Venice
- Movement: Luminism

Robert Salmon (1775 – c. 1845) was a maritime artist, active in both England and America. Salmon completed nearly 1,000 paintings, all save one of maritime scenes or seascapes. He is widely considered the Father of American Luminism.

== Early life in England ==
Salmon was born in Whitehaven, Cumberland, England in October or November, 1775 as Robert Salomon; he was christened on 5 November 1775 in Whitehaven. His father, Francis Salomon, was a jeweler. The young Salmon clearly studied the work of Dutch marine painters of the 17th century, the Italian painters of vedute, and the work of Claude Lorrain, but little else is known of his early training. His earliest known works, Two Armed Merchantmen Leaving Whitehaven Harbor and The ‘Estridge’ Off Dover are dated 1800; the first work he exhibited at the Royal Academy was in 1802.

He settled in the busy seaport of Liverpool in 1806 and changed his name from Salomon to Salmon. Many of his marine paintings from this early period survive, and are housed in the National Maritime Museum in London. His ship portraits indicate he had a familiarity with sailing ships and an intimate knowledge of how they worked. These portraits tend to follow his traditional practice of showing the same vessel in at least two positions on the same canvas. In April, 1811 he moved from the Liverpool area to Greenock, Scotland and then back to Liverpool in October 1822. In 1826 he returned to Greenock, then he left for London in 1827, and shortly thereafter he went to Southampton, North Shields and Liverpool.

Along with many other young artists, Salmon believed that his artistic future lay in the United States. Before his departure in 1828, the artist executed his only extant portrait, Portrait of the Corsair, John Paul Jones, a work very much a part of the Romantic ethos of his time. He assumed his "likeness" of Paul Jones would form a bond with the viewers in his future home. He could not know, having never been to America, that the memory of America's greatest naval hero had effectively vanished in the public mind before the painting was completed.

== Emigration to America and life in Boston ==
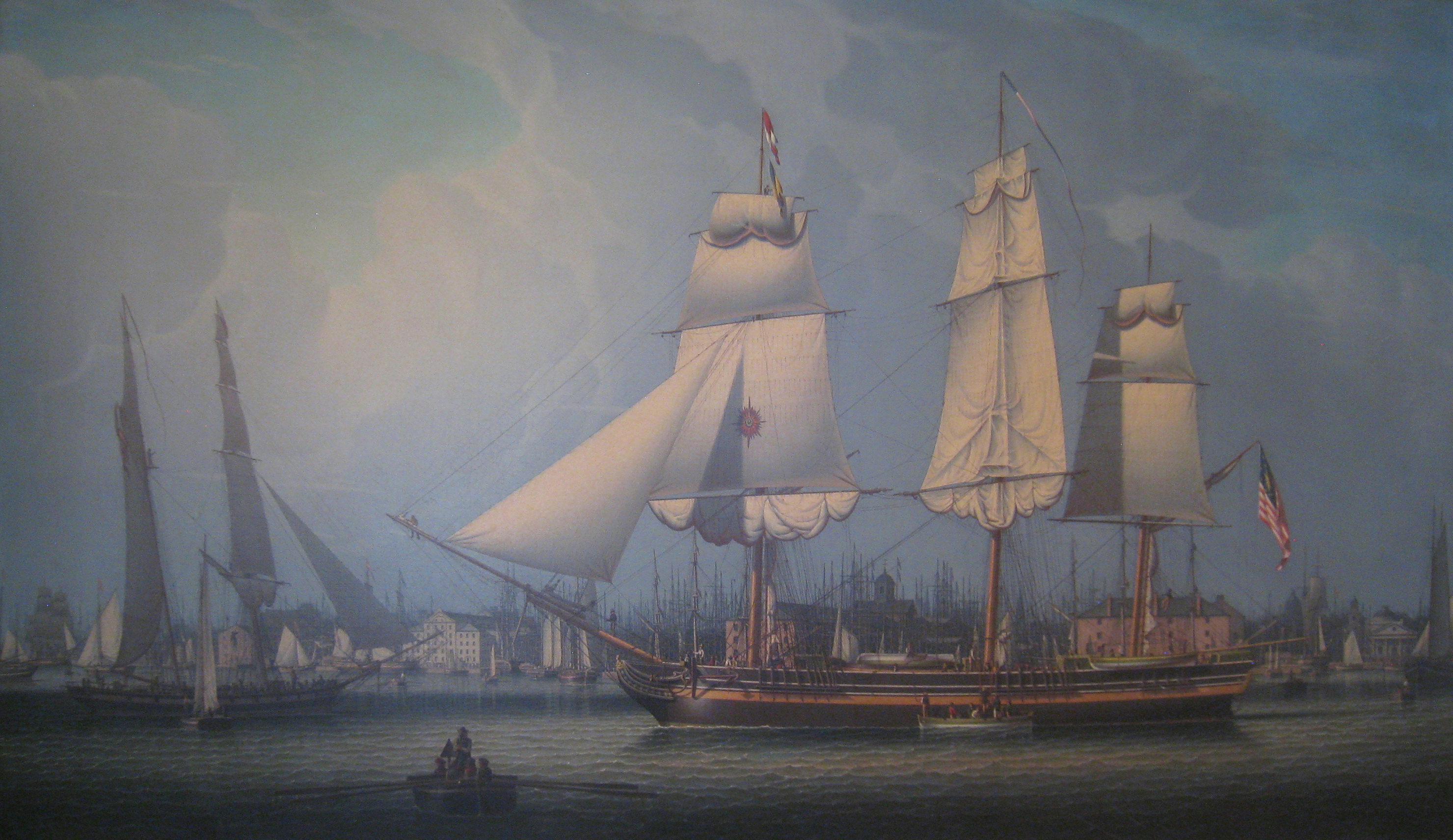
Wharves of Boston, 1829

In 1828, Salmon left Europe for the United States on the packet ship, "New York", arriving on New Years Day, 1829 and staying until 1840. Living in a small hut on Marine Railway Wharf overlooking Boston Harbor, Salmon prospered as a marine painter, accepting commissions to paint ship portraits. During the growth of Boston Harbor in the first half of the century, Salmon painted between 300-400 paintings of the harbor, in the style of 17th-century Dutch genre painting. He was thought to be an eccentric, solitary and irascible man.

Salmon soon became one of the most prominent Boston seascape painters. During the ensuing years, he divided his time between painting and working in the lithographic studio of William S. Pendleton, where he encountered William Bradford and Fitz Henry Lane. This contact between Lane and Salmon was of great importance to Lane, and became evident in his marine views.

During his lifetime, Salmon's work was very popular, and was collected by Bostonians Samuel Cabot, Robert Bennett Forbes, and John Newmarch Cushing.

== Later years ==
Salmon left Boston in 1842 and for many years was believed to have died shortly after his leaving there. Instead, he returned to Europe and went to Italy. A number of Italian views attributed to him have survived, the latest of which is dated 1845, the year of his last documented work. The actual date of his death remains uncertain.

Salmon's works can be found at the U.S. Naval Academy; Museum of Fine Arts, Boston; National Maritime Museum, Greenwich; Walker Art Gallery, Liverpool; New Britain Museum of American Art, Connecticut; Yale Center for British Art, New Haven, Connecticut; Mariners Museum, Newport News, Virginia; William A. Farnsworth Art Museum, Rockland, Maine; Peabody Essex Museum of Salem; Shelburne Museum, Vermont; the Worcester Art Museum, Massachusetts; and the Channel Islands Maritime Museum, Oxnard, CA; Saint Louis Art Museum, St. Louis, MO.

== Gallery ==
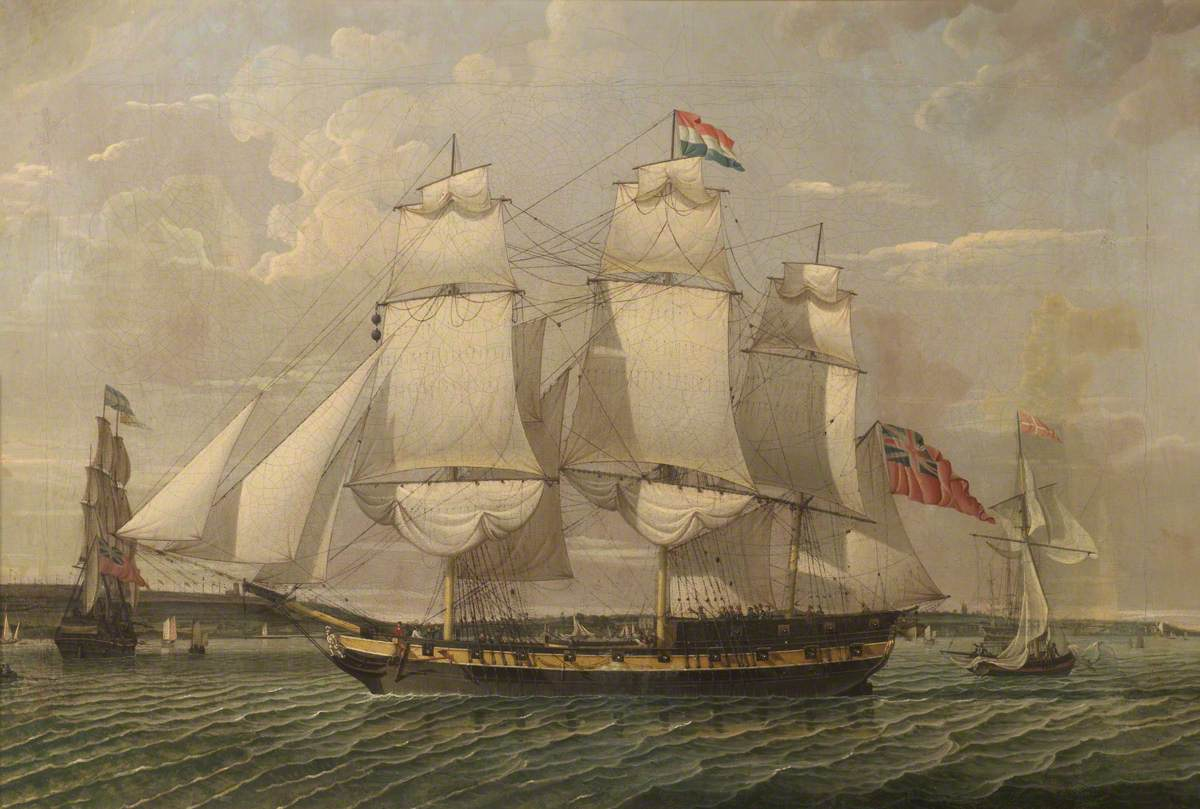
The ship David Shaw off Bidston, Liverpool, 1807, Beacon Museum, Whitehaven

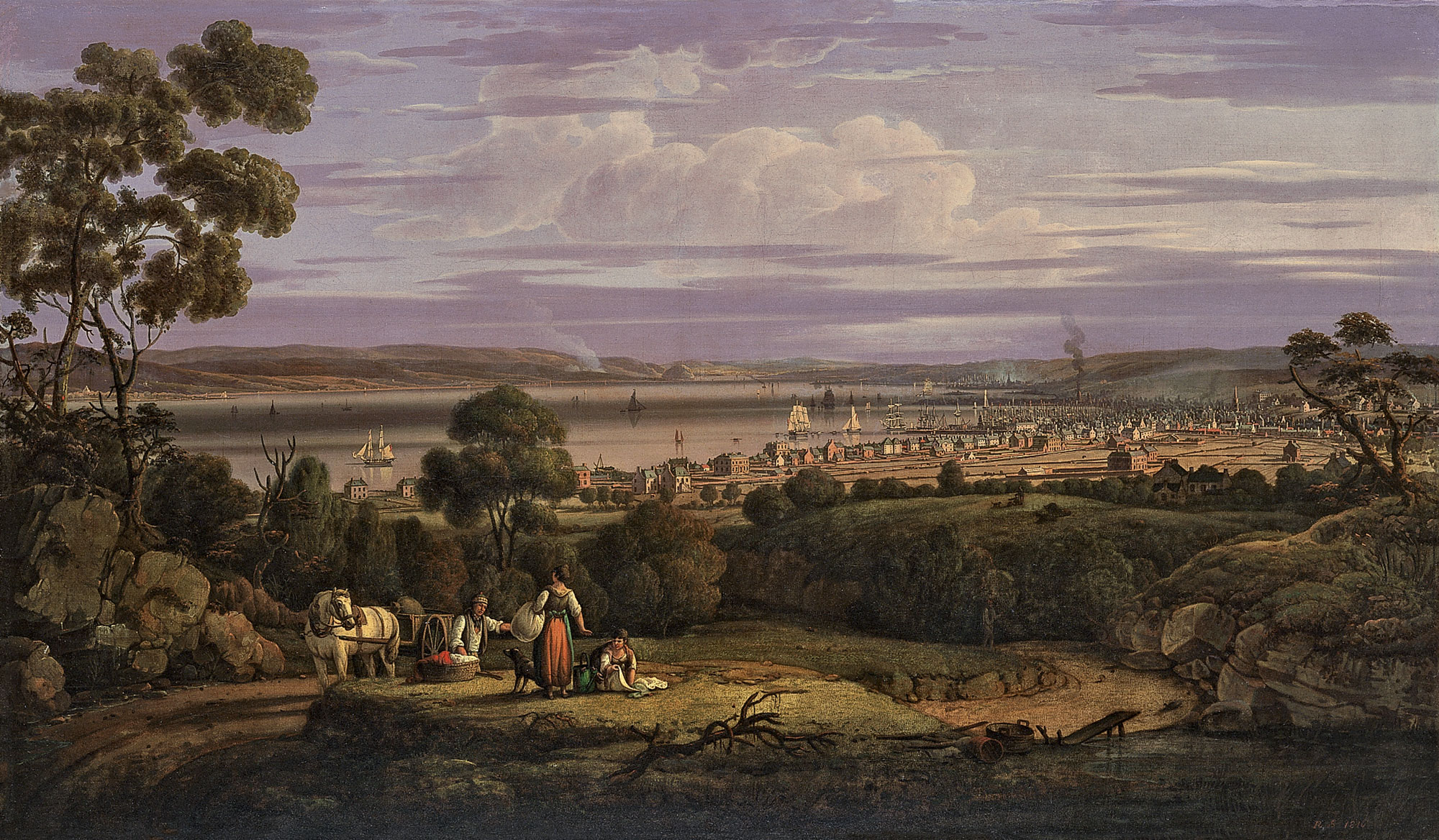
View of Greenock, Scotland, 1816. Museo Thyssen-Bornemisza.

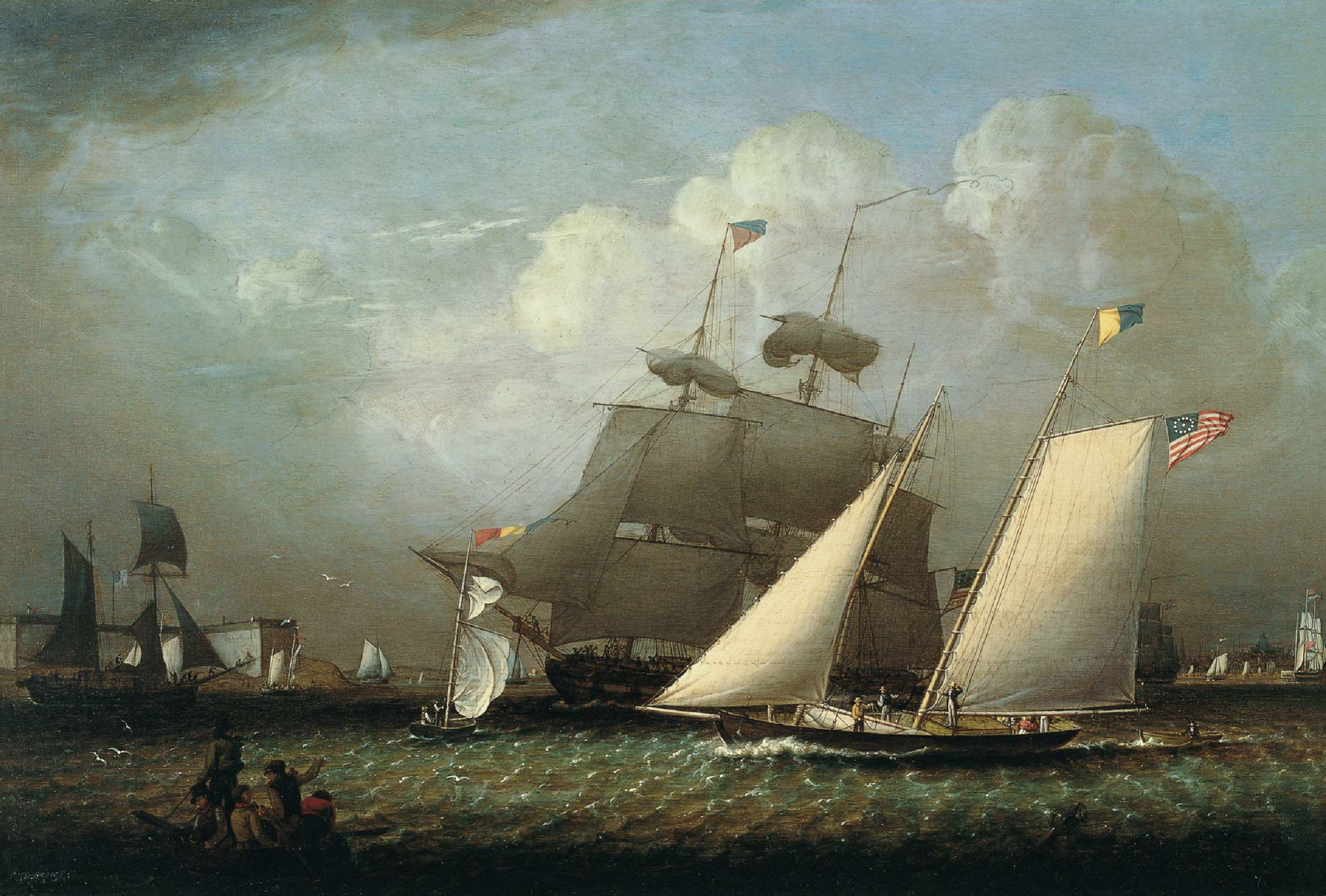
Picture of 'The Dream' Pleasure Yacht, 1839. Museo Thyssen-Bornemisza.

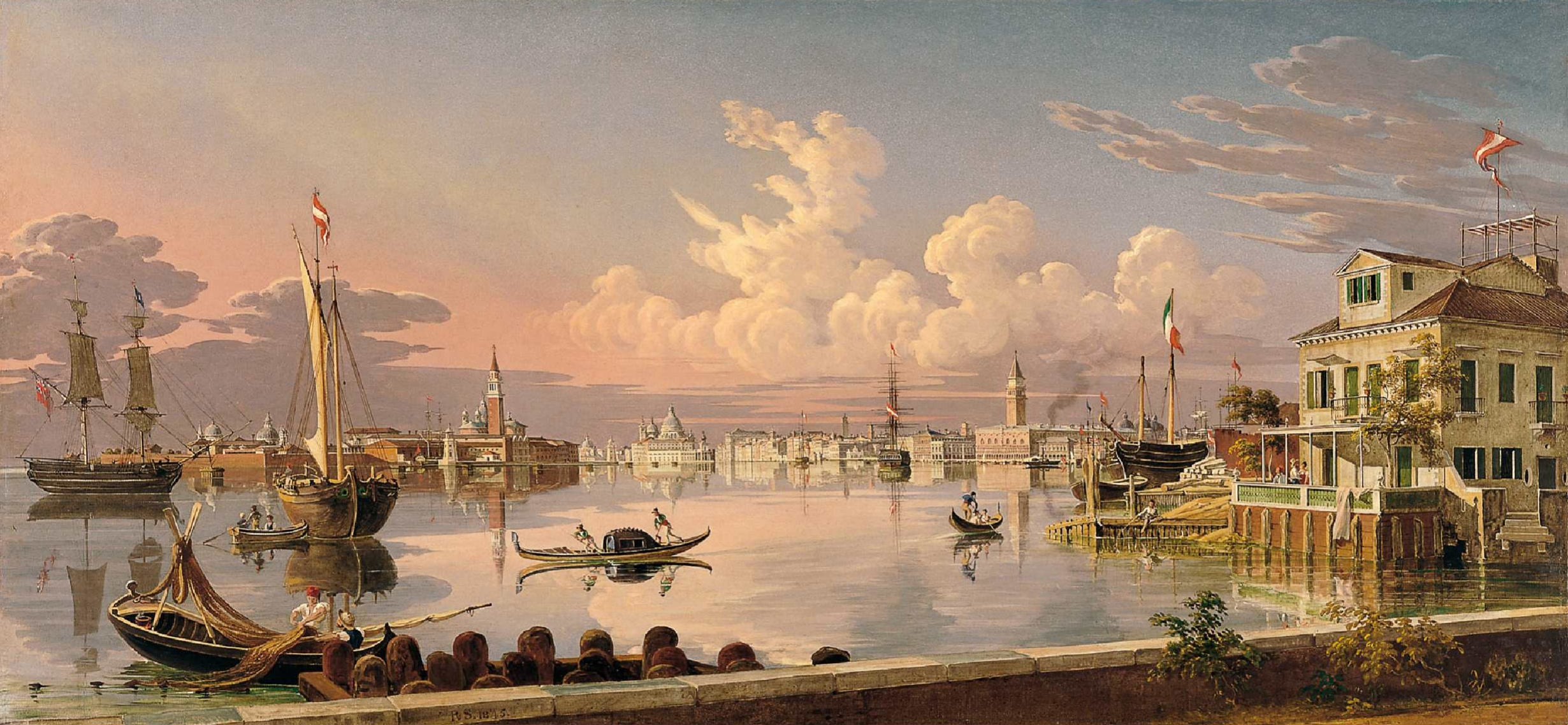
View of Venice, 1845. Museo Thyssen-Bornemisza.

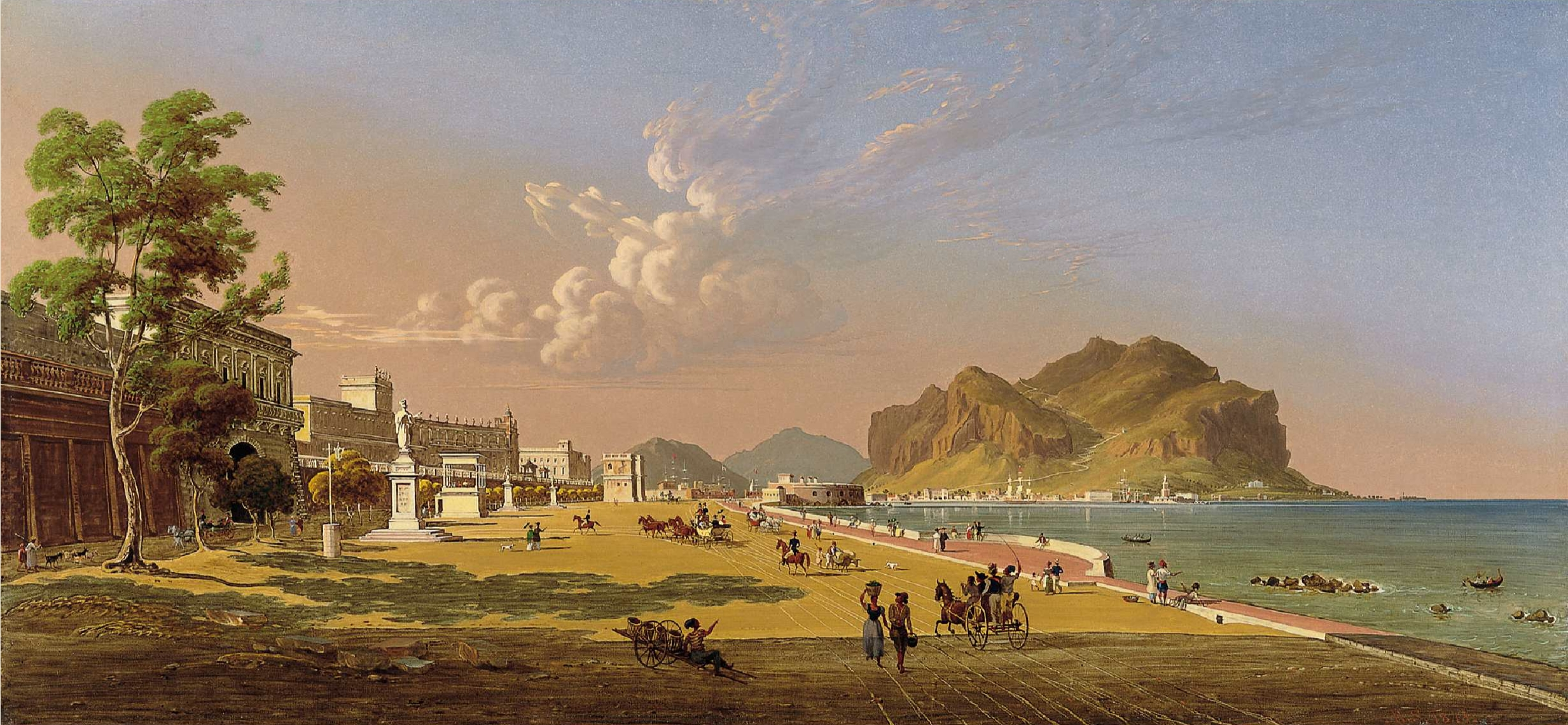
View of Palermo, 1845. Museo Thyssen-Bornemisza.
