= Barrière de l'Étoile =

Monument in Paris, France, 1780s–1850s

- Barrière de l'Étoile
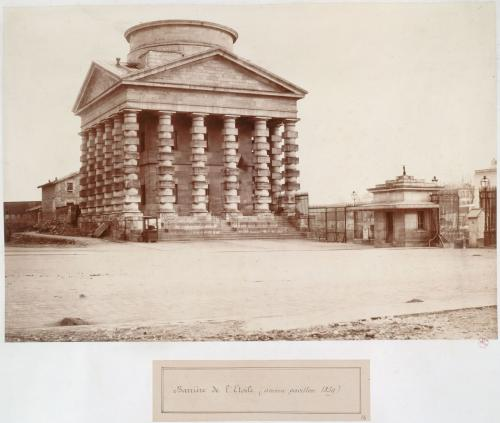
- A photograph of one side of the Barrière de l'Étoile taken by Charles Marville in 1859.
- Interactive map of the Barrière de l'Étoile area
- Alternative names: Barrière des Champs-Élysées or Barrière de Neuilly

General information
- Location: Paris, France
- Coordinates: 48°52′24″N 2°17′48″E
- Construction started: 1785
- Completed: 1789
- Demolished: c. 1857–1860

Design and construction
- Architect: Claude Nicolas Ledoux

The Barrière de l'Étoile was a monument on the eastern edge of the Place de l'Étoile. It was constructed between 1785-1789 and destroyed after 1857 to clear the way for Haussmann's renovation of Paris. For the duration of its existence, the surrounding area was "much like the country."

== Gallery ==
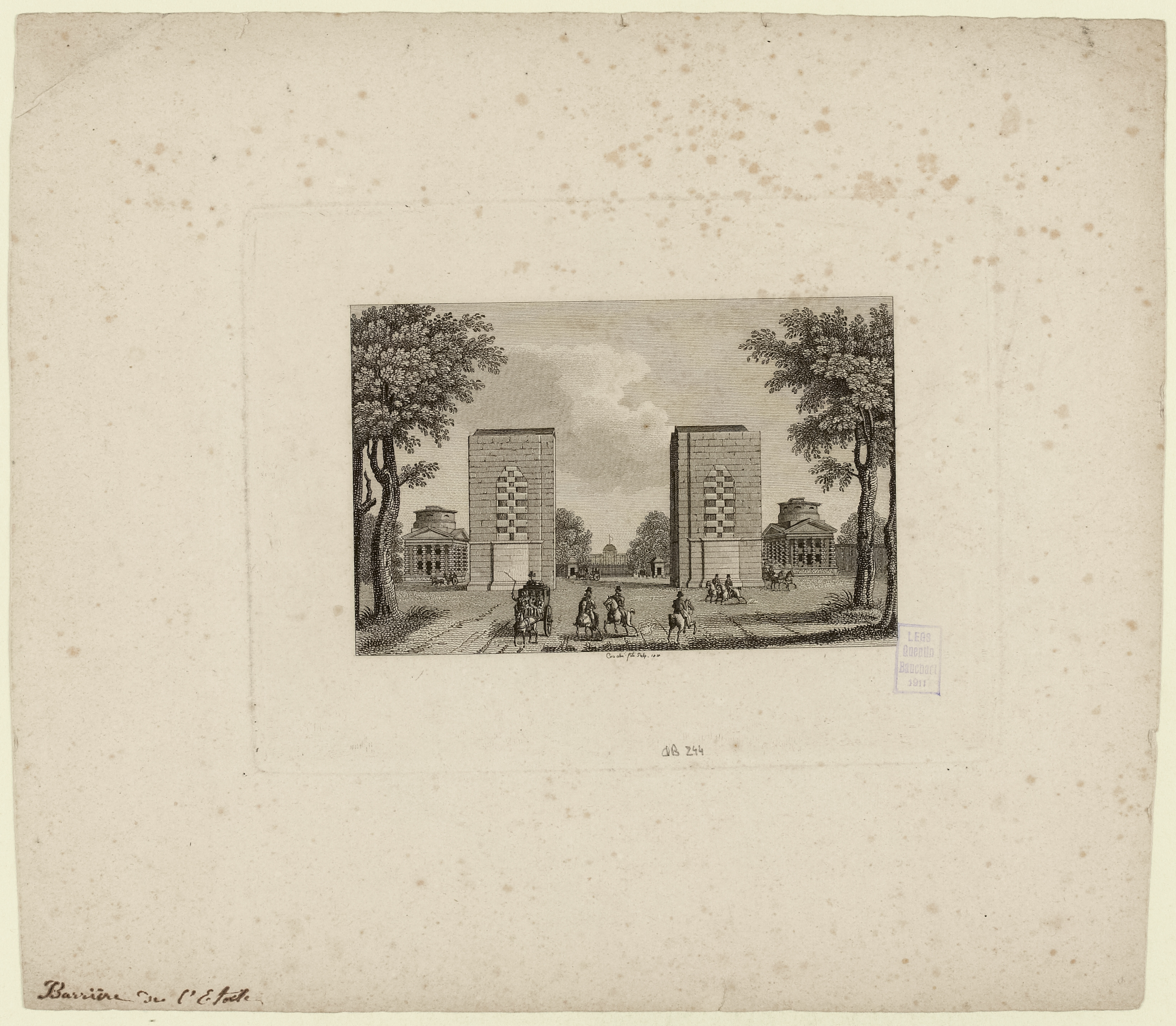
François Louis Couché, Barrière de l'Étoile, 1818

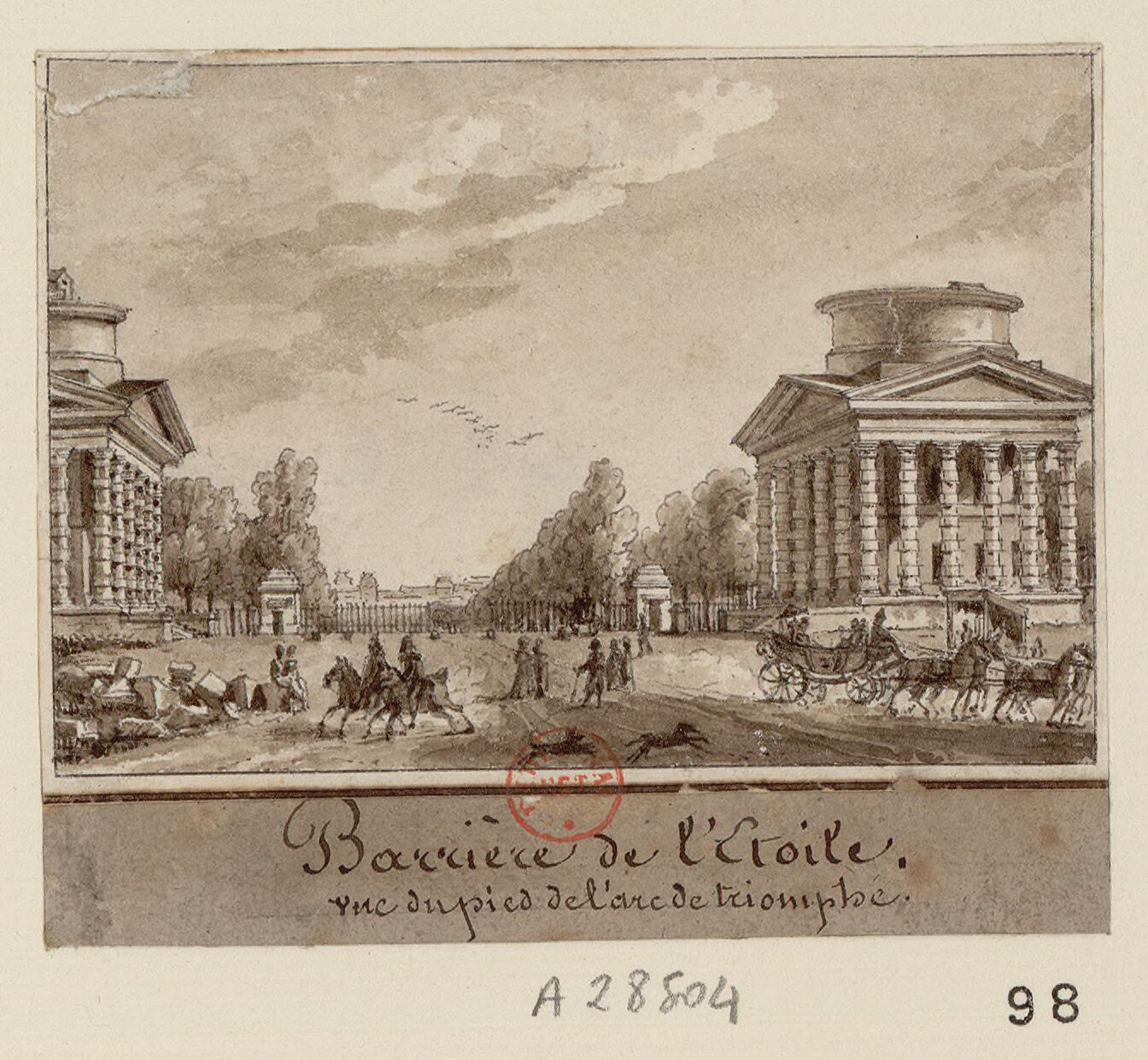
Christophe Civeton, Barrière de l'Ètoile vue du pied de l'arc de triomphe, 1829

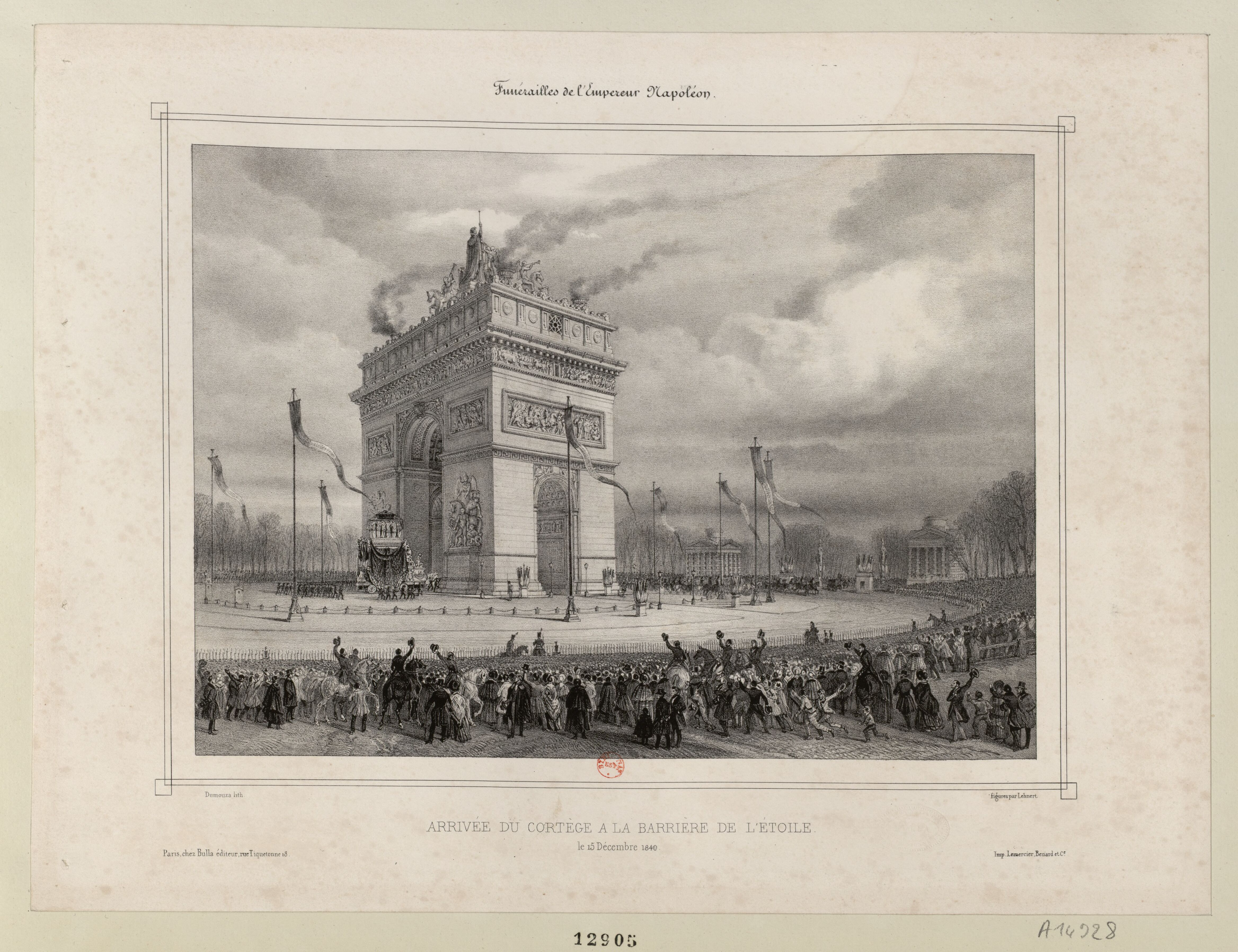
Paul Joseph Dumouza after Pierre Frédéric Lehnert, Funérailles de l’empereur Napoléon. Arrivée du cortège à la barrière de l’Étoile, 15 décembre 1840

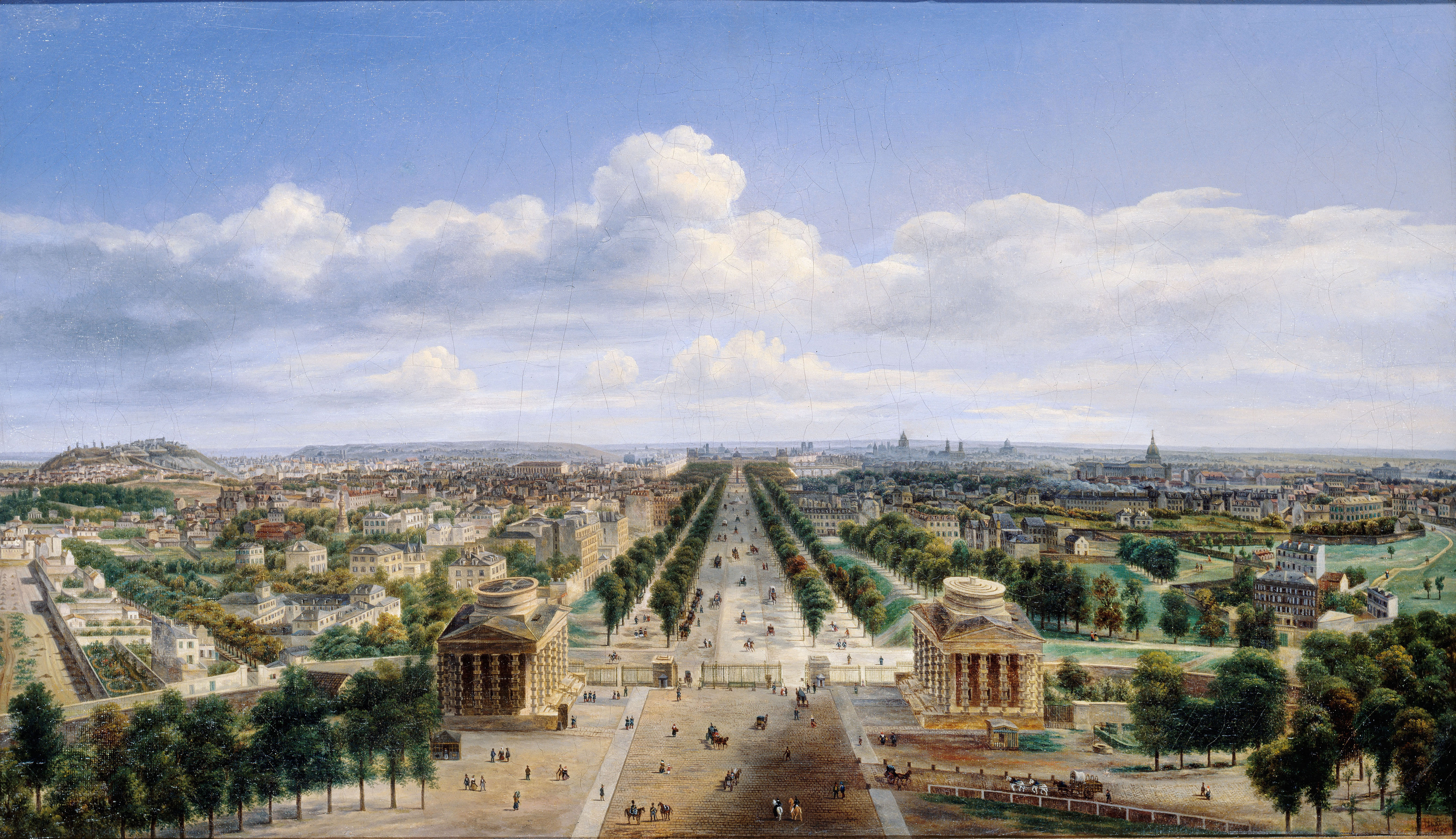
Auguste Cadolle, [Vue de Paris] 1843
