= William F. Garms =

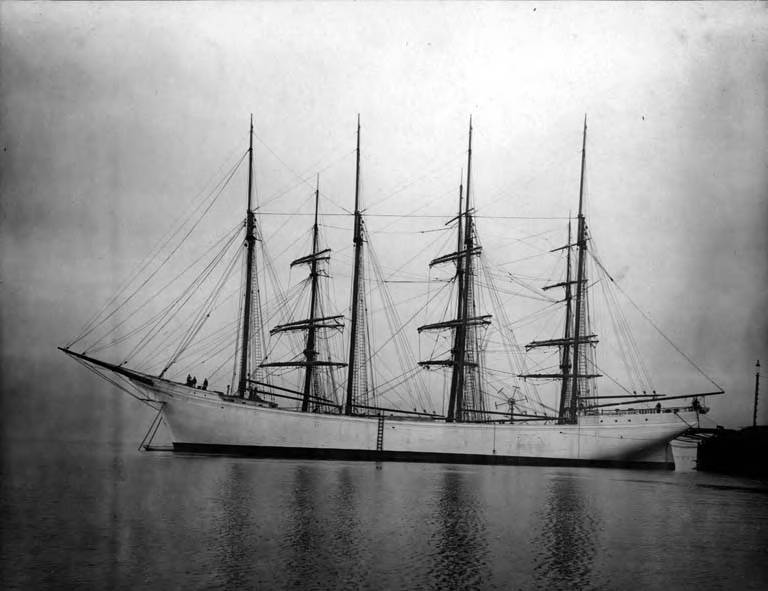
- William F. Garms at anchor, Washington, ca. 1900

History
- Name: William F. Garms
- Owner: Sanders & Kirchmann; Olson & Mahony, San Francisco; Rolph Navigation & Coal Co.; L. A. Scott of Mobile
- Builder: C. G. White
- Launched: 1901
- Renamed: Golden State (c. 1913)
- Fate: Lost by fire at sea on February 17, 1922

General characteristics
- Type: Four-masted sailing ship
- Tons burthen: 1,094 tons
- Length: 215.5 ft (65.7 m)
- Beam: 40.7 ft (12.4 m)
- Draught: 16 ft (4.9 m)

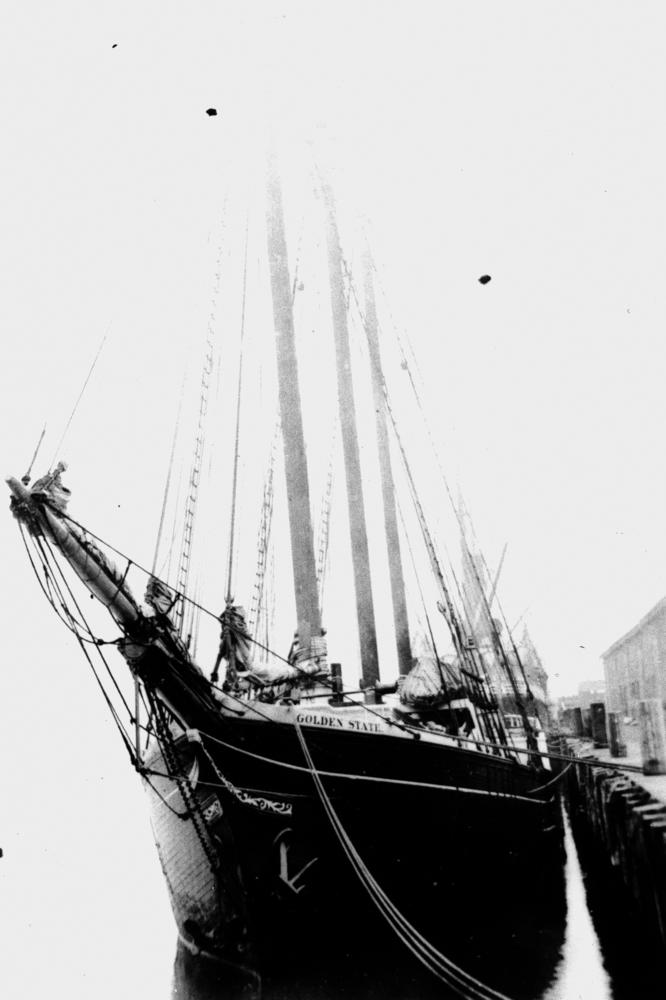
Golden State

William F. Garms was a four-masted schooner built in Everett, Washington, in 1901 by C. G. White. She was later renamed Golden State.

According to the notes written on the back of the ca. 1900 photo (click on the image to view the writing, purportedly from The H. W. McCurdy Marine History of the Pacific Northwest, Newell, Gordon, ed., Seattle: The Superior Company, 1966), she veered into the barkentine S. G. Wilder in 1913 as the two were being towed to sea for a race at Port Townsend, Washington. The ship was later dismasted in a storm in January 1914, with the crew taking to a lifeboat and being rescued by the Snohomish, according to the notes. Another source, however, states the dismasting occurred in December 1913. In either case, she was towed to Seattle and repaired by her owner Rolph Navigation & Coal Co., and renamed the Golden State.

The Golden State caught fire in the Atlantic Ocean off Pensacola, Florida, on February 17 or 18, 1922, and was abandoned. She was towed into Pensacola in a capsized state on February 23. She subsequently was righted, repaired, and returned to service.

According to the notes, "the Golden State was sold to L.A. Scott of Mobile". She was lost by fire at sea at 29° 29' N, 85° 50' W on February 17, 1922, the crew being rescued.
