= West Parish =

West Parish may refer to:

In the United Kingdom:

- Holburn West Parish Church, Aberdeen, Scotland

In the United States:

- West Baton Rouge Parish, Louisiana
- West Carroll Parish, Louisiana
- West Feliciana Parish, Louisiana
- West Parish Burying Ground, Massachusetts
- West Parish Elementary School Science Park, Massachusetts
- West Parish Center District, historic district in Massachusetts
