= Ferrini =

Ferrini is an Italian surname, and may refer to:

- Francesco Ferrini, Italian footballer (born 1985)
- Franco Ferrini, Italian screenwriter (born 1944)
- Giorgio Ferrini, Italian football manager (1939–1976)
- Henry Ferrini, American non-fiction filmmaker (born 1953)
- Vincent Ferrini, American writer and poet (1913–2007)
