= Luo Wen =

Luo Wen may refer to:

- Luo Wen (politician), Chinese executive and politician, secretary of the Hebei Provincial Committee of the Chinese Communist Party
- Wayne Lo (born 1974), Taiwanese-born American murderer
- Roman Tam (1945–2002), Chinese singer and Hong Kong pop music icon
