= Vincent Ferrini =

American writer and poet (1913–2007)

- Venanzio Ugo Ferrini
- Born: June 4, 1913; Saugus, Massachusetts, US
- Died: December 24, 2007 (aged 94); Rockport, Massachusetts, US
- Occupation: Poet

Venanzio Ugo "Vincent" Ferrini (June 24, 1913 – December 24, 2007) was an American writer and poet from Gloucester, Massachusetts.

== Early life ==
Vincent Ferrini was born in Saugus, Massachusetts on June 24, 1913. Vincent's parents, John and Rita Ferrini, were Christian anarchists who emigrated from Raiano and Bella, Italy in the region of Abruzzi to work in the shoe factories of Lynn, Massachusetts. Vincent's experience working in the shoe factories would instill a sensitivity for the life of the poor.

Ignoring his father's warning that the son of a shoe worker could never become a poet, Vincent published his first volume of poetry, "No Smoke" in 1940. He pursued his education in the Lynn Public Library and when the Great Depression hit, the young bard found work as a teacher in the WPA. In 1943, Mike Gold of the Daily Worker praised "Injunction", a collection of working class vignettes set against the backdrop of World War II. In 1942 he married and left his job at General Electric to make a living as a frame maker.

== Career ==
Vincent's move to Gloucester marked a shift in his poetry from the political and social to the personal and cosmic. Over the next 59 years, Gloucester became his place, where life and poetry combined.

In 1949, after seeing a poem in the magazine Imagi, Charles Olson paid Ferrini a visit that Olson would later characterize as a "fan call". Ferrini was the catalyst that brought together Olson and poet Robert Creeley. Later Olson addressed his first “Maximus Poems” as letters to Vincent.

Ferrini's first marriage ended in the 1960s after the death of his daughter. He later married the artist Mary Shore. When his second marriage ended in divorce he moved back to his frame shop at 126 East Main Street. The little shop became a nexus for many artists and writers who came to Gloucester.

Vincent's view of the individual, the family, the community, and the nation working together for the common good compelled him to write editorials and letters not only to local Gloucester papers but also to The Boston Globe, The New York Times, and The Nation. At Gloucester City Hall he voiced his concerns at hundreds of council meetings. His focus was always the preservation of his city from what he characterized as "the wildfire greed that will destroy the spirit and originality of his city."

Ferrini remained an academic outsider who never made a living solely from his writing. With vigor, creativity, and compassion he kept publishing for over 67 years, producing 31 volumes of poetry, four volumes of plays, and an autobiography. Vincent is the subject of his nephew Henry Ferrini's film Poem in Action. He was also interviewed briefly in Henry's film about Vincent's colleague Charles Olson entitled Polis is this.

== Bibliography ==
=== Poetry ===
- No Smoke, 1941 Falmouth Publishing House, Portland Maine
- No Smoke, available in braille, Injunction, 1943 Sand Piper Press, Lynn, Massachusetts
- Tidal Wave, 1945 Great Concord Publishers, New York, New York
- Blood of the Tenement, 1945 Sand Piper Press, Lynn, Massachusetts
- Plow in the Ruins, 1948 James Decker Press, Prairie City, Illinois
- Sea Sprung, 1949 Cape Ann Press, Gloucester, Massachusetts
- The Infinite People, 1950 Great Concord Publishers, New York, New Your
- The House of Time, 1952 Fortune Press, London, England
- In the Arriving, 1954 Heron Press, Liverpool England
- Mindscapes, 1955 Peter Pauper Press, Mt. Vernon, New York
- Timeo Hominem Unius Mulieris, 1956 Heron Press, Liverpool, England
- The Garden, 1958 Heuretic Press, Gloucester, Massachusetts
- The Square Root of In, 1959 Heuretic Press, Gloucester, Massachusetts
- Book of One, 1960 Heuretic Press, Gloucester, Massachusetts
- Mirandum, 1963 Heuretic Press, Gloucester, Massachusetts
- I Have the World, 1967 Fortune Press, London, England
- The Hiding One, 1973 Me and Thee Press, Brookline, Massachusetts
- Ten Pound Light, 1975 The Church Press, Gloucester, Massachusetts
- Selected Poems, 1976 University of Connecticut Library, Storrs, Connecticut
- Know Fish, Volumes I and II, 1979 University of Connecticut
- Know Fish, Volume III, The Navigators 1984 University of Connecticut
- Know Fish, Volumes IV and V, The Community of Self, 1986 University of Connecticut
- Know Fish, Volumes VI and VII, This Other Ocean, 1991 University of Connecticut
- A Tale of Psyche, 1991 Igneus Press, Bedford, New Hampshire
- Magdalene Silences, 1992 Igneus Press, Bedford, New Hampshire
- Deluxe Daring, 1994 Drawings by Jane Robbins and poetry of Vincent Ferrini, Bliss Publications, Boston, MA
- The Magi Image, 1995 Igneus Press, New Hampshire
- Preamble To Divinity, 1996 Published in cooperative venture by: JUXTA, Charlottesville, VA & 3300 Press, San Francisco CA

The singer and keyboard player Willie Alexander recorded a few Ferrini's poems under the title Vincent Ferrini's Greatest Hits (CD released by Fisheye Records, 2009).

=== Anthologies ===
- American Poets: 1880-1945, Dictionary of Literary Biography, Vol 48, 1986 Gale Research Company, Detroit, MI
- Italian American Poets, 1985 Italian translation: Ferdinand Alfonsi, A. Carello Editore, Catanzaro, Italia
- Poets of Today, Walter Lowenfels, 1964 International Publishers, NY, NY
- Twentieth Century American Poets, 1989 Russian translation: Valery Shpak, Ukraine, USSR

=== Plays ===
- The Innermost I land, Best Short Plays 1952–53, Dodd Mead & Company NY, NY
- Telling of the North Star Best Short Plays 1953–54, Dodd Mead & Company NY, NY
- Five Plays, 1960 Fortune Press, London, England
- War in Heaven, 1987 University of Connecticut Library, Storrs, CN
- Undersea Bread, 1989 University of Connecticut Library, Storrs, CN

=== Autobiography ===
- Hermit of the Clouds, 1988 Ten Pound Island Book Company, Gloucester, MA
- Hermit of the Clouds, 1990 Japanese translation: Shingo Tajima. Ten Pound Island Book Company, Gloucester, Massachusetts
