= Ravenswood Park =

Nature reserve in Massachusetts, United States

Coordinates: 42°35′40″N 70°41′43″W

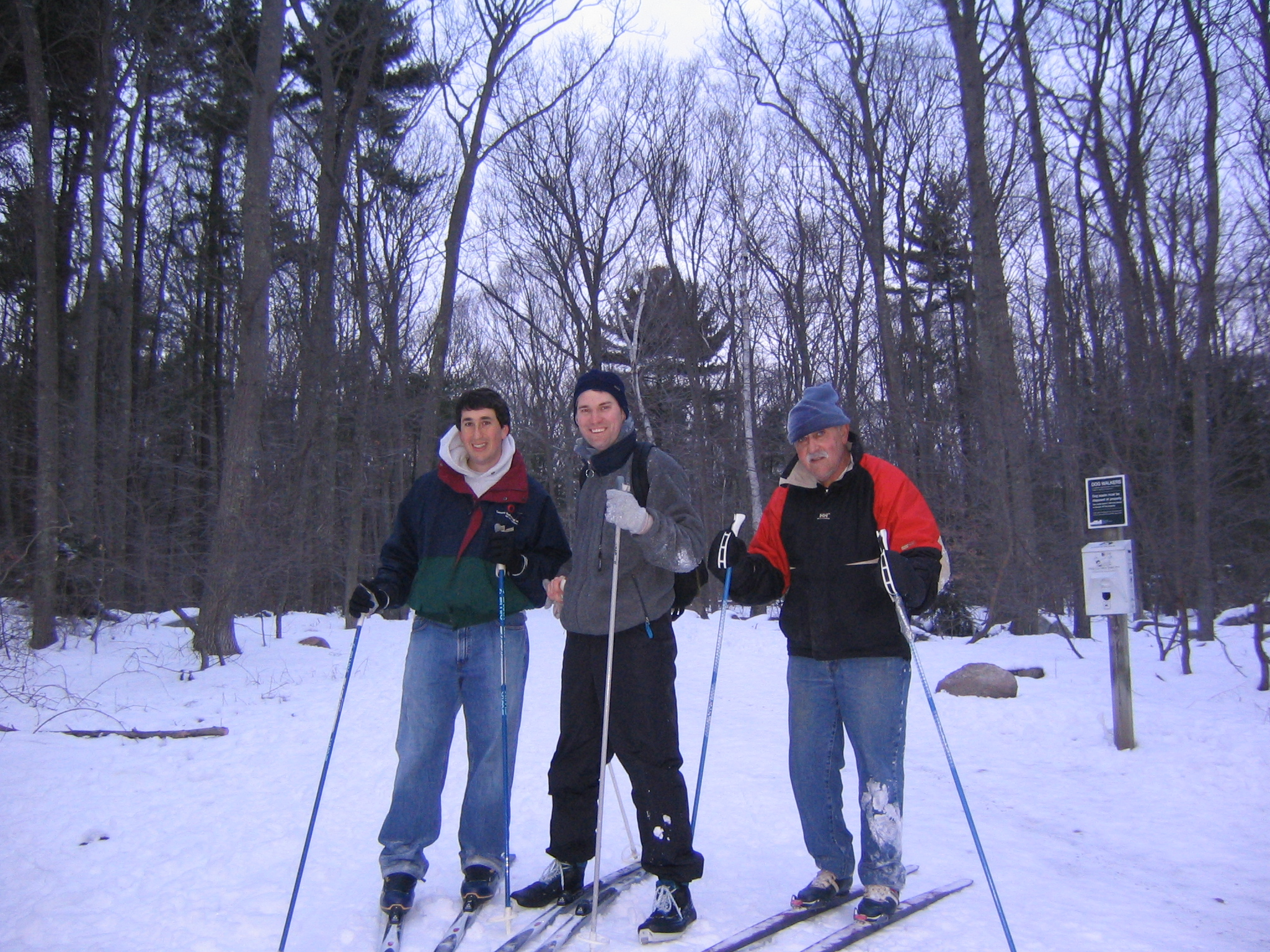
Three enthusiasts complete a day of cross-country skiing in Ravenswood Park in 2005.

Ravenswood Park is a nature reserve in the western section of Gloucester, Massachusetts owned and managed by the Trustees of Reservations, which acquired the property in 1993. It can be accessed from Western Avenue, the road to Manchester through the Magnolia area. Ravenswood Park is frequented by cross-country skiers during the winter.

== The Hermit of Gloucester ==
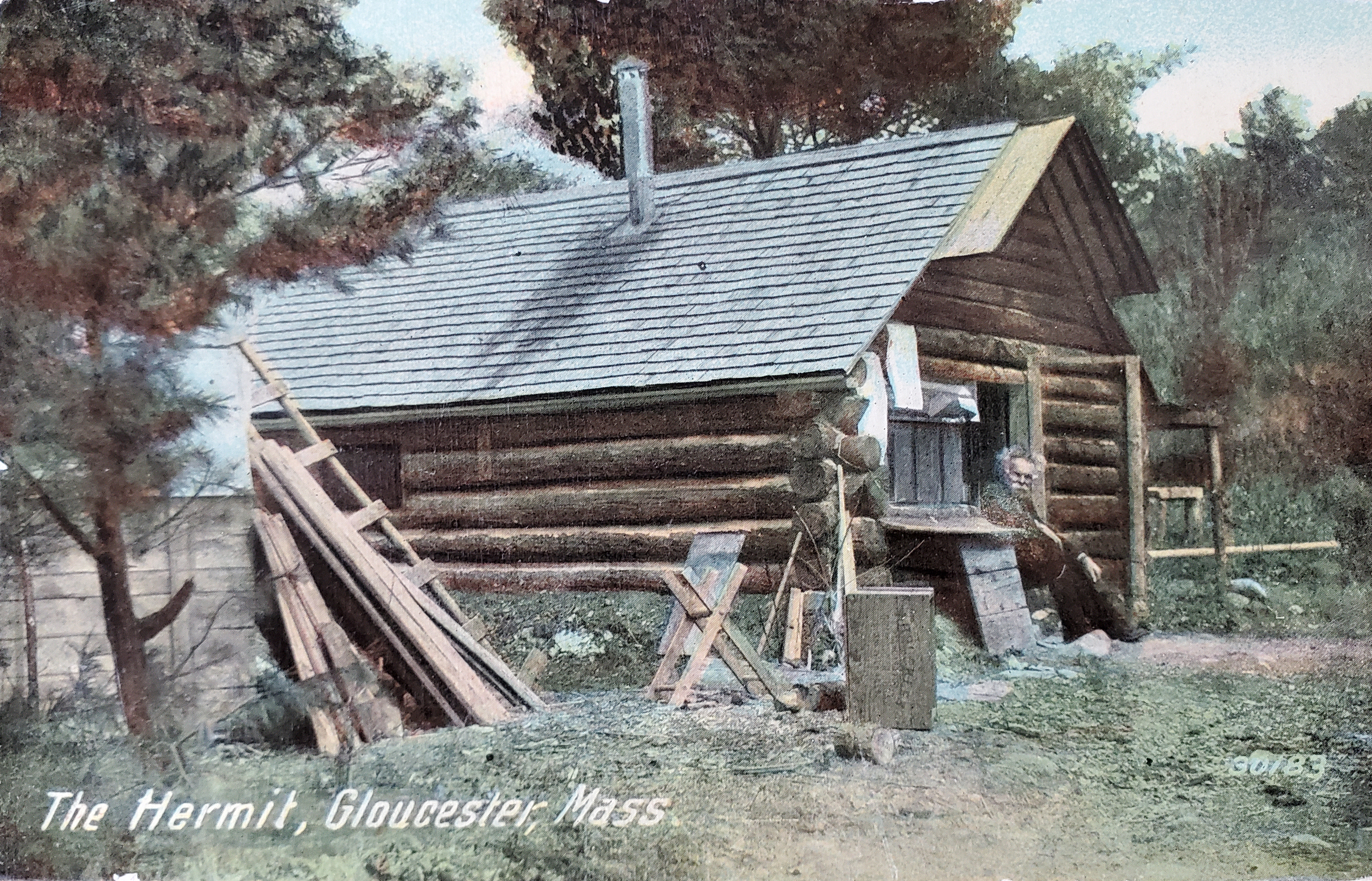

Mason A. Walton lived for 33 years in a house he built in the woods in 1884. He came to be known as "The Hermit of Gloucester." He published a book, A Hermit's Wild Friends. A plaque attached to a boulder marks the site of the cabin.
