= 1992 Bard College at Simon's Rock shooting =

Mass shooting in Great Barrington, Massachusetts

- Bard College at Simon's Rock (Massachusetts) Bard College at Simon's Rock (the United States)
- Location: 42.209°N 73.38°W; Great Barrington, Massachusetts, U.S.
- Date: December 14, 1992 c. 10:20 p.m.
- Target: Students and faculty of Bard College at Simon's Rock
- Attack type: Mass shooting, school shooting
- Weapon: SKS semi-automatic rifle
- Deaths: 2
- Injuries: 4
- Perpetrator: Wayne Lo

On December 14, 1992, a mass shooting occurred at Bard College at Simon's Rock in Great Barrington, Massachusetts, United States. A student and a professor were killed, and four others were injured, before the gunman, 18-year-old Wayne Lo, surrendered to police. He is currently serving two life sentences plus 20 years.

== Events ==
=== Prior to the shooting ===
On the morning of December 14, 1992, Simon's Rock receptionist Teresa Beavers searched a package addressed to Wayne Lo from the North Carolina company Classic Arms and found 7.62 caliber ammunition inside the package. She notified college residence directors and called for an investigation of Lo's dormitory. Residence director Katherine Robinson went to Lo's dormitory and asked Lo if she could see the contents of the package. Lo refused, and Robinson informed the associate dean of students. Robinson returned to Lo's dormitory with her husband and searched his room but found no weapons or ammunition. Lo told them the ammunition was a Christmas gift for his father; Lo was sent to the dean's office, and later the dean dismissed him, suspecting he was not possessing any weapons on the school campus. Reports were inconsistent, as other students had made complaints about Lo stockpiling ammunition in his dormitory. Chris Lucht, associate dean, had allegedly refused to investigate.

That night, an anonymous person phoned school officials, claiming that Lo was armed with weapons and was going to kill members of the Robinson family. The caller identified himself as another student with whom Lo had dinner that night. The Robinsons contacted the college provost, Ba Win, and went with their children to stay at Win's home in Lee, Massachusetts. There they called the dean to locate Lo; no precaution was taken, however, and the police were never notified. Lo was hiding the ammunition which he had ordered two days earlier.

=== Shooting ===
On December 14, at around 10:00 a.m. Lo travelled by taxi to Pittsfield, Massachusetts, and purchased a SKS semi-automatic rifle at Dave's Sporting Goods store. At about 9:20 PM, an acquaintance of Lo named Shubaly passed Lo in the hall of the Crosby House dormitory about 9:20 p.m. He noticed that his head was shaved. Shubaly noted that he saw Lo heading up the stairs in which he said to Lo "Hey man, what’s up?" The shooting began at approximately 10:20 p.m. in the school security area. He shot Theresa Beavers twice in the abdomen, and later fatally shot a Spanish language professor Ñacuñán Sáez in the side of his head while he was driving his Ford Festiva. Lo then fatally shot student Galen Gibson who had left the library to assist whoever had crashed their car, unaware that there was a gunman on campus. Gibson was struck twice, with the chest shot being mortal, and then he went back into the library and died. Lo also wounded another student. Afterward, Lo walked towards a dormitory where he wounded two freshmen students. Lo's rifle jammed after firing at least nine bullets during the entire attack and he dropped his weapon before walking to the student union building and phoned police to tell them of his actions. Lo surrendered to police without further incident.

=== Victims ===
Those killed in the shooting were student Galen Gibson, 18, and professor Ñacuñán Sáez, 37. Gibson was a poetry major from Gloucester, Massachusetts, while Sáez was an Argentine-born Spanish professor. Those wounded were the security guard Theresa Beavers, 42, and students Thomas McElderry, 19, Joshua A. Faber, 17, and Matthew Lee David, 18. McElderry was shot once, and the round broke his right femur. Faber was shot through both thighs and his left calf.

== Perpetrator ==
Wayne Lo
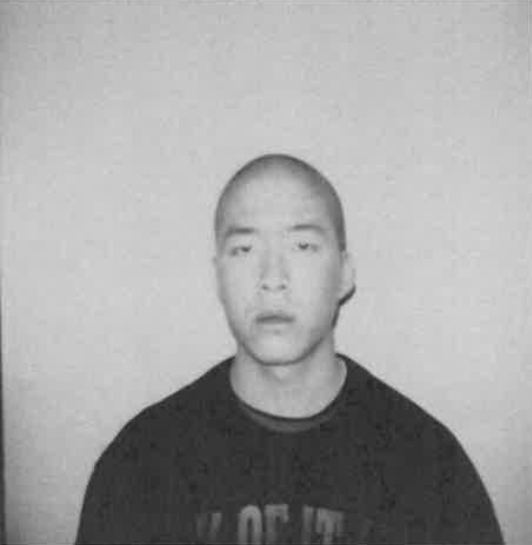
- Great Barrington Police Department's intake photo of Wayne Lo
- Born: November 14, 1974 (age 51); Tainan, Taiwan
- Convictions: First degree murder (2 counts); Attempted murder (6 counts); Assault (7 counts)
- Penalty: Life imprisonment plus 20 years

Details
- Killed: 2
- Injured: 4

Wayne Lo (Luo Wen) (Chinese: 駱文) was born in Tainan, Taiwan, to Chia Wei Lo, a fighter pilot, and Lin Lin Lo, a violin teacher, both Mainland Chinese immigrants to Taiwan. The Lo family moved to the United States in spring 1981, living in a suburban neighborhood in Rockville, Maryland, while Chia Wei Lo was assigned to a diplomatic post in Washington, D.C. While living in Maryland, the 7-year-old Lo became a violinist with the Montgomery County Youth Orchestra.

His family returned to Taiwan in 1983, after Chia-Wei relinquished his position that year. The family later settled in northwest Billings, Montana, in summer 1987. His parents later managed the Great Wall Chinese restaurant at Grand Avenue in Billings. He attended Lewis & Clark Junior High School in Billings for seventh to eighth grade, before attending Billings Central Catholic High School for his freshman and sophomore year. Lo was a violinist in the Billings Symphony Orchestra beginning at age fourteen. He attended the Aspen Music Festival in 1990 and studied under the prominent violin teacher Dorothy DeLay. Lo had a GPA of 3.56 in his sophomore year.

In April 1991, Lo was accepted by Simon's Rock College of Bard in Great Barrington, Massachusetts, and given the W.E.B. Du Bois minority scholarship, beginning fall classes that September. He had wanted to attend a boarding school to estrange himself from his father. While attending Simon's Rock, Lo expressed racist and fascist beliefs. He wrote an essay arguing for segregation of homosexuals to prevent the spread of AIDS, and denied the existence of the Holocaust. Other students reported being uncomfortable with his expression of these beliefs.

== Trial, conviction, and incarceration ==
Lo's month-long trial took place at the Hampden County Superior Court in Springfield, Massachusetts (it was moved from Berkshire county to adjoining Hampden county at the request of the defense lawyers, in order to avoid jury bias). Although claims were made by the media prior to the trial regarding Lo's supposed racist beliefs, he was never charged with a hate crime, and the racism accusations were never substantiated. Instead, the focus turned to his mental state at the time of the shooting as Lo made an insanity plea. His psychiatrists testified that he was suffering from paranoid schizophrenia, while a court-appointed psychiatrist attributed Lo's actions merely to Narcissistic Personality Disorder.

On February 3, 1994, Lo was found guilty on all 17 charges against him and sentenced to two consecutive life sentences without possibility of parole. In 2024, the Massachusetts Supreme Judicial Court banned life without parole sentences for crimes committed by offenders under the age of 21. However, Lo waived his right to a resentencing hearing, stating in an affidavit that he believed his original sentence was "fair and proportional to the horrific crimes I committed." He listed the names of all of the people whom he'd shot, both fatally and non-fatally.

Lo spent nine months at a maximum security facility at Walpole, Massachusetts, from February to November 1994. He was later transferred to MCI-Norfolk, a medium security prison in Norfolk, Massachusetts.

== Aftermath ==
In 1999, Gregory Gibson, the father of victim Galen Gibson, wrote Gone Boy: A Walkabout, a detailed book recounting the shooting. The book spurred correspondence between Gibson and Lo, which was detailed in a New York Times article, as well as a German TV documentary film. In a February 2013 episode of PBS's Need to Know, journalist Maria Hinojosa reported,

"In fact, in an interview with Newsweek in 2007 after 32 people were killed in the Virginia Tech shootings ... Wayne Lo said: 'The fact that I was able to buy a rifle in 15 minutes, that's absurd. I was 18. I couldn't have rented a car to drive home from school, yet I could purchase a rifle. Obviously a waiting period would be great. Personally, I only had five days left of school before winter break ... If I had a two-week waiting period for the gun, I wouldn't have done it.'"

In December 2017, Lo was interviewed by Gibson. In the video, Lo explains how easy it is to legally obtain a semi-automatic rifle in the United States.

Lo wore a sweatshirt with the name of the New York City hardcore punk band Sick of It All during the shooting. This spurred the band to issue press releases denouncing Lo's crimes. The journalist Chuck Klosterman wrote a passage in his book, Killing Yourself to Live, in which Wayne Lo writes Klosterman a letter from prison contemplating what questions might have been raised if Lo were arrested wearing a T-shirt with the bands Poison or Warrant instead of Sick of It All.

Jonathan Fast’s detailing of the shooting in Ceremonial Violence: A Psychological Explanation of School Shootings led to Gibson publishing an article regarding allegations of plagiarized passages taken directly from Gone Boy: A Walkabout.

Through an intermediary, Lo sold art he made in prison, donating proceeds to The Galen Gibson Fund.

Lo was an inspiration for the 2019 feature film Cuck by director Rob Lambert. Lambert rode the school bus with Lo while they both lived in Billings, Montana.

== See also ==
- List of school shootings in the United States by death toll
