= Sargent House Museum =

Coordinates: 42°36′45.5292″N 70°39′54.126″W

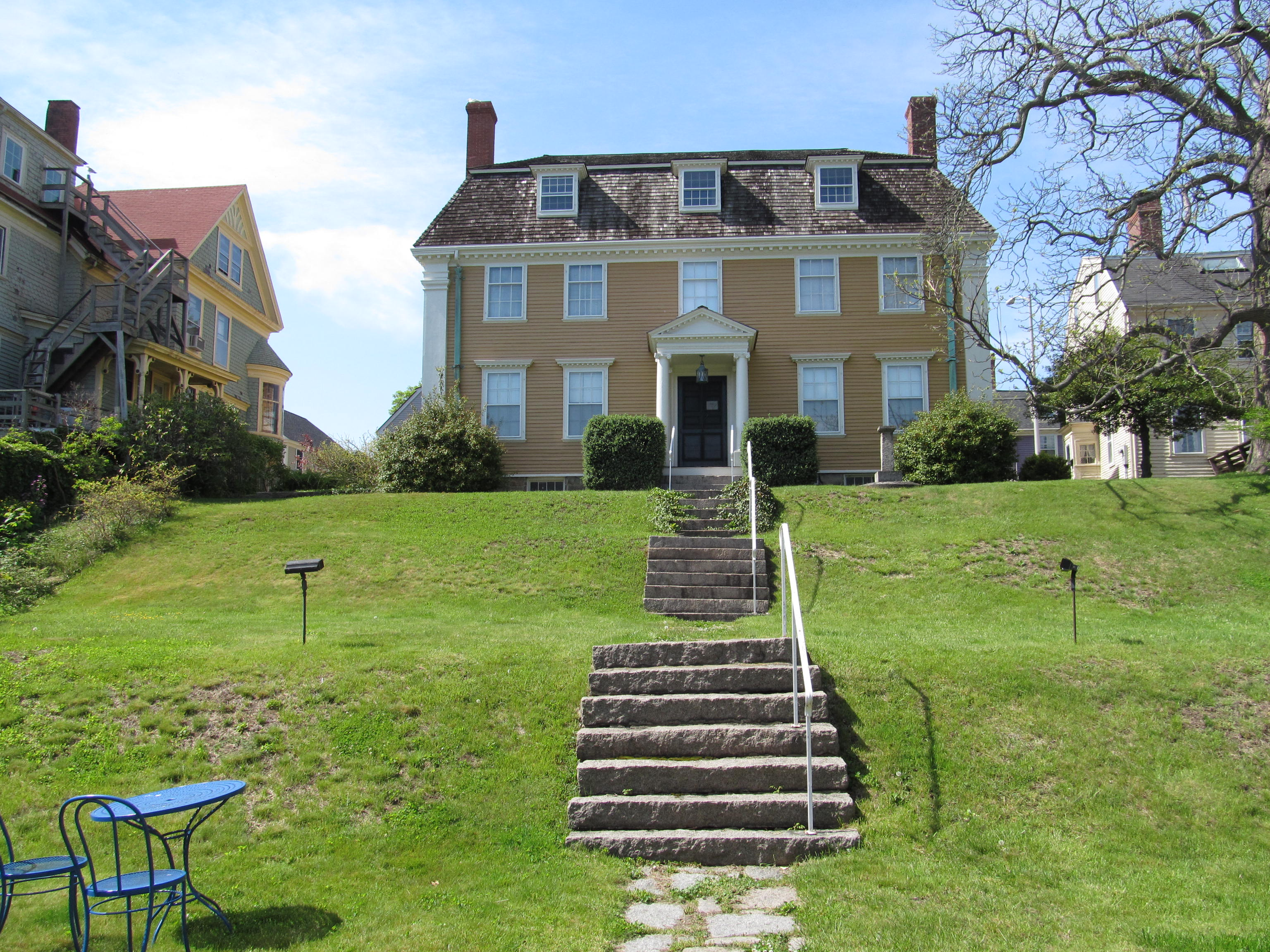
Sargent House Museum

The Sargent House Museum is a historic house museum located at 49 Middle Street, Gloucester, Massachusetts. The museum is open on weekends from Memorial Day to Columbus Day, and offers guided tours of the historic home, a small gift shop, and rotating exhibits in its exhibit space.

The Sargent House was built in 1782 for the feminist writer and philosopher Judith Sargent Murray and her first husband, John Stevens, a merchant in the West Indies trade. Judith's second husband, John Murray, the founder of the first Universalist Church in America, also lived in the house.

The home is considered high Georgian because of its symmetrical floor plan, and includes Georgian details in its quoins, windows, cornices, and columns. The central stairway is an unusually fine example of the skill of 18th-century woodworkers. It has an undercut spiral newel, two types of spiral balusters on each step, and a long arched window enclosed by Ionic columns at the landing. This stair was almost purchased by the MET Museum in NY around 1915 for installation in one of their "period rooms." This spurred the former families and friends of the House to preserve it as a museum.

The museum houses a small but exquisite collection of American decorative arts and furniture. It displays sculpture by Hiram Powers and one of the finest collections of family portraits in the United States by major American artists like Christian Gullager, Thomas Sully, James Frothingham, and Alvan Fisher. It has landscape prints and a painting by Fitz Henry Lane. The museum owns several Thomas Sheraton pieces of furniture, as well as furniture made in major American furniture centers like Boston, Salem, Newburyport and New Orleans. Artifacts from the life of Judith Sargent Murray such as her dictionary and first edition "The Gleaner" (1798) are also exhibited.

The house has a collection of original works by the painter John Singer Sargent, a descendant of the Sargent family.

== See also ==
- List of historic houses in Massachusetts
