= Jonathan Bayliss =

American novelist and playwright

Jonathan Bayliss (September 7, 1926 in Arlington, Massachusetts – April 15, 2009 in Gloucester, Massachusetts) was an American novelist and playwright who lived and wrote in Gloucester, Massachusetts. He was a close friend of poet Charles Olson after Olson's return to Gloucester in the late 1950s. Correspondence between Bayliss and Olson from 1958 to January 1970 was published by the Cape Ann Museum. Bayliss's highly innovative and polymathic novels employ a vast vocabulary, contain mathematical and philosophical puzzles, and avoid pop culture references in favor of historical and mythological allusions. He wrote two plays loosely based on the Sumerian Gilgamesh epic, The Tower of Gilgamesh and The Acts of Gilgamesh.

== Gloucesterman ==
Bayliss's Gloucesterman fiction tetralogy explores the concepts of mythology and ritual throughout history; the value of collective human endeavor to society; the tension between the mysteries of art and science; and the degradation of culture through economic exploitation. The novel Gloucesterbook and its sequel Gloucestertide create a fiction-world out of Gloucester similar to the Wessex of Thomas Hardy. The introductory volume Prologos was published in 1999. The final volume of the tetralogy, Gloucestermas, was published in 2010.

== Works ==
- Gloucesterbook (Protean Press, Rockport MA 1992)
- Gloucestertide (Protean Press, Rockport MA 1996)
- Prologos (Basilicum Press, Ashburnham MA 1999)
- Gloucestermas (Fontis Press, Westborough, MA 2010)
- Democratic Oak Tree (Drawbridge Press, Gloucester, MA 2016)
- Gilgamesh Plays (Drawbridge Press, Gloucester, MA 2017)
