= Gregory Gibson =

American author (born 1945)

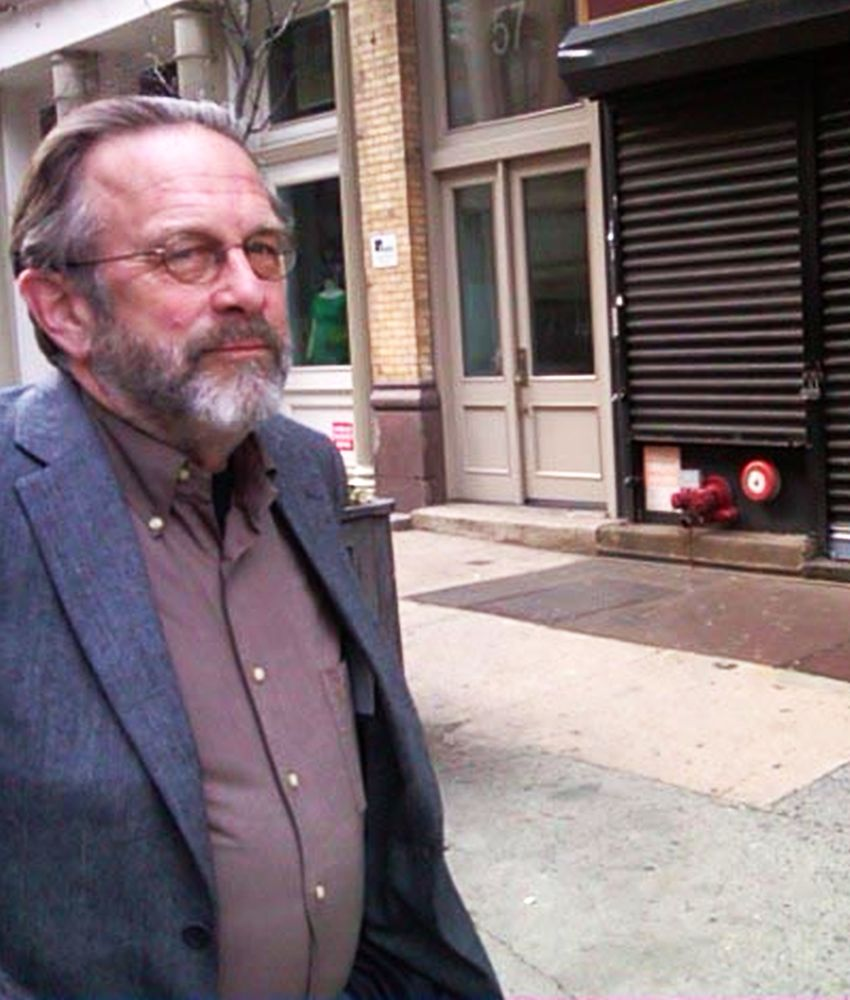
- Gregory Gibson, Spring 1998, photo by John Schulman
- Born: Gregory Arthur Gibson; July 10, 1945 (age 81); Athol, Massachusetts, United States
- Education: Swarthmore College, BA, 1967
- Occupation: Writer
- Known for: Gone Boy: A Walkabout; Demon of the Waters; Hubert's Freaks; The Old Turk's Load
- Spouse: Anne Marie Crotty (m. 1974)

Gregory Gibson (born July 10, 1945, in Athol, Massachusetts) is an American author.

Gibson is the author of Gone Boy: A Walkabout (Kodansha, 1999), Demon of the Waters (Little, Brown, 2004), Hubert's Freaks (Harcourt, 2008). The Old Turk's Load (Mysterious Press, 2013), and Mooney’s Manifesto (Spuyten Duyvil Publishing, 2023)"

After receiving his BA from Swarthmore College in 1967, Gibson enlisted in the United States Navy and worked as a shipfitter until 1971. After his discharge he moved to Gloucester, Massachusetts and was variously employed as a house painter, cab driver, and construction worker. In 1974 he married Anne Marie Crotty, and in 1976 he opened Ten Pound Island Book Company, and began his career as an antiquarian book dealer.

In 1992 their oldest son Galen was murdered, the random victim of a school shooting by a disturbed fellow student at Simon's Rock College in Great Barrington, Massachusetts. The shock of this event caused Gibson to write a memoir about his investigation of how such a thing could have happened. The book, Gone Boy, met with critical success, and was Entertainment Weekly’s “Best Book of the Year” for 1999. This was followed in 2002 by Demon of the Waters: The True Story of the Mutiny of the Whaleship Globe, which The New York Times deemed “a worthy contribution to the literature of whaling.” Gibson's third non-fiction book, Hubert's Freaks (2008), traces the career of a gifted but troubled individual who discovers a trove of hitherto unknown photographs by the great American photographer Diane Arbus. Larry McMurtry said of the book, “Hubert's Freaks will fascinate those among us who are continually stimulated by the richness and variety of American subcultures. I devoured it.” In 2013 Gibson's first crime novel, The Old Turk's Load, was published. The book was named a Deadly Pleasures “Best First Novel” and Booklist's “Best Crime Fiction Debut of the Year.” Elmore Leonard said, “I like Gibson’s writing, the effortless way he tells his story.” In 2023, American critic Kenneth Turan deemed Mooney’s Manifesto “a savage and anguished cry from the black heart of despair at the dead center of the crisis of gun violence in America.”

Beginning with “Our Violent Inner Landscape” (New York Times, April 23, 1999) Gibson has published opinion pieces such as “Message from a Club No One Wants to Join” (New York Times, February 17, 2018) or the long-form essay, also for the New York Times (June 1, 2019), “A Gun Killed My Son. So Why Do I Want to Own One?” These bear witness to the plague of gun violence sweeping America, from a survivor's point of view.

In 1998 the Crotty/Gibson family founded the Galen Gibson Scholarship Trust, AKA, “The Galen Fund.” According to its website, “The Galen Gibson Fund is a state and federally registered non-profit organization. It is privately endowed and continues to be supported by private and public donations. Since its establishment in 1998 the fund has contributed to local educational initiatives, to community and faith-based groups that work with victims of gun violence, and to organizations that promote commonsense gun laws. Donations in any amount are welcome and are tax-deductible.” Recently the Galen Fund has partnered with major Massachusetts Gun Violence Prevention groups including The Louis D. Brown Peace Institute, Live for Liv, and the Massachusetts Coalition to Prevent Gun Violence.

In 2014 Gibson began volunteering for the newly-formed Everytown for Gun Safety, working with survivors of gun violence, and as an advocate for gun sense legislation. He is available as a speaker on issues relating to gun violence, and has made frequent media appearances.

Gibson's fiction and non-fiction pieces specialize in the close examination of various American subcultures, from gun collectors to whaleship crewmen to freak show performers, usually as seen through the eyes of a single, strongly-delineated character. His approach combines unflinching realism with dark, dry humor. His advocacy writing is informed by his experiences as a licensed gun owner and as a survivor of gun violence.

He lives in Gloucester, Massachusetts with his wife, Anne Marie Crotty.
