= Alfred J. Wiggin =

American painter

Alfred James Wiggin or A. J. Wiggin (1823–1883) was an American artist active in Massachusetts, known mainly for his painted portraits and landscapes. He lived in Gloucester and Boston.

== Work ==
Examples of his work are in the collections of the Cape Ann Museum; Historic New England; Lafayette College; the Peabody Essex Museum; and the Sandy Bay Historical Society.

Wiggin worked as a commissioned artist, providing artistic services to clients across Massachusetts. As a result, he produced many portraits – the exact number of which is undetermined. He also produced landscapes on commission, such as an 1859 oil color of a house in nearby Annisquam for Captain Oliver Lane, a homesick sailor.

Wiggin produced portraits of several significant American figures of the mid 19th century. He painted Zachary Taylor in July 1851, a year after the president's death. In 1869, he produced a portrait of General Benjamin Butler, who was then a member of the House of Representatives for Wiggin's local district.

== Gallery ==
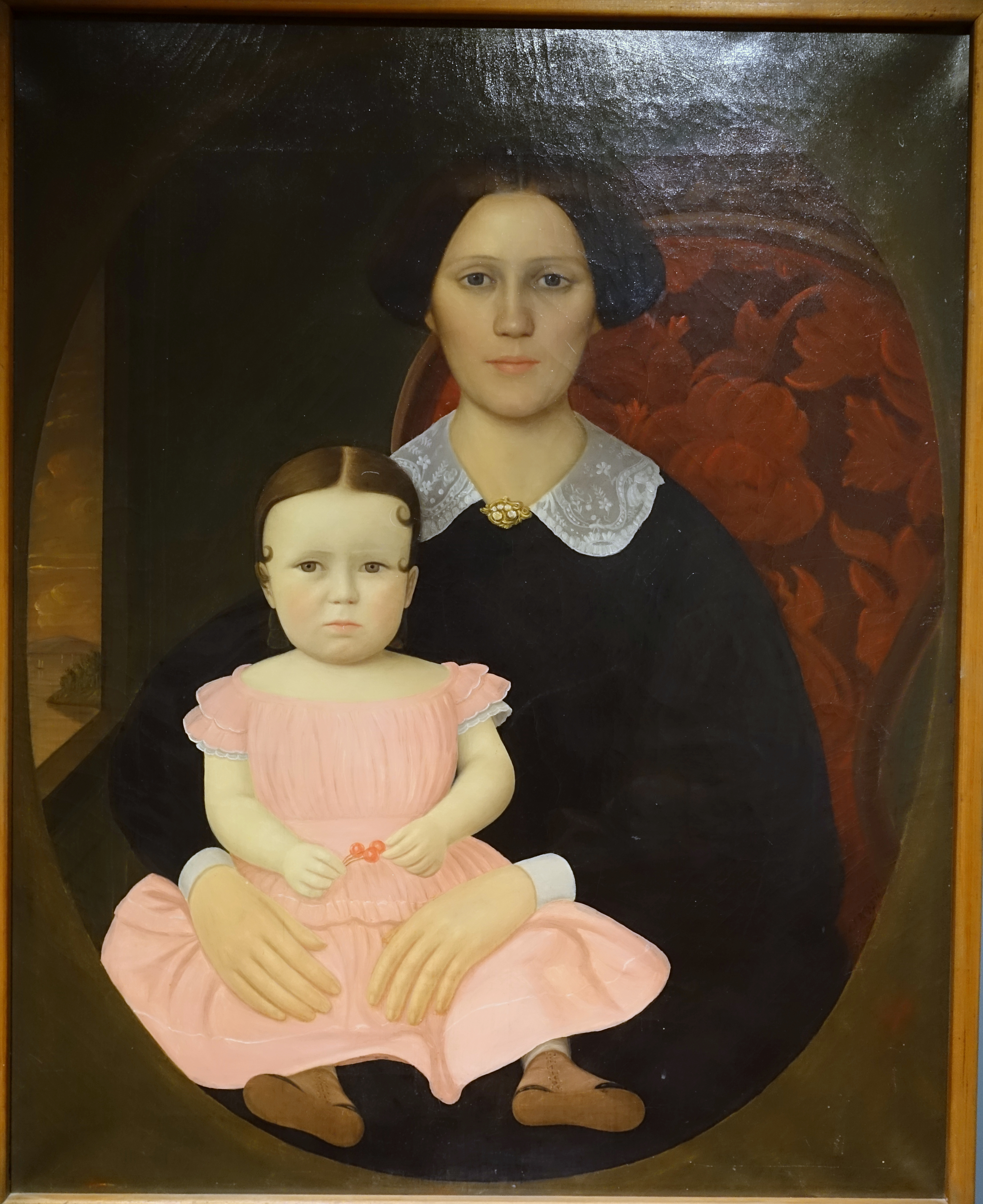
Eliza Dennison Wiggin and Child, 1836, oil on canvas - Cape Ann Museum - Gloucester, MA

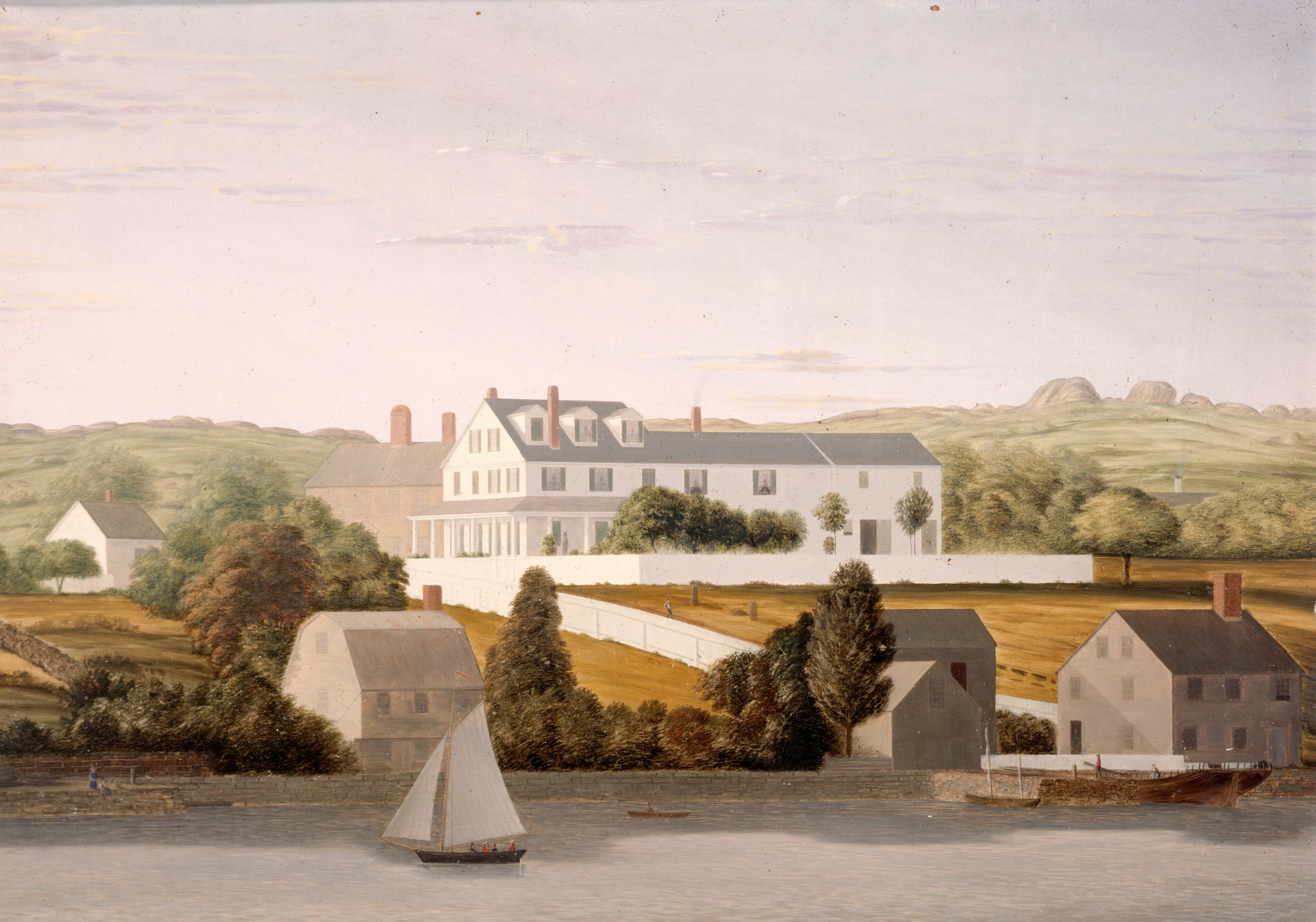
Captain Oliver Lane House, 1859 - Annisquam, MA

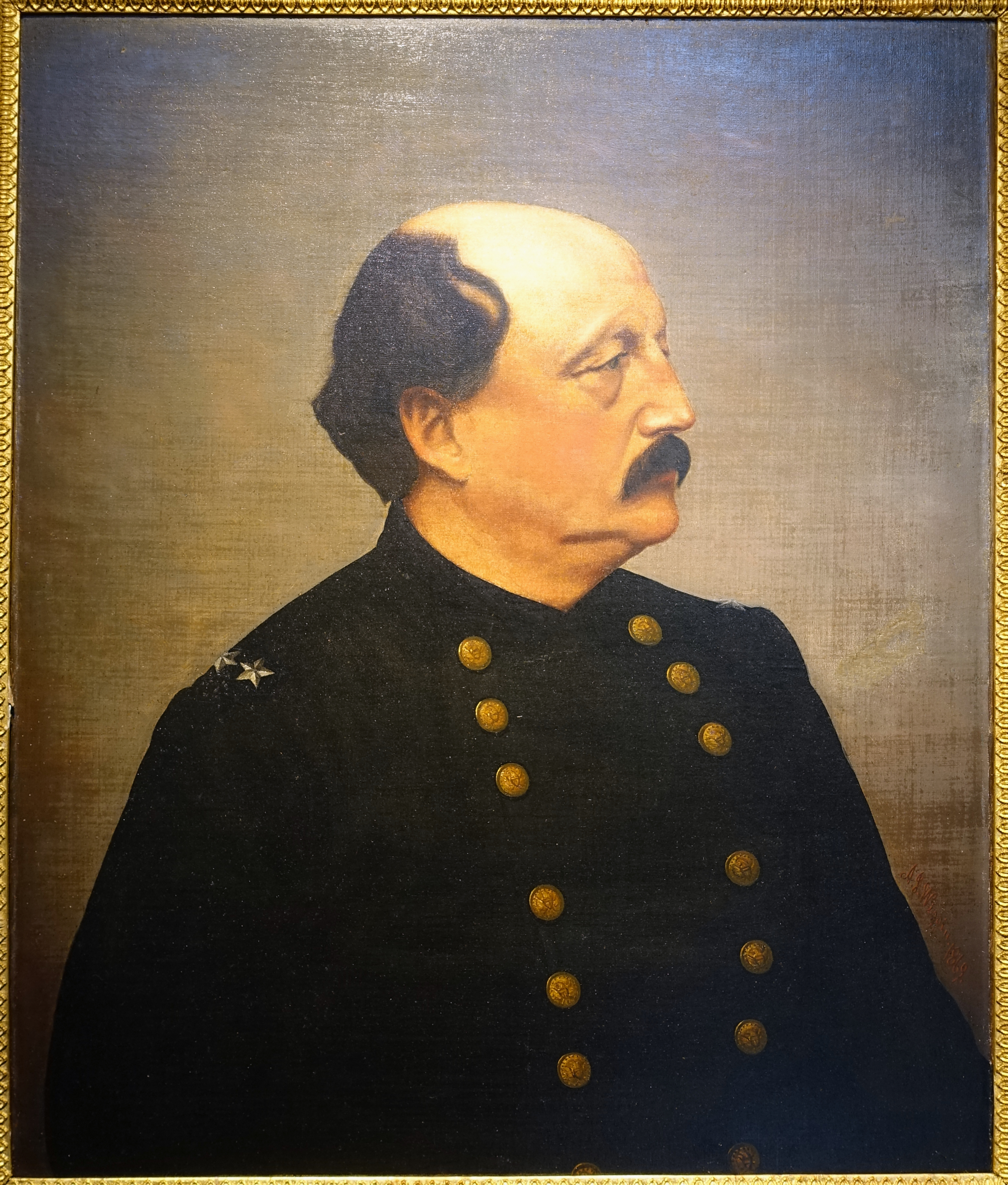
General Benjamin Butler, 1869, oil on canvas - Cape Ann Museum - Gloucester, MA
