= Gloucester, Massachusetts =

Gloucester
- City
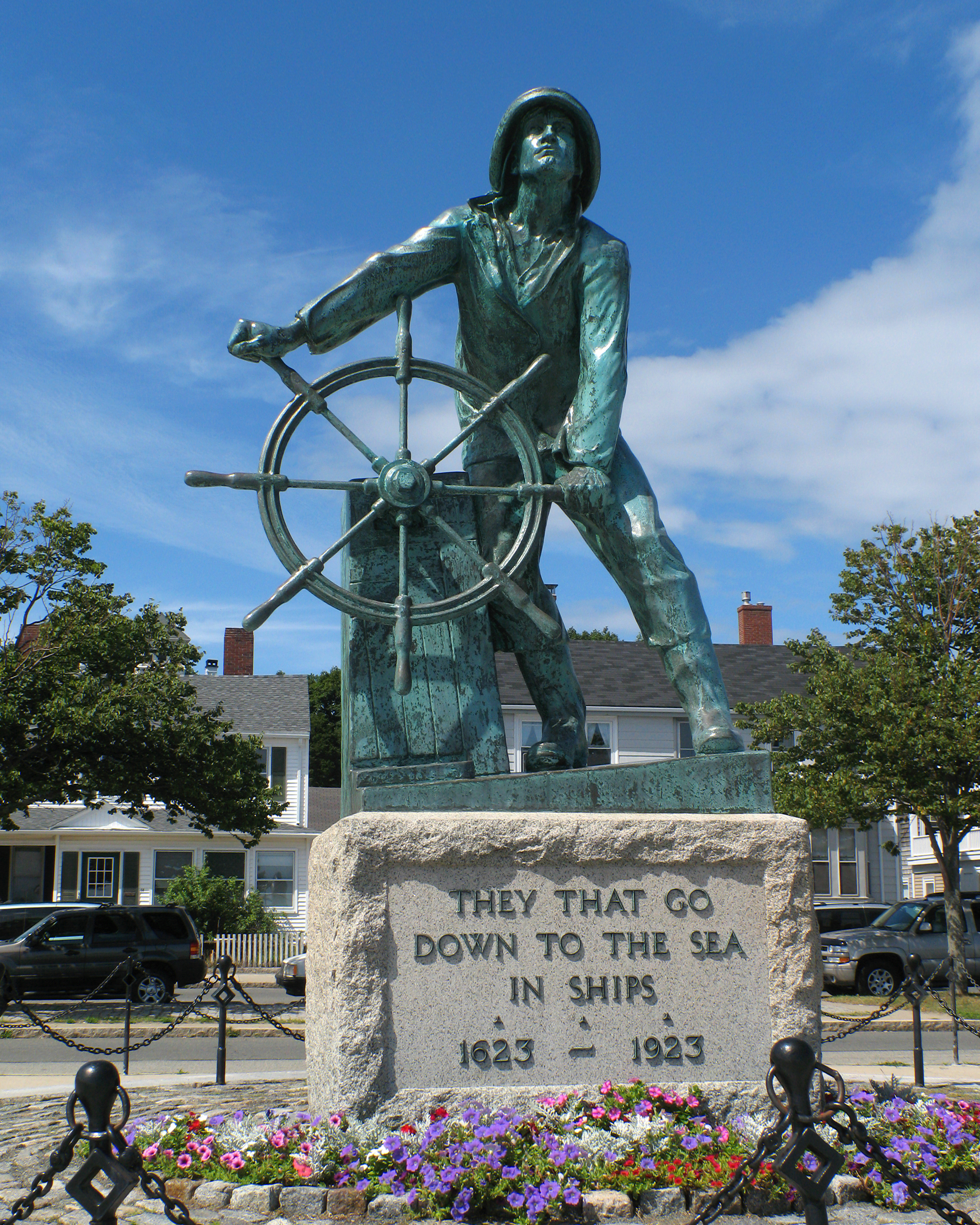
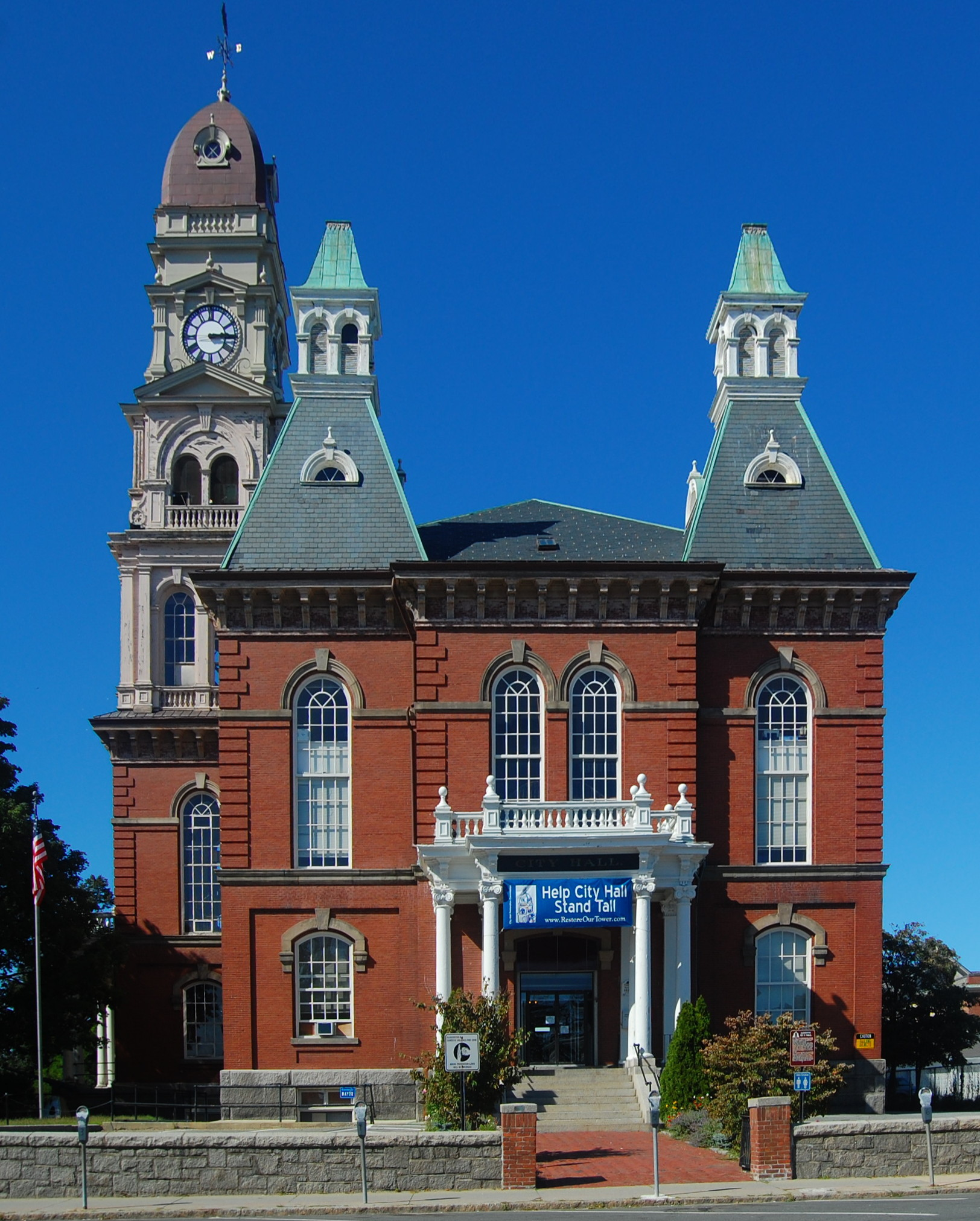
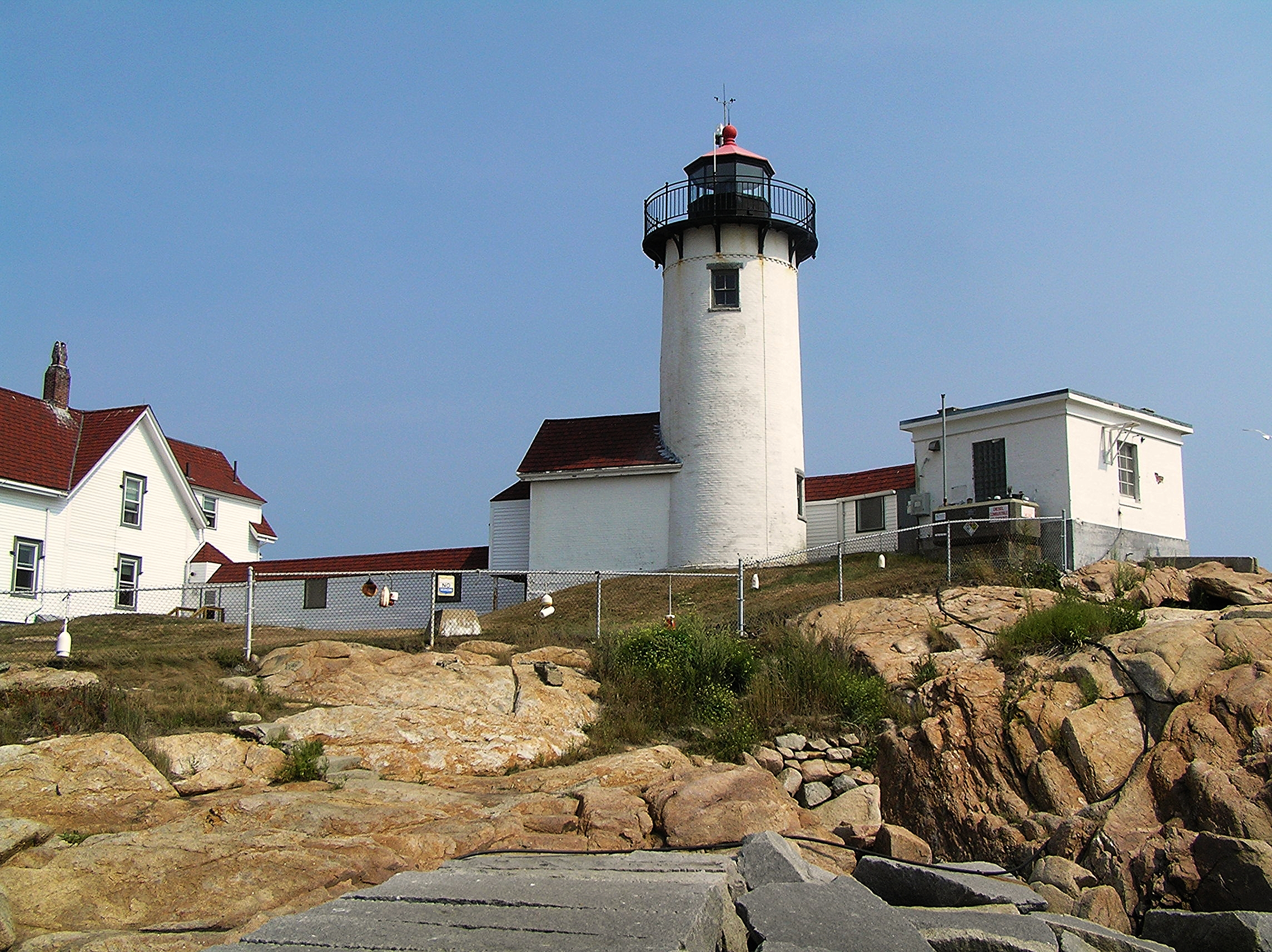
- Downtown Gloucester Man at the Wheel Hammond Castle City Hall Eastern Point Light

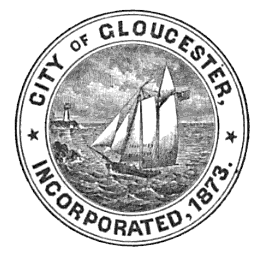
- Seal
- Nickname: "The Place To Be In The Summer"
- Motto: "America's Oldest Seaport"
- Location in Essex County and Massachusetts.

- Location in Massachusetts Gloucester (the United States)
- Coordinates: 42°36′57″N 70°39′45″W
- Country: United States
- State: Massachusetts
- County: Essex
- Settled: 1623
- Incorporated (town): 1642
- Incorporated (city): 1873
- Named for: Gloucester, England

Government
  - Type: Mayor-council city
  - Mayor: Paul Lundberg

Area
  - Total: 41.51 sq mi (107.51 km^{2})
  - Land: 26.19 sq mi (67.84 km^{2})
  - Water: 15.32 sq mi (39.68 km^{2})
- Elevation: 49 ft (15 m)

Population (2020)
  - Total: 29,729
  - Density: 1,135.0/sq mi (438.23/km^{2})
- Time zone: UTC−5 (Eastern)
  - Summer (DST): UTC−4 (Eastern)
- ZIP code: 01930
- Area code: 351 / 978
- FIPS code: 25-26150
- GNIS feature ID: 0615084
- Website: gloucester-ma.gov

Gloucester (/ˈɡlɒstər/ GLOS-tər) is a city in Essex County, Massachusetts, United States. It sits on Cape Ann and is a part of Massachusetts's North Shore. The population was 29,729 at the 2020 U.S. census. An important center of the fishing industry and a popular summer destination, Gloucester consists of an urban core on the north side of the harbor and the outlying neighborhoods of Annisquam, Bay View, Lanesville, Folly Cove, Magnolia, Riverdale, East Gloucester, and West Gloucester.

== History ==
The boundaries of Gloucester originally included the town of Rockport, in an area dubbed "Sandy Bay". The village separated formally from Gloucester on February 27, 1840. In 1873, Gloucester was reincorporated as a city.

=== Contact period ===
Native Americans inhabited what would become northeastern Massachusetts for thousands of years prior to the European colonization of the Americas. At the time of contact, the area was inhabited by Agawam people under sachem Masconomet. Evidence of a village exists on Pole's Hill in the current Riverdale neighborhood.

In 1606, Samuel de Champlain explored the harbor, and produced the first known map of Gloucester harbor titling it le Beau port. This map suggests substantial Native American settlement on the shores of the harbor. In 1614 John Smith again explored the area, identifying the indigenous inhabitants as Aggawom. In 1623 men from the Dorchester Company established a permanent fishing outpost in the area.

At the Cape Ann settlement, a legal form of government was established, and from that Massachusetts Bay Colony sprung. Roger Conant was the governor under the Cape Ann patent, and as such, has been called the first governor of Massachusetts.

Life in this first settlement was harsh and it was short-lived. The area was abandoned around 1626, and the people removed themselves to Naumkeag (in what is now called Salem, Massachusetts), where more fertile soil for planting was to be found. The meetinghouse and governor's house were even disassembled and relocated to the new place of settlement.

=== Second English Settlement ===
At some point in the following years (though no record exists), the area was slowly resettled by English colonists. The town was formally incorporated in 1642. It is at this time that the name "Gloucester" first appears on tax rolls, although in various spellings. The town took its name from the city of Gloucester in southwest England, perhaps from where many of its new occupants originated but more likely because Gloucester, England, was a Parliamentarian stronghold, successfully defended with the aid of the Earl of Essex against the King in the Siege of Gloucester of 1643.

This new permanent settlement focused on the Town Green area, an inlet in the marshes at a bend in the Annisquam River. This area is now the site of Grant Circle, a large traffic rotary at which Massachusetts Route 128 mingles with a major city street (Washington Street/Rt 127). Here the first permanent settlers built a meeting house and therefore focused the nexus of their settlement on the "Island" for nearly 100 years. Unlike other early coastal towns in New England, development in Gloucester was not focused around the harbor as it is today, rather it was inland that people settled first. This is evidenced by the placement of the Town Green nearly two miles from the harbor-front.

The Town Green is also where the settlers built the first school. By Massachusetts Bay Colony Law, any town with 100 families or more had to provide a public schoolhouse. This requirement was met in 1698, with Thomas Riggs standing as the town's first schoolmaster.

In 1700, the selectmen of Gloucester recognized the claim of Samuel English, grandson of Agawam sachem Masconomet, to the land of the town, and paid him seven pounds (equal to £1,243 today) for the quitclaim.

The White-Ellery House was erected in 1710 upon the Town Green. It was built at the edge of a marsh for Gloucester's first settled minister, the Reverend John White (1677–1760).

Early industry included subsistence farming and logging. Because of the poor soil and rocky hills, Cape Ann was not well suited for farming on a large scale. Small family farms and livestock provided the bulk of the sustenance to the population. Fishing, for which the town is known today, was limited to close-to-shore, with families subsisting on small catches as opposed to the great bounties yielded in later years. The fishermen of Gloucester did not command the Grand Banks until the mid-18th century. Historian Christine Heyrman, examining the town's society between 1690 and 1750, finds that at the beginning community sensibility was weak in a town that was a loose agglomeration of individuals. Commerce and capitalism transformed the society, making it much more closely knit with extended families interlocking in business relationships.

Early Gloucestermen cleared great swaths of the forest of Cape Ann for farm and pasture land, using the timber to build structures as far away as Boston. The rocky moors of Gloucester remained clear for two centuries until the forest reclaimed the land in the 20th century. The inland part of the island became known as the "Commons", the "Common Village", or "Dogtown". Small dwellings lay scattered here amongst the boulders and swamps, along roads that meandered through the hills. These dwellings were at times little more than shanties; only one was even two stories tall. Despite their size, several generations of families were raised in such houses. One feature of the construction of these houses was that under one side of the floor was dug a cellar hole (for the keeping of food), supported by a foundation of laid-stone (without mortar). These cellar holes are still visible today along the trails throughout the inland part of Gloucester; they, and some walls, are all that remain of the village there.

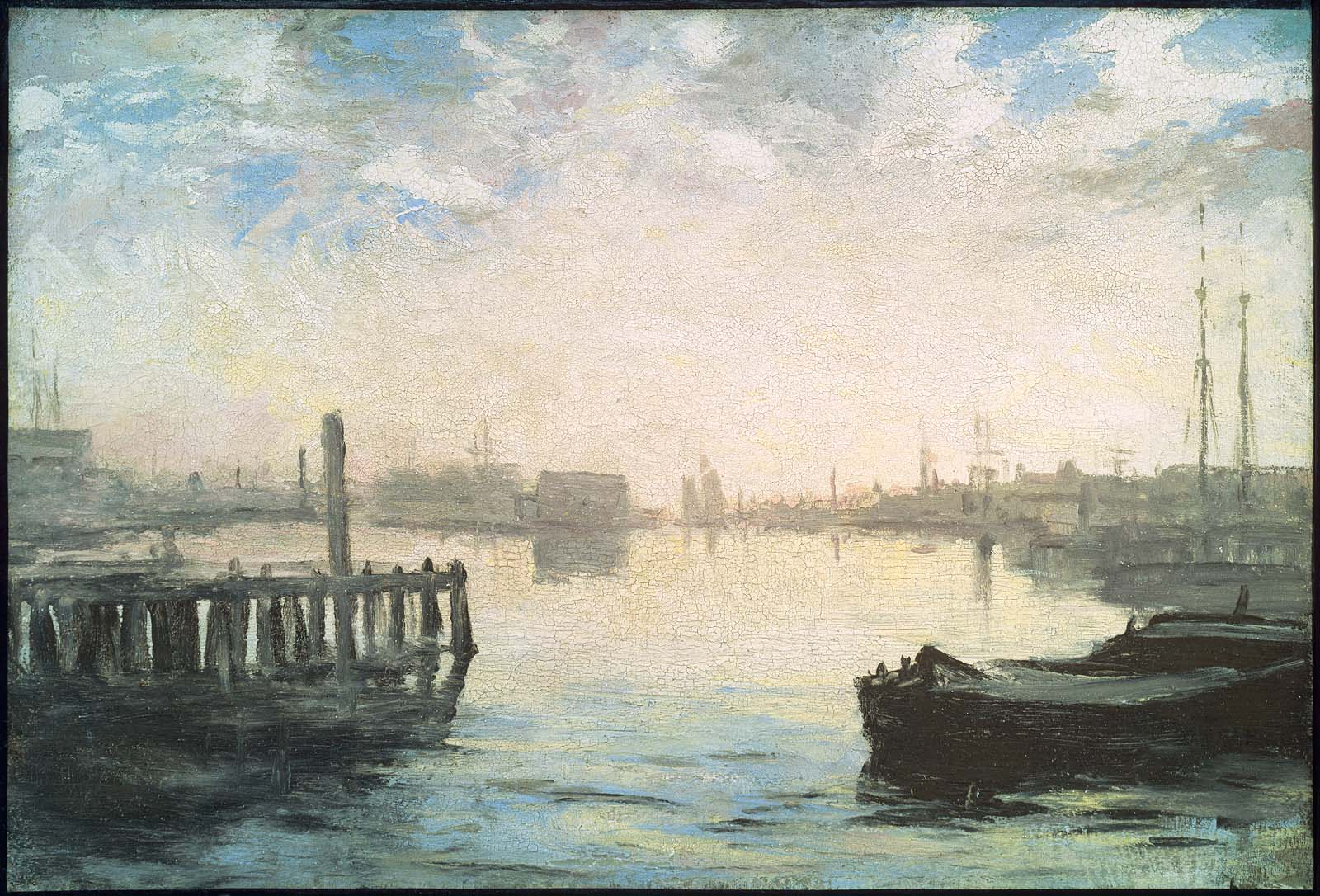
Gloucester Harbor c. 1877, William Morris Hunt

=== Growth ===
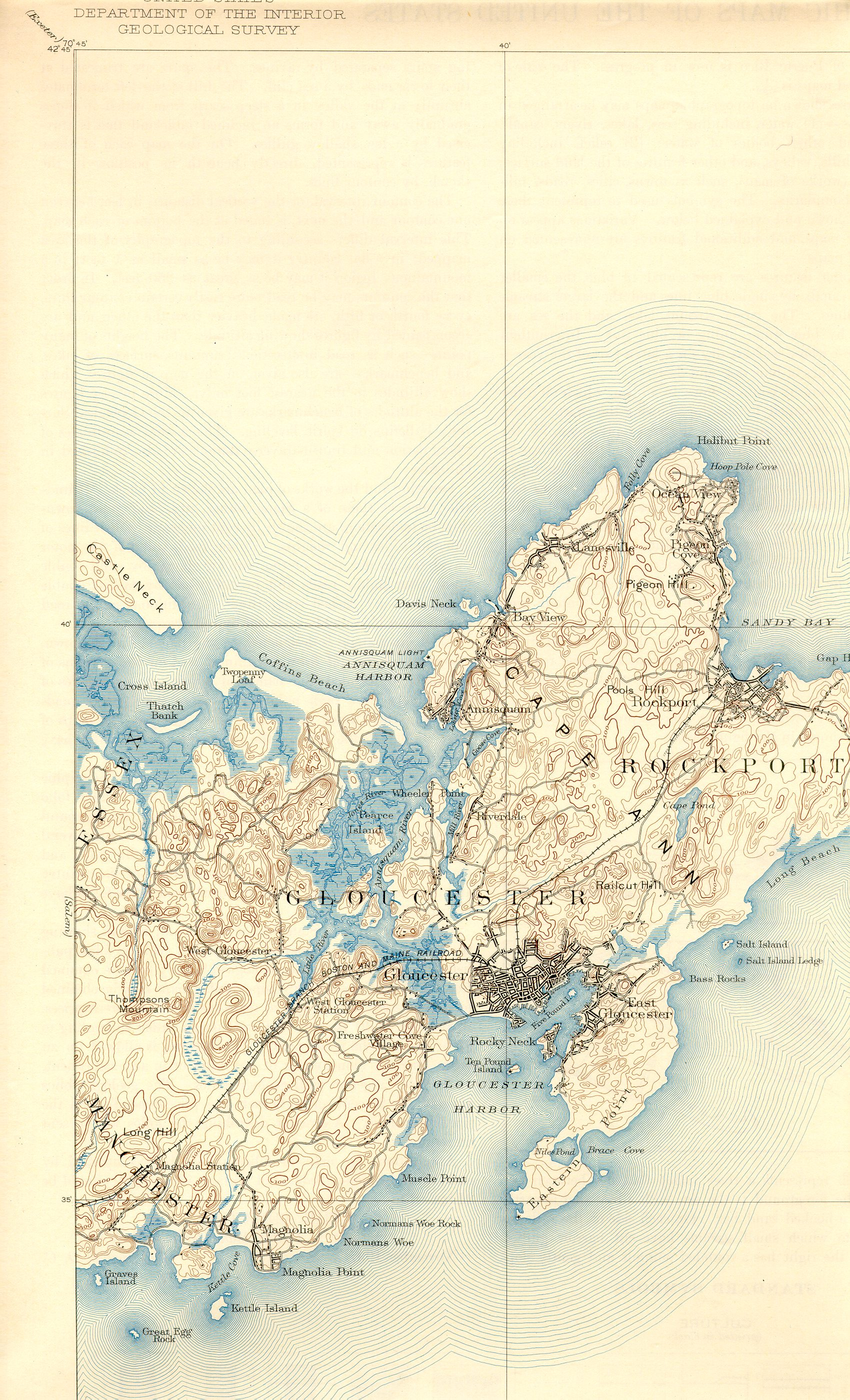
1893 map of Gloucester

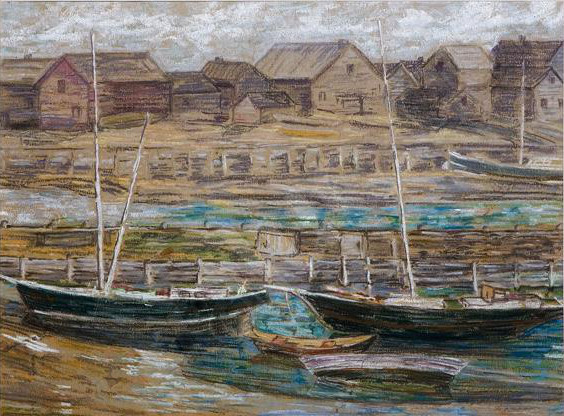
Charles S. Kaelin. "Gloucester Harbor Scene"

The town grew, and eventually colonists lived on the opposite side of the Annisquam River. In a time of legally mandated church attendance this was a long way to walk—or row—on a Sunday morning. In 1718 the settlers on the opposite shore of the river split off from the First Parish community at the Green and formed "Second Parish". While still part of the town of Gloucester, the people of Second, or "West", Parish now constructed their own meetinghouse and designated their own place of burial, both of which were in the hills near the marshes behind Wingaersheek Beach. The meetinghouse is gone now, but deep in the woods on the Second Parish Road, Old Thompson road, one can still find the stone foundation and memorial altar, as well as scattered stones of the abandoned burial ground.

Other parts of town later followed suit. Third Parish, in northern Gloucester, was founded in 1728. Fourth Parish split off from First Parish in 1742. Finally, in 1754, the people of Sandy Bay (what would later be called Rockport) split off from First Parish to found Fifth Parish. The Sandy Bay church founding was the last religious re-ordering of the colonial period. All of these congregations still exist in some form, with the exception of Fourth Parish, the site of whose meeting house is now a highway.

At one time, there was a thriving granite industry in Gloucester. English writer Harriet Martineau, who visited Gloucester during her travels in the United States in the mid-1830s, commented on the ubiquity of granite there:

It has great wealth of granite and fish. It is composed of granite; and almost its only visitors are fish. **** The houses look as if they were squeezed in among the rocks. The granite rises straight behind a house, encroaches on each side, and overhangs the roof, leaving space only for a sprinkling of grass about the door, for a red shrub or two to wave from a crevice, and a drip of water to flow down among gay weeds. Room for these dwellings is obtained by blasting the rocks. Formerly, people were frightened at fragments falling through the roof after a blasting: but now, it has become too common an occurrence to alarm any body.

== Geography and transportation ==
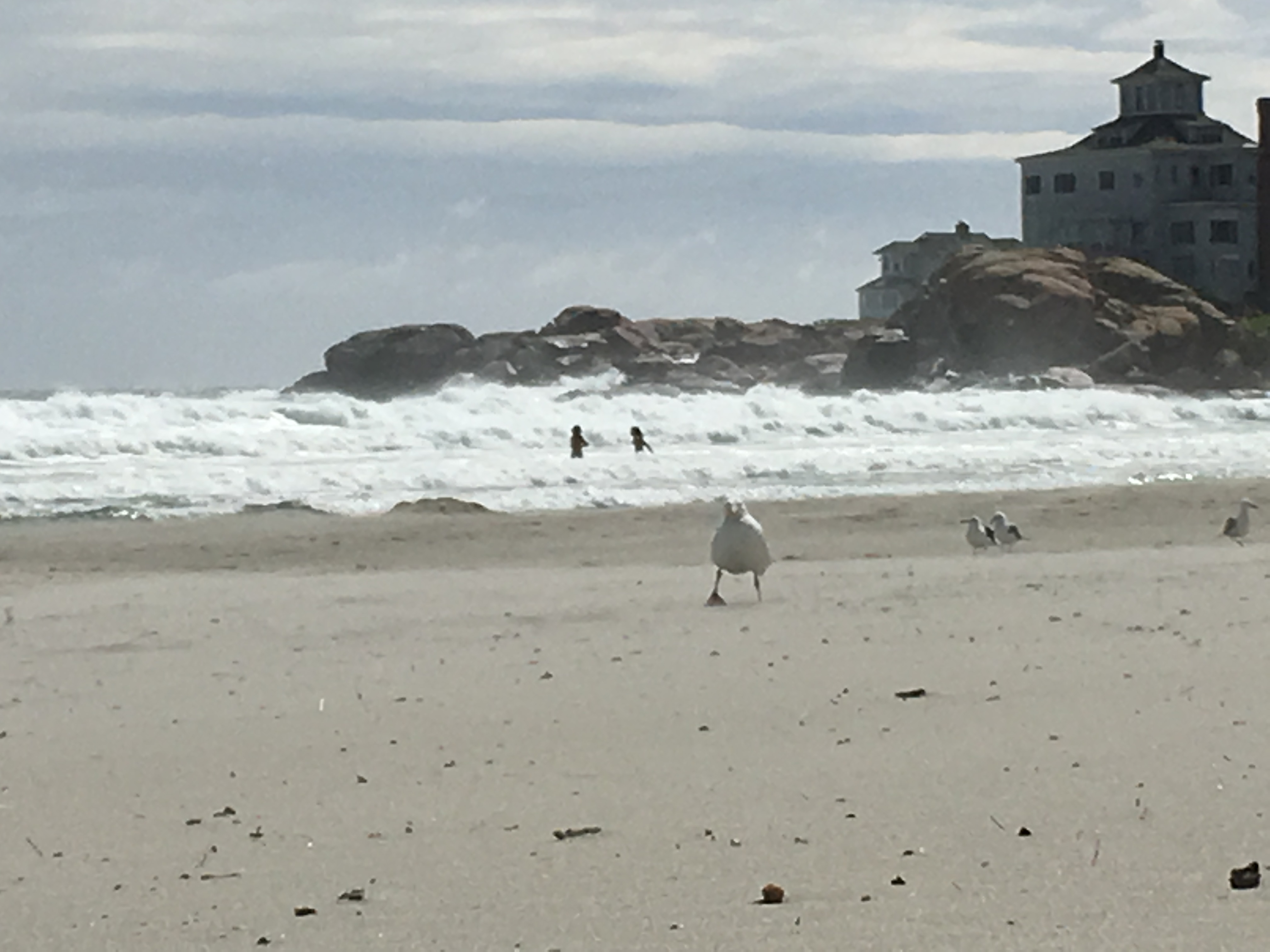
Good Harbor Beach, a beach in Gloucester

Gloucester is located at 42°37′26″N 70°40′32″W (42.624015, −70.675521). According to the United States Census Bureau, the city has a total area of 41.5 square miles (107.5 km^{2}), of which 26.2 square miles (67.8 km^{2}) is land and 15.3 square miles (39.6 km^{2}), or 36.88%, is water.

Gloucester occupies most of the eastern end of Cape Ann, except for the far tip, which is the town of Rockport. The city is split in half by the Annisquam River, which flows northward through the middle of the city into Ipswich Bay. At its southern end, it is connected to Gloucester Harbor by the Blynman Canal. The land along the northwestern shore of the river is marshy, creating several small islands. Gloucester Harbor is divided into several smaller coves, including the Western Harbor (site of the Fisherman's Memorial) and the Inner Harbor (home to the Gloucester fishing fleet). The eastern side of Gloucester Harbor is divided from the rest of Massachusetts Bay by Eastern Point, extending some 2 miles (3 km) outward from the mainland. There are several parks in the city, the largest of which are Ravenswood Park, Stage Fort Park and Mount Ann Park.

Gloucester lies between Ipswich Bay to the north and Massachusetts Bay to the south. The city is bordered on the east by Rockport, and on the west by Ipswich, Essex and Manchester-by-the-Sea to the west. (The town line with Ipswich is located across Essex Harbor, and as such there is no land connection between the towns.) Gloucester lies 16 miles (26 km) east-northeast of Salem and 31 miles (50 km) northeast of Boston. Gloucester lies at the northern terminus of Route 128, which ends at Route 127A. Route 127A begins at Route 127 just east of the Route 128 terminus, heading into Rockport before terminating there. Route 127 enters from Manchester-by-the-Sea before crossing the Blynman Canal and passing through downtown towards Rockport. It then re-enters Gloucester near Folly Cove, running opposite of its usual north–south orientation towards its terminus at Route 128. Route 133 also terminates within the city, entering from Essex and terminating just west of the Blynman Canal at Route 127. Besides the bridge over the Blynman Canal, there are only two other connections between the eastern and western halves of town, the A. Piatt Andrew Memorial Bridge, carrying Route 128, and the Boston & Maine Railroad Bridge, just north of the Blynman Canal.

Gloucester is home to the Cape Ann Transportation Authority, which serves the city and surrounding towns. Two stops (in West Gloucester and in Downtown Gloucester) provide access to the Newburyport/Rockport Line of the MBTA Commuter Rail, which extends from Rockport along the North Shore to Boston's North Station. The nearest airport is the Beverly Municipal Airport, with the nearest national and international air service being at Boston's Logan International Airport.

Climate data for Gloucester, Massachusetts
Month	Jan	Feb	Mar	Apr	May	Jun	Jul	Aug	Sep	Oct	Nov	Dec	Year
Record high °F (°C)	68 (20)	65 (18)	86 (30)	88 (31)	95 (35)	98 (37)	100 (38)	100 (38)	97 (36)	87 (31)	76 (24)	74 (23)	100 (38)
Mean daily maximum °F (°C)	35.3 (1.8)	38.0 (3.3)	45.0 (7.2)	55.4 (13.0)	65.4 (18.6)	74.4 (23.6)	79.9 (26.6)	78.6 (25.9)	71.2 (21.8)	60.5 (15.8)	50.7 (10.4)	40.3 (4.6)	57.9 (14.4)
Mean daily minimum °F (°C)	18.1 (−7.7)	20.3 (−6.5)	27.0 (−2.8)	35.9 (2.2)	45.5 (7.5)	55.1 (12.8)	60.6 (15.9)	59.8 (15.4)	52.3 (11.3)	41.0 (5.0)	33.2 (0.7)	23.7 (−4.6)	39.4 (4.1)
Record low °F (°C)	−12 (−24)	−12 (−24)	−2 (−19)	12 (−11)	30 (−1)	31 (−1)	46 (8)	43 (6)	33 (1)	20 (−7)	10 (−12)	−15 (−26)	−15 (−26)
Average precipitation inches (mm)	4.22 (107)	3.54 (90)	4.25 (108)	4.34 (110)	3.55 (90)	3.63 (92)	3.46 (88)	3.40 (86)	3.87 (98)	4.22 (107)	4.69 (119)	4.27 (108)	47.44 (1,205)
Average snowfall inches (cm)	12.6 (32)	12.7 (32)	7.7 (20)	1.4 (3.6)	0 (0)	0 (0)	0 (0)	0 (0)	0 (0)	0 (0)	0.6 (1.5)	7.2 (18)	42.2 (107)
Source 1:
Source 2:

Average sea temperature:
Jan	Feb	Mar	Apr	May	Jun	Jul	Aug	Sep	Oct	Nov	Dec	Year
42.3 °F (5.7 °C)	39.4 °F (4.1 °C)	39.4 °F (4.1 °C)	42.8 °F (6.0 °C)	50.4 °F (10.2 °C)	57.9 °F (14.4 °C)	65.5 °F (18.6 °C)	66.9 °F (19.4 °C)	63.5 °F (17.5 °C)	57.4 °F (14.1 °C)	50.7 °F (10.4 °C)	46.0 °F (7.8 °C)	51.9 °F (11.1 °C)

== Demographics ==
Historical population
Year	Pop.	±%
1790	5,317	—
1800	5,313	−0.1%
1810	5,943	+11.9%
1820	6,384	+7.4%
1830	7,510	+17.6%
1840	6,350	−15.4%
1850	7,786	+22.6%
1860	10,904	+40.0%
1870	15,389	+41.1%
1880	19,329	+25.6%
1890	24,651	+27.5%
1900	26,121	+6.0%
1910	24,398	−6.6%
1920	22,947	−5.9%
1930	24,204	+5.5%
1940	24,046	−0.7%
1950	25,167	+4.7%
1960	25,789	+2.5%
1970	27,941	+8.3%
1980	27,768	−0.6%
1990	28,716	+3.4%
2000	30,273	+5.4%
2010	28,789	−4.9%
2020	29,729	+3.3%
2024*	30,491	+2.6%
* = population estimate. Source: United States census records and Population Estimates Program data. Source: U.S. Decennial Census

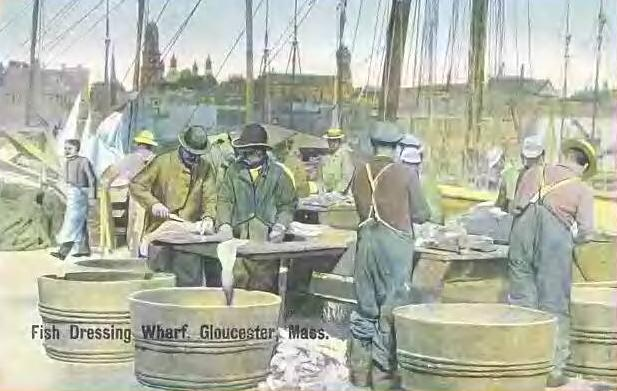
Fish Dressing Wharf c. 1908

=== 2020 census ===
As of the 2020 census, there were 29,729 people and 13,299 households in the city, with a population density of 1,135.0 inhabitants per square mile (438.2/km^{2}). There were 15,133 housing units at an average density of 577.8 per square mile (223.1/km^{2}).

89.0% of residents lived in urban areas, while 11.0% lived in rural areas.

There were 13,299 households in Gloucester, of which 20.7% had children under the age of 18 living in them. Of all households, 43.9% were married-couple households, 18.8% were households with a male householder and no spouse or partner present, and 30.1% were households with a female householder and no spouse or partner present. About 33.6% of all households were made up of individuals and 15.9% had someone living alone who was 65 years of age or older.

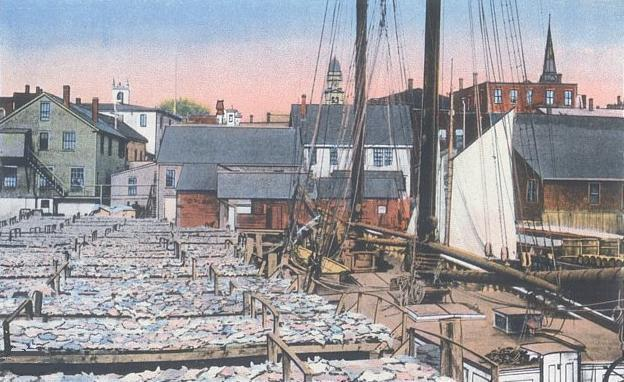
Drying Fish c. 1915

The median age was 50.4 years. 16.0% of residents were under the age of 18. The population was 17.5% under the age of 19, 4.9% from 20 to 24, 21.6% from 25 to 44, 30.6% from 45 to 64, and 25.3% who were 65 years of age or older. For every 100 females there were 91.9 males, and for every 100 females age 18 and over there were 89.9 males age 18 and over.

Racial composition as of the 2020 census
Race	Number	Percent
White	26,489	89.1%
Black or African American	331	1.1%
American Indian and Alaska Native	75	0.3%
Asian	334	1.1%
Native Hawaiian and Other Pacific Islander	20	0.1%
Some other race	837	2.8%
Two or more races	1,643	5.5%
Hispanic or Latino (of any race)	1,386	4.7%

=== Income and poverty ===
The median income for a household in the city was $83,883, and the median income for a family was $119,066 from a 2024 estimate. The per capita income for the city was $25,595. About 9.6% of the population were below the poverty line, including 13.7% of those under age 18 and 9.4% of those age 65 or over.

== Politics ==
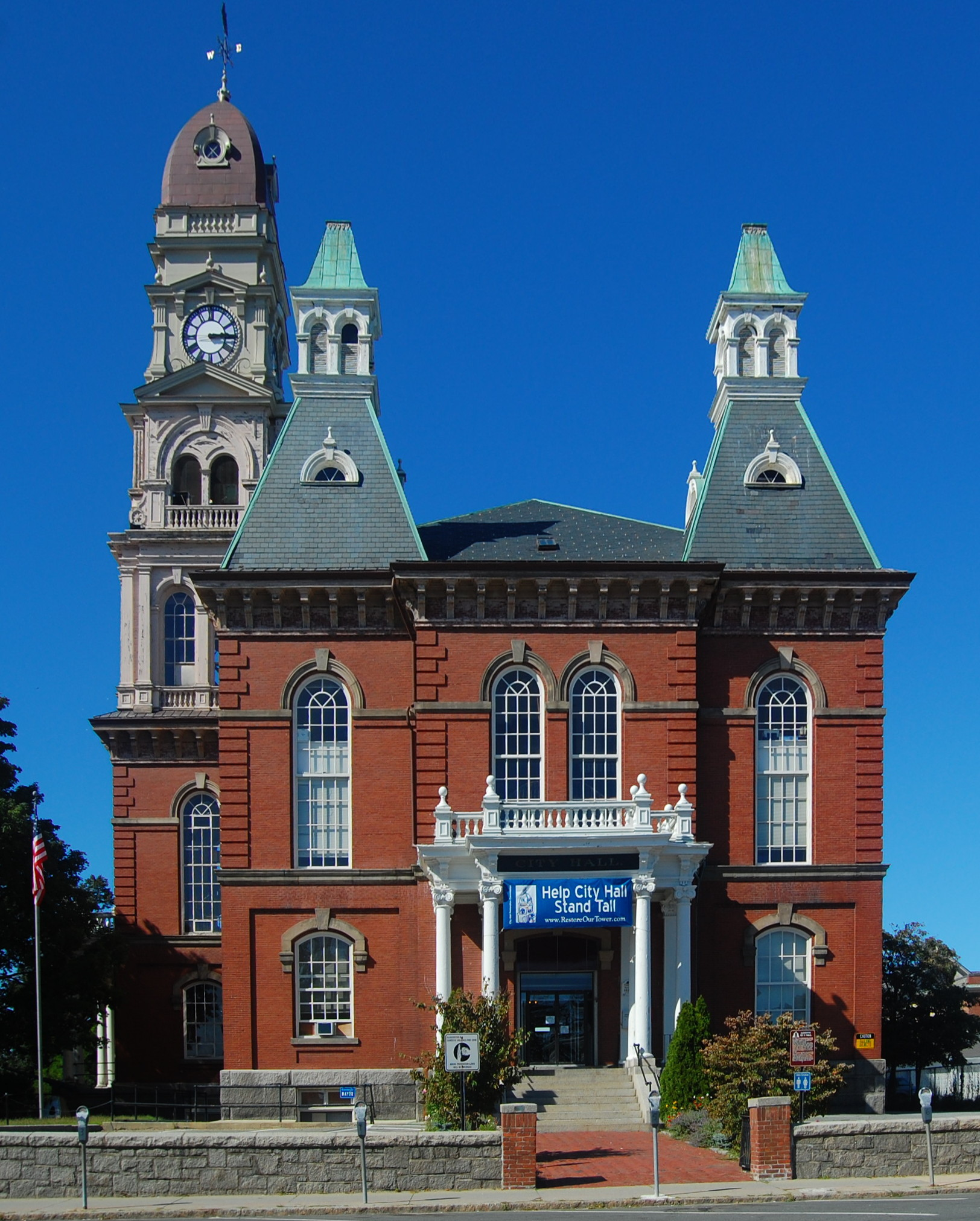
Gloucester City Hall, built in 1871

Gloucester is a city, with a strong mayor-council system. The current mayor of Gloucester is Paul Lundberg as of January 2026. The Mayor is also reserved a seat on the School Committee. City offices are elected every two years (those ending with odd numbers). In 2007, over 40 people ran for the 15 elected seats in the city's government.

The city is divided into five Wards, each split into two precincts:

- Ward 1: East Gloucester – includes Eastern Point and Rocky Neck
- Ward 2: Downtown and the Harbor area
- Ward 3: The western edge of the "island" from Stacy Boulevard to Wheeler's Point – includes the Heights at Cape Ann and Pond View Village.
- Ward 4: North Gloucester – includes Riverdale, Annisquam, Bay View, and Lanesville.
- Ward 5: The entirety of West Gloucester west of the Annisquam River and Blynman Canal to Manchester-by-the-Sea and Essex – includes the Wingaersheek area and village of Magnolia.

As late as the mid-20th century, Gloucester had as many as eight wards, but they have been since reorganized into the current number.

On November 7, 2005, incumbent Mayor John Bell was re-elected to a third term in office. He stated his intention not to run for reelection and stepped down in January 2008.

On November 6, 2007, Carolyn Kirk was elected as the Mayor of Gloucester. Kirk resigned in December 2014 to take a position in the administration of Massachusetts governor Charlie Baker. Sefatia Theken was then voted to be the interim mayor of Gloucester by the City Council. Theken was elected to serve a full two-year term on November 2, 2015, and re-elected again in 2017 and 2019. She was defeated for re-election in 2021 by Gregory P. Verga. Verga was defeated in his 2025 reelection campaign by Paul Lundberg after making an obscene gesture towards striking teachers.

Gloucester presidential election results
Year	Democratic	Republican	Third parties	Total Votes	Margin
2024	62.84% 11,138	34.84% 6,175	2.32% 412	17,725	28.00%
2020	66.84% 12,138	30.81% 5,595	2.35% 426	18,159	36.03%
2016	60.70% 9,808	33.14% 5,355	6.16% 995	16,158	27.56%
2012	62.63% 9,780	35.44% 5,535	1.93% 301	15,616	27.18%
2008	64.54% 9,967	33.11% 5,113	2.36% 364	15,444	31.43%
2004	63.79% 9,536	34.69% 5,185	1.52% 227	14,948	29.11%
2000	61.11% 8,352	30.41% 4,156	8.48% 1,159	13,667	30.70%
1996	62.78% 7,966	25.95% 3,293	11.26% 1,429	12,688	36.83%
1992	48.55% 6,808	28.40% 3,982	23.05% 3,232	14,022	20.15%
1988	56.16% 7,440	42.81% 5,671	1.03% 137	13,248	13.35%
1984	45.12% 5,768	54.58% 6,978	0.31% 39	12,785	9.46%
1980	38.81% 4,928	43.55% 5,530	17.63% 2,239	12,697	4.74%
1976	53.00% 6,795	43.54% 5,582	3.46% 443	12,820	9.46%
1972	50.09% 6,150	49.48% 6,076	0.43% 53	12,279	0.60%
1968	58.39% 6,900	38.36% 4,533	3.26% 385	11,818	20.03%
1964	72.96% 8,749	26.74% 3,207	0.30% 36	11,992	46.21%
1960	52.75% 6,719	47.14% 6,005	0.11% 14	12,738	5.61%
1956	30.55% 3,497	69.25% 7,926	0.19% 22	11,445	38.70%
1952	36.47% 4,390	63.34% 7,624	0.18% 22	12,036	26.87%
1948	44.97% 4,448	53.53% 5,295	1.51% 149	9,892	8.56%
1944	46.88% 4,445	53.01% 5,026	0.11% 10	9,481	6.13%
1940	41.86% 4,270	57.70% 5,885	0.44% 45	10,200	15.83%

Voter registration and party enrollment as of February 1, 2025
Party	Number of voters	Percentage
Democratic	5,204	22.56%
Republican	1,859	8.06%
Unenrolled	15,755	68.29%
Political Designations	253	1.09%
Total	23,071	100%

== Education ==
The following schools are located within the Gloucester Public Schools District:

- Gloucester High School (9–12)
- O'Maley Innovation Middle School (6–8)
- East Veterans Elementary School (K-5) (Formerly East Gloucester Elementary School; the former Veteran's Memorial School (which has been demloished) was merged into it)
- Plum Cove Elementary School (K–5)
- Beeman Elementary School (K–5)
- West Parish Elementary School (K–5) (site of the West Parish Elementary School Science Park)
- Gloucester Preschool

== Economy ==
Gorton's of Gloucester, Mighty Mac, Gloucester Engineering, Good Harbor Consulting, Para Research, Aid-Pack, Cyrk, and Varian Semiconductor are among the companies based in Gloucester.

== Gloucester and the sea ==
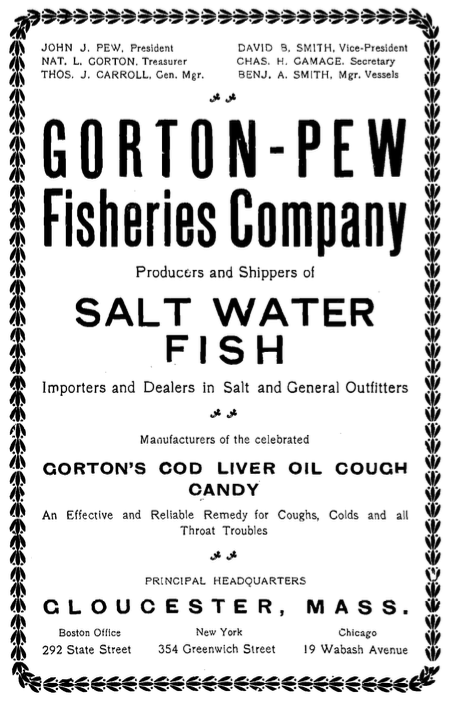
1910 advertisement for Gorton-Pew Fisheries (now Gorton's of Gloucester)

The town was an important shipbuilding center, and the first schooner was reputedly built there in 1713. The community developed into an important fishing port, largely due to its proximity to Georges Bank and other fishing banks off the east coast of Nova Scotia and Newfoundland. Gorton's of Gloucester is a major seafood business which was founded in 1849 as John Pew & Sons. It became Gorton-Pew Fisheries in 1906, and in 1957 changed its name to Gorton's of Gloucester. The image of the "Gorton's Fisherman" is well-known. Besides catching and processing seafood, Gloucester is also a center for research on marine life and conservation; Ocean Alliance is headquartered in the city.

In the late 19th century, Gloucester saw an influx of Portuguese and Italian immigrants; they were seeking work in the town's flourishing fishing industry, and a better life in America. Some present-day fishermen of Gloucester are descendants of these early immigrants. The strong Portuguese and Italian influence is evident in the many festivals celebrated throughout the year. During the Catholic celebration, St Peter's Fiesta, relatives of fishermen past and present carry oars representing many of the fishing vessels which call Gloucester their home. Saint Peter is the patron saint of the fishermen. Gloucester remains an active fishing port, and in 2013 ranked 21st in the United States with respect to fish landings. In that year, 62 million pounds of fish were caught bringing in an estimated $42 million.

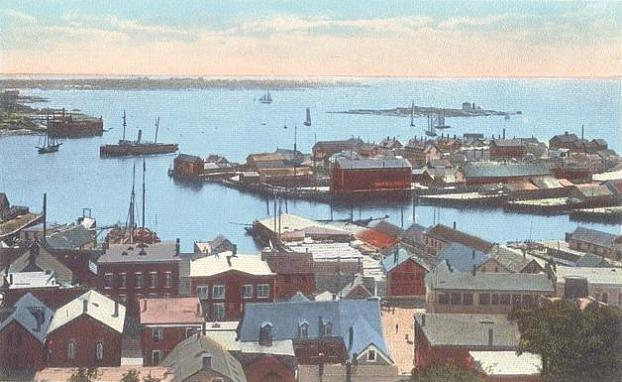
Harbor View & Ten Pound Island Light c. 1915

== Arts ==
=== Painting and printmaking ===
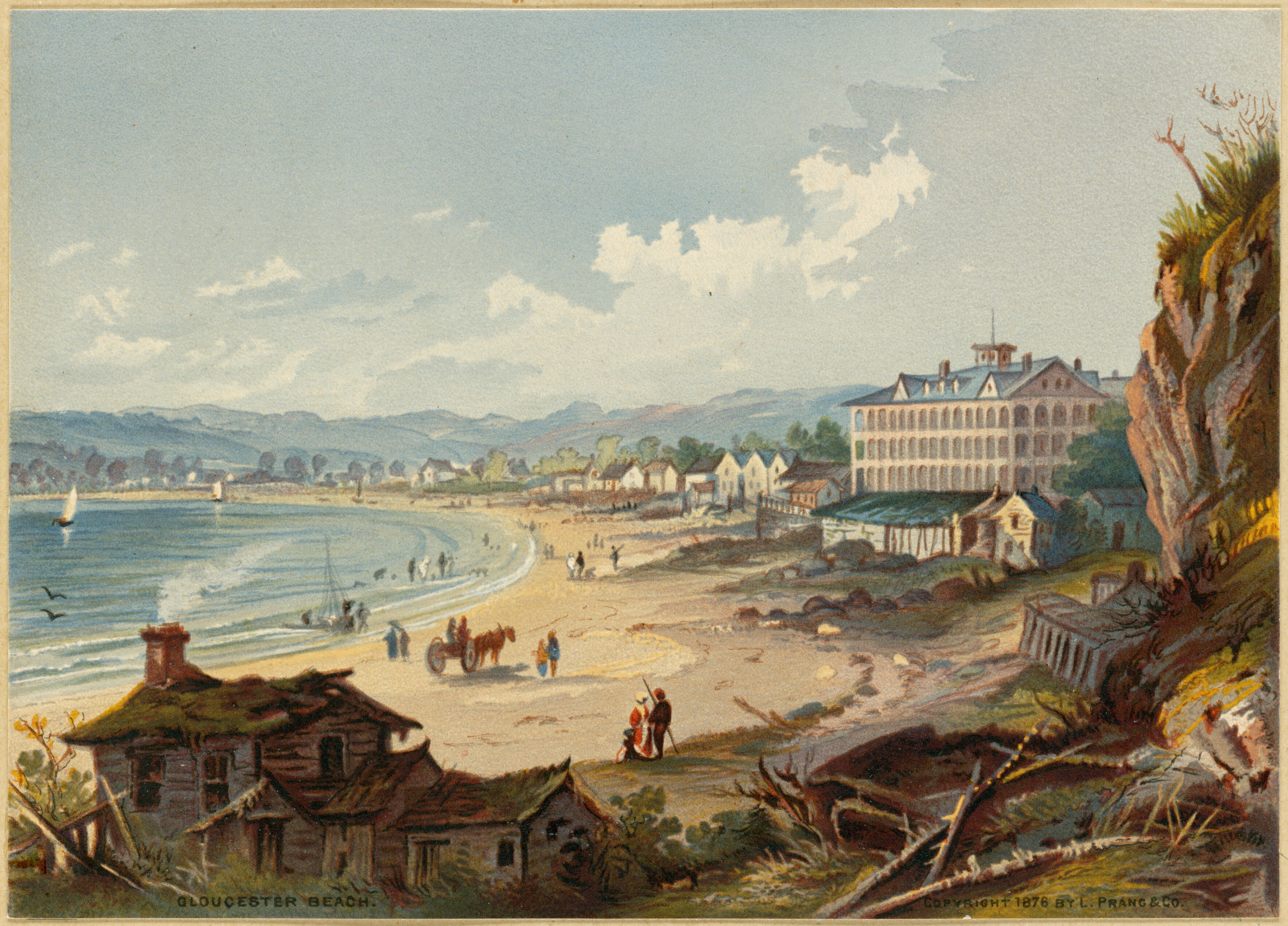
Gloucester Beach, (c) 1876; from the Louis Prang & Company Collection of the Boston Public Library

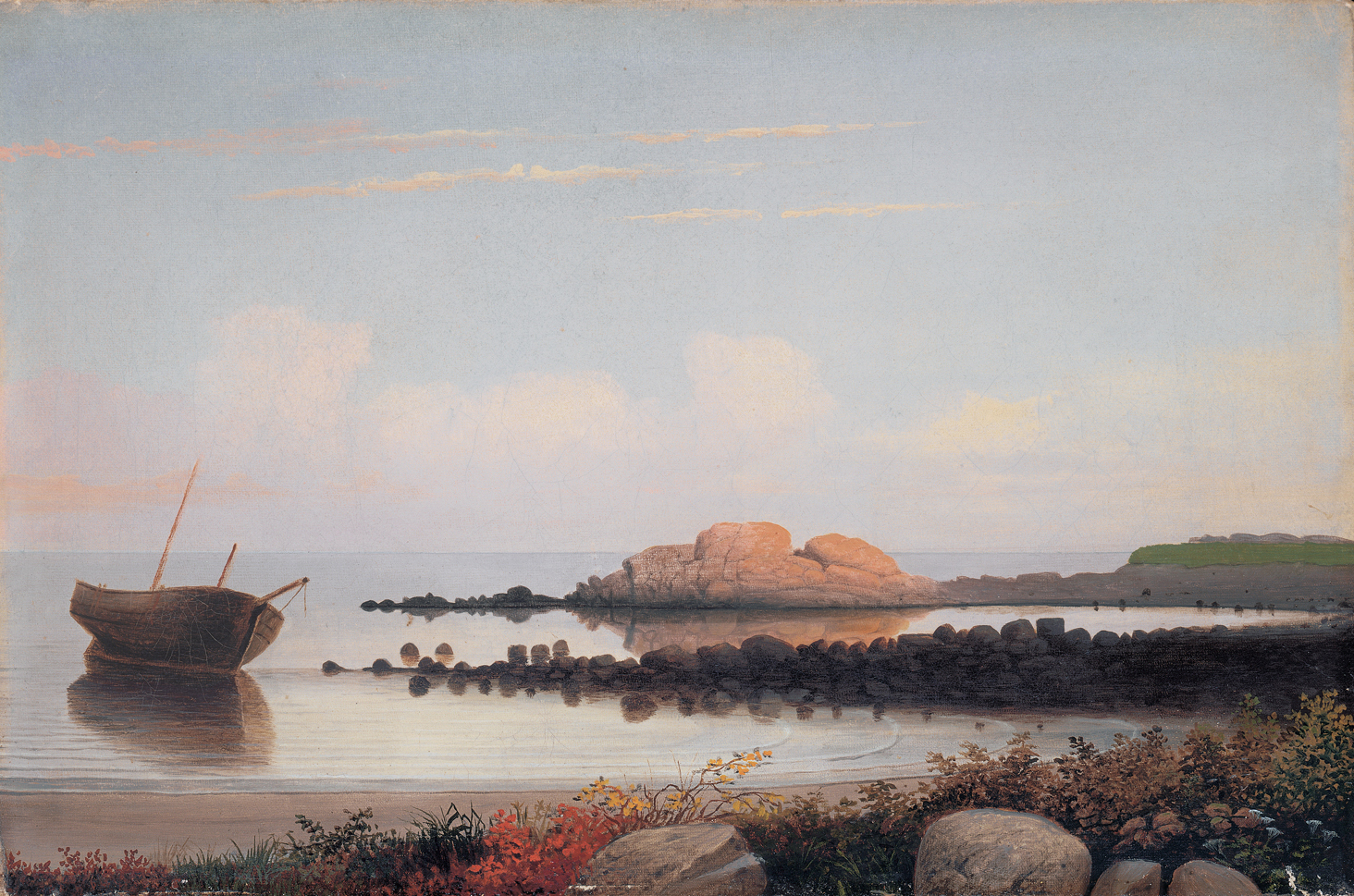
Brace's Rock, Eastern Point, Gloucester, c. 1864 by Fitz Henry Lane

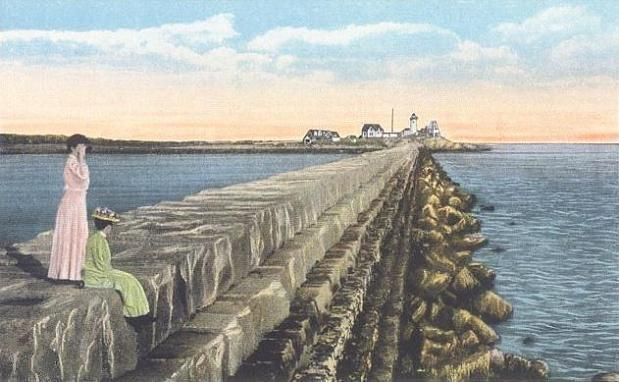
Eastern Point Breakwater & Lighthouse c. 1915

Gloucester's scenery, active fishing industry, and arts community have attracted and inspired painters since the early 19th century. The first Gloucester painter of note was native-born Fitz Henry Lane, whose home still exists on the waterfront. The premier collection of his works is in the Cape Ann Museum, which holds 40 of his paintings and 100 of his drawings. Other painters subsequently attracted to Gloucester include William Morris Hunt, Winslow Homer, Childe Hassam, John Twachtman, Frederick Mulhaupt, Frank Duveneck, Cecilia Beaux, Jane Peterson, Gordon Grant, Harry DeMaine, Emile Gruppe, Stuart Davis, Joseph Solman, Mark Rothko, Milton Avery, Barnett Newman, William Meyerowitz, Joan Lockhart, Theresa Bernstein, Samuel Nigro, and Marsden Hartley, and artists from the Ashcan School such as Edward Hopper, John Sloan, Robert Henri, William Glackens, Emile Gruppe, Carl W. Illig, and Maurice Prendergast.

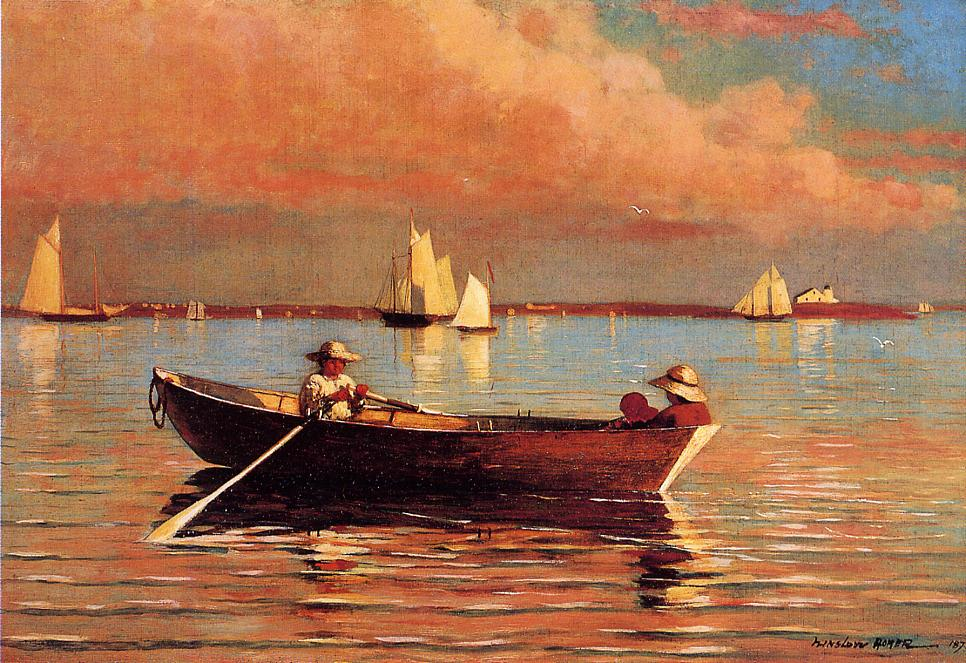
Gloucester Harbor, oil on canvas, Winslow Homer, 1873. Nelson-Atkins Museum of Art

Smith Cove is home to the Rocky Neck Art Colony, the oldest art colony in the country. Folly Cove was the home of the Folly Cove Designers, influential to this day in print design and technique.

=== Sculpture ===
Several important sculptors have lived and worked in East Gloucester, Annisquam, Lanesville and Folly Cove. They include George Aarons, Anna Hyatt Huntington, Charles Grafly, Paul Manship and his daughter-in-law Margaret Cassidy Manship, Walker Hancock, and George Demetrios. In addition, Aristides Demetrios grew up in Folly Cove.

=== Literature ===
- Captains Courageous (1897) by Rudyard Kipling was set in Gloucester, and adapted as a 1937 movie starring Spencer Tracy.
- T. S. Eliot (1888–1965) summered at the family house near Eastern Point in his early years. This house is now owned by the TS Eliot Foundation and used as a writer's retreat. Eliot drew great inspiration from Gloucester, and his early poems were collected in a notebook purchased from Procters on Main Street, and now part of the Berg Collection at the New York Public Library. One of his Four Quartets is entitled The Dry Salvages, the rocks off the N.E. coast of Gloucester.
- Charles Olson (1910–1970), a poet and teacher at Black Mountain College in North Carolina, composed a 635-page poem known as The Maximus Poems, which centered on Gloucester.
- Gloucester is often referred to in the works of horror writer H. P. Lovecraft. The fictional town of Innsmouth in Lovecraft's The Shadow Over Innsmouth is believed partially based on Cape Ann as a whole and Gloucester in particular.
- The book The Perfect Storm, which recounted a massive storm of 1991, had figures based in the town. Scenes from the film adaptation by the same name were filmed there.
- Gloucester and its coast guard station are the center of the land action in Michael J. Tougias' 2005 book Ten Hours Until Dawn, recounting the loss of the pilot boat Can Do and its crew during the blizzard of 1978.
- Gloucesterbook, Gloucestertide, and Gloucestermas are three novels in the Gloucesterman series by Gloucester novelist Jonathan Bayliss set in Gloucester, fictionalized as "Dogtown" on "Cape Gloucester".
- Hersenschimmen (Out of Mind), a 1984 novel by J. Bernlef, is set in Gloucester.
- Anita Diamant has set two novels in Gloucester, The Last Days of Dogtown and Good Harbor.

=== Comics ===
Gloucester is the birthplace of Marvel character Dane Whitman whose superhero alter ego is the Black Knight.

=== Film ===
- Author! Author! had scenes shot on Good Harbor Beach in Gloucester.
- In The Bostonians, oceanfront scenes were filmed on rocks at Rafes Chasm Park, off Hesperus Avenue.
- Captains Courageous was set in Gloucester.
- The Gloucester 18 is a documentary film that investigates the Gloucester pregnancy pact, and was filmed entirely in Gloucester.
- The Good Son was filmed in Gloucester and other Cape Ann communities.
- Grown Ups
- Manchester by the Sea much of which was filmed in Gloucester.
- Mermaids had scenes shot in the Magnolia area of Gloucester.
- Moonlight Mile was filmed almost entirely in Gloucester, with some shots in Marblehead.
- The Perfect Storm was filmed and set in Gloucester.
- Polis is This: Charles Olson and the Persistence of Place is a one-hour documentary about the poet Charles Olson which the Boston Phoenix called "the best film about an American poet ever made."
- Portions of Stuck on You were filmed in Gloucester and in neighboring Rockport. (The rink scenes were filmed at the O'Maley School.)
- The Women was partly filmed in Annisquam.
- The Russians Are Coming, the Russians Are Coming takes place on a fictional Gloucester island but was filmed in Mendocino, California.
- One Step Beyond Episode 19, "The Captain's Guests", takes place on "Cape Ann Road" set in Gloucester.
- Clear History takes place on an island in New England, and was filmed in Gloucester and around Cape Ann.
- The miniseries Olive Kitteridge: Though set in Maine, it was filmed in Gloucester and around Cape Ann.
- The 2021 film CODA is based and was shot in Gloucester.

=== Television ===
National Geographic Channel films its reality television series Wicked Tuna, documenting and chronicling the lives of commercial tuna fishermen, and the lucrative bluefin tuna industry, in Gloucester.

Route 66 season 2, episode 6, "Once To Every Man" (October 27, 1961) was set and filmed in Gloucester.

Bewitched season 7, episode 5, "Darrin On A Pedestal" (October 22, 1970) was set and partially filmed on Gloucester.

Spenser: For Hire, season 2, episode 1, "Widow's Walk" (October 4, 1986) was set and filmed in Gloucester.

=== Theater ===
The Gloucester Stage Company stages five to eight plays each season, primarily in the summer months. Located in East Gloucester, the theatre sits at water's edge overlooking Smith's Cove. It was founded in 1979 by local arts and business leaders to encourage playwrights and their new works. Israel Horovitz, who founded the GSC, was also its artistic director from 1979 to 2006. Over the years, plays developed at the Gloucester Stage Company have gone on to critical acclaim, on and off Broadway, nationally and internationally. The group draws theatre-goers from Gloucester, neighboring North Shore districts, and the greater Boston area, as well as seasonal residents and tourists.

=== Architecture ===
The city has much significant architecture, from pre-Revolutionary houses to the hilltop 1870 City Hall, which dominates the town and harbor. It also has exotic waterfront homes now converted to museums, including Beauport, built 1907–1934 by designer Henry Davis Sleeper in collaboration with local architect Halfdan Hanson, said to raise eclecticism to the level of genius. In addition, it has Hammond Castle, built 1926–1929 by inventor John Hays Hammond, Jr., as a setting for his collection of Roman, medieval and Renaissance artifacts. Gloucester was also the home of feminist writer Judith Sargent Murray and John Murray, the founder of the first Universalist Church in America. Their house still exists as the Sargent House Museum. Many museums are located in the main downtown area, such as the Cape Ann Museum, and the museum/aquarium Maritime Gloucester.

== Points of interest ==
Tour Boat Gloucester

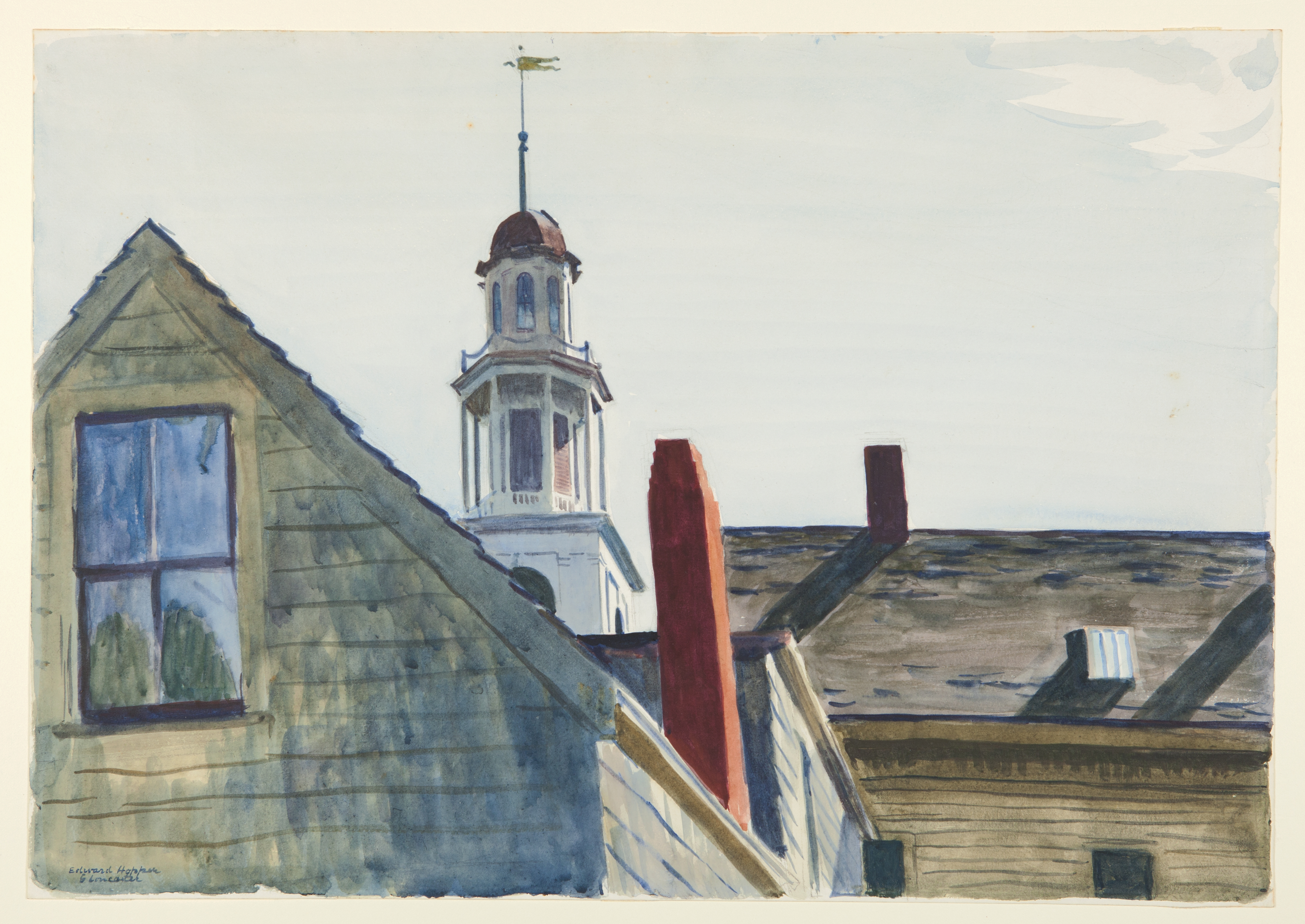
Edward Hopper, Universalist Church, 1926, Princeton University Art Museum

- The schooner Adventure
- Annisquam
- Cape Ann Museum
- Dogtown Common
- Norman's Woe, known for several shipwrecks, including The Wreck of the Hesperus
- Ravenswood Park
- Rocky Neck Art Colony, America's oldest working art colony
- Sargent House Museum
- Stage Fort Park
- White-Ellery House

Gloucester's most noted landmark is the harborside Man at the Wheel statue (also known as the "Gloucester Fisherman's Memorial Cenotaph"), dedicated to "They that go down to the sea in ships", which is a quote from Psalm 107:23–32.

Gloucester's largest annual event is St. Peter's Fiesta, sponsored by the local Italian-American community. It is held the last weekend in June, which is typically the weekend closest to the saint's feast day. Preceded by a nine-day novena of prayers, the festival highlights include the blessing of the fleet and the greasy pole contest.

== Notable people ==
- Maila Nurmi, actress
- Sylvester Ahola, jazz trumpeter and cornetist
- Willie Alexander, singer and keyboard player, formerly of the Lost, the Bagatelle, the Grass Menagerie and the Boom Boom Band, before briefly becoming a member of The Velvet Underground, was raised and is based in Gloucester; much of his later work involves collaborations in various media with area's rich arts community
- A. Piatt Andrew, congressman, Assistant Treasury Secretary, and Harvard professor; The Route 128 bridge connecting the island and mainland portions of Gloucester was named after him
- Roger Babson, founder of Babson College and presidential candidate for Prohibition Party in 1940
- Walworth Barbour, diplomat, lived for many years in Gloucester
- Thomas P. Barnett, painter
- Jonathan Bayliss, novelist and playwright
- Cecilia Beaux, painter and society portraitist
- Howard Blackburn, fisherman and adventurer
- Nell Blaine, painter
- Clarence Birdseye, founder of modern frozen food industry
- Kyle Bochniak, MMA Fighter
- Phil Bolger, prolific 20th-century boat designer with 668 designs to his credit, designed Canadian-built tall ship HMS Rose later renamed HMS Surprise for use in Master and Commander: The Far Side of the World
- Hugo Burnham, drummer and founding member of British post-punk band Gang of Four
- Virginia Lee Burton (1909–1968), children's book author and illustrator (The Little House and Mike Mulligan and His Steam Shovel), founder of the Folly Cove Designers group
- Roger Conant, first governor of the Cape Ann colony, moved the colony's center from the Gloucester area to Salem
- Carleton S. Coon, physical anthropologist and president of the American Association of Physical Anthropologists
- Roger Cressey, former member of United States National Security Council, terrorism analyst for NBC News, president of Good Harbor Consulting, and adjunct professor at Georgetown University
- Thomas Dalton, abolitionist leader
- Aristides Demetrios, sculptor, grew up in Gloucester as son of Virginia Lee Burton
- James Elliot, author and United States Representative from Vermont
- Henry Ferrini, critically acclaimed independent filmmaker, nephew of Vincent Ferrini
- Vincent Ferrini, poet, first Poet Laureate of Gloucester
- Thomas Gardner, landed in 1624 at Cape Ann to form colony at what is now known as Gloucester
- Gregory Gibson, author of Goneboy: a Walkabout, Demon of the Waters and Hubert's Freaks
- Raymond Greenleaf, actor
- Emil Gruppe, painter
- John Hays Hammond, Jr., inventor known as "The Father of Radio Control", built Hammond Castle as his home and laboratory
- Halfdan M. Hanson, architect, most noted for collaboration with Henry Davis Sleeper on Beauport, Sleeper-McCann House
- Walker Hancock, sculptor
- Sterling Hayden, actor and writer
- Helen Hayes, actor, spent her summers in Annisquam
- Winslow Homer, landscape painter and printmaker, lived and painted in Gloucester in 1870s
- Israel Horovitz, playwright and father of Adam Horovitz of Beastie Boys
- Alpheus Hyatt, naturalist and paleontologist
- Anna Hyatt Huntington, animalier sculptor and daughter of Alpheus Hyatt
- Elliott Jaques, psychoanalyst, social scientist, known for coining term "mid-life crisis"; moved to Gloucester in 1991 and lived there until death in 2003
- Alfred "Centennial" Johnson, first recorded single-handed crossing of Atlantic Ocean
- Hilton Kramer, art critic and essayist, was born in, and grew up in, Gloucester
- Fitz Henry Lane, Luminist painter, born and lived in Gloucester
- Paul Manship, sculptor
- Stuffy McInnis, Major League Baseball player and manager, Harvard baseball coach
- Laila McQueen, drag queen and makeup artist
- Tony Millionaire, artist and animator best known for comic strip Maakies and Cartoon Network's Drinky Crow Show
- Shawn Milne, Cyclist
- William Monahan, Academy Award-winning screenwriter
- Sun Myung Moon, leader of the Unification Church, spent a great deal of time in Gloucester, and the Unification Church at one time owned a large amount of waterfront property
- Richard Murphy, schooner captain
- John Murray, founder of Universalist denomination in the United States
- Judith Sargent Murray, feminist, essayist, playwright, and poet
- Laura Nyro, singer and songwriter, lived in Gloucester for a number of years
- Charles Olson, Black Mountain College poet
- Kris Osborn, former CNN commentator and current columnist for various military industry blogs
- Mark Parisi, author of syndicated comic strip Off the Mark, was born in Gloucester
- Cy Perkins, Major League Baseball catcher
- Herb Pomeroy, jazz musician, born in Gloucester
- Jessie Ralph, actress
- Marc Randazza, First Amendment lawyer, legal news commentator, columnist (Fox News and CNN)
- Russ Russo, actor
- Daniel Sargent, merchant, politician
- Epes Sargent, editor, poet and playwright
- Henry Sargent, painter and military man
- Paul Dudley Sargent, Revolutionary War hero, one of founding overseers of Bowdoin College
- Winthrop Sargent, patriot, governor, politician, writer; member of Federalist party
- Ben Smith, Olympic ice hockey coach, son of Benjamin A. Smith II, born in Gloucester
- Benjamin A. Smith II, U.S. senator from Massachusetts (1960–1962), Mayor of Gloucester (1954–1955)
- William Stacy (1734–1802), Revolutionary War officer, pioneer to Ohio Country
- Vermin Supreme, performance artist, anarchist, politician, and activist (perennial presidential candidate)
- Martin Weitzman, economist, lived in Gloucester
- Martin Welch, schooner captain, winner of first International Fishing Schooner Championship Races
- Philip Saltonstall Weld, famed sailor and newspaper publisher
- Anna Maria Wells, poet and writer for children
- Alfred J. Wiggin, painter and society portraitist.
- Charles Brenton Fisk, organbuilder
