= Henry Ferrini =

American non-fiction filmmaker (born 1953)

- Born: January 25, 1953 (age 72); Boston, Massachusetts, United States
- Occupation(s): Director, Cameraman, Editor, Producer
- Years active: 1980–present

Henry Ferrini (born 1953, Boston, Massachusetts, United States) is an American non-fiction filmmaker best known for his portraits of Jack Kerouac and Charles Olson.

Ferrini attended Bard College at Simon's Rock in Great Barrington, MA where he studied music. During the administration of President Jimmy Carter under a CETA Grant he learned the craft of filmmaking while making The Light, the Quality, the Time, the Place, a meditation on environmental responsibility. In 1980 he started Ferrini Productions, a film and video production company that produces independent films with grants from cultural agencies and private individuals.

Ferrini has worked as a cinematographer on many independent documentaries. His own films are acknowledged for his painterly eye and his non-linear story-telling style, which focus on the relationship between the artist and their connection to place.

He resides in Gloucester, Massachusetts, with his wife Susan Steiner and their son, Isaac.

== Filmography ==
Poem in Action (1990) Early on Vincent Ferrini (1913–2007) chose poetry as a way of life. Lawrence Ferlinghetti, in "The Sea and Ourselves at Cape Ann," called Vincent, "the conscience of Gloucester." This sixty-minute film poem demonstrates Ferrini's unrelenting commitment to art and life.

Radio Fishtown (1990) From his cramped and lonely studio in Gloucester, Simon Geller ran the only one-man radio station in the country. Narrated by Robert J. Lurtsema, the Boston Globe called Radio Fishtown, "a piece of poetic silver." The film explores the relationship between listeners and a man everyone heard but few ever saw.

Middle Street (1994) is crowded with churches, municipal buildings and funeral parlors. Narrated by Willie Alexander, Middle Street travels over wharves, through religious festivals and into the flicker of home movies to chart a return course to one's youth.

Witch City (1996) Salem, Massachusetts, is a place that exists as both a city and a metaphor. Called, "a tale of two cities" by USA Today the film reveals that commercialism and greed are the new metaphors for a witchcraft business that turns the tragedy of 1692 into the city's meal ticket. A film by Joe Cultrera, Henry Ferrini, John Stanton, Bob Quinn and Phil Lamy.

Lowell Blues (2000) remembers the place Jack Kerouac could not forget. By fusing visual history, language and jazz into a 30-minute film poem, Lowell Blues uses the voices of Robert Creeley, Gregory Corso, David Amram and Johnny Depp to reveal the wonders of Kerouac's childhood holy land.

Last Call: Dreams, Main Street and the Search for Community (2002) Photographed and edited by Ferrini and directed by John Stanton. Last Call takes a personal look at a Nantucket barroom that flourished during the 1960s but did not survive the island's transformation from hardscrabble fishing town into one of the most valuable pieces of real estate in America.

Polis is this (2007) Charles Olson, poet/educator, was the big fire source for a generation of artists and poets. Stan Brakhage, Amiri Baraka and Anne Waldman, to name a few, made pilgrimages to his cold-water flat at 28 Fort Square. The sixty-minute film moves from Massachusetts to Black Mountain College to Cape Ann following Robert Creeley's precept that "Form is never more than an extension of content." The filmmaker and writer Ken Riaf put this idea to good use as the film grows organically out of the content rather than ideas imposed from outside. The film stars John Malkovich, Pete Seeger, Michael Rumaker, John Sinclair, Diane di Prima, Jonathan Williams, Vincent Ferrini, John R. Stilgoe, and Ed Sanders. William Corbett of the Boston Phoenix called Polis is This "the best film about an American poet ever made."
