= Holburn West Parish Church =

Holburn West Church
- 57.1366111°N 2.1248056°W
- Location: 9 Ashley Park Drive, Aberdeen AB10 6RY
- Denomination: Church of Scotland
- Churchmanship: Reformed
- Website: Fountainhall Church

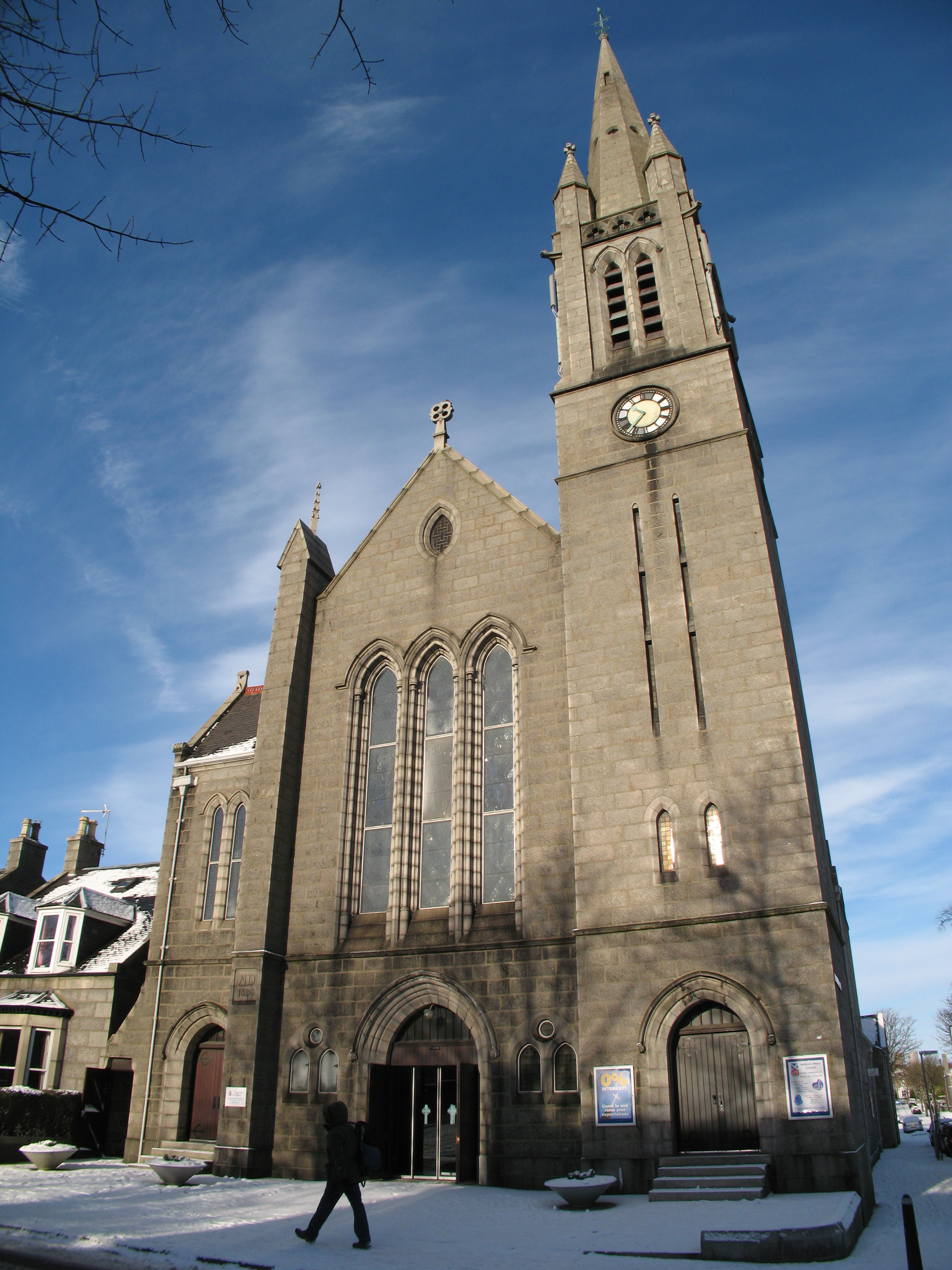
Holburn West Church.jpg

Holburn West Church was a congregation of the Church of Scotland. The Church united with the congregations of Midstocket Church, Queen's Cross Church, Aberdeen and Rubislaw Church to form Fountainhall Church in June 2023.

== Building ==
The building is located at the intersection of Ashley Park Drive and Great Western Road, in the west end of Aberdeen, Scotland. The church building was opened for worship in October 1894. The bell and clock were added in 1895 and built by Gillet & Johnston. The Sanctuary and entrance to the church were refurbished in 2004. The organ was built in 1922, by Abbott and Smith and overhauled in 1974 by N.P. Mander. In the Minute Book of the Deacon's Court of 1905, at the time of a redecoration of the sanctuary, there is mention of "frescoes on the rear and pulpit walls". These are still in place: the Dove of the Holy Spirit and the Burning Bush on the rear wall and a depiction of Jesus washing the disciples' feet and Jesus and the children on the "pulpit" (front) wall. The beautiful memorial window was unveiled and dedicated in 1924, the central light representing the Crucifixion, the left light the Adoration of the Magi, and the right light Christ preaching from the boat. The Communion table and chairs were dedicated in 1925 and the font in 1932.

== History ==
1837 Parish Church established • 1843 became Free Holburn church • 1893 foundation stone laid for present church building • 1901 became Holburn United Free Church • 1929 became Holburn West Church • 1963 large hall added • 2004 sanctuary refurbished

2023 united to form Fountainhall Church

== See also ==
- List of Church of Scotland parishes
