= West Parish Elementary School Science Park =

Interactive community science park in Massachusetts, USA

Coordinates: 42°37′10.3″N 70°42′42.3″W

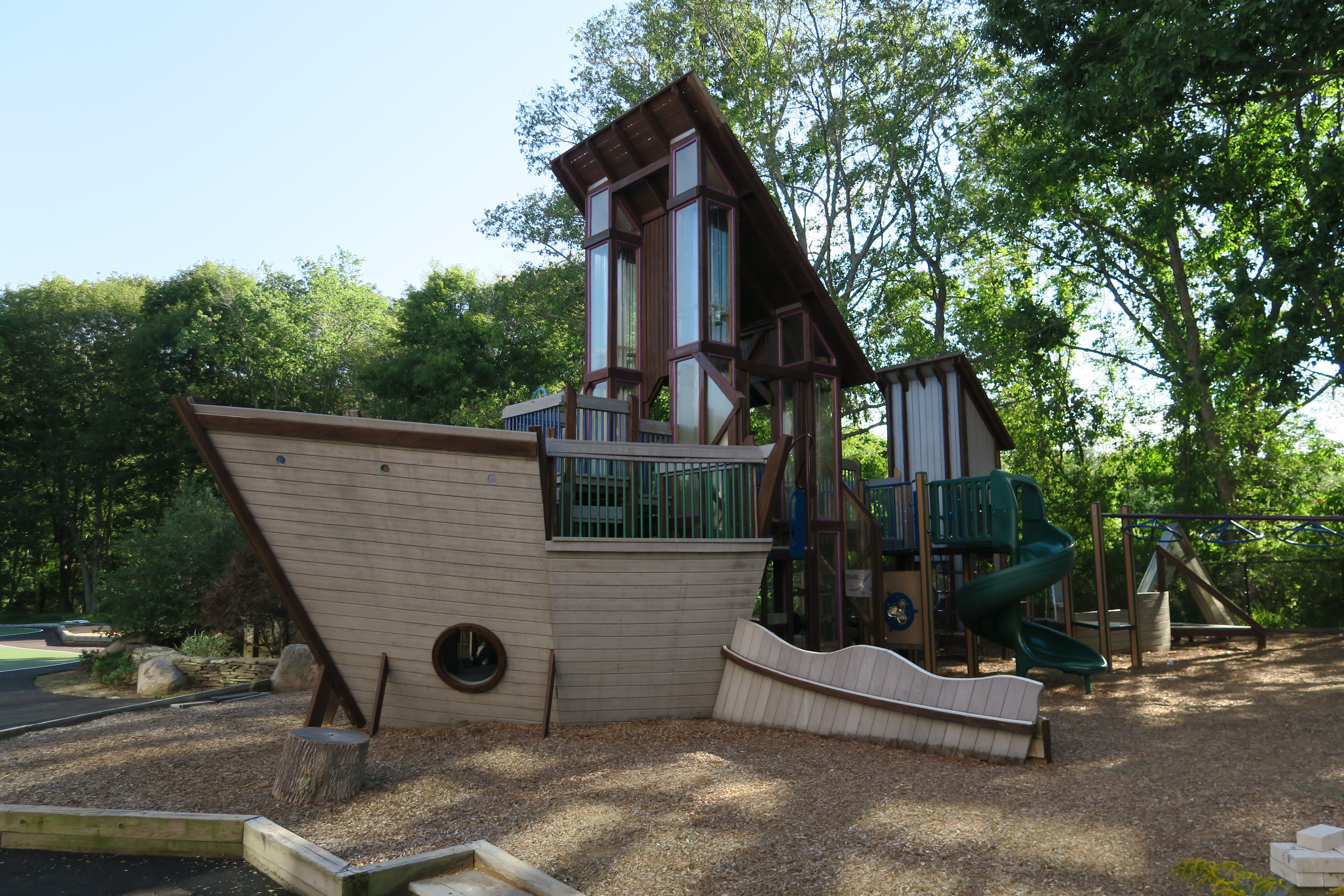

The West Parish Elementary School Science Park is an interactive community science park, one of the first in the US, that is located on the site of the West Parish Elementary School in Gloucester, Massachusetts, USA. It is used as an integral part of the school curriculum.

== Planning and construction ==
The Fund-raising for this 125,000.00 USD Project was funded primarily by grants from the national science foundation and the Massachusetts Institute of Technology (MIT). Additionally the PTO rounded up many direct donations that made this park possible.

Construction of this park took place over a half-year period. The construction of the park was completed primarily by members of the school PTO with some help coming in from various groups. Scientists, including professors at the MIT, were on hand to aid in the design of the project.

== The project ==
The park was first used on the last day of school in 2005. The park contains:

- Surge Swings
- Spring Bridge
- The Air Lifter
- The Foam Lifter
- Fish Runs
- Pulley Systems
- Organ Pipes
