= Polis Is This: Charles Olson and the Persistence of Place =

- Directed by: Henry Ferrini
- Written by: Ken Riaf
- Produced by: Henry Ferrini
- Edited by: Hank Nahamkin
- Distributed by: Ferrini Productions, Inc.
- Release date: April 2007
- Running time: 56 minutes
- Country: United States
- Language: English

Polis Is This: Charles Olson and the Persistence of Place is a 2007 documentary film about the life of the poet Charles Olson produced and directed by independent film-maker, Henry Ferrini. and written by Ken Riaf.

It was called “the best film about an American poet ever made” by William Corbett of the Boston Phoenix. The film was also an Official Selection at the 2007 Berkeley Film and Video Festival.

== Plot ==
Polis Is This is a film that follows the life of the poet Charles Olson. Filmmaker Henry Ferrini uses archival footage of Olson, as well as an array of interview subjects, including actor John Malkovich, to paint a picture of Olson and his life. Throughout the course of the film, Olson struggles to save Gloucester, Massachusetts, his home town, from progress, which in his opinion was taking away the town's very essence. Henry Ferrini is a native of Gloucester himself, and feels the way Olson does about the issues of progress. Polis is This encourages viewers to appreciate where they come from and educates them about the extraordinary possibilities that exist in the ordinary things that exist around them in their daily lives.

Author Jim Harrison has called the film "sublime" and "simply stunning." Russell Banks has called the film "an invaluable contribution to our literature."

== Reception ==
The film, despite having a limited release, has received very positive reviews. The Phoenix of Boston gave it 3.5 out of 4 stars, calling it “the best film about an American Poet ever made.” Ken Hanke of Mountain Xpress gave the film 4 stars, saying it was “extraordinary.”
