= Clementina Tina Chéry =

American peace educator

Chaplain Clementina "Tina" Chéry is the founder of the Louis D. Brown Peace Institute located in Dorchester, Boston. She founded the organization in 1994 after the death of her son to gun violence.

Chéry was born in Honduras. When Chéry was ten years old, she and her mother emigrated to the United States. She lived in Dorchester for the rest of her life. In 1978, she graduated from a high school for young pregnant girls when she was pregnant. Chéry moved to Dahlgreen Street in Boston. In 1988, she married Joseph Chéry.

== Death of Louis Brown ==
On December 20, 1993, Tina's fifteen-year-old son, Louis D. Brown, was murdered in the crossfire of a shoot out. The Mayor of Boston at the time, Thomas M. Menino, visited the home and offered condolences to their family.

A year after Louis' death, Chéry set up the Louis D. Brown Peace Institute out of her home. The first iteration of the institute focused on advocating for restrictions on gun violence. Chéry and her husband created activities which enriched the youth to veer them away from gun violence. Tina Chéry created guides such as Survivors Burial and Resource Guide and Always in My Heart for families through the process of losing someone to gun violence. The Chérys have kept Louis' room as a time capsule.

== Activism and legacy ==
On July 8, 1996, Tina and her husband visited the White House to speak and support Bill Clinton's launch of the Alcohol, Tobacco and Firearms Youth Crime Gun Interdiction Initiative. In 1997, Chéry organized the annual Mother's Day Walk for Peace, a 3.6 mile walk through Dorchester.

In 2013, Tina Chéry received the 3rd Annual Courageous Love Award from First Parish in Cambridge, an organization dedicated to justice and building community in the name of Dr. Martin Luther King Jr. The award acknowledged her work with the Louis D. Brown Peace Institute in helping families who have lost their children due to gun violence.

In 2020, Tina Chéry was Senator Edward J. Markey's guest to the State of Union. In 2021, the Louis D. Brown Peace Institute planned a collaboration with Emerson College and the Center for Gun Violence Prevention at Massachusetts General Hospital. The three-year Boston collaboration aimed to address overlooked narratives of the gun violence crisis, aiming to model a new approach through media, arts, and communication, centering the communities most affected.

Chéry received an honorary doctorate from the College of the Holy Cross in Worcester, Massachusetts in 2012. In 2023, she was recognized as one of "Boston’s most admired, beloved, and successful Black Women leaders" by the Black Women Lead project.
