= Virginia Lee Burton =

American illustrator and children's book author

- Born: August 30, 1909; Newton Centre, Massachusetts, United States
- Died: October 15, 1968 (aged 59); Boston, Massachusetts
- Occupations: Illustrator, writer
- Writing career
- Genre: Children's picture books
- Notable works: The Little House; Mike Mulligan and His Steam Shovel
- Notable awards: Caldecott Medal; 1943

Virginia Lee Burton (August 30, 1909 – October 15, 1968), also known by her married name Virginia Demetrios, was an American illustrator and children's book author. She wrote and illustrated seven children's books, including Mike Mulligan and His Steam Shovel (1939) and The Little House (1943), which won the Caldecott Medal. She also illustrated six books by other authors.

Burton founded the textile collective Folly Cove Designers in Cape Ann, Massachusetts, which had numerous museum exhibitions. Some of its members' works are held today in the collections of Boston's Museum of Fine Arts, the Peabody Essex Museum in Salem, Massachusetts, the Cape Ann Museum, and New York City's Metropolitan Museum of Art.

== Biography ==
=== Early life and education ===
Virginia Burton (Note: Burton added the middle name later on the advice of her High School principal. Cech, John (editor), Dictionary of Literary Biographies: American Writers for Children, 1900-1960, Gale Research, 1983, volume 22, pp. 88.) was born in Newton Centre, Massachusetts. As a child, she was called "Jinnee". Her mother was Lena Yates, a lyric poet and artist from England whose poetry was first published at age 20. Yates later published children's books under the name Lena Dalkeith. Later, she went by the name Jeanne D'Orge. Virginia Burton's father, Alfred Edgar Burton, married Lena Yates after he had been widowed with two sons. Yates was 30 years his junior. They were married in 1906, having met on a walking trip in France. Notably, Burton's father served as the first Dean of Student Affairs for the Massachusetts Institute of Technology (1902-1921).

Burton had an older sister, Christine, and younger brother, Alexander Ross Burton, in addition to their father's first two sons, Harold Hitz Burton and Felix Arnold Burton. She recounted their boisterous holiday celebrations, and singing, dancing and theatrical productions as children. Harold became an attorney, politician and Supreme Court Justice; and Arnold an architect.

When Burton was about 8 years old, her family moved to San Diego, California, as the New England winters were hard on her mother's health. Her father, close to his retirement in 1921 after 40 years at MIT, took a leave of absence. A year later the family settled 450 miles (720 km) north in Carmel-by-the-Sea, then a small, artistic community. Burton and her sister took dance and art lessons, performing in local productions. Her parents divorced in 1925, and her father returned to Boston.

After attending local schools, Burton won a state scholarship to the California School of Fine Arts in San Francisco, where she studied both art and dance. Living in Alameda across the bay while attending art school, she used the long commute by train, ferry boat and cable car "to train myself in making quick sketches from life and from memory of my unaware fellow passengers."

=== Return to East Coast ===
In 1928, after a year at art school, Burton moved to Boston, Massachusetts, where her father was living. It was also closer to her sister, by then a dancer in New York City, who invited Virginia to join her. Their father broke his leg, and Burton stayed in Boston to help him. She found work as a "sketcher" for the Boston Evening Transcript (now defunct). For two-and-a-half years, she worked under its drama and music critic. Portraying actors and other performers, she signed her drawings as "VleeB".

In fall 1930, Burton enrolled in a Saturday morning drawing class taught by sculptor and artist George Demetrios at the Boston Museum School. By spring, Burton and Demetrios artists were married. For a year, the couple lived in Lincoln, where their first son Aristides (called Ari) was born. They moved to the Folly Cove neighborhood of Gloucester. Their second son Michael was born in nearby Groton on Burton's birthday in 1935.

Burton said her first published book, Choo Choo (1935), about an anthropomorphic train engine, reflected strategy she learned from reactions to her first book, which was not published:

My first book, Jonnifer Lint, was about a piece of dust. I and my friends thought it was very clever but thirteen publishers disagreed with us and when I finally got the manuscript back and read it to Aris, age three and a half he went to sleep before I could even finish it. That taught me a lesson and from then on I worked with and for my audience, my own children. I would tell them the story over and over, watching their reaction and adjusting to their interest or lack of interest ... the same with the drawings. Children are very frank critics.

Burton was known for designing the whole work: design, illustration, typeface, and space. She said first she made her drawings or preliminary sketches, then she wrote the story, as it came first to her in images. Her papers include the "numerous preparatory sketches, the reworking of illustrations that had not proven personally satisfactory to [her], and the demands for quality reproduction of the artwork [that] indicate her meticulous attention to detail." Her books were known for their themes of "importance of teamwork, environmental awareness, perseverance, and adapting to change while still recognizing the importance of the past."

In 1941, Burton founded the textile collective, Folly Cove Designers, in Cape Ann, Massachusetts, and designed some of the textiles. Its works were included in arts and crafts exhibitions of the 1940s and 1950s. It reflected the earlier Arts and Crafts Movement of the 19th century, "both in its union of design and production and in the formation as a cooperative guild. The linoleum block print designs for domestic items were innovative and unique, bringing recognition and accolades to the group." The group sold some of their textiles to major retailers such as Lord & Taylor, F. Schumacher, Rich's of Atlanta and Skinner Silks.

The collective had 16 museum exhibitions and some of their works are held in the collections of Boston's Museum of Fine Arts, the Peabody Essex Museum in Salem, and New York City's Metropolitan Museum of Art.

Burton died on October 15, 1968, of lung cancer.

=== Sons ===
Aristides Burton Demetrios was a sculptor of figurative and abstract works, ranging from large public commissions to private pieces for gardens. Aristides died December 12, 2021, in Santa Barbara, California, at the age of 89.

Michael Burton Demetrios was a businessman, leading Marine World Africa in its numerous locations in the United States. Since 1998 he had been president of Intra-Asia, a US company with two amusement parks in China and plans for five additional. Michael died August 5, 2016, in Orlando, Florida.

== Awards and legacy ==
- 1943 Caldecott Medal: The Little House
- Virginia Lee Burton: A Sense of Place (2007), is a documentary film directed by Christine Lundberg and narrated by Lindsay Crouse. It premiered at the Cape Ann Museum on December 8, 2007, and first aired on the Boston PBS station WGBH-TV on December 30, 2007.
- Burton's papers are held by the Free Library of Philadelphia's Children's Literature Research Collection, the University of Oregon, the University of Minnesota.

== Works ==
Houghton Mifflin published the seven books which Burton wrote and illustrated:

- Choo Choo (1937); ISBN 0-395-47942-8
- Mike Mulligan and His Steam Shovel (1939); ISBN 0-590-75803-9
- Calico the Wonder Horse, or the Saga of Stewy Stinker (1941); reissued 1997

Burton said she wrote the comic-strip-format Calico "for both Aris and Mike [her children] in an attempt to wean them away from comic books."

- The Little House (1942); ISBN 0-395-18156-9 —Caldecott Medal winner

Burton said the house of the title "was based on our own little house which we moved from the street into 'a field of daises with apple trees growing around.'"

- Katy and the Big Snow (1943); ISBN 0-395-95991-8

Burton based the book's city of Geoppolis and its highway department on Gloucester.

- Maybelle the Cable Car (1952); 1997 ISBN 0-618-16440-5

Burton said this book reflected "my school days in San Francisco."

- Life Story (1962); 1989 ISBN 978-0395520178

Burton presents the history of the world, from Big Bang to her present day, as a theater production. Updated on 2009.

== Illustrated by Burton ==
- Sad-Faced Boy, by Arna Bontemps (1937); ISBN 0-395-06643-3
- Fast Sooner Hound (1942) by Arna Bontemps and Jack Conroy; 1975 ISBN 0-395-18657-9
- Don Coyote, by Leigh Peck (1942)
- The Song of Robin Hood (1947), stories compiled by Anne Malcolmson, adapted for musical scores by Grace Castagnetta; ISBN 0-618-07186-5
- The Emperor's New Clothes (1949) by Hans Christian Andersen; 1973 ISBN 0-618-34420-9
- La Casita by Burton and Maria Elena Herrera; 1994 ISBN 970-629-050-8

== In popular culture ==
- Cape Ann Historical Association, Folly Cove Designers: a Retrospective, exhibit June 27 through September 7, 1982.
- An animated short film was produced of Mike Mulligan and His Steam Shovel, directed by Michael Sporn, narrated by stand-up comedian Robert Klein and first aired by HBO in 1990.
- Christine Lundberg and Rawn Fulton made a documentary film, Virginia Lee Burton: a Sense of Place (2007), Red Dory Productions (Gloucester, Massachusetts) in partnership with Searchlight Films (Bernardston, Massachusetts).
- Sinikka Nogelo made a documentary film, Folly Cove Designers, produced by WNEC (Gloucester).
- Walt Disney Pictures released a special cartoon of "The Little House" in 1952, directed by Wilfred Jackson, and narrated by voice actor Sterling Holloway.
- Robert J. Bradshaw, Suite No. 3, "Katy and the Big Snow", was commissioned in 2009 by the Cape Ann Symphony, which premiered it that year.
- An animated adaptation of Choo Choo: The Story of a Little Engine Who Ran Away was seen in Shelley Duvall's Bedtime Stories and was narrated by country singer Bonnie Raitt.
