= Michael Sporn =

American animator (1946-2014)

Michael Victor Sporn (April 23, 1946 – January 19, 2014) was an American animator who founded his New York City-based company, Michael Sporn Animation, in 1980, and produced and directed numerous animated TV specials and short spots.

Sporn was nominated for an Oscar in 1984 and an Emmy in 1988 for adaptations of two books by William Steig. His adaptation of the children's book The Man Who Walked Between the Towers (2005) won the Audience Choice Award for Best Short Film at the 2005 Heartland Film Festival, the award for Best Short Animation Made for Children at the 2006 Ottawa International Animation Festival, and was short-listed for an Oscar nomination.

== Early life and education ==
Sporn was born on April 23, 1946, in New York City, and had a sister Patricia (now Scherf). His father, William Sporn, abandoned the family when Michael was a toddler. His mother later remarried. His stepfather, Mario Rosco, wanted to legally adopt Michael. Although Michael considered Mario his father, he refused the adoption because he wanted his biological father to be able to find him. His mother and stepfather had three children together: Christine (now O'Neill), Jerry and John Rosco, his half-siblings. Sporn started drawing cartoons as a child.

He studied fine arts at the New York Institute of Technology. While serving in the United States Navy for five years, he studied animation and drawing by mail. Afterward, in 1972 he started work with animator John Hubley. Next he moved to London to work with Richard Williams. After returning to New York, Sporn founded his own independent studio in 1980, named Michael Sporn Animation.

== Career ==
Sporn produced and directed more than 30 half-hour specials for broadcast outlets HBO, PBS, Showtime and CBS. He created spots & shorts for Sesame Street, PBS stations such as WGBH, Scholastic, syndicated public service announcements such as those featuring Sport Billy and for UNICEF, and also music videos, documentary and film titles and inserts, commercial logos for Random House and industrial spots for companies such as Goodyear.

In creating animation, Sporn always drew by hand. His wife, Heidi Stallings, said, "He felt that the computer was once removed. To him, it was important that there was a transference direct from the artist to the paper."

He produced and directed more than 15 short films, including many for Weston Woods Studios, a company which produces animated shorts of children's books. In 2005 he produced an animated adaptation of Mordicai Gerstein's The Man Who Walked Between the Towers, about Philippe Petit and his 1974 walk between the Twin Towers in New York City. It won the Audience Choice Award for Best Short Film at the 2005 Heartland Film Festival and the award for Best Short Animation Made for Children at the 2006 Ottawa International Animation Festival. It is included as an extra on the DVD of the Oscar-winning documentary Man on Wire (2008), directed by James Marsh, about this exploit.

Also notable is Sporn's 1984 animation of Doctor De Soto by William Steig. The film was nominated in 1984 for the Academy Award for Best Animated Short Film. Also in 1984, Sporn received the CINE Golden Eagle Award in Education for his direction of this animated film. In 1988 Sporn was nominated for an Emmy Award for his TV film adapted from William Steig's Abel's Island.

Sporn worked with many actors and musicians, including Billy Crystal, Ruby Dee, Ossie Davis, Madonna, Prudence Plummer, Christopher Reeve, Susan Sarandon, Eli Wallach, James Earl Jones, John Lithgow, Tim Curry and many others.

Sporn produced, animated or directed many films with messages of social commitment, including the TV special Whitewash and entertaining short films such as Champagne and Morris's Disappearing Bag, alongside HBO Storybook Musicals such as Lyle, Lyle Crocodile, The Story of the Dancing Frog, Ira Sleeps Over, The Marzipan Pig, The Country Mouse and the City Mouse: A Christmas Tale, The Red Shoes (1990), the animated adaptation of the beloved 1939 Virginia Lee Burton book Mike Mulligan and His Steam Shovel and Santa Bear's First Christmas.

In 2011, Sporn created a program for HBO entitled, I Can Be President. Related to the election in 2008 of Barack Obama as the first African-American President of the United States, it explored the dreams and ambitions of children who aspire to that office. I Can Be President was awarded the NAACP Image Award for Outstanding Children's Program in 2011.

== Awards and honors ==
His company's productions received numerous awards, including an Academy Award nomination for his short, Doctor DeSoto, and several Cable ACE Awards for The Story of the Dancing Frog and Ira Sleeps Over. His short film, The Man Who Walked Between the Towers won the 2005 Audience Choice award for Short Film at the Heartland Film Festival in Indianapolis, Indiana, and "Best Short Animation Made for Children" at the 2006 Ottawa International Animation Festival.

The Museum of Modern Art in New York City honored Sporn with a four-day retrospective of his work in 2007.

== Splog ==
His blog "Splog" featured bits of animation art and history mixed with candid opinion.

== Death ==
Sporn died on January 19, 2014, from pancreatic cancer at his birthplace in New York City, aged 67. He was survived by his wife Heidi Stallings, an actress. At the time of his death, Sporn was producing and directing Poe, an animated feature based on the life of Edgar Allan Poe.
