= Folly Cove Designers =

Coordinates: 42°36′53.8″N 70°39′43.4″W

The Folly Cove Designers were a mid-20th-century group of American artists block printing in Gloucester, Massachusetts, on Cape Ann. Their blocks were made of linoleum, and they primarily printed on fabric.

== History of the Folly Cove Designers ==
The Folly Cove Designers grew out of a design course taught by Virginia Lee Burton. She lived at Folly Cove, the most northerly part of the Lanesville neighborhood of Gloucester, Massachusetts. Burton was an accomplished artist in her own right, as well as a talented author and illustrator of several children's books. Her design course at Folly Cove began with a simple agreement she made with her neighbor Aino Clarke. Clarke would teach Burton's two sons the violin, and in exchange, Burton would teach Clarke about the principles of design. Before long, more and more neighbors began to attend each Thursday night, and the group was born. Burton's strength lay in her comprehensive ability to clearly relay a thorough understanding of design and its principles to a group with no prior artistic training or inclination.

Her block printing thesis grew out of the home industries/arts and crafts movements of the past. Apart from design theory, her classes focused on the practicality of hand-producing decorations for the home. The idea of fine art for home use was one of the main factors driving and maintaining the popularity of the movement within the neighborhood. To this end her design course helped members to refine their abilities to see the elements of design in the world around them. Also important was the attention to the craftsmanship of carving the linoleum, and then printing on the fabric itself.

Over time, the small neighborhood classes began to legitimize and take on more of the look and feel of a guild. Upon completion of the course, the graduate was permitted to submit a design to a small jury of designers. Selected designers who had established themselves began to rotate this responsibility starting in 1943. If the design was accepted, then the graduate would carve it into a linoleum block and print it as an official Folly Cove Design.

The design course started in 1938. In 1940 they had their first public exhibition (in the Burton studio). The following year they officially adopted the name "The Folly Cove Designers". Every year they had an opening to present new designs, and everyone enjoyed coffee and nisu (Finnish coffee bread, popular among the largely Finnish population of Lanesville). They established a relationship to wholesale their work to the America House of New York which had been established in 1940 by the American Craftsman Cooperative Council. In 1944 they hired Dorothy Norton as an executive secretary to run the business end of the successful young enterprise. In 1945, Lord and Taylor bought non-exclusive rights to five designs which pushed the reputation of the group, and began some national publicity and diverse commissions for their work.

The Home Industries shop in Rockport, Massachusetts, owned by the Tolfords, sold the Designer's work to the public starting in 1943. It wasn't until 1948 that the Designers opened "The Barn" in Folly Cove as their own summer retail outlet. In the late 1950s they extended the season to ten months. Virginia Lee Burton died in 1968. The following year the group disbanded, ending a period of unique creativity and cooperation. Some Designers were with the group for only a season and others continued with the group for decades. In 1970 the sample books, display hangings and other artifacts from the Folly Cove Designer's Barn were given to the Cape Ann Museum in Gloucester, Massachusetts, which is now the primary source for information about the Folly Cove Designers.
