= Whittemore House (Gloucester, Massachusetts) =

Historic house in Massachusetts, United States

- U.S. National Register of Historic Places
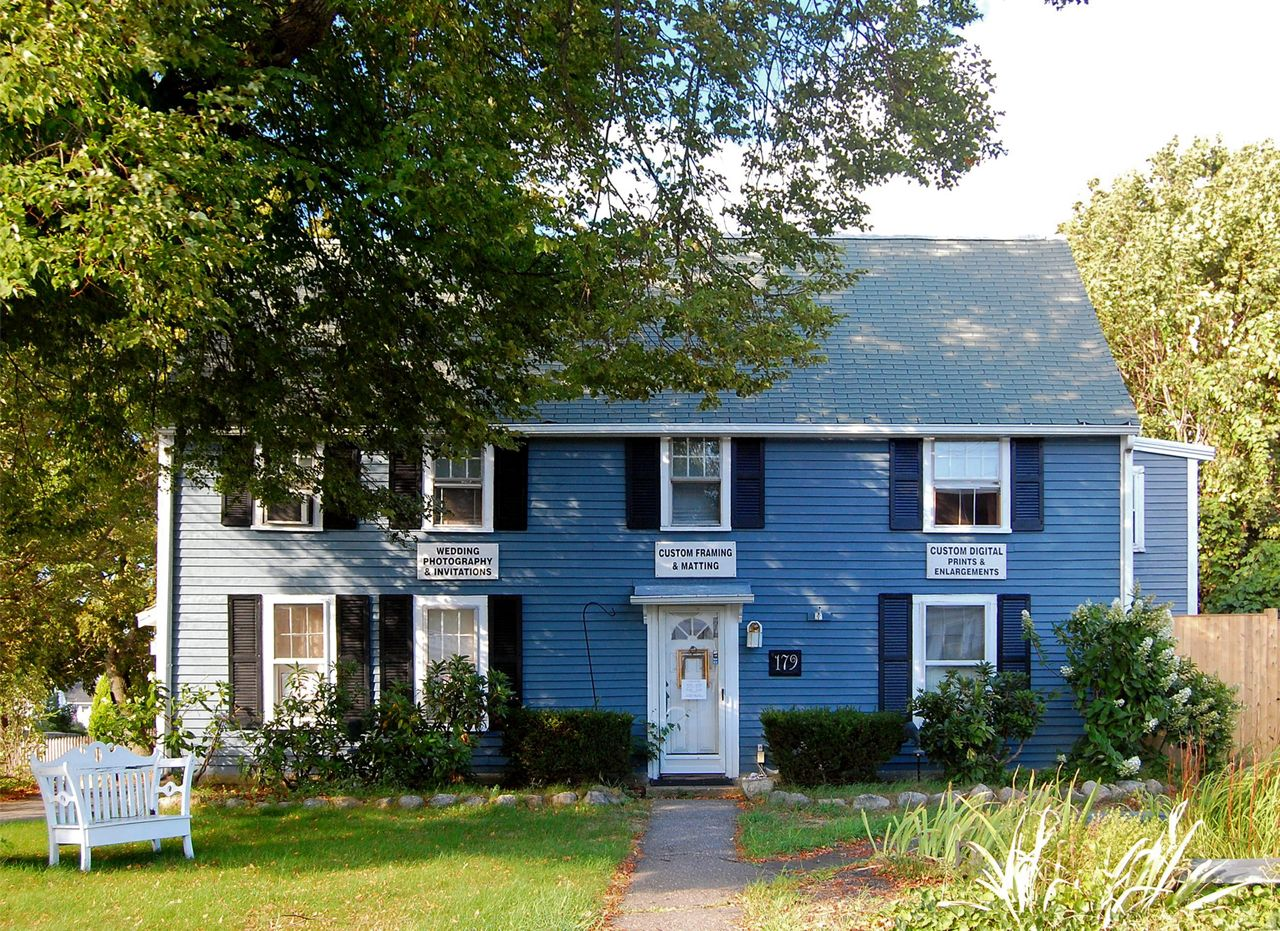

- Location within Massachusetts Location within the United States
- Location: 179 Washington Street, Gloucester, Massachusetts
- Coordinates: 42°37′7″N 70°40′28″W
- Built: 1700
- Architectural style: Colonial
- MPS: First Period Buildings of Eastern Massachusetts TR
- NRHP reference No.: 90000218
- Added to NRHP: March 9, 1990

The Whittemore House is a First Period house in Gloucester, Massachusetts, built around 1700, based on an analysis of its framing and construction methods. It is a two-story wood-frame building with a two-story shed-style addition on the rear, and a single story addition on the right side. When first built, it consisted of two rooms with a chimney on the right; two more rooms were added in the First Period to the right of the chimney, nearly centering it in the house. The original chimney has since been removed.

The house is also notable for its occupation by artist Fitz Hugh Lane, who used the left side room as his studio. The house was added to the National Register of Historic Places in 1990.

== See also ==
- White-Ellery House, another First Period house in Gloucester
- Fitz Hugh Lane House
- National Register of Historic Places listings in Gloucester, Massachusetts
- National Register of Historic Places listings in Essex County, Massachusetts
