= The Little House (picture book) =

1942 picture book by Virginia Lee Burton

- First edition
- Author: Virginia Lee Burton
- Illustrator: Virginia Lee Burton
- Cover artist: Virginia Lee Burton
- Genre: Children's picture book
- Publisher: Houghton Mifflin Harcourt
- Publication date: 1942
- Publication place: United States
- Media type: Hardback
- Pages: 40
- ISBN: 0-395-18156-9
- OCLC: 1347325

The Little House is a 1942 children's picture book written and illustrated by Virginia Lee Burton. Published by Houghton Mifflin, it was the recipient of the Caldecott Medal for illustration in 1943.

== Inspiration ==
Author Virginia Lee Burton has stated that "The Little House was based on our own little house which we moved from the street into a field of daisies with apple trees growing around." Burton denied it was a critique of urban sprawl, claiming instead that she rather wished to convey the passage of time to younger readers. The book is very visually driven; many times Burton changed the amount of text in such a way as to accommodate its illustrations. In her words, "If the page is well drawn and finely designed, the child reader will acquire a sense of good design which will lead to an appreciation of beauty and the development of good taste. Primitive man thought in pictures, not in words, and this visual conception is far more fundamental than its sophisticated translation into verbal modes of thought."

== Story ==
The story centers on a house built at the top of a small hill, far out in the country. Her builder decrees that she "may never be sold for gold or silver", but is built sturdy enough to one day see his great-great-grandchildren's great-great-grandchildren living in her. The house watches the seasons pass, and wonders about the lights of the city, which grow ever closer.

Eventually, a road is built in front of the house. Soon, roadside stands, gas stations, and more small houses begin to appear. Over time, these houses are replaced by tenements and apartment buildings. Streetcars, an elevated railroad, and a subway line are introduced, bringing more activity to the area. Eventually, the apartment buildings and tenements are demolished and replaced by two enormous skyscrapers, one on either side of the house. Now surrounded by a large city, the house feels sad and lonely. It misses its former home on the small hill in the countryside, and its exterior has begun to look shabby.

One day, the great-great-granddaughter of the builder comes by and sees the house, she remembers stories that her grandmother told about living in just such a house, but far out in the country. When the great-great-granddaughter discovers that it is the same house, she arranges to have her moved out of the city, to a hill in the country where she is repaired and can once again watch the seasons pass and live happily ever after.

Though never revealed, it can be assumed that the great-great-granddaughter either moves into the house or sells her to a new family.

== Adaptations ==
The book was also made into a 1952 animated short by Walt Disney, directed by Wilfred Jackson, story adapted by Bill Peet and Bill Cottrell, musical score by Paul J. Smith, and narrated by Sterling Holloway. It has also been released as an audio book. The apartments and skyscrapers from the Disney adaptation of The Little House make a cameo appearance in "Toontown" in Who Framed Roger Rabbit. The Little House has a cameo appearance in the film Chip 'n' Dale: Rescue Rangers, being a house in Chip's neighborhood, looking older, and referred to as "Mrs. House" by Chip.

=== 1952 film ===
The Little House
- Directed by: Wilfred Jackson
- Narrated by: Sterling Holloway
- Production company: Walt Disney Productions
- Release date: August 8, 1952

The story centers on a house built at the top of a small hill, far out in the country, who is delighted when a newlywed couple choose her for a home. However, the house feels lonely at night and wonders what it might be like to have other houses to talk to, often gazing at the lights of the distant city (known as urban sprawl), which can grow even more closer.

Eventually two stately Victorian mansions are built on either side of the Little House. She is happy to have some neighbors at last, but is offended when the mansions rudely look down on her for being inferior. One night, a fire breaks out by unknown cause and both of the mansions burn down to the ground and are destroyed. The Little House considers this a pity, even though they weren't very nice. The cartoon then switches to the late 19th century as a parade of people voting for William McKinley in the presidential election goes by, and the Little House is shown to have had two tall tenement buildings built on either side of her. Sadly, her family moves away to escape all the noise that the residents in both buildings make, but the house reminds herself that come what may, she must stand her ground. Then on December 31 11:59 p.m., men singing "Auld Lang Syne" until at midnight they shouted, "Happy New Year!" as the Little House felt that she could never be happy again. Years pass, and the tenements get demolished to make way for three towering skyscrapers. By this time, the Little House has become battered and worn with age and has begun to long for her old life on the small hill in the countryside.

One day, a wrecking crew comes, presumably to demolish her, but the Little House doesn't mind because she has come to consider herself that she's "just in the way" and "no good to anybody". She also resolves that she should be glad she has lived for as long as she did. Much to her delight, it turns out that they had come to move her out to the country and fix her up so that a new couple can come and live in her.

== Critical reception ==
The book has been noted for its insights on urban sprawl. It won the 1943 Caldecott Medal. It was identified as one of the top 100 best books for children by the National Education Association in 1999 and 2007 polls. It was one of the "Top 100 Picture Books" of all time in a 2012 poll by School Library Journal.

In recent years, the story has drawn criticism as being implicitly anti-urban. As CityLab's Carl Abbott noted in 2017: "Burton lovingly depicted the country setting as islands of meadow and trees that seem to float off the page. In contrast, the scenes of menacing urban growth are drawn with vigor, detail, and darker tones. Apartments and tenements surround the house, complete with rickety back stairways. Pounding traffic pollutes the air, trolleys clank, crowds hurry past, an elevated railway blocks light, and a subway rumbles directly beneath."

== See also ==
- Nail house
- NIMBYism

Awards
Preceded by Make Way for Ducklings	Caldecott Medal recipient 1943	Succeeded by Many Moons
