= Babson-Alling House =

Historic house in Massachusetts, United States

- U.S. National Register of Historic Places
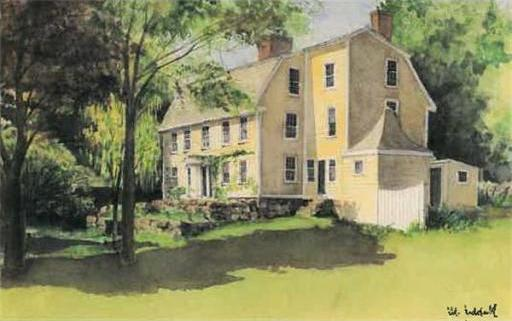
- Painting of Babson-Alling House

- Location within Massachusetts
- Location: 245 Washington Street, Gloucester, Massachusetts
- Coordinates: 42°37′22.89″N 70°40′33.14″W
- Built: 1740
- Architectural style: Georgian
- MPS: Gloucester MPS
- NRHP reference No.: 96000472
- Added to NRHP: April 26, 1996

The Babson-Alling House is a historic colonial house in Gloucester, Massachusetts. The 2.5-story Georgian house was built in 1740 by William Allen, and remains one of Gloucester's finest houses of the period. It is a typical house of the time, with a center chimney plan and a gambrel roof. The house was purchased by Joseph Low in 1779; his daughter Elizabeth married Nathaniel Babson, and their son ultimately inherited the property. It remained in the Babson family into the twentieth century, eventually being inherited by Low descendant Elizabeth Alling.

The house was listed on the National Register of Historic Places in 1996.

== Description, location, and environment ==
The mid-eighteenth-century (1740) Babson-Alling House is one of two early dwellings that remain at Gloucester's original town center. Once known as the Green, the central position of this inland area was usurped in 1738 when the First Parish Meetinghouse was moved eastward to the Inner Harbor, where it remains (see Central Gloucester Historic District, and Boundary Increase). The Green area gradually declined over the next two hundred years until the mid-twentieth century, when the north-shore corridor of Washington Street was “improved” with the Grant Circle Rotary to accommodate traffic from the newly constructed dual-lane State Route 128 (east-west). At that time, the seventeenth-century White-Ellery House (NRHP: 3/9/1990) was moved from its original location, roughly centered on the rotary, to its present position immediately north of the Babson-Alling House. These two well-preserved early dwellings, along with a barn, stone walls, and other landscape features, provide a unique and multifaceted glimpse into the city's origins. The remnant of a ca. 1930 scallop-topped wooden fence was placed on the Babson-Alling property to indicate the early position of Washington Street, but was replaced in April 2018 with a similar fence as a result of a car crashing through in December 2017.

The Babson-Alling House is situated directly on the Grant Circle Rotary at the northeast corner of State Route 128 and Washington Street, where it continues to face south. It is buffered from the intrusion of constant automobile traffic by a tall wooden fence (modern) and a screen of white pines on the west. A large front yard planted with mature weeping willows enhances privacy on the south. The setting of open fields to the north and east is substantially more compatible, providing a sense of the surrounding landscape during the period of significance. To the rear (N) the property abuts the White-Ellery House and an open field that is maintained in rough turf and edged by fieldstone walls and mature oaks. A large untended field provides the eastern border. Poplar Street, which runs behind (N) the two houses, is an early-to-mid-twentieth-century residential neighborhood.

== Summary evolution of the property ==
The handsome and coherent appearance of the Babson-Alling property today results from three major periods of construction and remodeling. The gambrel roof house with its bold modillion cornice and massive central chimney is a product of mid-eighteenth-century Georgian sensibilities. The east wing is either original or an early addition to the main block.

During the Federal period, fashionable entries with delicate fanlights and oval windows were added to the south facade and west elevation. At the same time, it appears that the landscape was enhanced by the creation of a low-rise with a granite retaining wall as a pedestal for the house. In the early twentieth century, ca. 1930, a delicate Federal Revival portico was added to the main entry, and the yard was planted with white pines (W) and weeping willows (S), presumably as screens to increased traffic and encroaching development. At about the same time, a utilitarian board fence along Washington Street was replaced with a more decorative scalloped-top fence, a secondary wall with balustrade was added in front of the foundation, and a gazebo was erected southeast of the house. These complementary building and landscape features create a rich evolutionary overlay that illustrates the continuing history of the property.

== Current appearance of the landscape ==
The main approach to the Babson-Alling House is from Washington Street (W) via an unpaved drive located immediately south of the barn. Leading to the west rear of the house, that drive is lined by a lilac hedge and enclosed by a wooden gate. A longer secondary drive, also unpaved, runs south from Poplar Street behind the White-Ellery House and the barn. The barn is sited between the two houses on the Washington Street (W) side.

The 20,000 sq. ft. lot encompasses several landscape features that appear to have evolved during various periods in the property's history. Like the architectural changes, they are complementary and add substantially to the property's ability to reflect changing fashions and tastes over a two-hundred-year period. They also help to create an oasis of tranquility that contributes to the overall historic integrity of the property, helping to mitigate the intrusiveness of modern traffic patterns.

The house now sits on a low rise defined by a granite block retaining wall, which is a typical Federal period landscape device. The wall is broken in the center to allow three granite block steps to ascend laterally from the west (reoriented ca. 1930); three additional steps lead north to the entry portico. The retaining wall extends eastward beyond the house to a small shingled shed with a pyramidal roof (ca. 1930). A fieldstone wall, which may date to an earlier period, continues eastward from the shed. A split rail fence of unknown date occupies the southeast corner of the front lawn area and extends northward to the stone wall that separates the Babson-Alling property from the Poplar Street field. Directly behind the house, fieldstone is replaced by finished granite blocks which seem to be a mid-to-late nineteenth-century attempt to beautify the area immediately surrounding the house. The large front lawn is planted with mature willows and pines, and overgrown ornamental shrubs.

== Current appearance of the house ==
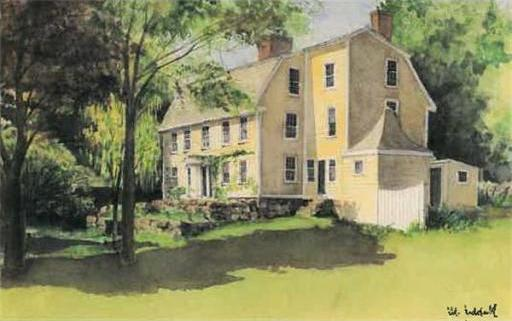
Painting of Babson-Alling House

The five by two bay house rises 2 and 1/2 stories from a high foundation of irregularly sized granite ashlar blocks to an asphalt shingle gambrel roof with a massive center chimney. The main block is extended by an early three-story, three bay east wing that takes the set-back half-depth form that is characteristic of the North Shore and is commonly referred to as a Beverly jog (Old-House Journal). Two small one-story gable roof eels frame the rear elevation. The entire building is sheathed with clapboard which was the original exterior material, although individual elements have probably been replaced over time. The main block is trimmed with narrow cornerboards and watertable, and a handsome, boldly projecting modillion cornice on the front and rear elevations. Unless otherwise noted, windows are simply framed and contain 6/6 sash that date to the Federal Period.

The symmetrical five bay south facade is centered on a well-detailed entry that reflects three compatible periods of development. Historic photographs reveal a surround consisting of paneled pilasters carrying an entablature with a fanlight below. Those extant details probably date to the Federal period occupancy of Nathaniel and Elizabeth Low Babson, and appear to be contemporary with many of the landscape refinements. The present delicate portico, with its swelled roof supported on slender paired Tuscan columns, is a well-conceived Colonial Revival addition dated to the 1930s. The double-lead entry with its raised field panels may be original. Two windows frame the entry on each side while five second-story windows, aligned with the first-story openings, are framed into the cornice.

The two bay west elevation, where the two driveways terminate, is focused on a slightly off-center secondary entry that also appears to date to the Federal period. In this case, the composition consists of an enclosed hip-roof porch detailed with paneled corner pilasters and oval windows on the side walls. The entry, with its six-panel Federal door, is approached by two granite block steps. Two windows are located on the north side of the entry and one on the south. Two windows light both the second and attic stories where their heads are aligned with the main cornice and roof break respectively.

The primary outbuilding is a wood-shingled wood-frame barn sited near Washington Street between the Babson-Alling (SE) and White-Ellery (N) Houses. It rises from a fieldstone and granite block foundation to an asphalt shingle covered gable roof. Built into the side of a small hill, it is one story at the north gable end and two stories at the south. A sliding door is located on the east side, and a similar element has been removed from the south gable end. Loading bays are located in both gables. One window retains a remnant of a 2/2 sash, which would indicate a construction date in the late nineteenth century if it is original.

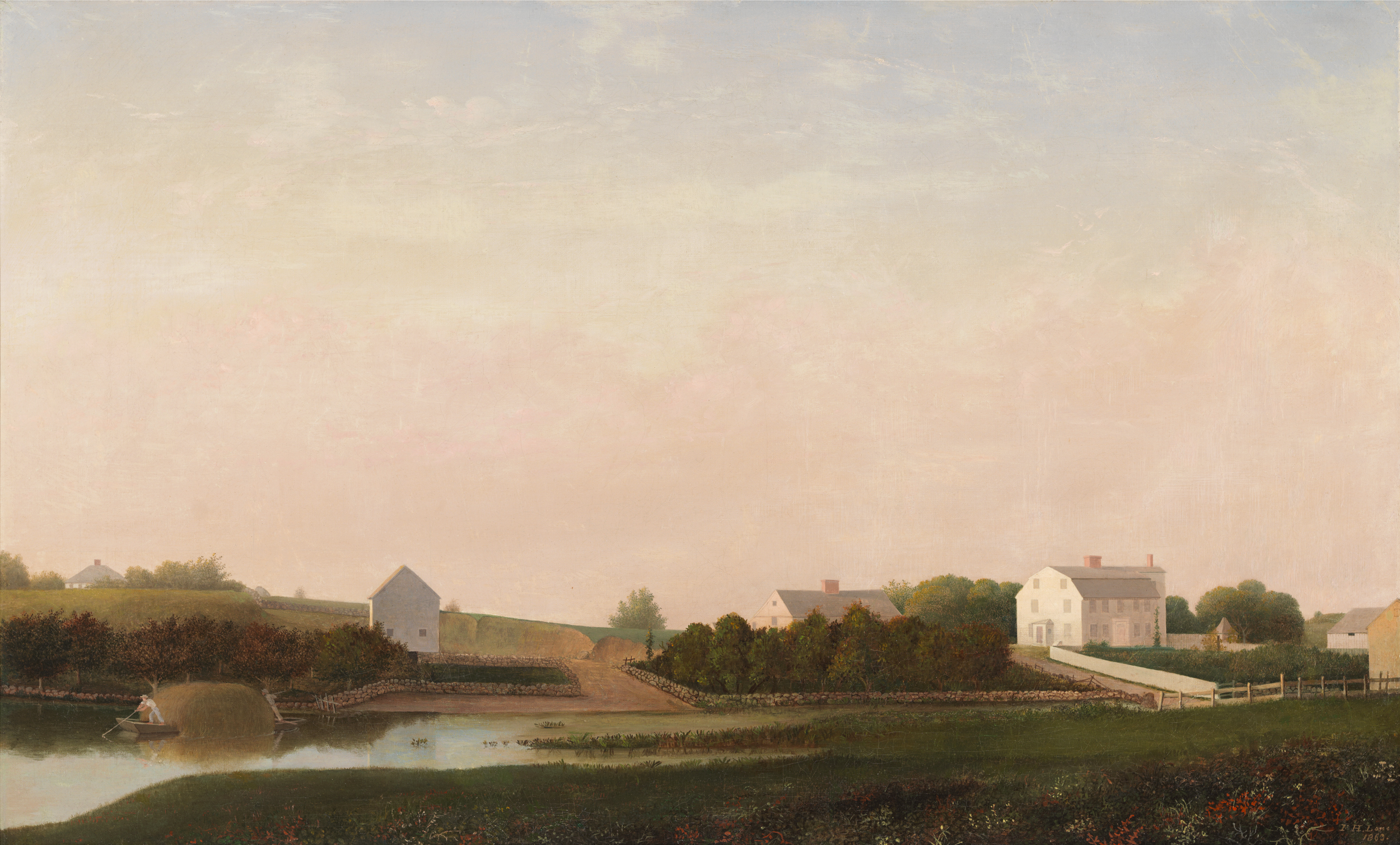
Fitz Henry Lane oil "Babson and Ellery Houses" (1863)

== Archaeological description ==
While no prehistoric sites are currently recorded on the property, it is possible that sites are present. The physical characteristics of the property, including its elevated level to moderately sloping and well-drained location in close proximity to Annisquam River wetlands, indicate favorable locational criteria for Native American subsistence and settlement activities. Four known prehistoric sites are also recorded in the general area (within one mile), all of which border Annisquam River wetlands. Given the above factors, the historic land use of the property, and the small size (20,000 square feet) of the lot, a moderate potential exists for locating significant prehistoric survivals.

There is a high potential for locating significant historic archaeological remains on the property. Structural remains and/or construction features may survive from at least three major periods of construction and remodeling at the house since its construction in ca. 1740. Structural remains from outbuildings are also likely, including barns, wood houses, and storehouses. One barn is still extant between the Babson-Alling and White-Ellery Houses however, at least one other barn, destroyed by fire in 1908, was also present close to the house. Occupational related features (privies, wells) are also likely on the property. nineteenth-century deeds for the house note at least two outhouses no longer extant. Many of the resources described above and other landscape features on the parcel together constitute a mid-nineteenth-century rural landscape preserved on the property.

- Darvill, Timothy, Christopher Gerrard and Bill Startin
  - 1993 Identifying and Protecting Historic Landscapes. Antiquity 67(256): 563-574

== Statement of significance ==
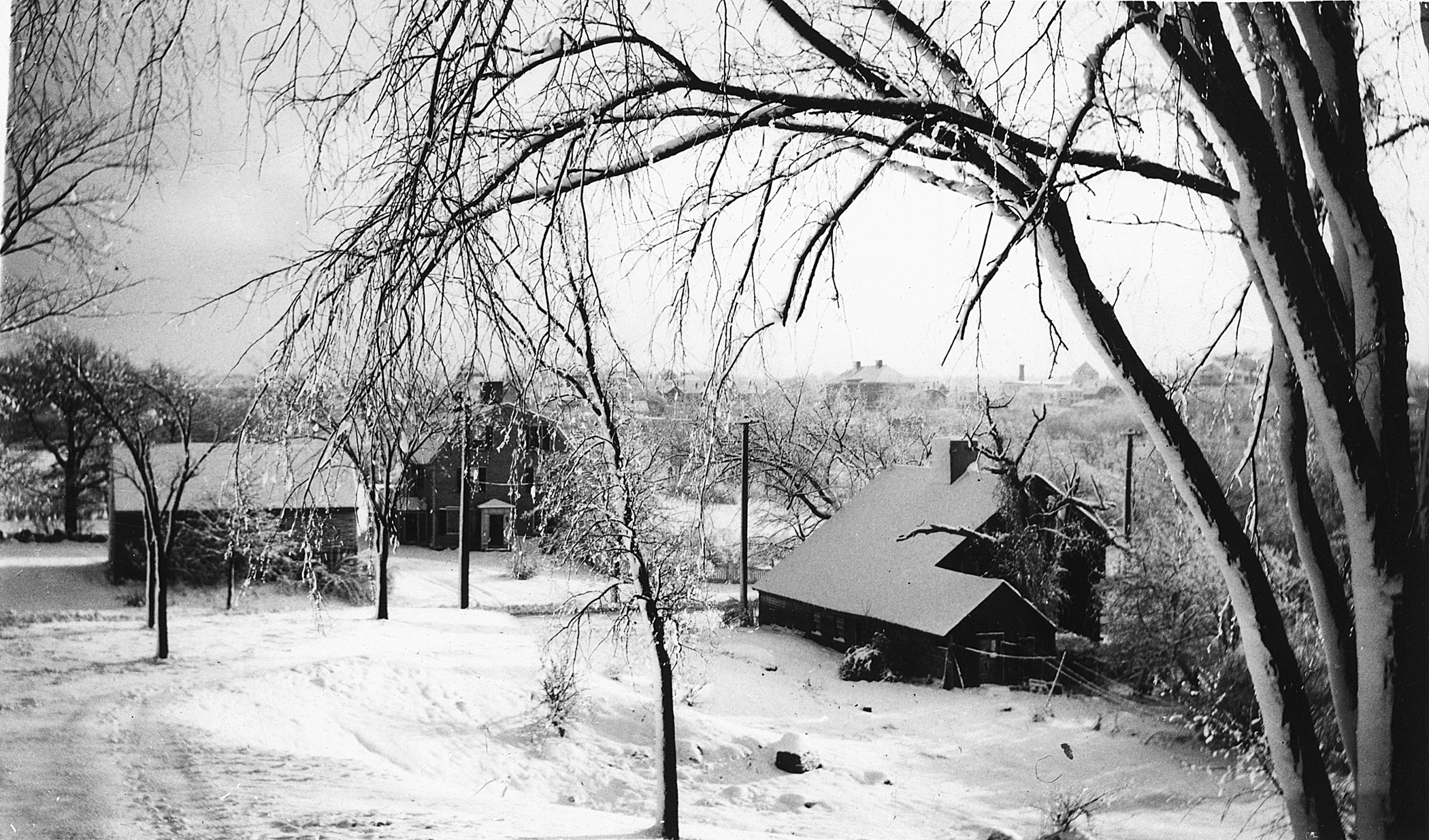
Babson-Alling & White Ellery Houses

Located at Gloucester's original town center, the Babson-Alling House is one of the city's finest examples of mid-Georgian architecture. Historically, the property is associated with some of the city's leading businessmen and their families, and illustrates the changes in Gloucester's maritime industry over the last 250 years.

The Babson-Alling House possesses integrity of location, design, materials, setting, and workmanship, and meets Criteria A and C for listing in the National Register. The period of significance for the property is ca. 1740–1945.

The Babson-Alling House originally stood in a prestigious location on the Town Green, to the east of the original First Parish Meetinghouse. Its construction is generally attributed to either Joseph Allen or his son, William, ca. 1740. Joseph's father, also named Joseph Allen, was a blacksmith who had come to Gloucester in 1674 and settled in the Town Green area. The second Joseph (1681–1750) was “engaged in trade, and became a citizen of considerable distinction, taking an active part in town-affairs;” he also served as a representative to the General Court for four years (Babson: 56). The parcel of land on which the Babson-Alling House now stands was purchased from Stephen Robenson by the second Joseph Allen ca. 1722–35.

Several known deeds document the family's early maritime connections. One, a 1728 deed from Joseph Allen, trader, gives his son Joseph Allen one-third part “of the Good Scooner Called the Grahoune(,) Burthen Aboute Forty tons.” The second, a deed from Joseph Allen, trader, to his son Joseph Allen, “shoresman,” in 1731–32, gives the son use of “My Wharf that I Have Lying in the Harbor Joyning to Phelemon Warners Wharf & the Dock and flats Belonging to Sd. Wharf.” A third deed (dated 1733–34) describes the senior Joseph Allen as a merchant, and his son Joseph as a trader– both terms commonly associated with maritime pursuits during this period.

Little is known of Joseph's son, William Allen, although he presumably continued “in trade” like his father. A reliable local history states that “William, born in 1717, built the large house east of the site of the old Meeting-house in Town (First) Parish, where he had a large family of children born to him… He removed to New Gloucester, Me., on the early settlement of that town,” which began in 1742 (Babson: 56). Another source goes further, stating that “Col. William Allen, who married the daughter of Col. Osgood (Mrs. Mary Osgood of Andover, in 1745), lived in Gloucester during his early married life in a large house up in town… Here was born to him fourteen children. About the year 1769 he removed to New Gloucester,” where two more children were born. He is said to have died in 1780. (CAHA Scrapbook #43: p. 67)

An early map with a list of residents indicates that William Allen was living here by 1741. In 1765 Col. William Allen, with his wife Mary, sold the Babson-Alling property as “the House I now live in with about three acres of Land adjoining to said House… which Land my late Father Joseph Allen Esq. bot of Stephen Robenson,” along with a small wood house and store house between the dwelling and the meeting house, two-thirds of a tract of “Woods Pasture” and “a small Piece of mowing or planting Land” adjoining the Rev. John Roger's house (B. 113, P. 150). “Pens” in the attic are said to have been used by slaves of Col. Allen, who owned eight slaves while living in this house (Robert Babson Alling: 77). The ca. 1740 construction of such a substantial, high style house here is remarkable, since the Town Green was clearly losing its status as the economic, religious, and social center of Gloucester at that time. A new meeting house was built at the Harbor Village in 1738, and the old Green area was relegated from First to Fourth Parish by legislative order in 1742.

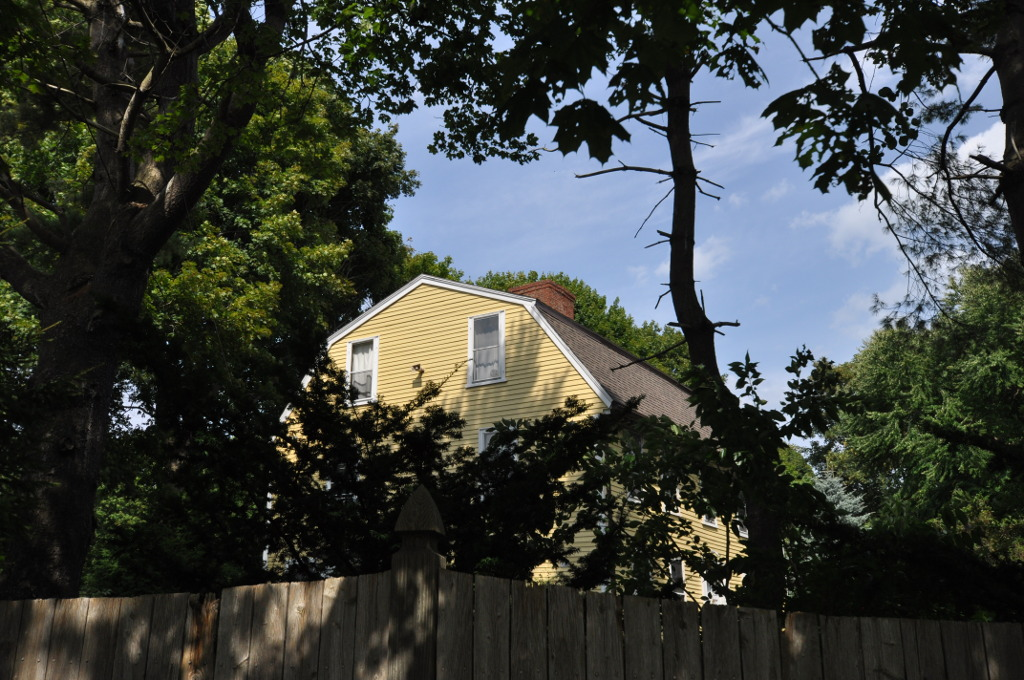
Partial view of the house in 2014

The Babson-Alling House was bought in 1765 by Issac Smith, Esq., of Boston, an eminent merchant in the maritime trades and uncle of Mrs. Abigail Adams (the wife of John Adams, our 2nd President). Mr. Issac Smith was one of the wealthiest men in Boston and the owner of many ships and slaves. Two slaves he received when collecting from a bankrupt merchant further up Washington Street; One of these slaves was named Scipio Dalton, and it is thought he was moved up the street to live in the attic of the Babson-Alling House. Scipio Dalton would later be known from the Indenture between Isaac Smith and Scipio Dalton, (a slave) regarding his freedom, 20 June 1779, with addendum, 20-24 December 1779 (Massachusetts Historical Society) and his life following release.

Issac Smith was very highly regarded, John Hancock called him "the most reliable man in Boston."

"He died in Boston in 1787, aged sixty-eight; having sustained through life a high character for honesty, benevolence, and intelligence." (Babson: 372)

In 1779, Issac and Elizabeth Smith, said to be of Boston, sold the Babson-Alling property—including the house, 3 acres of adjoining land, the wood house and store house, and the mowing or planting lands—to John Low Jr. (1754–1801) of Gloucester. A 1773 graduate of Harvard College, Low was also a merchant, carrying on a fishing business on the Annisquam River.

In 1775 and 1776, John Low Jr. is described as a lieutenant in the militia for the defense of the sea coast. His father, John Sr. (1728–1796) was also engaged in the trade and fishing business on the Annisquam River and became “one of the most prominent citizens of this time” (Babson: 114). Probate records describe John Low Jr. as a merchant and captain. His minor children, Lucy and Eliza, inherited their father's estate, with the Babson-Alling House eventually passing to Eliza Gorham Low (1786–1862). Eliza was married in 1809 to Captain Nathaniel Babson (1784–1836), who came from one of the oldest and most prominent of Gloucester's early families.

Nathaniel Babson was a noted sea captain who made voyages to Scotland, Gibraltar, the Baltic region, and Russia. Among the vessels that he commanded were the sloops Fame and Columbus (the latter of which he was also the owner) and the schooner Charming Nancy. With two of his brothers, Nathaniel also owned the schooner Marion. Several of the letters he wrote to his wife from around the world have been preserved. After Babson retired from the sea, he farmed this estate that his wife had inherited from her father. Outside of his career as a merchant, Nathaniel Babson is also notable as one of the seven founders of the Congregational Church (1829), where he served as a deacon until his death in 1836.

After Eliza Low Babson's death in 1862, the Babson-Alling House passed to their six children, the youngest of whom, Gustavus (1820–1897), bought the property from his siblings and stayed on to work the farm. Although most of his brothers were seafarers like their father, Gustavus became a successful farmer, “blest with rare good judgement and a will to work… who would have made a success of anything he undertook” (Robert Babson Alling: 56–57). At the time that Gustavus Babson bought the estate, it included the same premises purchased by his grandfather, John Low Jr.– comprising a dwelling house and three adjoining acres of land, outhouses, barns, “a wood house or store house,” and other buildings– along with a substantial amount of separate, agricultural land. Gustavus Babson was married in 1845 to his first cousin, Susan Stanwood Low (1820–1880). Her father, David Low, was a brother of John Low Jr. and a shipmaster to Northern Europe. Gustavus and Susan Low Babson had seven children, and the Babson-Alling House continued to pass down through the Babson family through the mid-twentieth century. Its residents included three of Gustavus and Susan's daughters: (1) Susan Babson (1852–1947), a teacher, writer, and active founding members of the Mass. Society for the Prevention of Cruelty to Children and of the Cape Ann Scientific, Literary, and Historical Associate (now the Cape Ann Historical Association); (2) Ann Prentiss Babson Alling (b. 1858), who moved here after the death of her husband in 1894 and shared responsibility for maintaining the homestead with her brother Nathaniel; and (3) Elizabeth Low Babson (1859–1892), an artist and prominent member of the Cape Ann Literary and Historical Associate. Annie Babson Alling's daughter, Elizabeth L. Alling, also remained at the Babson-Alling House and was active in civic affairs.

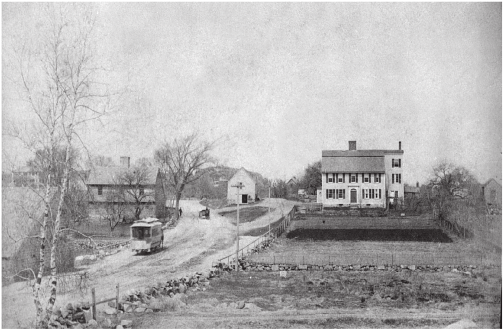
Babson-Alling House 1889 - Joseph Garland "Across Washington Street are two venerable monuments to the carpenter's art. The Babson-Alling House on the right has been here since about 1740, long admired for its solid yet graceful colonial construction and its country garden. Many years ago the cramped "pens" in the attic eaves were shown to me by an Alling descendant claiming the house had been a station on the "Underground Railway" to Canada wherein Northern abolitionists hid escaped slaves from bounty hunters combing the North under authorization of the Fugitive Slave Law, adopted by Congress under Southern pressure, that was a major factor in the Civil War."

The Babson-Alling House is one of Gloucester's best preserved, high-style examples of Georgian architecture, both in its exterior detailing and its interior panelling. The design is particularly notable for its Georgian modillioned cornic, Federal period entryways, and Federal Revival front portico. In 1934, the White Pine “Pencil Point Series”– a major documentary source for Colonial architecture– wrote that the house “contains one of the most beautiful all-paneled rooms in the State (and one of the two still remaining upon Cape Ann) with a most interesting staircase.” (Whitehead, ed.: 162)

Little altered, this sophisticated Georgian building represents a carefully considered architectural evolution through the Colonial Revival period in the early twentieth century. A twentieth-century descendant's account of the homestead speculates that the original house probably had no ells and states that, upon his marriage, Gustavus Babson Sr. added doorways between the front and back of the east end of the house on both floors, and partitioned the large back kitchen. The fireplace in the north kitchen became a parlor, and its large fireplace was reduced in size (Robert Babson Alling: 74).

Of the outbuildings associated with the property, a large barn that was located close to the house was destroyed by fire in 1908. It was occupied by 10 cows, two horses, and a flock of hens (Robert Babson Alling: 78).

The setting for the Babson-Alling House has changed since its days as the town center, with a rotary for state highway Route 128 (built in the 1950s) now loosely substituting for the original town green. The acreage associated with the house has been reduced, but adjacent open fields continue to give an impression reminiscent of its original, semi-rural setting.

== Archaeological significance ==
Since patterns of prehistoric occupation in Gloucester are poorly understood, any surviving sites could be significant. Prehistoric sites in this area can help document the effects of sea level rise on Native American settlement and subsistence through time and the ways in which Native peoples adapted to that change. As a result of the property's location on Cape Ann and its proximity to ocean waters, prehistoric sites in this area may contain valuable information on fishery technologies, particularly towards the exploitation of more open water pelagic species, including whales. Prehistoric sites in this area may also contain data related to prehistoric tool technologies, particularly the extent to which local and regionally important volcanic complexes, including the Lynn Volcanics complex, were utilized on local sites.

Historical archaeological remains described above have the potential to further document Gloucester's original town center, once known as the Green, which currently survives at this and one other location. Controlled testing and excavation can document the eighteenth-through-twentieth-century land use of the property, much of which is no longer extant above ground. Construction features and stratigraphic profiles can further document the phases of construction and remodeling for the house and provide physical evidence of the town center or Green which no longer survives. Detailed analysis of occupational related features can provide important social, cultural, and economic data on inhabitants of the house, including several slaves living there in the eighteenth century. Landscape features can also contribute important information towards the significance of the house. These features are important in interpreting the long-term development of the complex, including its current situation on a busy traffic rotary. A great deal of recent scholarship has focused on archaeological landscapes from a holistic perspective, one that takes into account diachronic landscape change as a factor in the development of layered landscapes (cf. Darvill et al. 1993). Thus in addition to possessing the potential for significant archaeological resources from the eighteenth century, the house and yard can address questions regarding the importance of nineteenth-century landscape and filling as conscious efforts at presentation on the part of the house's occupants.

=== Major bibliographical references ===
- Alling, Robert Babson. Robert Babson Alling's Ancestors, Descendants, and Close Relations. Chicago: Privately printed, 1930 (revised 1959).
- Babson, John J. History of the Town of Gloucester, Cape Ann. Gloucester, Mass.: Peter Smith, 1972.
- Cape Ann Historical Associate. Scrapbook 11 (entitled “Buildings and Houses”): typed manuscript (n.d. or author) entitled “The Babson-Alling House;” Scrapbook, #43 (entitled “Scrap Book A; Old Houses and Landmarks and Obits.”) p. 64, 67, 86
- Cape Ann Historical Associate, Vertical Vile: “Susan Babson;” Vertical File: “Allen-Low Deeds and Papers 1664-1729″
- Cape Ann Historical Associate, typed manuscript referenced as from Elizabeth Alling, “History of CAHA & Babson Alling House,” with Caroline Benham and J.B. Garland <sic>, 3/24/76
- Essex County Registry of Deeds: B. 113, P.150; B.139, P.54; B.679, P.232; et al.
- Finney-MacDougal, Catherine. The Babson Genealogy 1637-1977. Watertown, Mass.: Eaton Press, 1978.
- Gloucester Daily Times, 15 September 1947, obituary of Miss Susan Babson.
- Mass. Historical Commission. Inventory of the Historic Assets of the Commonwealth.
- Hilbert & Woofdord. Gloucester Narrative. 1985. Vital Records to 1849.
- Whitehead, Russell F. editor. The Monograph Series; Records; of Early American Architecture As Source Material. Volume XX, Monographs Four and Five: “The Later Dwelling Architecture of Cape Ann, Parts I and II,” August and October 1934.

== See also ==
- National Register of Historic Places listings in Gloucester, Massachusetts
- National Register of Historic Places listings in Essex County, Massachusetts
