= Song of Robin Hood =

1947 Picture book by Anne Malcolmson

- First edition
- Author: Anne Malcolmson
- Illustrator: Virginia Lee Burton
- Publisher: Houghton, Mifflin, and Company
- Publication date: 1947
- Pages: unpaged
- Awards: Caldecott Honor

Song of Robin Hood is a 1947 picture book compiled by Anne Malcolmson, arranged musically by Grace Castagnetta and illustrated by Virginia Lee Burton. The book collects 18 ballads about Robin Hood. The book was a recipient of a 1948 Caldecott Honor for its illustrations.
