= Escalation of commitment =

Human behavior pattern in which the participant takes on increasing risk

Escalation of commitment is a pattern of decision-making in which individuals or groups continue to invest in a chosen course of action despite mounting evidence that the decision is wrong or that the project is unlikely to succeed. The phenomenon has been studied in organizational behavior, economics, psychology, and sociology. It commonly arises after substantial resources—such as time, money, effort, or reputation—have been invested, and is often described in the research literature as "irrational" because it violates standard cost–benefit reasoning and persists even when superior alternatives are available.

Economists and behavioral scientists use the related term sunk-cost fallacy to describe situations in which past, irrecoverable investments ("sunk costs") are used to justify further investment of money, time, or effort, even when new evidence suggests that continuing will yield worse outcomes than changing course.

In sociology and social psychology, similar patterns are sometimes called irrational escalation of commitment or commitment bias. The underlying idea is captured in expressions such as "If you find yourself in a hole, stop digging" and the warning against "throwing good money after bad". Researchers have also examined the opposite process, de-escalation of commitment, which concerns how individuals and organizations reduce or withdraw support from failing courses of action.

== Early use ==
Escalation of commitment was first described by Barry M. Staw in his 1976 paper, "Knee deep in the big muddy: A study of escalating commitment to a chosen course of action".

Researchers, inspired by the work of Staw, conducted studies that tested factors, situations and causes of escalation of commitment. The research introduced other analyses of situations and how people approach problems and make decisions. Some of the earliest work stemmed from events in which this phenomenon had an effect and help explain the phenomenon.

=== Research and analysis ===
Over the past few decades, researchers have followed and analyzed many examples of the escalation of commitment to a situation. The heightened situations are explained in three elements. Firstly, a situation has a costly amount of resources such as time, money and people invested in the project. Next, past behavior leads up to an apex in time where the project has not met expectations or could be in a cautious state of decline. Lastly, these problems all force a decision-maker to make choices that include the options of continuing to pursue a project until completion by adding additional costs, or canceling the project altogether.

Researchers have also developed an argument regarding how escalation of commitment is observed in two different categories. Many researchers believe that the need to escalate resources is linked to expectancy theory. "According to such a viewpoint, decision makers assess the probability that additional resource allocations will lead to goal attainment, as well as the value of goal attainment (i.e., rewards minus costs), and thereby generate a subjective expected utility associated with the decision to allocate additional resources." The next phase of the escalation process is self-justification and rationalizing if the decision the leader made used resources well, if the resources being used were used to make positive change, and assuring themselves that the decision they chose was right. Leaders must balance costs and benefits of any problem to produce a final decision. What matters most often in assuring the leader that they made the right choice regardless of the outcome is if their decision is what others believed in.

Research conducted on the topic has been taken from many other forms and theories of psychology. Many believe that what researchers have done thus far to explain this behavior is best analyzed and tested through situational development and resource allocation.

Other research has identified circumstances that lead to the opposite of escalation of commitment, namely deescalation of commitment. This research explains the factors that influence whether escalation or deescalation of commitment is more likely to occur through the role of budgeting and mental accounting.

=== Vietnam War ===
Escalation of commitment can many times cause behavior change by means of locking into resources. In 1965, U.S. diplomat George Ball wrote to President Lyndon Johnson explaining that the South Vietnamese were losing the war, facing the United States with a decision between limiting U.S. liabilities by finding a way out at minimal long-term costs or, alternatively, accepting an open-ended commitment of U.S. forces:

The decision you face now is crucial. Once large numbers of U.S. troops are committed to direct combat, they will begin to take heavy casualties in a war they are ill equipped to fight in a noncooperative if not downright hostile countryside. Once we suffer large casualties, we will have started a well-nigh irreversible process. Our involvement will be so great that we cannot—without national humiliation—stop short of achieving our complete objectives. Of the two possibilities, I think humiliation would be more likely than the achievement of our objectives—even after we have paid terrible costs.

== Theories ==
=== Self-justification theory ===
Self-justification thought process is a part of commitment decisions of leaders and managers of a group and can therefore cause a rise in commitment levels. This attitude provides "one explanation for why people escalate commitment to their past investments." Managers make decisions that reflect previous behavior. Managers tend to recall and follow information that is aligned to their behavior to create consistency for their current and future decisions. If a group member or outside party recognizes inconsistent decision making, this can alter the leadership role of the manager. Managers have external influence from society, peers, and authority, which can significantly alter a manager's perception on what factors realistically matter when making decisions.

=== Prospect theory ===
Prospect theory helps to describe the natural reactions and processes involved in making a decision in a risk-taking situation. Prospect theory makes the argument for how levels of wealth, whether that is people, money, or time, affect how a decision is made. Researchers were particularly interested in how one perceives a situation based on costs and benefits. The framing to how the problem is introduced is crucial for understanding and thinking of the probability that the situation will either work in favor or against you and how to prepare for those changes. "Whyte (1986) argued that prospect theory provides the psychological mechanism by which to explain escalating commitment to a failing course of action without the need to invoke self-justification processes. (Fiegenbaum & Thomas, 1988: 99)" Prospect theorists believe that one's use of this process is when there is a negative downfall in the stakes that will affect the outcome of the project. To ensure they will not fail, the individual may add more resources to assure them that they will succeed. Although this theory seems realistic, researchers "Davis and Bobko (1986) found no effect of personal responsibility on continued commitment to the previous course of action in the positive frame condition." Which means that escalation of commitment will be lower in the higher responsibility situation.

=== Attribution theory ===
The attribution theory, originating from Fritz Heider, "attempts to find causal explanations for events and human behaviors." This theory approaches two methods of inquiry including locus of causality and stability. Locus of causality reflects on internal characteristics of an individual, such as intelligence levels and attention seeking, with the relationship of the external space such as weather forecasts and task difficulty. Aspects of control become a significant factor in how a manager justifies a decision made. Managers will use the relationship between internal and external factors to describe why they made a decision to a single point of view. Managers may justify their actions by explaining that this was out of their personal control of the event, or they could believe that the decision could not be controlled by anyone else. Research suggests that "the type of attribution made by an employee across these dimensions is likely to impact an employee's tendency to engage in the negative emotional activity referred to as escalation of commitment."

=== Social identity theory ===
Identity is a large part of how we move through the world. Private thoughts and opinions as well as the effect of others create the social identity theory. People make connections between their use of groups and their own view of themselves, which researchers have discovered motivates people to keep their social status and to defend it whenever it is endangered.

=== Theoretical models ===
==== Temporal model of escalation ====
Groups engage in temporal comparisons, which means that you compare actions and behaviors at "different points in time." This is a form of social identity scenario. This type of comparison can be made when a decision seems unproductive and forces team members to consider any threat to the group.

==== Aggregate model ====
"The aggregate model's emphasis is upon the accumulation and balance of forces rather than the ordering of effects over time." The model is general and can provide an ideal view as to how the effects whether positive or negative are defined by micro and macro forces. This model goes by situation rather than what researchers have defined as the norm. There is no process to follow, which makes it very useful for researchers because they can understand a situation more clearly as well as see the bigger picture of the situation.

== Determinants ==
The main drivers of the tendency to continue investing in losing propositions are project, psychological, social, and structural.

=== Project ===
Project determinants are those that refer to the original commitments and decisions made at a project's beginning. This includes general project characteristics and initial financial costs. Among them, decision risk, opportunity cost information, and information acquisition have been found to have negative relationships with escalation of commitment. Decision uncertainty, positive performance trend information, and expressed preference for initial decision have been found to have positive relationships.

High costs of ending a project or changing its course, potential financial gain upon completion, and extensive structure can factor in to escalation of commitment, making it difficult to walk away from the project. Preventing future monetary loss, potential savings, and having clearly available alternatives can allow for avoidance of the behavior. In studies by Teger and later Ross and Staw, situations where ending an action costs more than completing it resulted in decision makers being trapped in their current, costly behaviors.

=== Psychological ===
Psychological determinants are those that refer to internal views on the actions and information involved in a project. This can include cognitive factors, personality, and emotions as they relate to project elements. Of these, sunk costs, time investment, decision maker experience and expertise, self-efficacy and confidence, personal responsibility for the initial decision, ego threat, and proximity to project completion have been found to have positive relationships with escalation of commitment, while anticipated regret and positive information framing have been found to have negative relationships.

Optimism and belief that one has control over what will still be positive outcomes lead to continued self-justification of commitment to actions. People add to their initial personal investments in the hope they will overcome currently negative results. This was illustrated in a case study by Staw, where providing business students with manipulated responsibilities for initial decisions and their outcomes resulted in the greatest commitment to increased actions and resources when the initial decision assigned was made directly by the student with poor outcomes. In these instances, people take further risk in an attempt to avoid further problems. This is even more likely when subjects view current issues as having unstable reasoning rather than stable reasoning, or when the individual is unwilling to admit mistakes. They then believe the situation will stabilize or turn around. Confirmation bias can also lead to escalation of commitment as individuals are then less likely to recognize the negative results of their decisions. On the other hand, if the results are recognized, they can be blamed on unforeseeable events occurring during the course of the project.

The effect of sunk costs is often seen escalating commitment. When the amount of investment is greater and can not be recovered, the desire to avoid complete loss of those resources and keeping with impression management prompts continued investment over pulling out. Relatedly, as invested resources can include time, closeness to completion of a project yields similar results. More value is placed on project when they are early or late in their process due to the clarity of completion goals at those points. It's more likely that risks will be taken at these points than in a project closer to a visible midpoint.

=== Social ===
Social determinants are those that refer to the expectations and influence of other individuals or groups on project actions. Included in these, group identity or cohesive strength has been found to have the most influence on escalation of commitment while public evaluation of decision and resistance to decision from others has little significance in relation.

=== Structural ===
Structural determinants are those that refer to the cultural and environmental features and resources of the project's overall organization. The minimal research available on them indicates that agency problems most influence escalation of commitment.

There are macro-level variables that affect the organizational structure of a team and how they make decisions. Decisions are made based on individuals in a group setting with specific roles and responsibilities and effect decisions that are a product of interaction in the team. The determinant that affects escalation of commitment is institutional inertia. This phenomenon is used to describe how individual attitudes and behavior changes frequently, so therefore, a group's stature is also unpredictable and controllable. "Organizations have very imperfect sensory systems, making them relatively impervious to changes in their environments."

This is one factor that plays a role in how issues are addressed. When there are a group of individuals involved in communication, decisions, and change, with the lack of consistency in the group, most of the tasks fail to complete. This phenomenon occurs in situations such as policy change, rulings and procedures.

This issue can also cause havoc for an organization when they are too attached to a policy, thought process or identity because they are not free to change. "On occasion, a project, product, or policy can become so closely tied to the values and purposes of the organization that it becomes almost unthinkable to consider withdrawal." One primary example of this phenomenon is the downfall of the Pan American World Airways company, commonly known as Pan Am. Pan Am was a well known airlines and hotel with hundreds of employees. With the turn of industry, airline policies were deregulated and caused financial downfall for Pan Am. The company over time made cuts to their company to stay afloat. The company believed that their image of being an airline was more important than being a successful company, so much so that they removed all of the assets that were in fact making them the largest amount of revenue only to save the image they thought they needed to remain to be Pan Am.

== Groups vs individuals ==
In groups, it can be more difficult to attribute issues to a single, simpler determinant. While determinants are still applicable, oftentimes there are more complex factors when organizational goals and actions misalign. Groups, especially as they grow larger, can be resistant to changing course.

Even if the need to change course or cease action is recognized, communication speed, policies, and business politics can be hindrances. A larger organization, especially one with a spread of subgroups, has to communicate the argument and decision to go against previous actions across the appropriate levels. If this communication does not occur in a timely manner or is blocked, the final decision may not be made and acted upon. A decision that goes against existing rules and processes may also reach resistance even with support from those within the organization. Individuals and groups that are directly employed due to a project, have financial stake in it may provide enough opposition to prevent changes from being made as well. They feel personally responsible for the parts they've worked on and can also feel that they too are being replaced or terminated. Escalation of commitment can then occur in any of these situations. External groups can play an even larger part in escalating commitment if their power is greater than that of the group taking action and they use that power to directly lead and influence.

With a larger number of decision makers included, groups have the opportunity for greater productivity than single individuals, but they also have the opportunity for greater losses and escalation. Members can eliminate some of the escalation potential if they come to a better decision earlier on in the process and avoid the need to change course dramatically. Yet they can also hold onto a larger base of support for their initial actions to the point where escalation potential is increased. In this case, groupthink assists in keeping with the original decision and pressures towards conformity rather than dividing the group with other options. Also, a group whose members are not cohesive can have decreased escalation potential due to conflicts and varying levels of inclusion in the process.

Organizations that are family businesses are especially prone to escalation of commitment due to the added level of going through the family structure in addition to the business structure, allowing for further conflicts between the two. Business reputation, customer and share loss, and financial loss become risks.

== Examples ==
- SoftBank Group's spending billions in an investment rescue package for troubled company WeWork during 2019.
- The dollar auction is a thought exercise demonstrating the concept.
- After a heated and aggressive bidding war, property developer Robert Campeau ended up buying Bloomingdale's for an estimated $600 million more than it was worth. In 1992, The Wall Street Journal wrote regarding the bidding war that "we're not dealing in price anymore but egos." Campeau was forced to declare bankruptcy soon afterwards, in what was then the costliest personal bankruptcy in the US.
- Certain fraud schemes exploit this behaviour, such as the Nigerian 419 Scam, where victims continue to spend money for alleged business deals, although the fraudulent character of the deal appears obvious to uninvolved people.
- The Big Dig, a costly construction project in Boston
- Shoreham Nuclear Power Plant
- Taurus IT Project
- AIG Government Assistance
- 30–40% of software projects experience escalation of commitment due to their complexity and uncertainty. Intangibility makes determining the current status of projects especially difficult.
- Denver International Airport's baggage handling system that was 2 years and $2 billion over budget in the 1990s
- Congress and advocacy group support and investment in the 21st Century Community Learning Center, which has been found to fail to meet its goals
- Continued funding for the Drug Abuse Resistance Education Program for school children, which research showed doesn't lead to a meaningful decrease in drug use
- The construction of Berlin Brandenburg Airport, which as of 2019 was €6.5 billion over budget and 10 years behind schedule. Until it was fully opened in November 2020, politicians and economists had raised doubts that the airport could ever be opened, while at the same time the project had been described as "too expensive to fail".
- The Concorde project
- Construction of the Channel tunnel
- Construction of the American Dream Meadowlands complex in New Jersey, a project started in 2003 under the name Xanadu, plagued by financial and legal hurdles and numerous construction delays

== See also ==
- Brinkmanship – Political and military tactic
- Confirmation bias – Bias confirming existing attitudes
- Conflict escalation – Concept in conflict studies
- Cost overrun – Unexpected incurred costs in excess of budgeted amounts
- Law of holes – Adage
- Pivoting – Early business development tool
- Loss aversion – Aspect of decision and prospect theories
- Martingale (betting system) – Gambling strategy where the amount is raised until a person wins or becomes insolvent
- Mission creep – Expansion of a project beyond its initial goals
- Planck's principle – Principle that scientific change is generational
- Replication crisis – Observed inability to reproduce scientific studies
- Sunk cost – Cost that has already been incurred and cannot be recovered
- True-believer syndrome – Continued belief in a debunked theory
