= White–Ellery House =

Historic house in Massachusetts, United States

- U.S. National Register of Historic Places
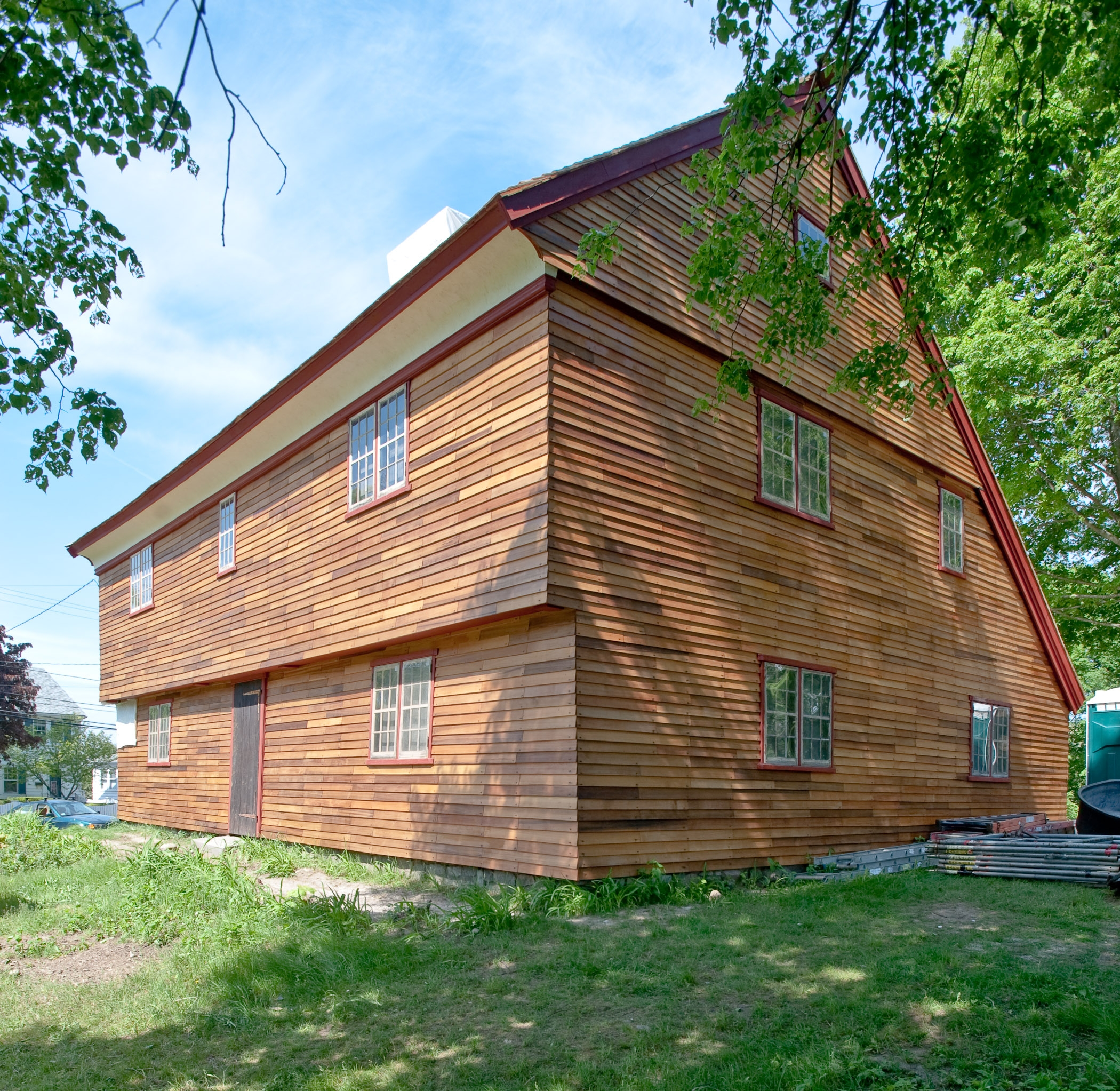
- White Ellery House, 2009
- Location: Gloucester, Massachusetts
- Coordinates: 42°37′23″N 70°40′34″W
- Built: 1710
- Architectural style: Colonial
- MPS: First Period Buildings of Eastern Massachusetts TR
- NRHP reference No.: 90000216
- Added to NRHP: March 9, 1990

The White–Ellery House is a historic house located at 247 Washington Street in Gloucester, Massachusetts, United States. It is on the National Register of Historic Places. It is owned and operated by the Cape Ann Museum, whose headquarters is located at 27 Pleasant Street in Gloucester.

== History ==
The White–Ellery House was erected in 1710 upon what was then the Town green of Gloucester. It was built at the edge of a marsh for Gloucester's first settled minister, the Reverend John White (1677–1760). In keeping with White's esteemed position in the community, the House exhibits a certain elegance and refinement, perhaps best reflected in the surviving interior details.

In 1735, the house was purchased by James Stevens and kept as a tavern, sometimes serving as a meeting place for the town's selectmen. In 1740, Captain William Ellery (1693–1771) took title to the property. Ellery, who was almost 50 years old, had just married for the second time and after keeping the tavern in operation for a few years, used the house as a home for his growing family. Ellery was a slave ship captain, notably navigating the slave ship Jenny in 1758 on behalf of Merchant Timothy Fitch. Ellery also navigated the snow (type of ship) Caesar on behalf of Fitch

Over the next 200 years, six generations of the Ellery family lived in the house.

In 1947 the structure was moved approximately 100 yards from its original location, roughly centered on the rotary, to its present position immediately north of the Babson-Alling house to make room for Route 128. Although the center of Gloucester long ago moved from the Town Green to the Harbor Village, the site remains the entrance to Gloucester and an important historical site.

== Architecture ==
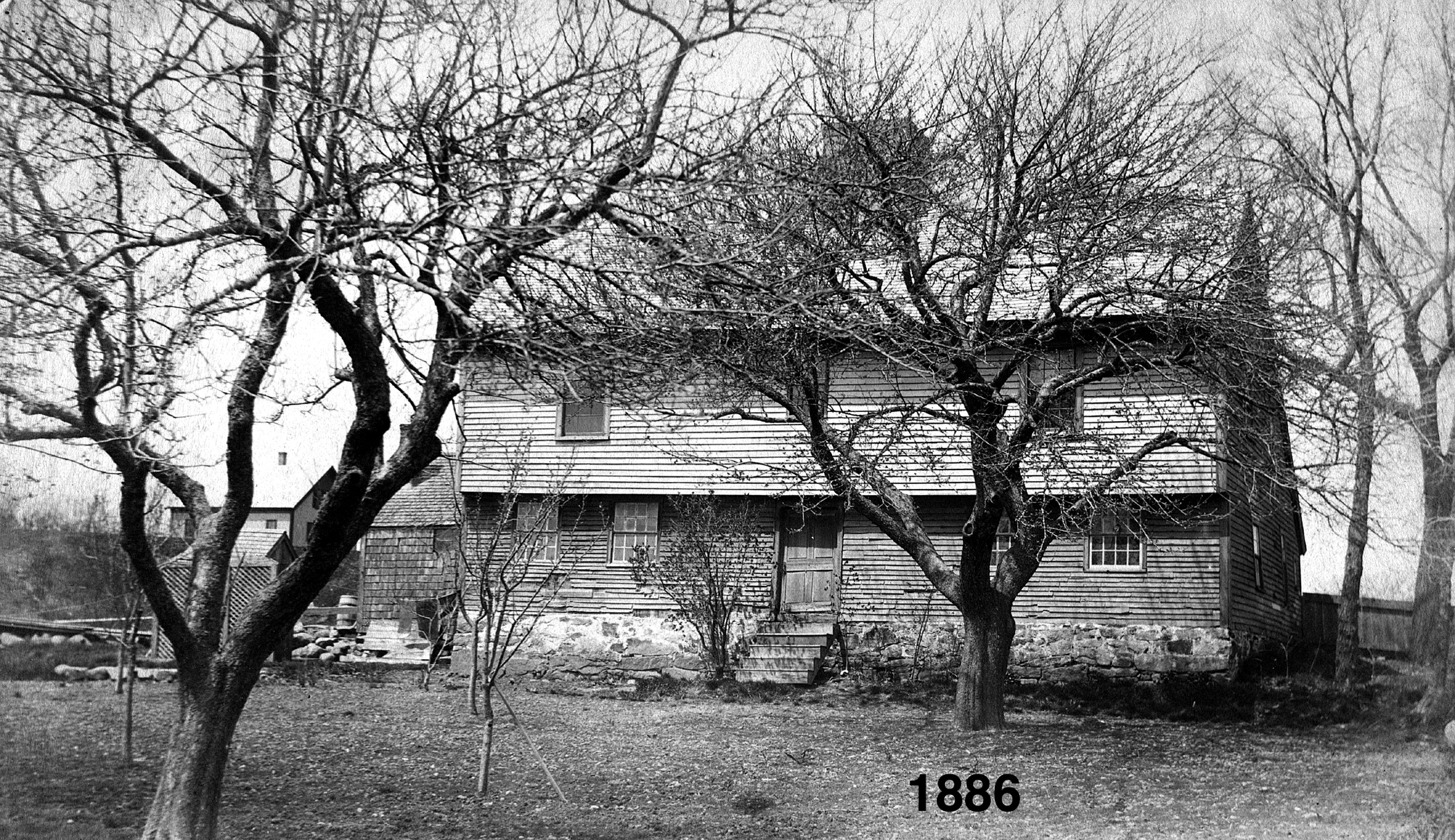
White–Ellery House, 1886

The White–Ellery House is one of just a few hundred First Period (c. 1620–1725) houses in eastern Massachusetts. It is a 2 ½ story "saltbox" structure with a central chimney that once serviced six fireplaces. The building has vertical plank frame construction with an integral lean-to roof. There is a framed overhang on the front façade, and rare examples of raised-field paneled doors between rooms on the first floor. The Renaissance-inspired architectural features illustrate the transition from European building traditions to early American ones. Inside there are several examples of early decorative detail, including three different examples of painted wall decoration, elaborate chamfering (decorative plane work) on ceiling beams, and one of the most highly developed front staircases of the period in eastern Massachusetts.

== Tourism ==
The structure of the house has remained relatively unchanged throughout its 300-year history. Due to the recent initiative of the Cape Ann Museum, efforts have been made to restore the building and open it to the public. The White–Ellery house offers a chance for members of the Gloucester community and visitors to Cape Ann to learn about the history of the area. The building is a source of pride to the city that is now being shared with the public the first Saturdays of the summer months when local artists will display one-day installations (schedule below).

- June 6: Rose-Marie Glen & Juni Van Dyke
- July 11: Joy Halsted
- August 1: Sarah Hollis Perry
- September 5: Chris Williams

The house is located at 247 Washington Street at the corner of Poplar Street, Gloucester. Parking is available behind the house.

== Gallery ==
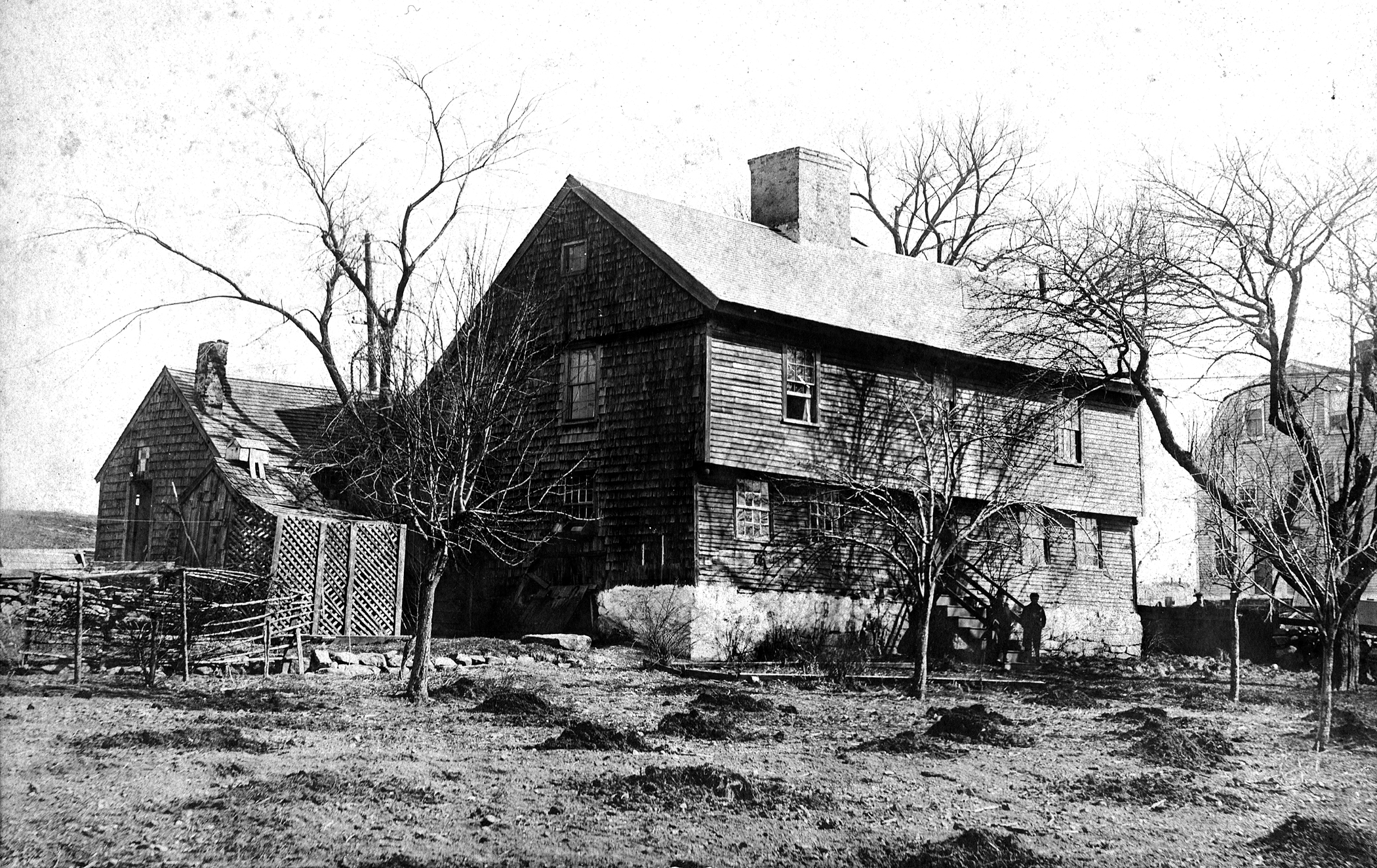
White–Ellery House, c. 1880

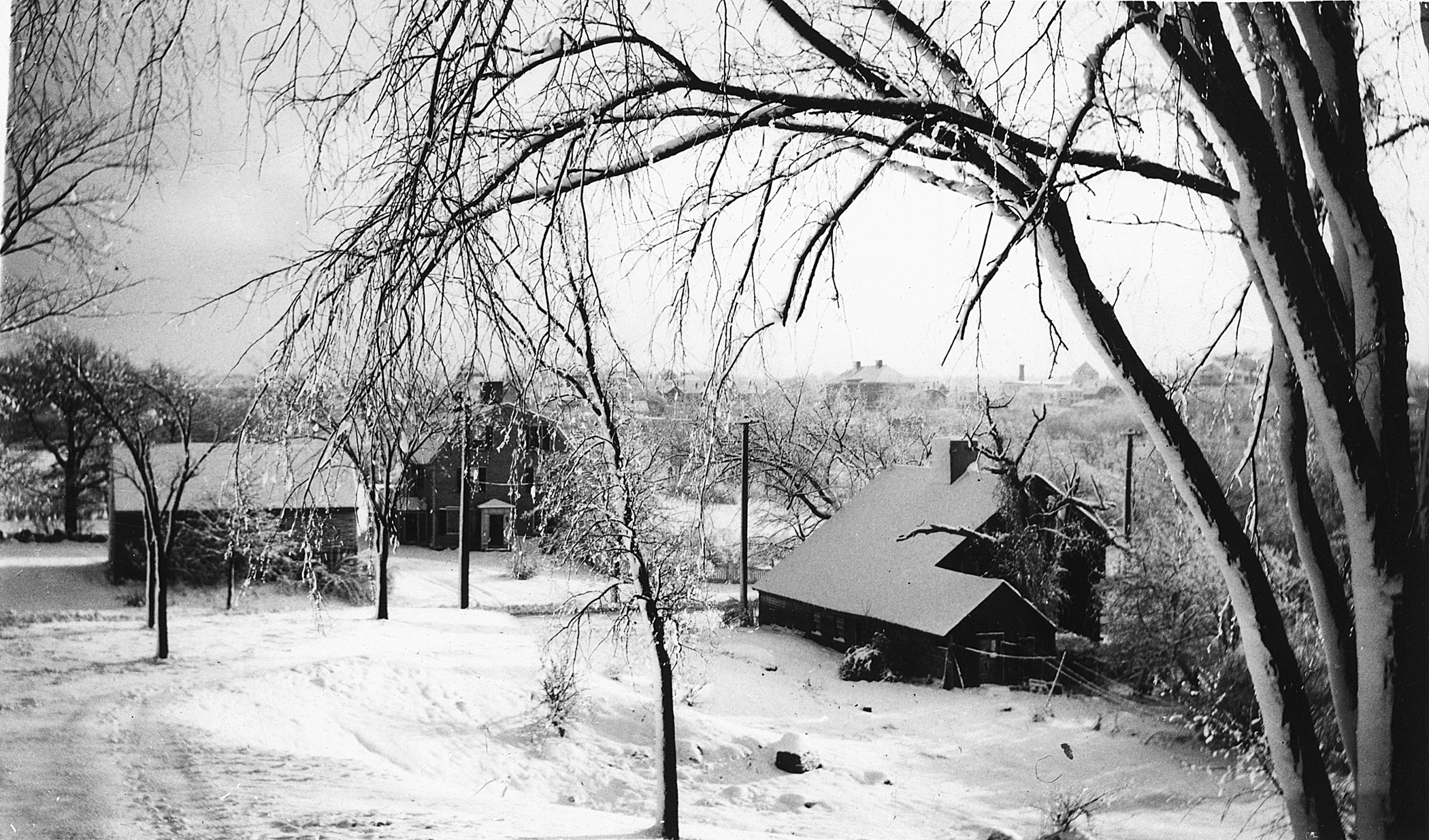
Back of White–Ellery House, winter c. 1900

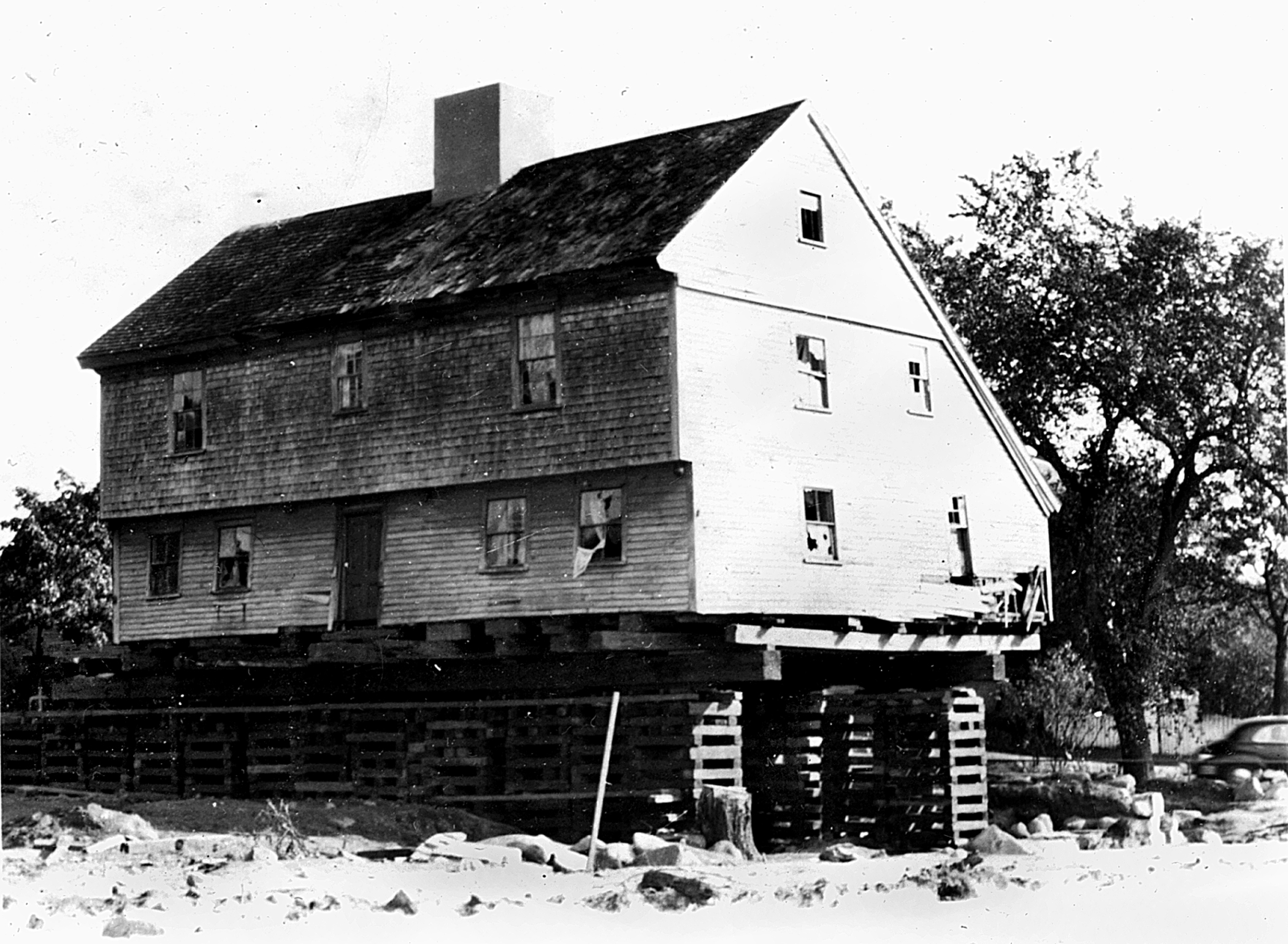
Being moved for Route 128, 1947

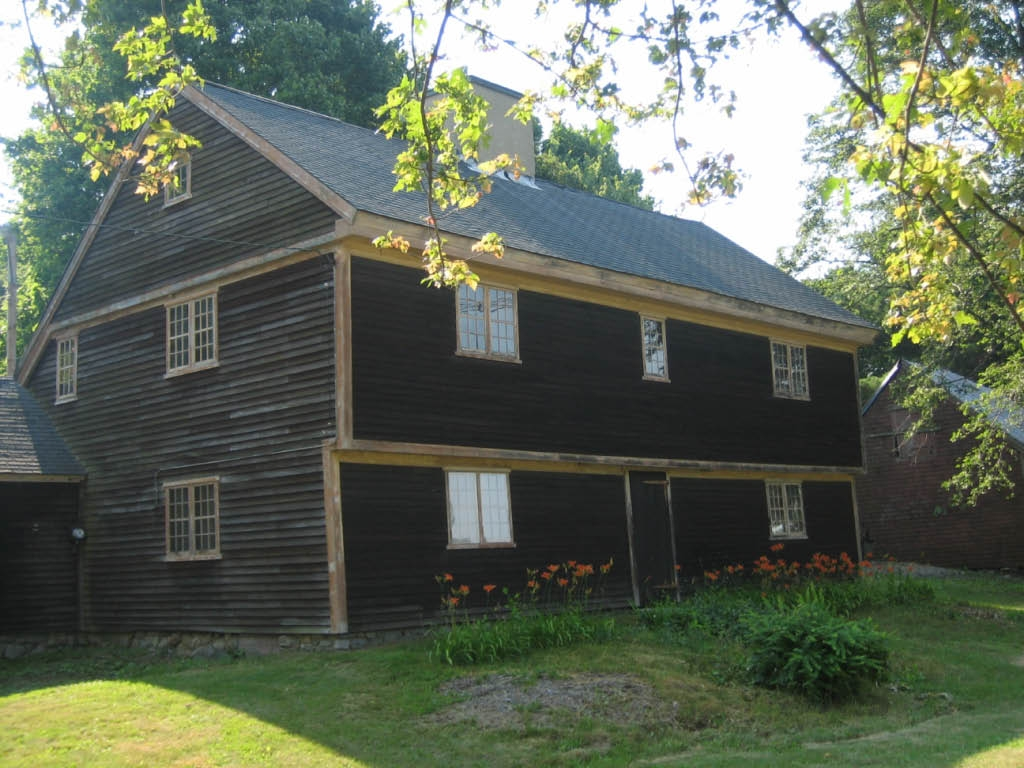
Pre-restoration work, 2007

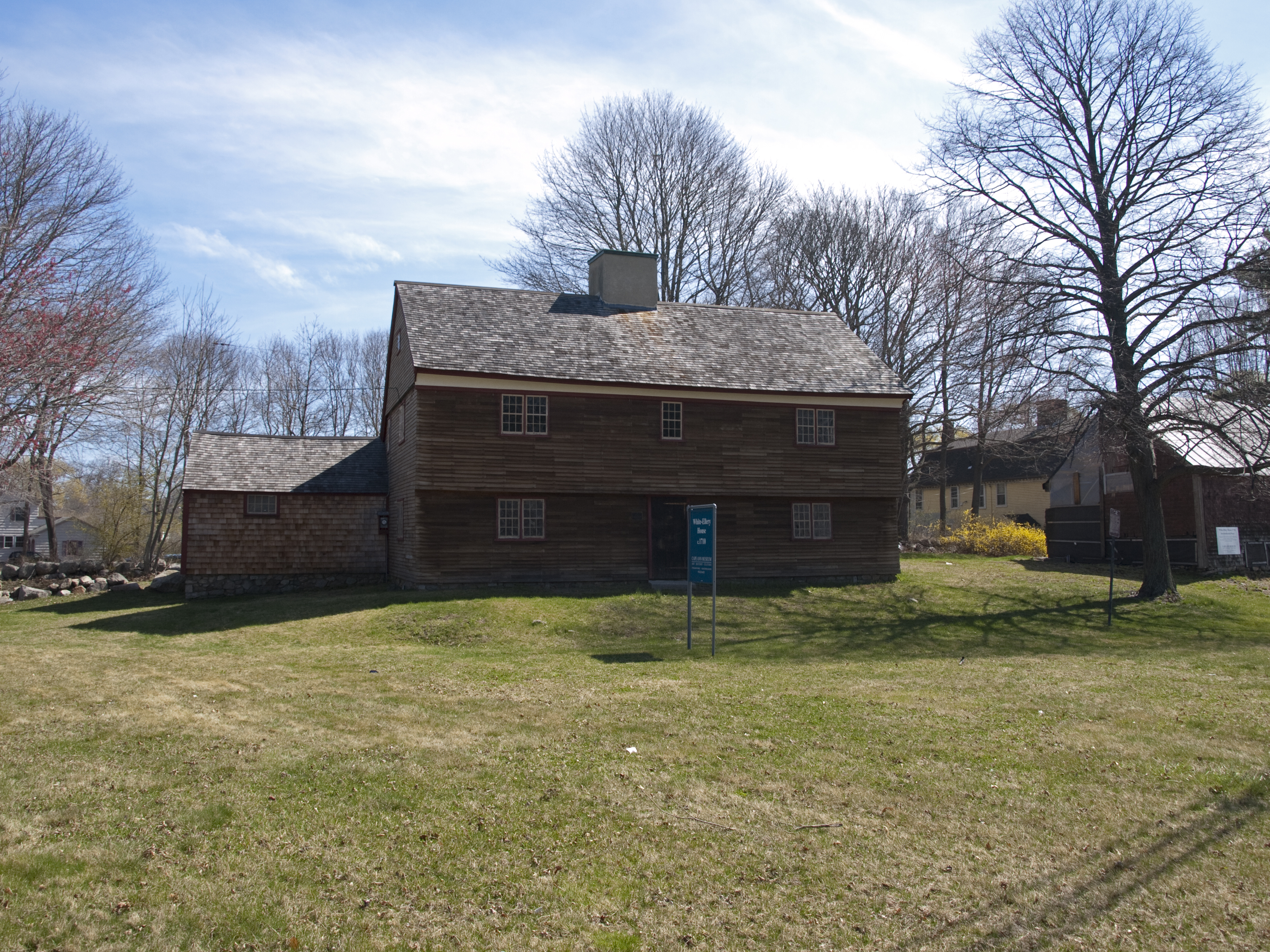
2012

== See also ==
- Whittemore House (Gloucester, Massachusetts), another First Period house
- National Register of Historic Places listings in Gloucester, Massachusetts
- National Register of Historic Places listings in Essex County, Massachusetts
