= Whitewash (1994 film) =

- Written by: Ntozake Shange
- Directed by: Michael Sporn
- Starring: Ruby Dee; Linda Lavin
- Music by: Caleb Sampson
- Country of origin: United States
- Original language: English

Production
- Producer: Michael Sporn
- Running time: 25 minutes
- Production companies: HBO; F-Stop Studio; Michael Sporn Animation

Original release
- Network: HBO
- Release: August 16, 1994

Whitewash is a 1994 television special and animated short film that was based on a true story. The program was produced and directed by Michael Sporn with a screenplay by Ntozake Shange. Ruby Dee and Linda Lavin provide voices for the animated characters.

== Plot ==
The family special, based on a true story, uses animation to tell the story of a little African-American girl's encounter with mindless racism. On their way home from school, Helene and her brother are attacked by a group of white thugs who beat him up and spray-paint her face white. Why would anyone do this? With her wise grandmother's help, Helene is able to get over her hurt.

== Cast ==
- Ruby Dee as Grandmother
- Serena Henry as Helene Angel
- Ndehru Roberts as Mauricio
- Linda Lavin as Ms. Steinberg
- Danielle Robinson as Naomi
- Randy Kaplan as Ronnie
- Matthew Jacobson as George
- Travis DeLingua as Tim
- Ashanti Williams as Rafael
- Winnie Zhang as Lorie
- Meredith Rosco as Mary
- Robert Felice as Jeff Ciolla
- Michael McGruther as Shades
- Tommy O'Connor as Ox
- Joel Briel as Police Inspector
- Sue Perrotto as Police Officer
- Jay Aubrey Jones, Ed Askinazi and Heidi Stallings as Reporters
