= Law of holes =

Adage

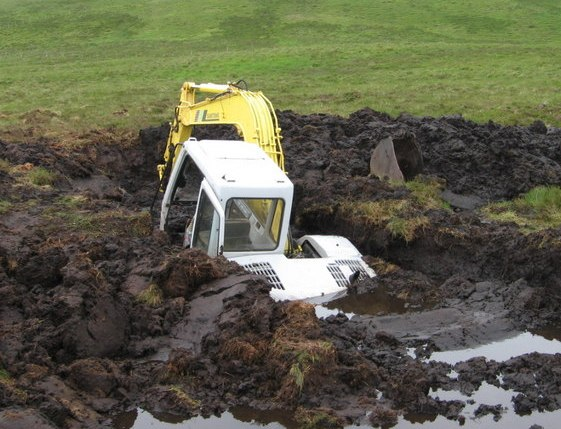
An excavator that is in a hole and has stopped digging.

The law of holes, or the first law of holes, is an adage that states: "If you find yourself in a hole, stop digging." It is used as a metaphor, warning that when in an untenable position, it is best to stop making the situation worse.

== Meaning ==
When it is said, "if you find yourself in a hole, stop digging", it is because digging a hole makes it deeper and therefore harder to get out of.

== Attribution ==
The adage has been attributed to a number of sources. It appeared in print on page six of The Washington Post dated 25 October 1911, in the form: "Nor would a wise man, seeing that he was in a hole, go to work and blindly dig it deeper..."

In 1983, Bill Brock was quoted "Let me tell you about the law of holes: If you find yourself in a hole, stop digging."

In the United Kingdom, it has been referred to as "Healey's first law of holes" after politician Denis Healey, who used the adage in the 1980s and later.

== See also ==
- Escalation of commitment – Human behavior pattern in which the participant takes on increasing risk
- Gresham's law – Monetary principle
- List of proverbial phrases
- Mike Mulligan and His Steam Shovel – 1939 children's book by Virginia Lee Burton
- Pyrrhic victory – Victory at a cost tantamount to defeat
- Sunk cost fallacy – Unrecoverable cost that has been incurred
