= Mike Mulligan and His Steam Shovel =

1939 children's book by Virginia Lee Burton

- First edition
- Author: Virginia Lee Burton
- Language: English
- Publisher: Houghton Mifflin Company
- Publication date: 1939
- Pages: 48
- ISBN: 0395169615 1967 edition
- OCLC: 170273
- LC Class: PZ7.B954 Mi

Mike Mulligan and His Steam Shovel is a children's book by Virginia Lee Burton. First published in 1939, it features Mike Mulligan and his steam shovel Mary Anne. It is considered a classic favorite of children's literature: based on a 2007 online poll, the National Education Association listed the book as one of its "Teachers' Top 100 Books for Children."

An animated short film of the same name, directed by Michael Sporn and narrated by stand-up comedian Robert Klein, was adapted from the book and first aired by HBO in 1990; it has been regularly shown as an "HBO Storybook Musical" and has been released on DVD.

== Plot ==
After many years working together, Mike Mulligan and his classic steam-powered motor shovel Mary Anne face competition from the modern gasoline, electric, and diesel-powered shovels. Searching for work, they find a small town about to build a new town hall. Mike offers that if he and Mary Anne can't do the job of digging the cellar in a single day, the town won't have to pay them. The town's selectmen – who believe the work would take a hundred men a week – hire Mike and Mary Anne, expecting to get their new cellar at no cost. Privately, even Mike has some doubts.

At sunup the next day Mike and Mary Anne begin work. They are successfully able to complete the cellar, but Mike realizes that he neglected to build a ramp to get Mary Anne out. A child suggests that she be converted into a boiler for the new building's heating system, and that Mike become its janitor. Mike and Mary Anne settle contentedly into their new jobs.

== Background ==
According to a 2006 article in The Boston Globe, the author set the book in West Newbury, Massachusetts after she attended a town meeting in 1938 and sketched the town hall and townspeople. She was inspired to convert the steam shovel to a furnace by the son of friends, as they all discussed the book over dinner:

At dinner on Chestnut Hill that evening, the author told the Albertsons and Berkenbushes about her dilemma. She had written Mike and Mary Anne into a literal corner – they were stuck in the hole they dug for the Town Hall basement. Dick, then about 12 years old, suggested the steam shovel could become the building's heating source. It was a simple notion, he said. "My father had a garage in town that had a steam heating system, so I was familiar with it."

== Cultural references ==
- The book was occasionally read by host Captain Kangaroo (Bob Keeshan) on his children's television show of the same name.
- In Ramona the Pest by Beverly Cleary, the title character starts kindergarten with an inexperienced teacher, Miss Binney, who reads Mike Mulligan and His Steam Shovel to the class.
- In The Dark Tower III: The Waste Lands by Stephen King, Jake notes that the art style in the book Charlie the Choo-Choo is similar to that of Mike Mulligan and His Steam Shovel.

== Adaptation ==
In 1990, HBO first aired an animated short film adapted from Mike Mulligan and His Steam Shovel, directed by Michael Sporn, adapted and narrated by stand-up comedian Robert Klein, and produced by Michael Sporn Animation and Italtoons Corporation. As of 2012, this short film is regularly shown as an "HBO Storybook Musical". It was released in 1992 on VHS by Golden Book Video (a partner company of Golden Books). The video was also released on DVD by Scholastic Books under an HBO license, along with 27 other films adapted from classic children's books.

In 2006, Weston Woods Studios adapted the book to an animated film narrated by David De Vries and directed by Leigh Corra.

== See also ==
- Law of holes
