= Cape Ann Museum =

Coordinates: 42°36′54.1074″N 70°39′43.2318″W

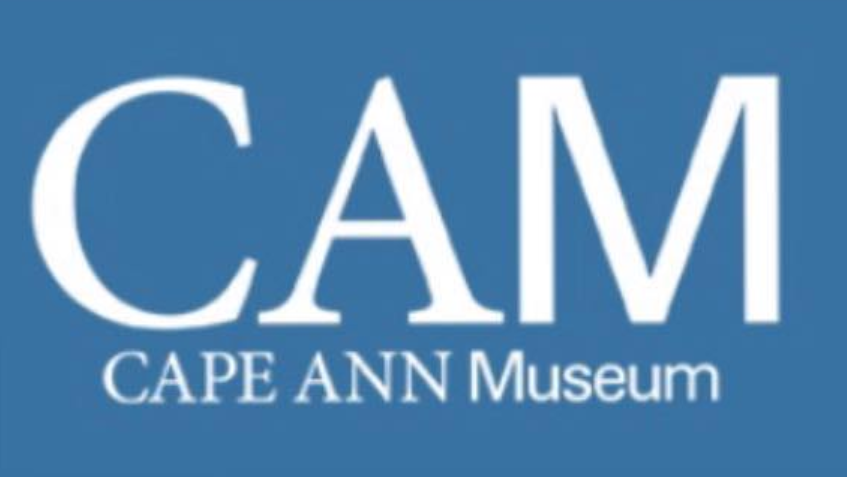

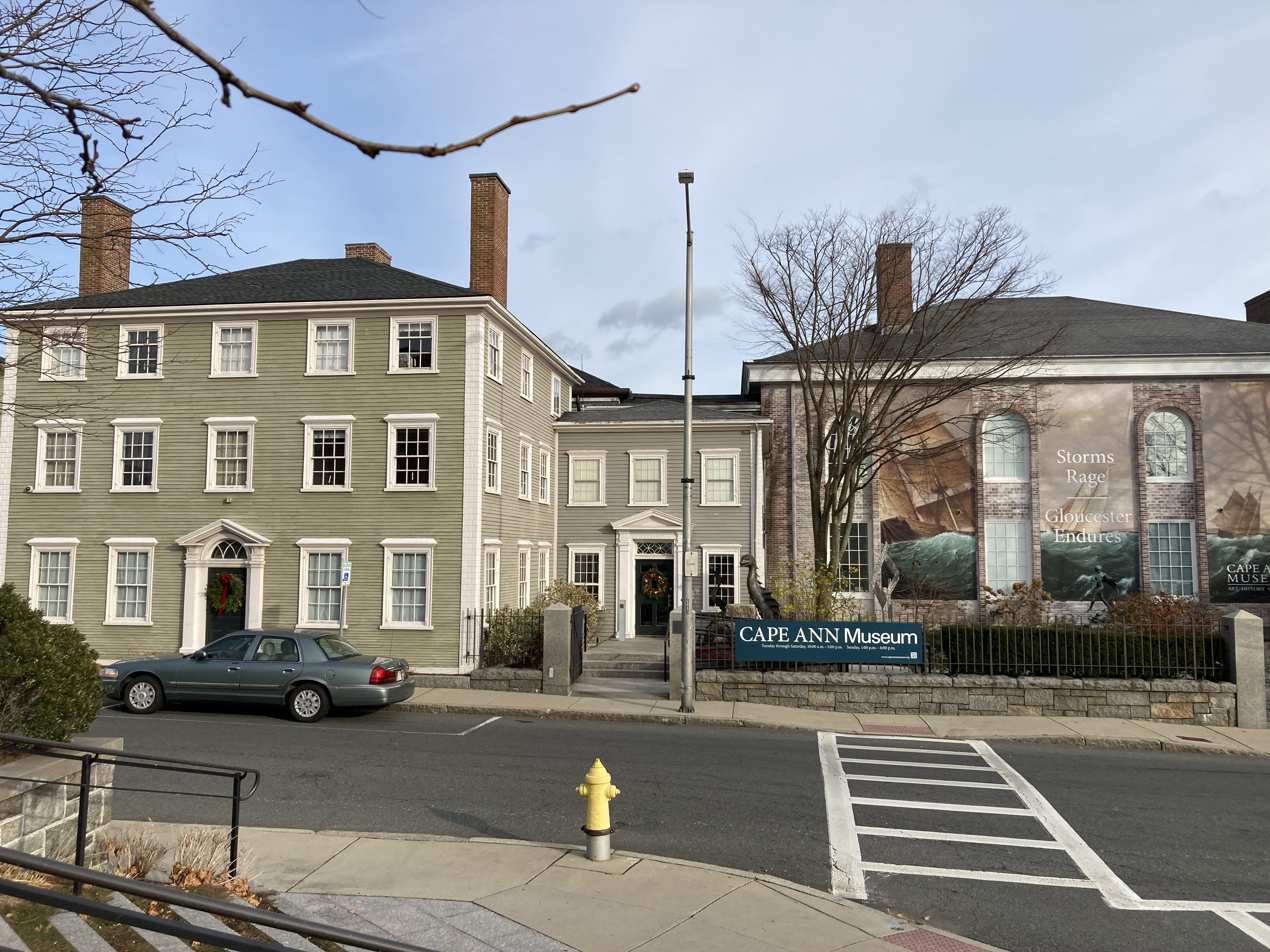
- Cape Ann Museum; Captain Elias Davis House (left); 1936 addition (center); 1968 addition (right)
- Interactive fullscreen map
- Established: 1875
- Location: 27 Pleasant Street; Gloucester, Massachusetts
- Type: Local museum
- Director: Oliver Barker
- Public transit access: Newburyport/Rockport Line Gloucester Station; CATA Post Office – City Hall, Main St & Pleasant St
- Website: www.capeannmuseum.org

Cape Ann Museum is an art and historical museum located in Gloucester, Massachusetts. Its collection and programming focuses on the artists and art colonies of Cape Ann, including the Rocky Neck Art Colony and the Folly Cove Designers. The museum's collection also features objects from Gloucester's fishing and maritime history, and granite quarrying history.

== History ==
The Cape Ann Museum was founded in 1875 as the Cape Ann Scientific and Literary Association. Dr. Herman E. Davidson was the association's first president, a position he held until 1878 when he left Gloucester. In 1923, the association moved to its current location in the Captain Elias Davis House at 27 Pleasant Street. During this period, the association acquired the collection of the Gloucester Historical Society, becoming the Cape Ann Scientific, Literary, and Historical Society, which it later shortened to the Cape Ann Historical Association. At this time, it expanded its collection of American fine and decorative arts, maritime and fishing objects, and other historical collections relating to the culture, life, and industries of Cape Ann. In 1937, Alfred Mansfield Brooks became curator and president of the Cape Ann Historical Association. During his thirty-year tenure, he compiled the largest collection of Fitz Henry Lane paintings and printed matter in the United States. In 2007 the Board voted to change the name of the Cape Ann Historical Association to the Cape Ann Museum to reflect its current collecting and programming mission.

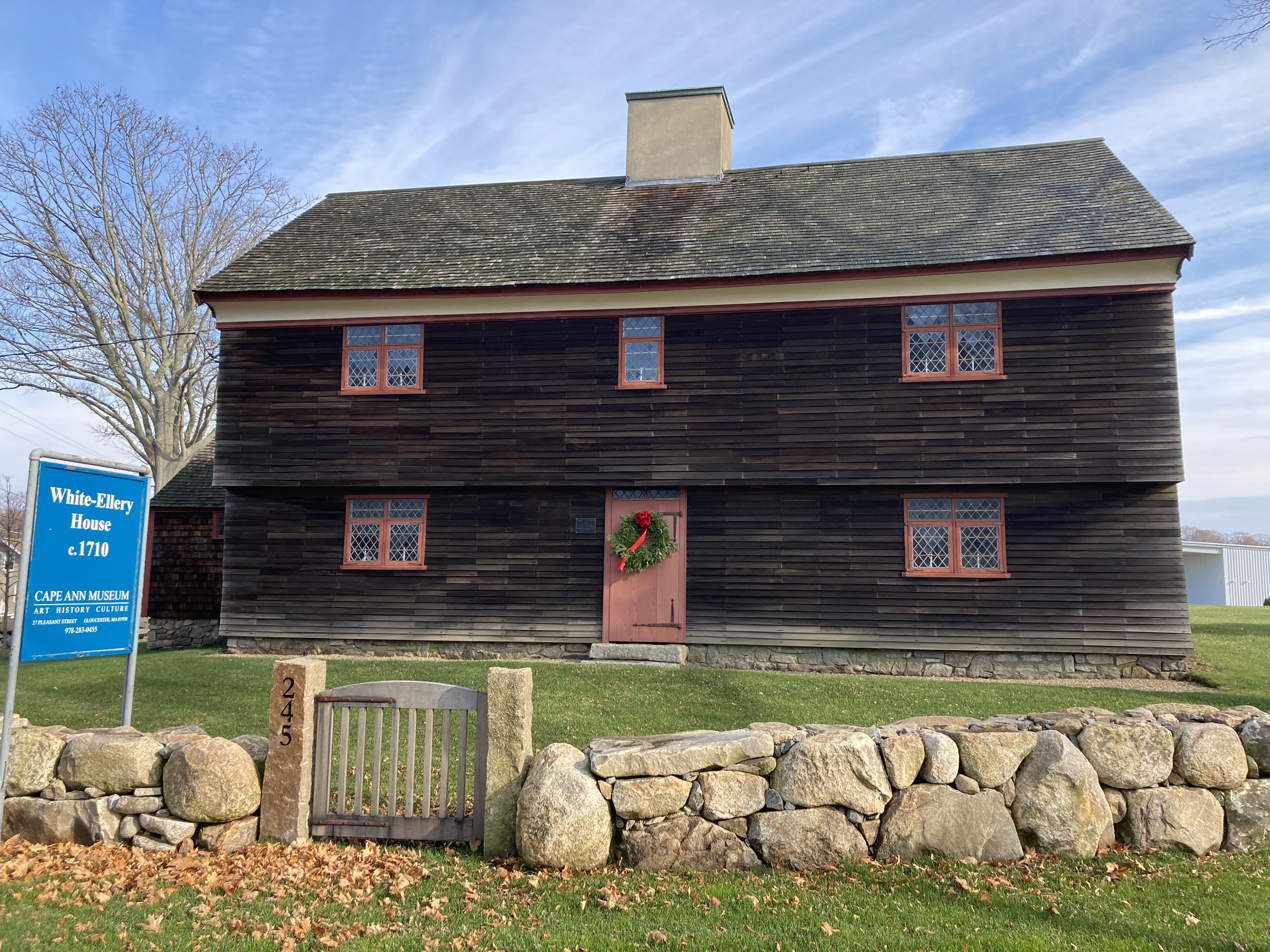
Historic White Ellery House (1710) at the Cape Ann Museum Green.

=== Captain Elias Davis House ===
The Captain Elias Davis House, built in 1804 by a successful sea captain, contains much of the museum's furniture and decorative arts collection. Many of the objects in the house belonged to Elias Davis and his descendants. The house is adjacent to the main museum galleries and 6 of the 12 rooms are open to the public.

== Museum expansion ==
In order to accommodate its growing collections, the Cape Ann Museum expanded or renovated its gallery and programming space five times between 1936 and 2014.

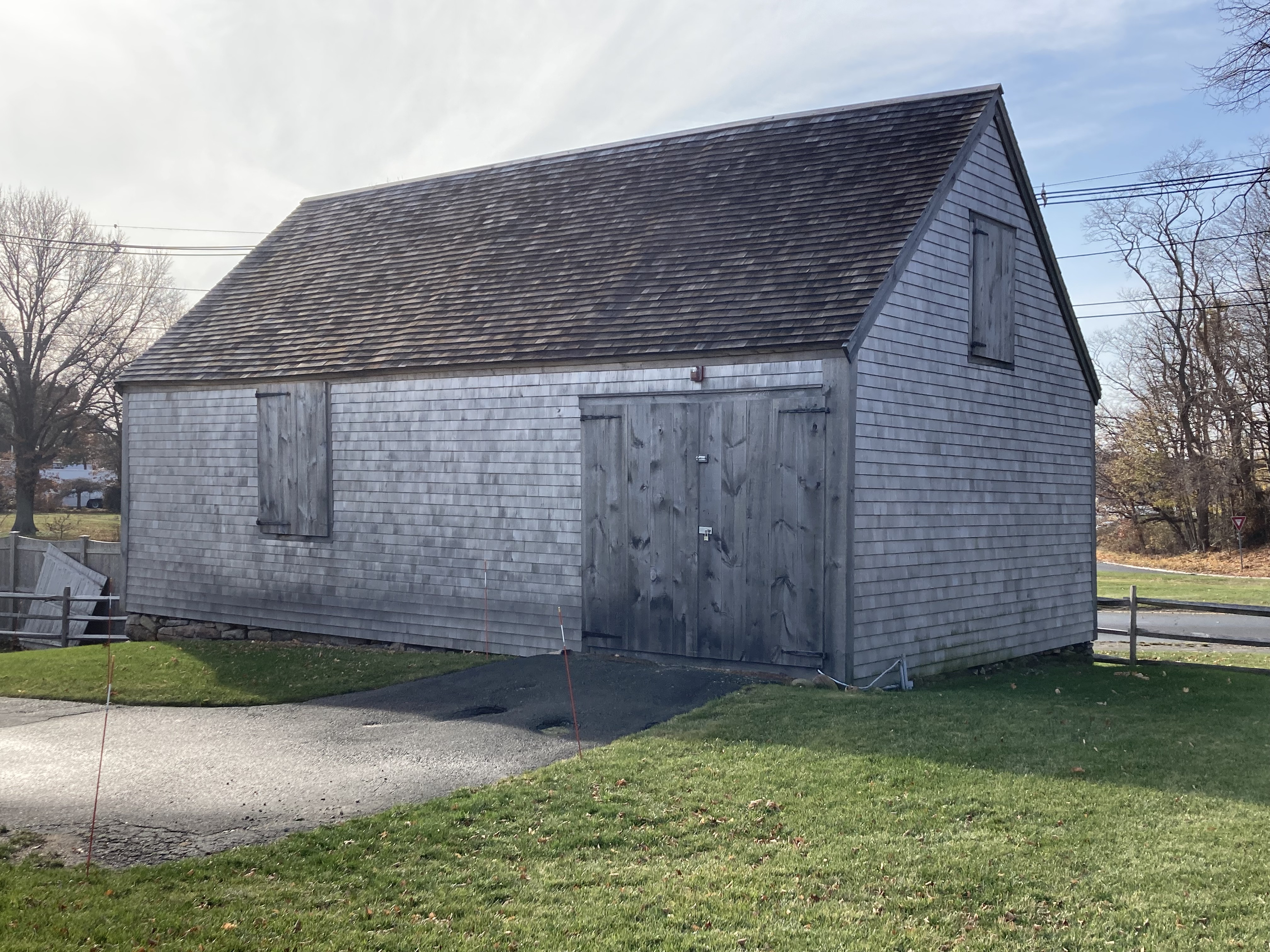
Historic Barn (c. 1740) at the Cape Ann Museum Green.

- 1936: the Cape Ann Historical Association added a two-story addition behind the Elias Davis House on Federal Street. This addition contains additional exhibition space and a ground floor auditorium. The addition was conceived as a separate building, but was connected to the Davis House shortly after it was built. A new entrance was also built adjacent to the Davis House. The construction was funded by the Catalina Davis Fund. Catalina Davis also donated most of the family heirlooms now on display in the Captain Elias Davis House and bequeathed an endowment to help fund the museum in perpetuity.
- 1968: after the association purchased the lot next to the Davis house in 1965, it built a four-story structure that contains gallery space and storage. The first floor gallery space is currently dedicated to the artworks of Fitz Henry Lane.
- 1989–1993: the association purchased the former New England Telephone building on Elm street in 1989. During the next four years, the museum buildings underwent major renovations, including expanding exhibition spaces, creating a new education room, developing office space, adding an elevator, building a third story link between the structures, and expanding the Library and Archives.
- 2002–2014: in a little over a decade, the museum renovated galleries (2002), added an outdoor sculpture court (2006), created a landscaped park and sculpture garden across Pleasant Street facing the museum entrance (2011), created a new central gallery (2013–2014), and created a gallery to house the Thacher Island Lighthouse's first-order Fresnel Lens.

== Cape Ann Museum Green ==
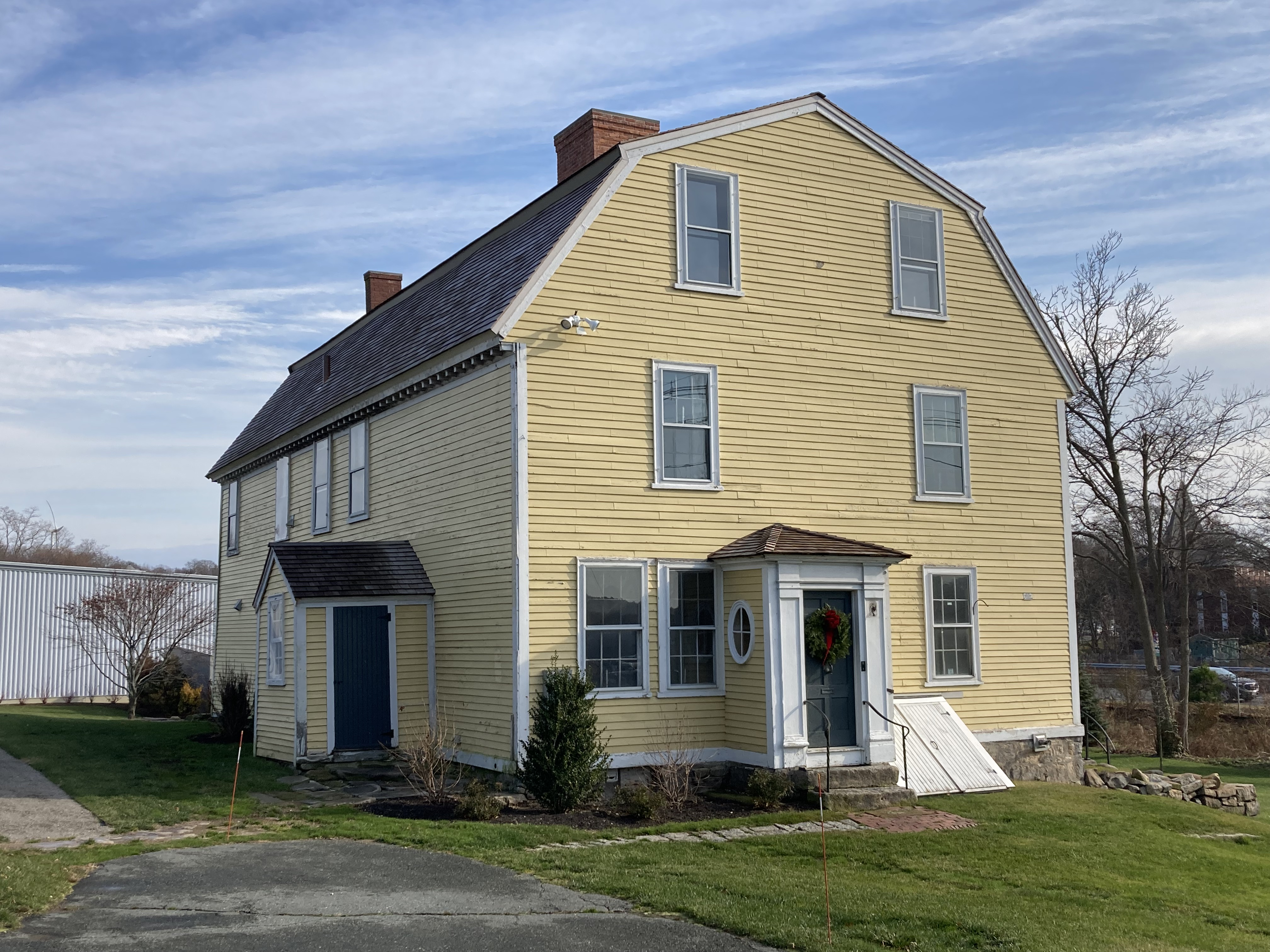
Historic Babson-Alling House (c. 1740) at the Cape Ann Museum Green.

On September 17, 2020, the Cape Ann Museum opened its new campus, the Cape Ann Museum Green, located off of Grant Circle and Route 128, Gloucester, MA. This four acre green space is home to the museum's three historic structures, the White-Ellery House (1710), a barn (c. 1740), and the Babson-Alling House (c. 1740). It is also home to the Janet and William Ellery James Center, a 12,000 square foot building that houses the museum's object and archival collections. Designed by the Boston-based firm, designLAB, part of the building includes 2,000 square feet of exhibition and programming space.

== Collection ==
The highlights include:

- The largest collection of Fitz Henry Lane maritime and landscape paintings
- A scale model of Gloucester port in the 19th century
- The Cape Ann dory used by Alfred Johnson to cross the Atlantic Ocean in 1876
- The original Thacher Island Fresnel lens
- Sample books, display hangings and other artifacts by the Folly Cove Designers
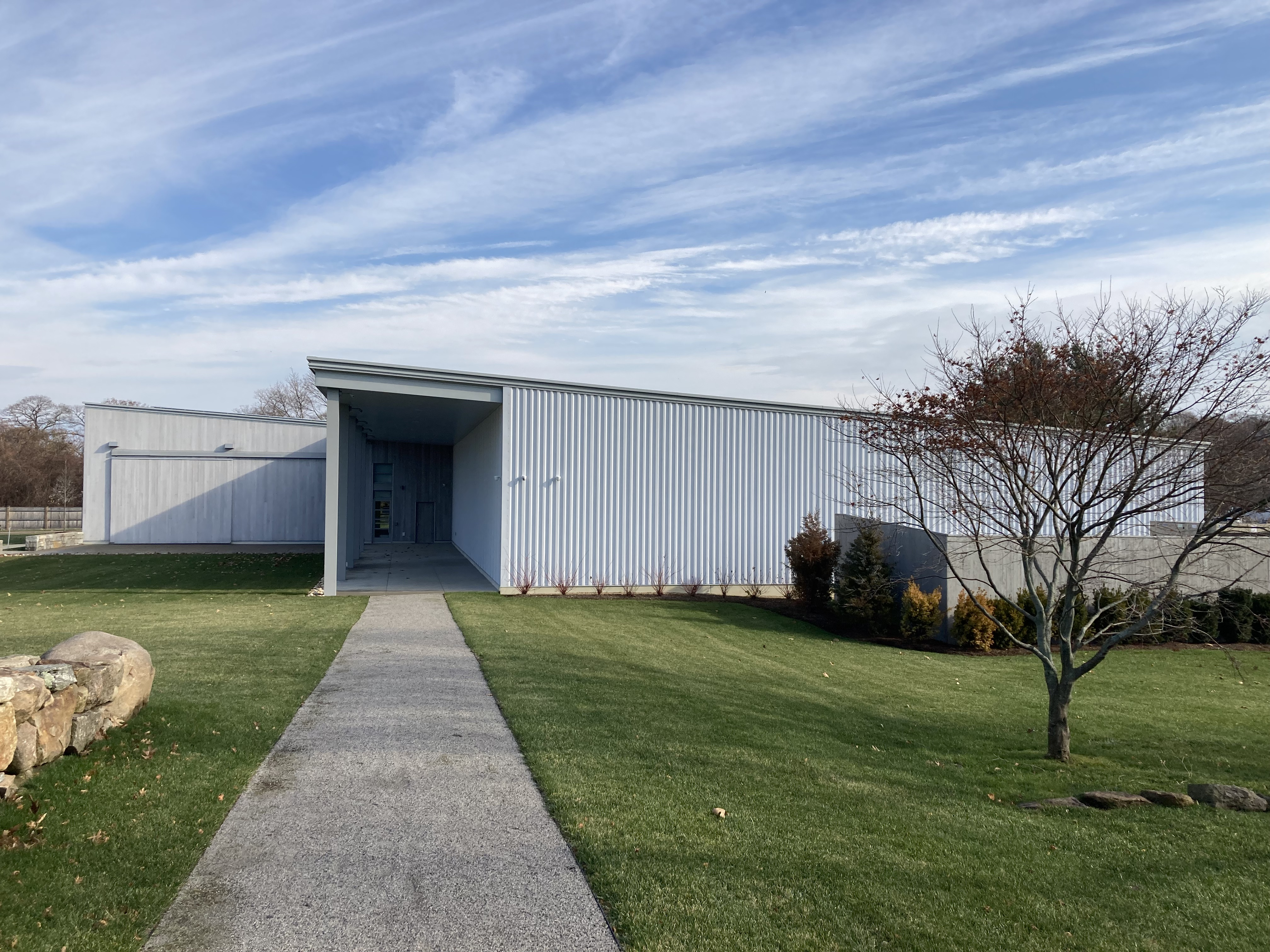
- Collections and flexible exhibition and programming space at the Cape Ann Museum Green. Designed by designLAB, Boston, 2020.
  Works by Gilbert Stuart, Winslow Homer, Cecilia Beaux, Frank Duveneck, John Sloan, Milton Avery, and Stuart Davis.

== See also ==
- List of maritime museums in the United States
