= List of forts in the United States =

This is a list of historical forts in the United States. World War II military reservations containing 8-inch and larger gun batteries are also included.

== Alabama ==
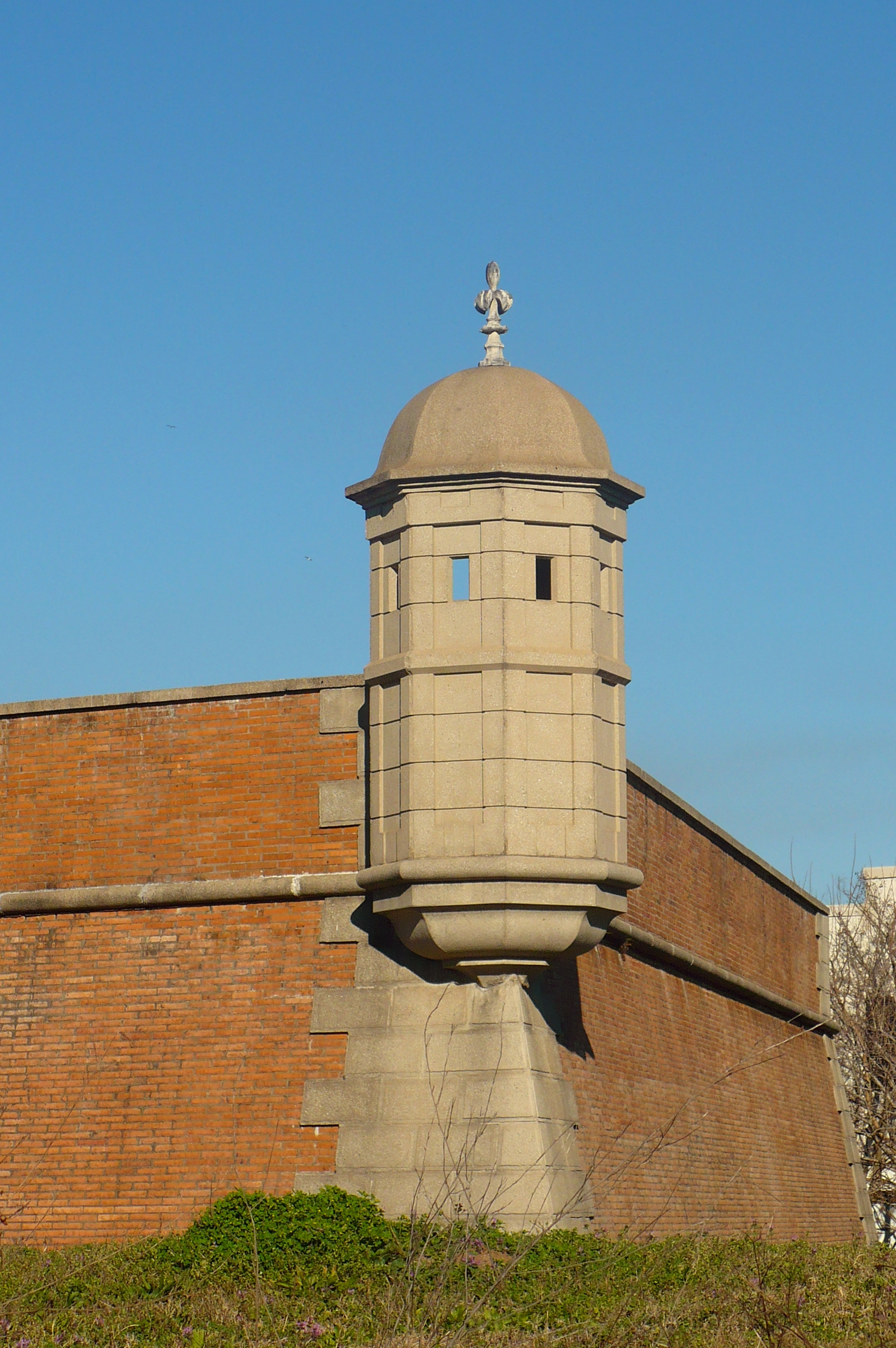
Fort Condé

- Fort Armstrong
- Fort Bibb
- Fort Bowyer
- Fort Carney
- Fort Claiborne
- Fort Condé, open to the public
- Fort Crawford
- Fort Dale
- Fort Decatur
- Fort Easley
- Fort Gaines
- Fort Glass
- Fort Hampton
- Fort Harker
- Fort Hull
- Fort Jackson, open to the public
- Fort Landrum
- Fort Leslie
- Fort Likens
- Fort Madison
- Fort McClellan
- Fort Montgomery
- Fort Morgan, open to the public
- Fort Novosel, closed to the public
- Fort Sinquefield
- Fort Stoddert
- Fort Strother
- Fort Tombecbe, open to the public
- Fort Toulouse, open to the public
- Fort Williams, destroyed by erosion

== Alaska ==
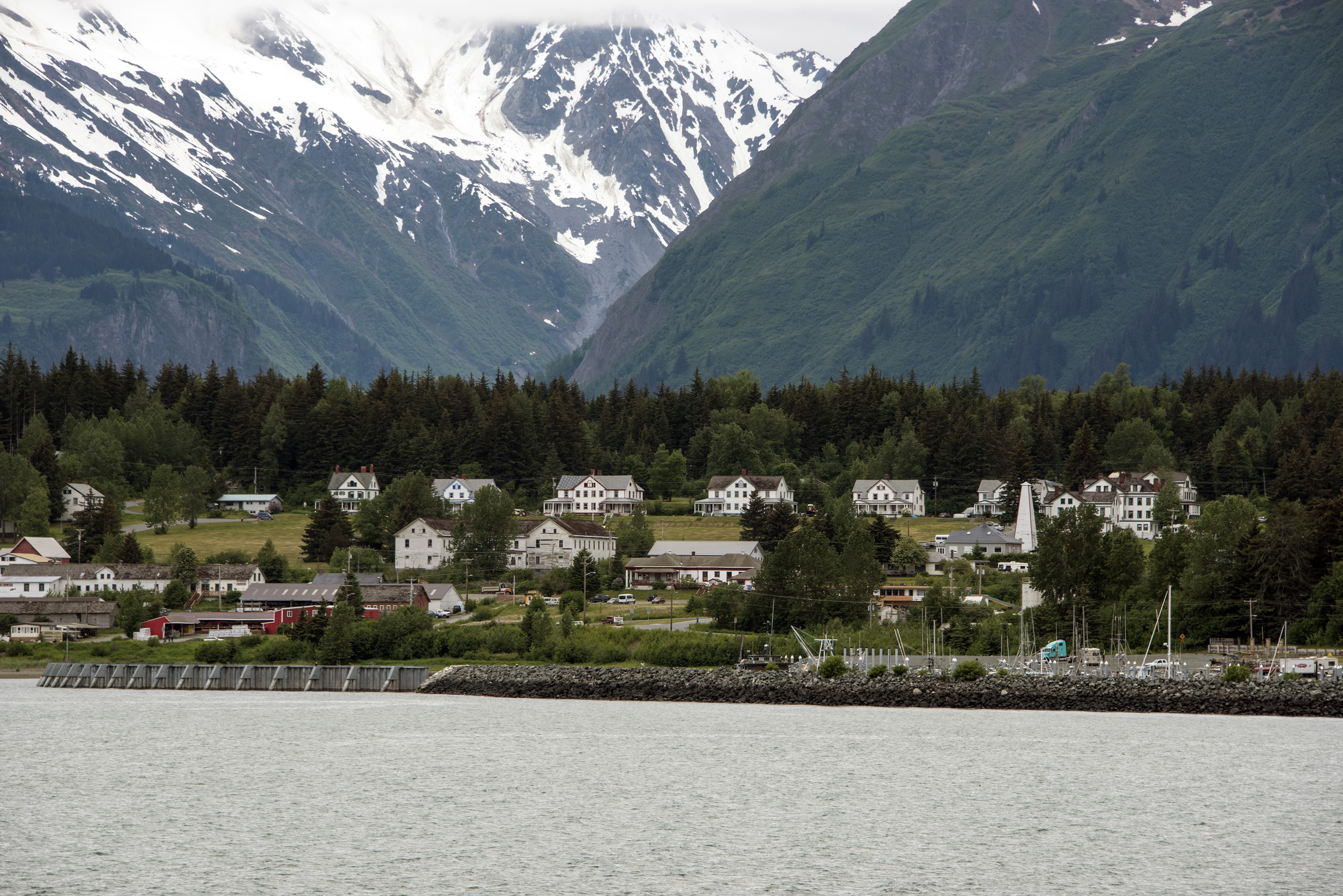
Fort William H. Seward

- Fort Abercrombie, open to the public
- Fort Brumback
- Fort Learnard
- Fort Davis
- Fort Greely, closed to the public
- Fort Egbert
- Fort Gibbon
- Fort Learnard
- Fort McGilvray
- Fort Mears
- Fort Randall, closed to the public
- Fort Raymond
- Fort Richardson, closed to the public
- Fort Rousseau
- Fort Schwatka
- Fort William H. Seward
- Fort St. Michael
- Fort St. Nicholas
- Fort Tongass
- Fort Wainwright, closed to the public

== Arizona ==
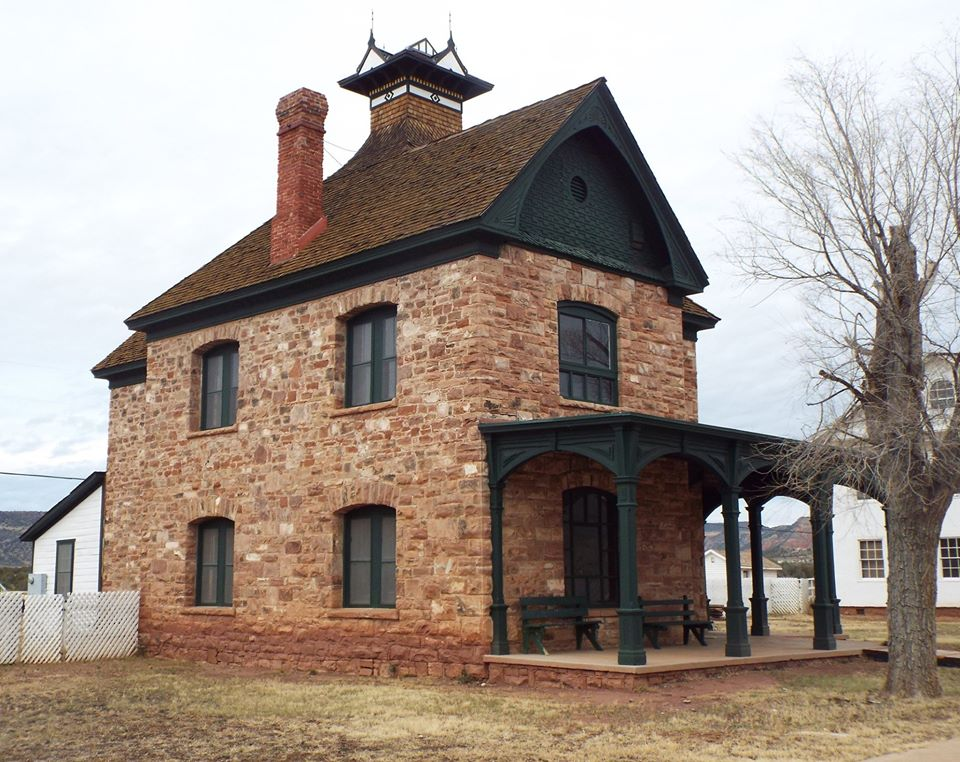
Fort Apache

- Fort Apache, open to the public
- Fort Bowie, open to the public
- Fort Buchanan
- Fort Crittenden
- Fort Defiance
- Fort Grant, closed to the public
- Fort Huachuca, closed to the public
- Fort Lowell, open to the public
- Fort Mojave
- Fort Tyson
- Fort Verde, open to the public
- Fort Whipple, open to the public

== Arkansas ==
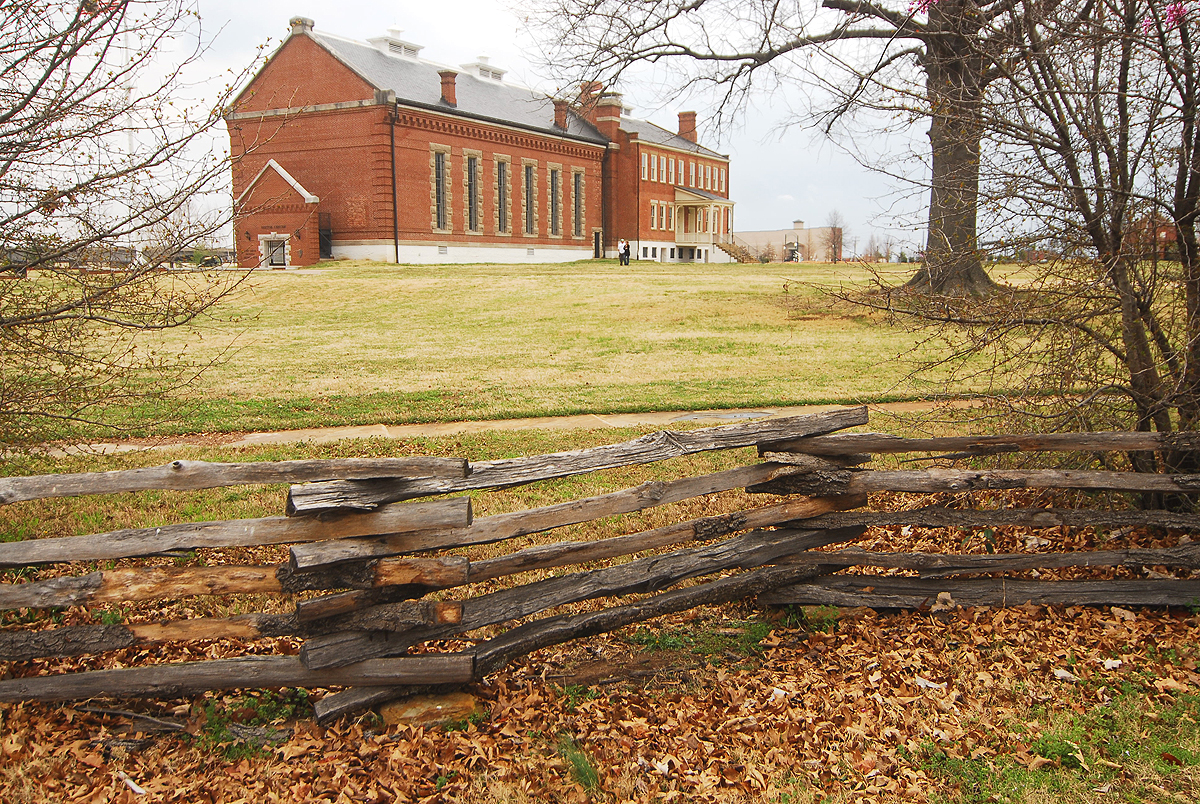
Fort Smith

- Fort Carlos III, destroyed by erosion
- Fort Chaffee, closed to the public
- Fort Curtis, open to the public
- Fort Logan H. Roots, open to the public
- Fort Lookout, open to the public
- Fort Smith, open to the public

== Connecticut ==
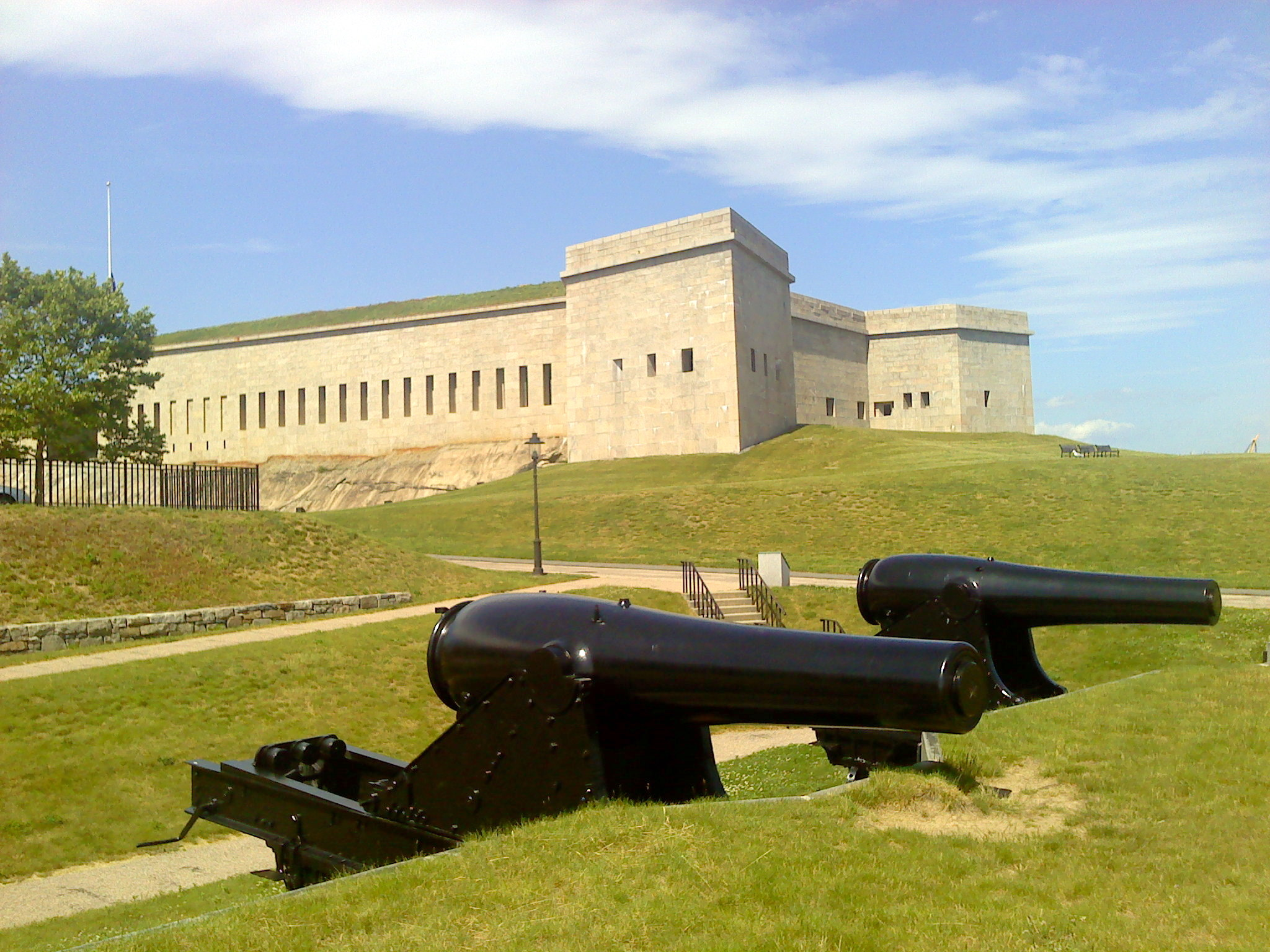
Fort Trumbull

- Fort Griswold, open to the public
- Fort Nathan Hale, open to the public
- Fort Trumbull, open to the public
- Fort Stamford, open to the public

== Delaware ==
Fort Delaware

- Fort Casimir, destroyed
- Fort Christina, open to the public
- Fort Delaware, open to the public
- Fort du Pont, open to the public
- Fort Miles, open to the public
- Fort Saulsbury, closed to the public

== Georgia ==
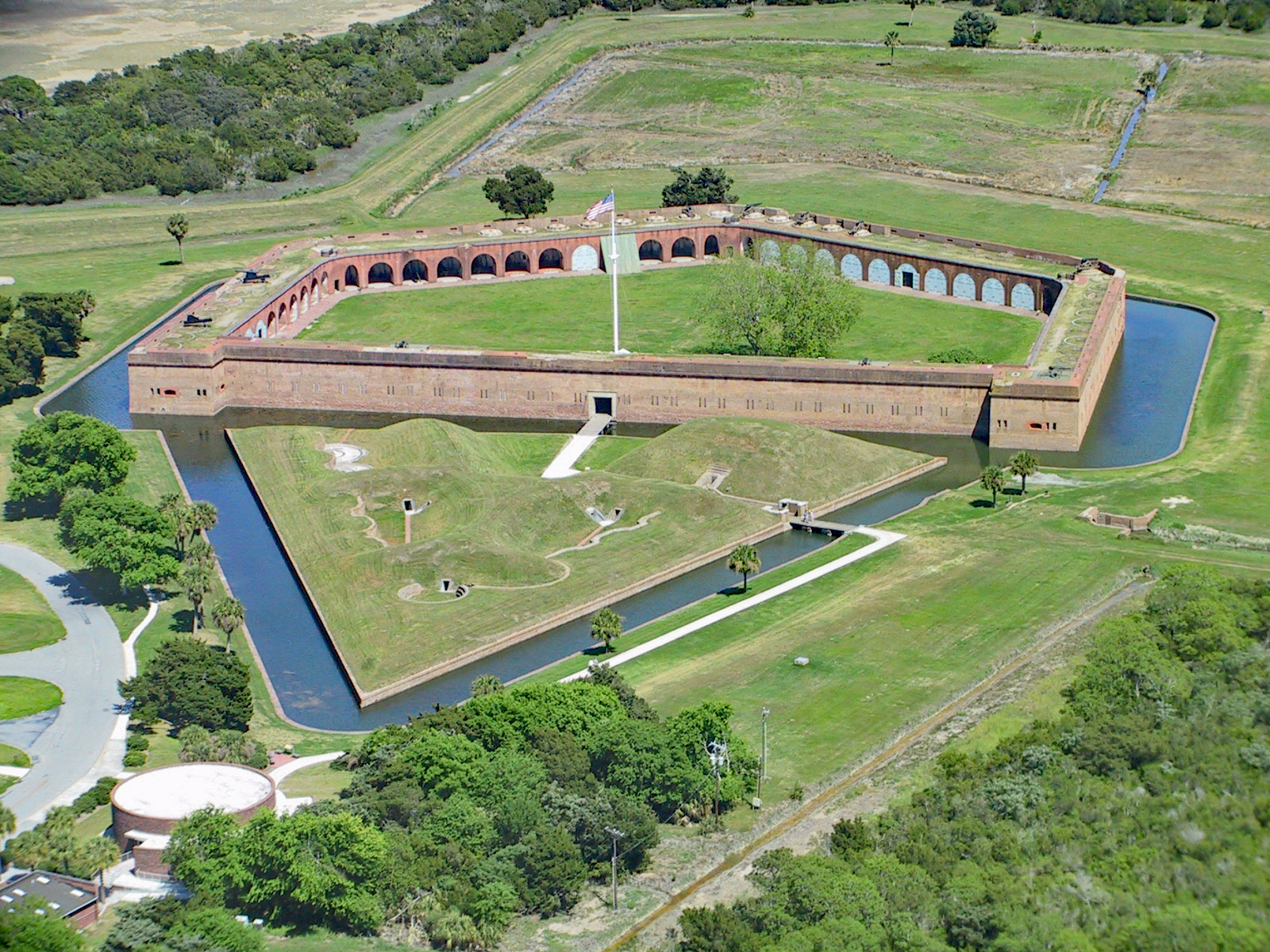
Fort Pulaski

- Fort Gordon, closed to the public
- Fort Frederica, open to the public
- Fort Gillem
- Fort Hawkins, open to the public
- Fort James Jackson, open to the public
- Fort King George, open to the public
- Fort McAllister, open to the public
- Fort McPherson
- Fort Benning, closed to the public
- Fort Pulaski, open to the public
- Fort Scott
- Fort Stewart, closed to the public

== Hawaii ==
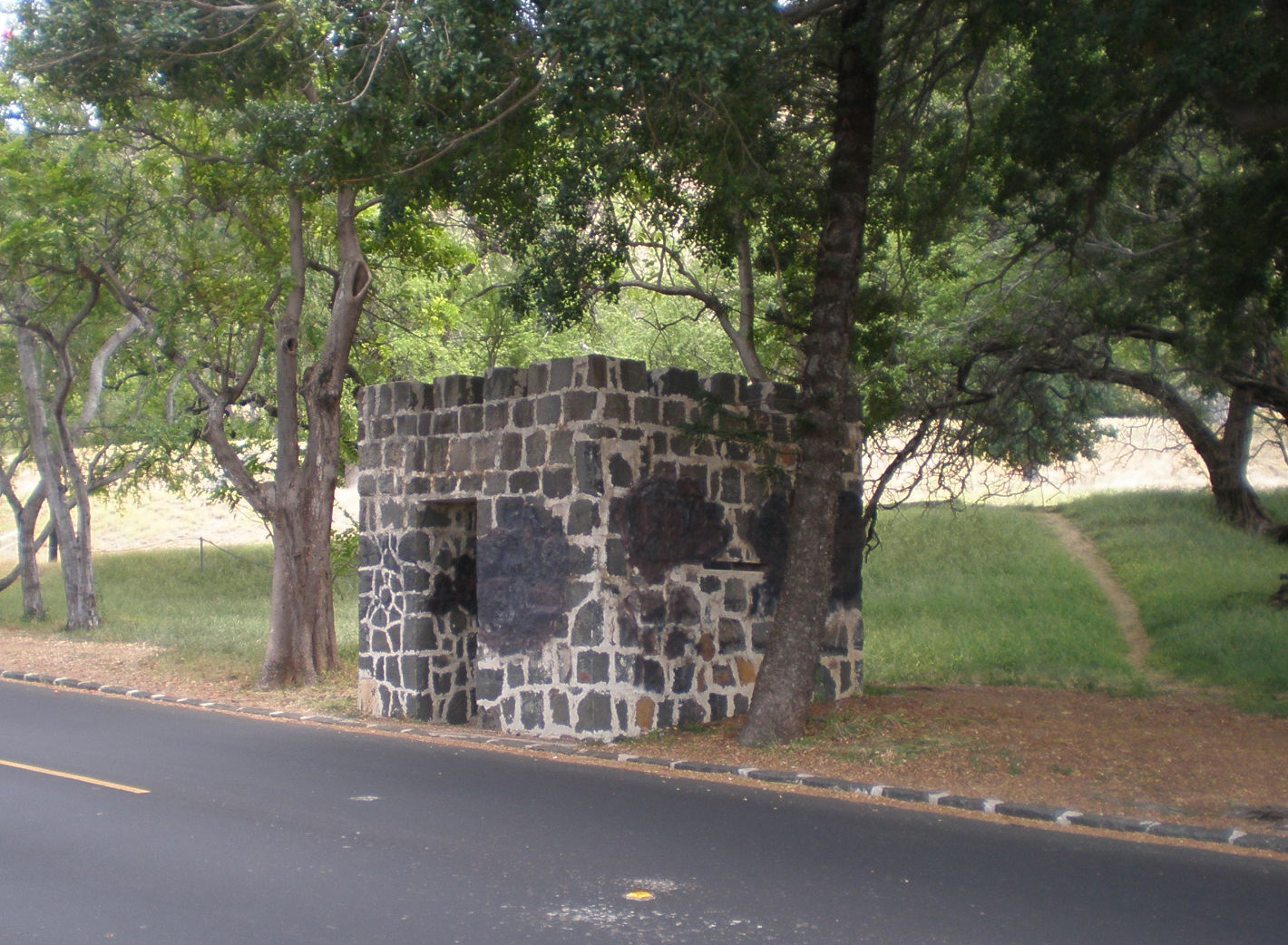
Fort Ruger

- Fort Armstrong
- Fort DeRussy, closed to the public
- Fort Hase, closed to the public
- Fort Kamehameha
- Fort Elizabeth, open to the public
- Fort Ruger, open to the public
- Schofield Barracks, closed to the public
- Fort Shafter, closed to the public

== Idaho ==
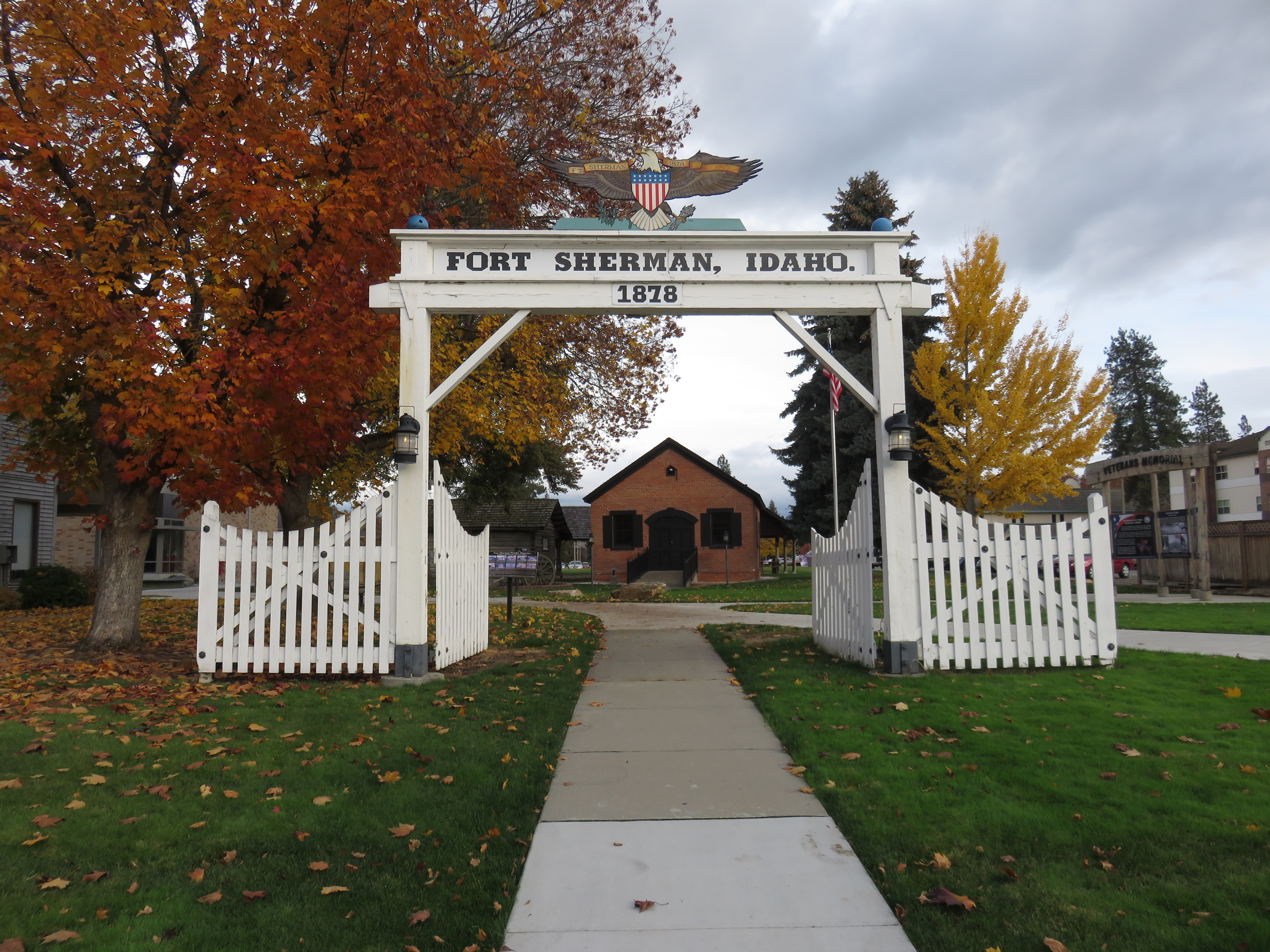
Fort Sherman

- Fort Boise
- Camp Connor
- Fort Hall, open to the public
- Fort Lapwai, open to the public
- Fort Sherman, open to the public

== Illinois ==
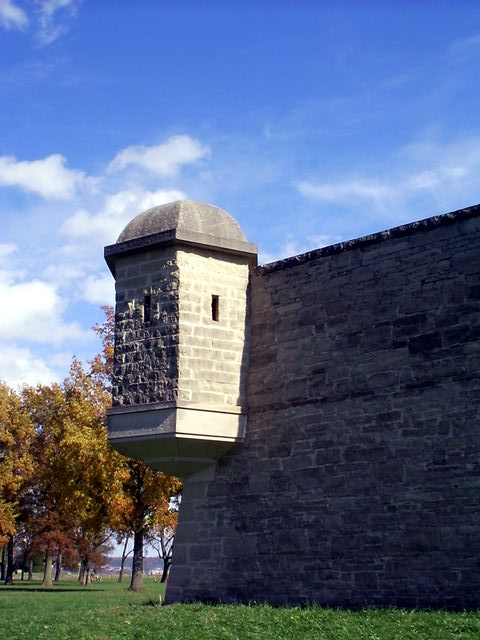
Fort de Chartres

- Fort Armstrong
- Fort de Chartres
- Fort Dearborn
- Fort Johnson
- Fort Kaskaskia
- Fort Massac
- Fort Sheridan

== Indiana ==
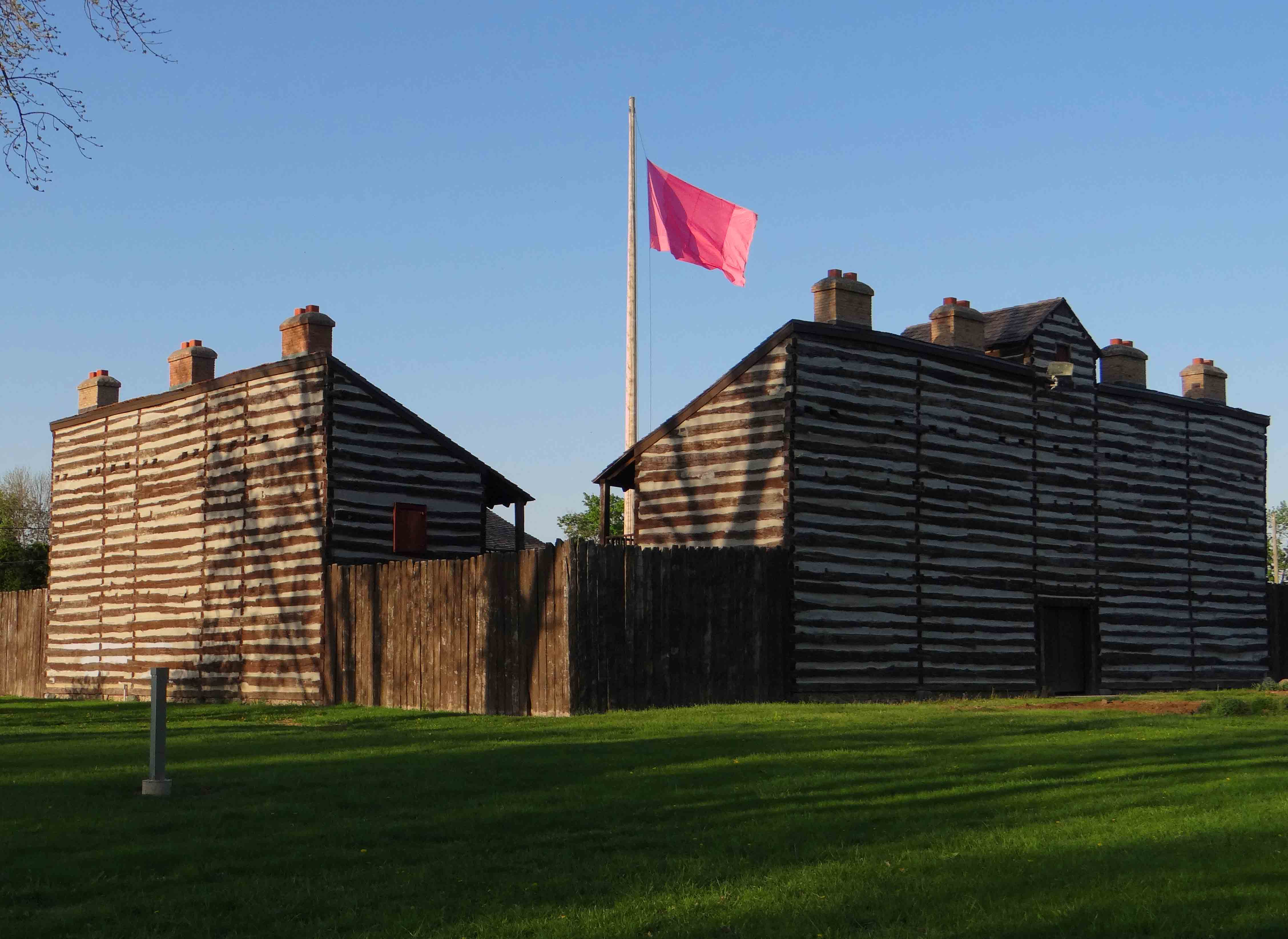
Fort Wayne

- Fort Benjamin Harrison, open to the public
- Fort Patrick Henry, abandoned
- Fort Knox, abandoned
- Fort Wayne, open to the public
- Fort Ouiatenon, destroyed during the Northwest Indian War
- Fort Vallonia, open to the public

== Iowa ==
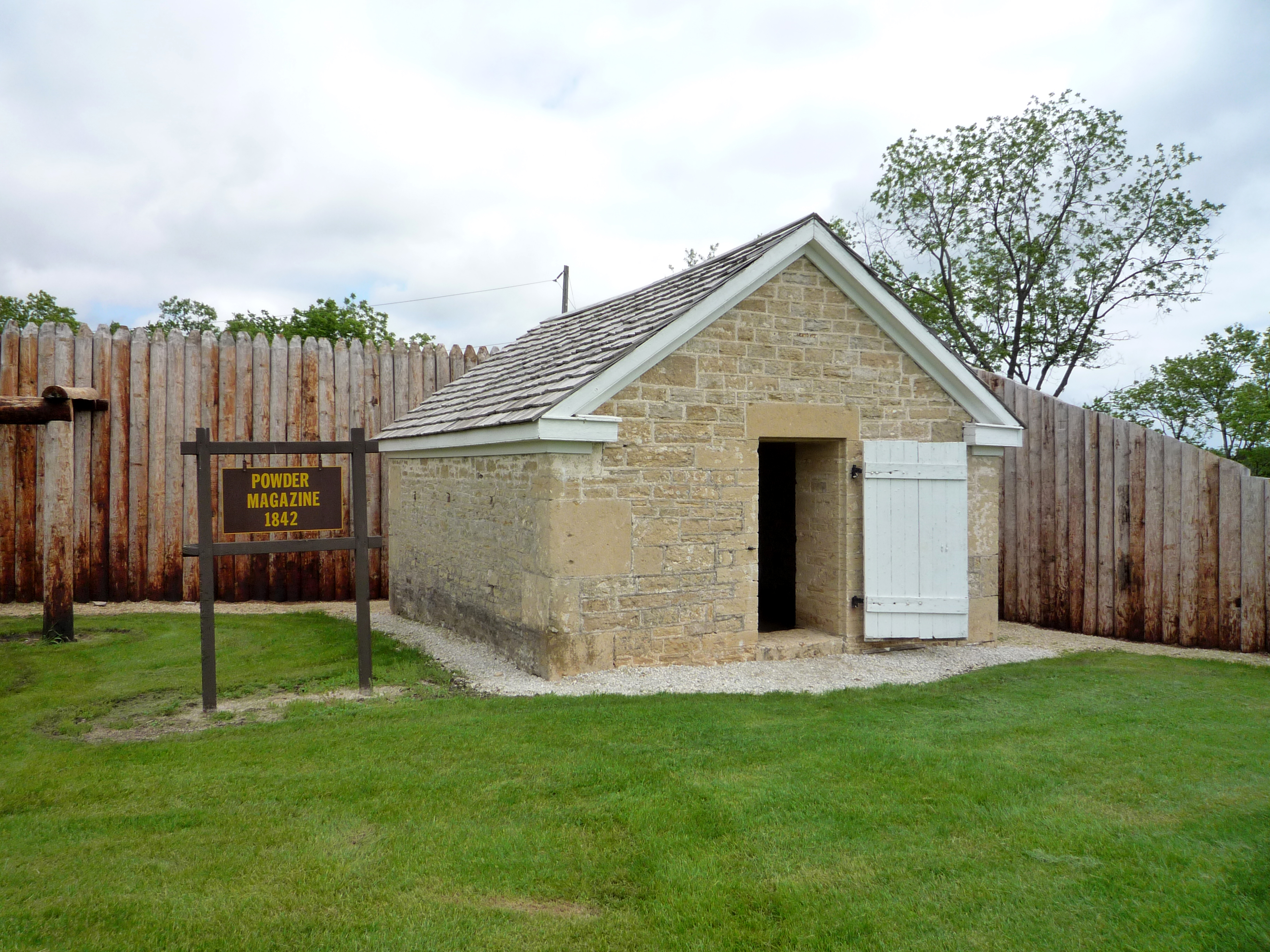
Fort Atkinson

- Fort Atkinson, open to the public
- Fort Des Moines
- Fort Peterson
- Old Fort Madison

== Kansas ==
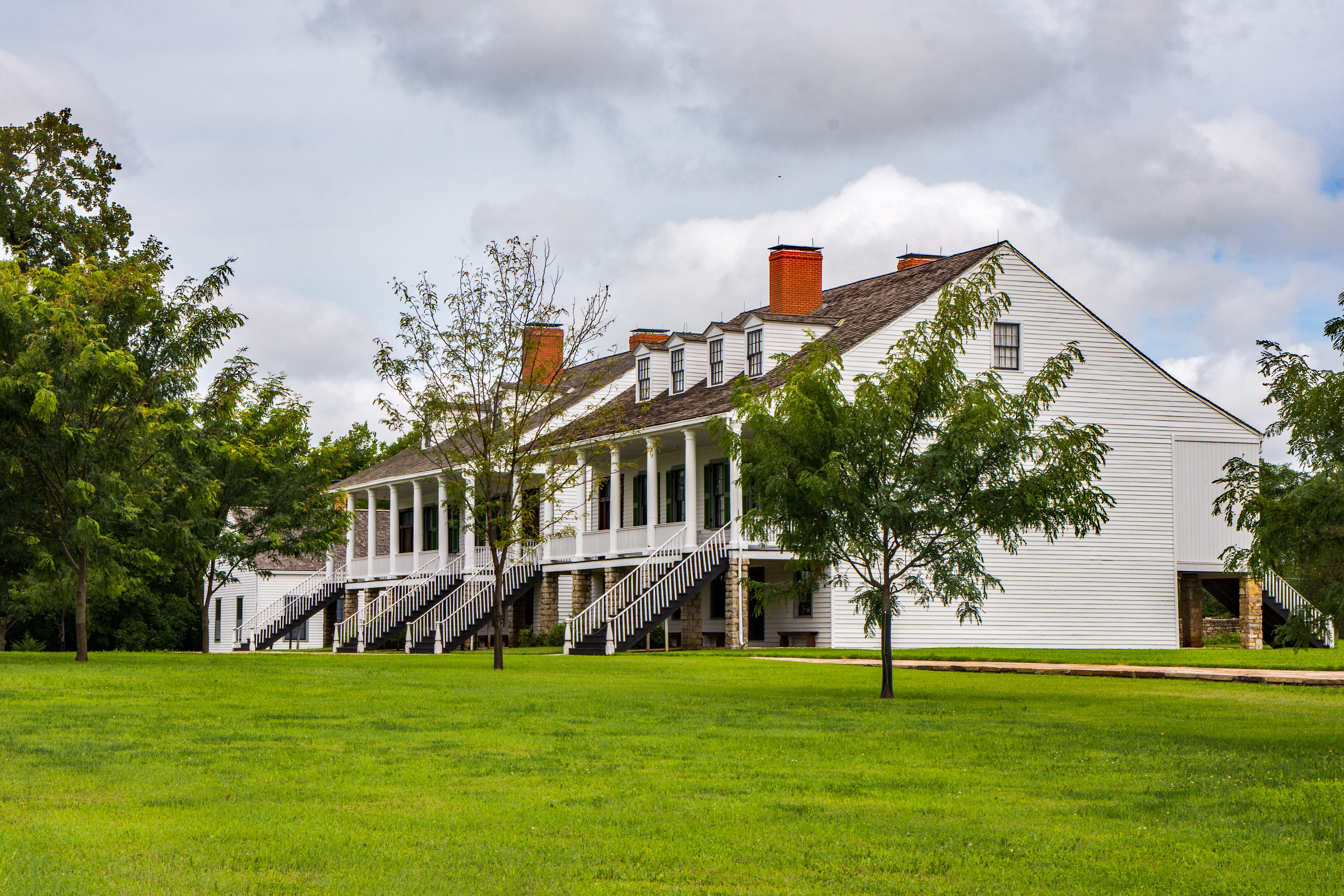
Fort Scott

- Fort Atkinson
- Fort Aubrey
- Fort Bain
- Fort Belmont
- Fort Blair
- Fort Brooks
- Burlingame's Fort
- Fort de Cavagnial
- Fort Clifton
- Fort Dodge
- Fort Drinkwater
- Fort Ellsworth
- Fort Harker, open to the public
- Fort Hays
- Fort Henning
- Fort Insley
- Fort Lane
- Fort Larned, open to the public
- Fort Leavenworth, closed to the public
- Fort Lincoln
- Fort Lookout
- Fort Mann
- Fort McKean
- Fort Montgomery (1855)
- Fort Montgomery (1861)
- Fort Riley, closed to the public
- Fort Row
- Fort Saunders
- Fort Scott, open to the public
- Fort Simple
- Fort Solomon
- Fort Sully
- Fort Titus
- Fort Wakarusa
- Fort Wallace
- Fort Zarah

== Kentucky ==
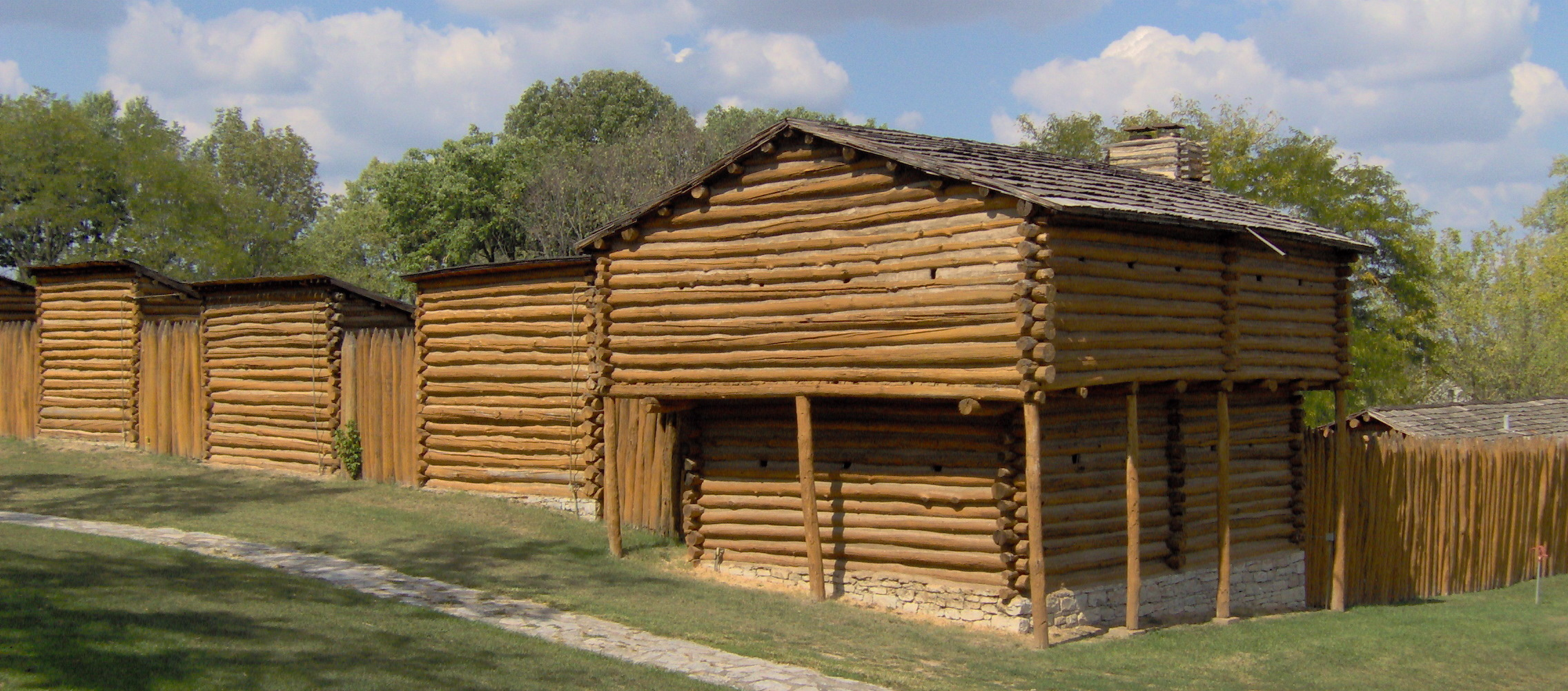
Fort Harrod

- Fort Boonesborough, open to the public
- Fort Campbell, closed to the public
- Fort Harrod, open to the public
- Fort Knox, closed to the public
- Fort Nelson
- Fort William

== Louisiana ==
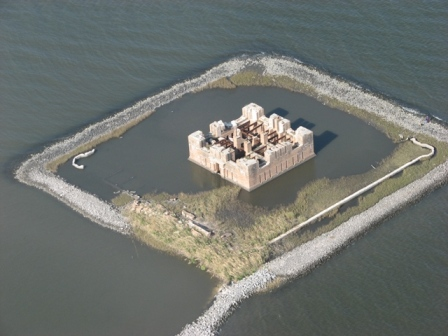
Fort Proctor

- Fort Jackson
- Fort Johnson, closed to the public
- Fort Livingston
- Fort Macomb
- Fort Pike
- Fort Proctor
- Fort St. Philip

== Maine ==
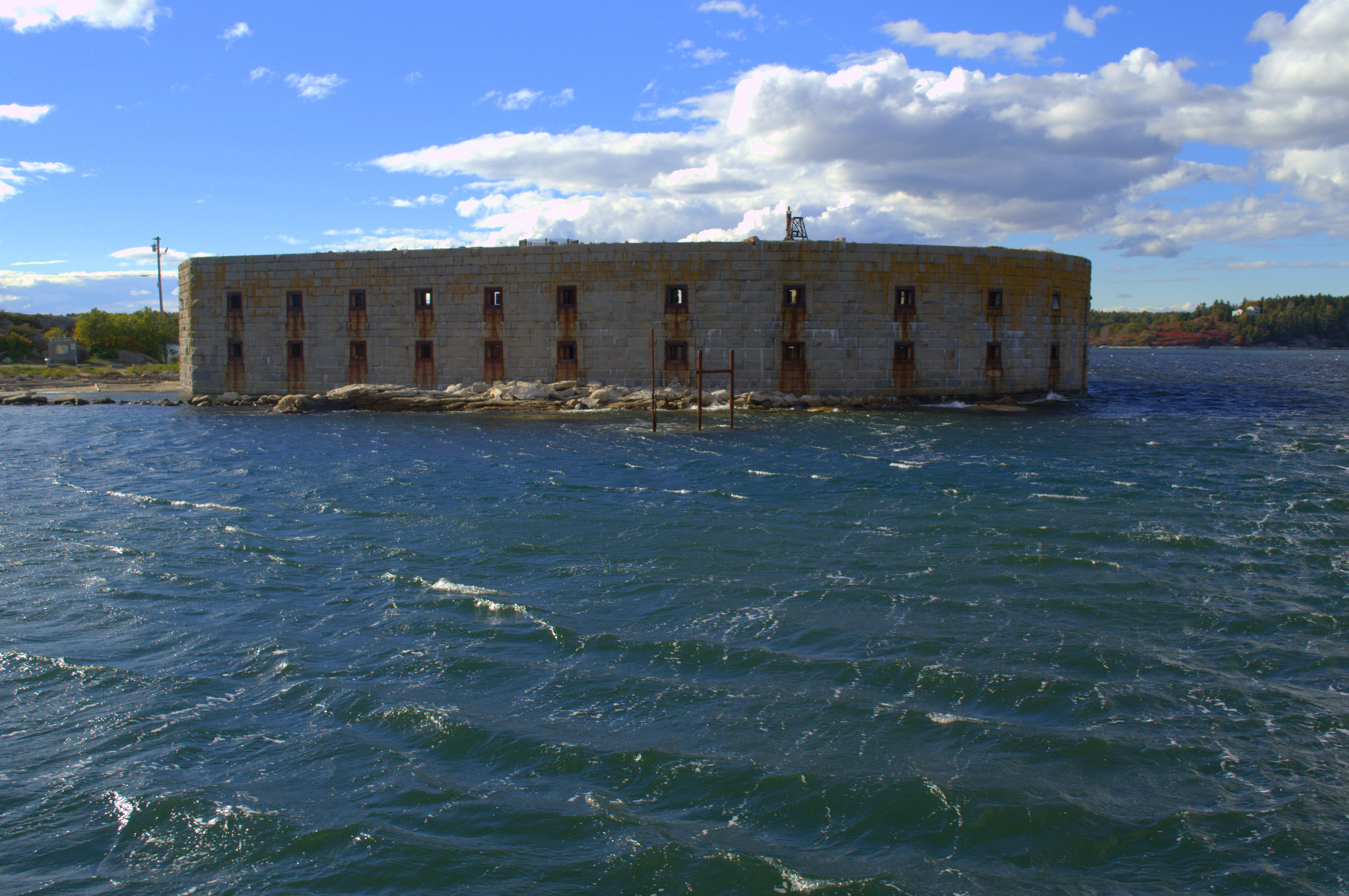
Fort Popham

- Fort Baldwin, open to the public
- Fort Edgecomb, open to the public
- Fort Foster, open to the public
- Fort George, open to the public
- Fort Gorges, open to the public
- Fort Halifax, open to the public
- Fort Kent, open to the public
- Fort Knox, open to the public
- Fort Levett, closed to the public
- Fort Lyon, closed to the public
- Fort McClary, open to the public
- Fort McKinley, closed to the public
- Fort O'Brien, open to the public
- Fort Pentagouet
- Fort Popham, open to the public
- Fort Preble, open to the public
- Fort Scammel, closed to the public
- Fort Sullivan, open to the public
- Fort Sumner, open to the public
- Fort Williams, open to the public
- Fort William Henry, open to the public

== Maryland ==
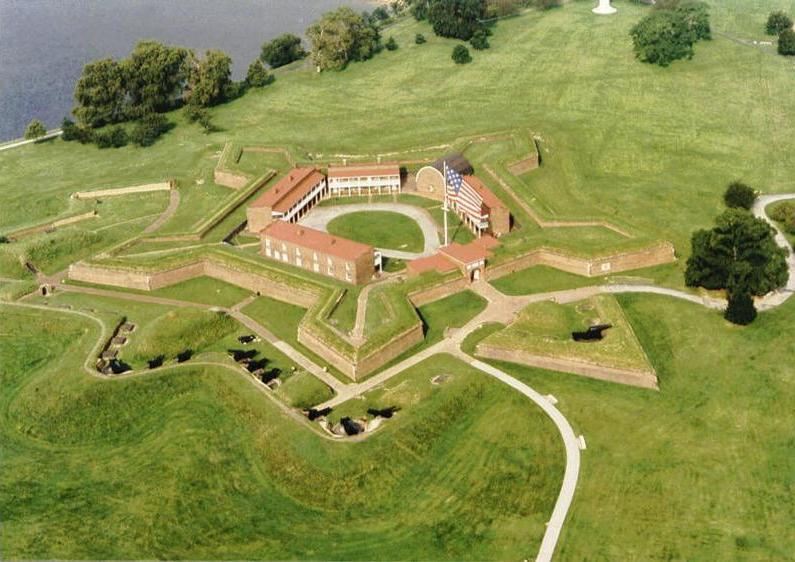
Fort McHenry

- Fort Armistead, open to the public
- Fort Carroll, closed to the public
- Fort Cumberland, demolished
- Fort Defiance, open to the public
- Fort Detrick, closed to the public
- Fort Foote, open to the public
- Fort Frederick, open to the public
- Fort George G. Meade, closed to the public
- Fort Howard, open to the public
- Fort McHenry, open to the public
- Fort Severn, demolished
- Fort Smallwood, open to the public
- Fort Washington, open to the public

== Massachusetts ==
- Acushnet Fort
- Fort Andrew
- Fort Andrews
- Fort Banks
- Fort Dawes
- Fort Defiance
- Fort Devens
- Fort Duvall
- East Point Military Reservation
- Eastern Point Fort
- Fort Heath
- Fort Independence, open to the public
- Long Point Battery
- Fort Miller
- Fort Phoenix
- Fort Pickering
- Fort Revere
- Fort Rodman
- Fort Ruckman
- Fort Sewall
- Stage Fort
- Fort Standish (Boston)
- Fort Standish (Plymouth)
- Fort Strong
- Fort Taber
- Fort Warren, open to the public
- Fort Washington
- Fort Winthrop

== Michigan ==
- Fort de Buade
- Fort Detroit
- Fort Holmes
- Fort Mackinac
- Fort Miami
- Fort Michilimackinac
- Fort St. Joseph (Niles)
- Fort St. Joseph (Port Huron), rebuilt as Fort Gratiot
- Fort Wayne (Detroit)
- Fort Wilkins

== Minnesota ==
- Fort Beauharnois
- Fort Duquesne
- Fort L'Huillier
- Fort Ridgely
- Fort Ripley
- Fort St. Charles
- Fort Snelling

== Mississippi ==
- Fort Massachusetts
- Fort Maurepas

== Missouri ==
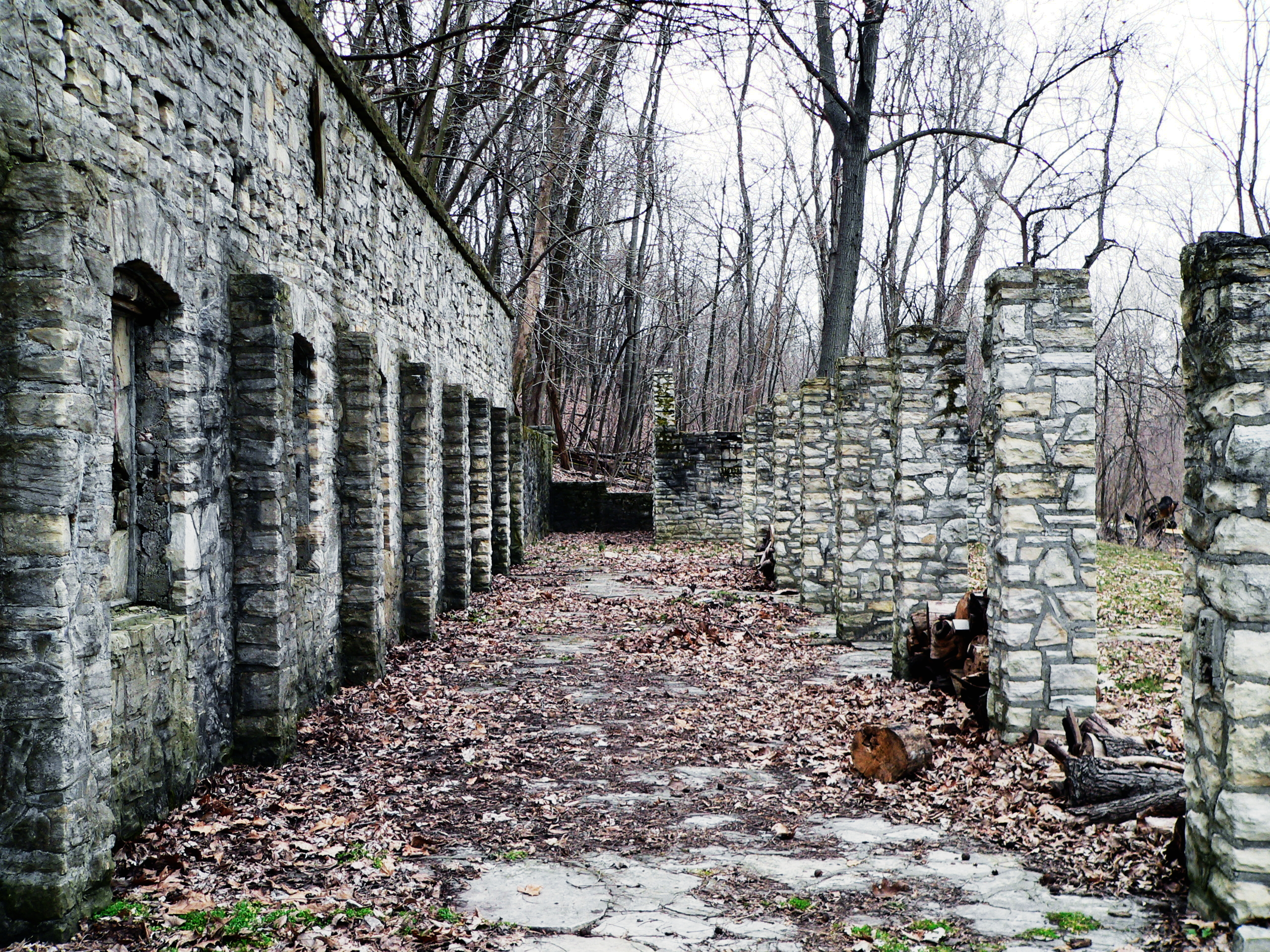
Fort Belle Fontaine

- Fort Belle Fontaine, open to the public
- Fort Cap au Gris
- Fort Crowder
- Fort Leonard Wood, closed to the public
- Fort Osage, open to the public
- Jefferson Barracks, open to the public

== Montana ==
- Fort Assinniboine
- Fort C. F. Smith
- Fort Ellis
- Fort Keogh
- Fort Parker
- Fort William Henry Harrison
- Fort Missoula
- Fort Benton

== Nebraska ==
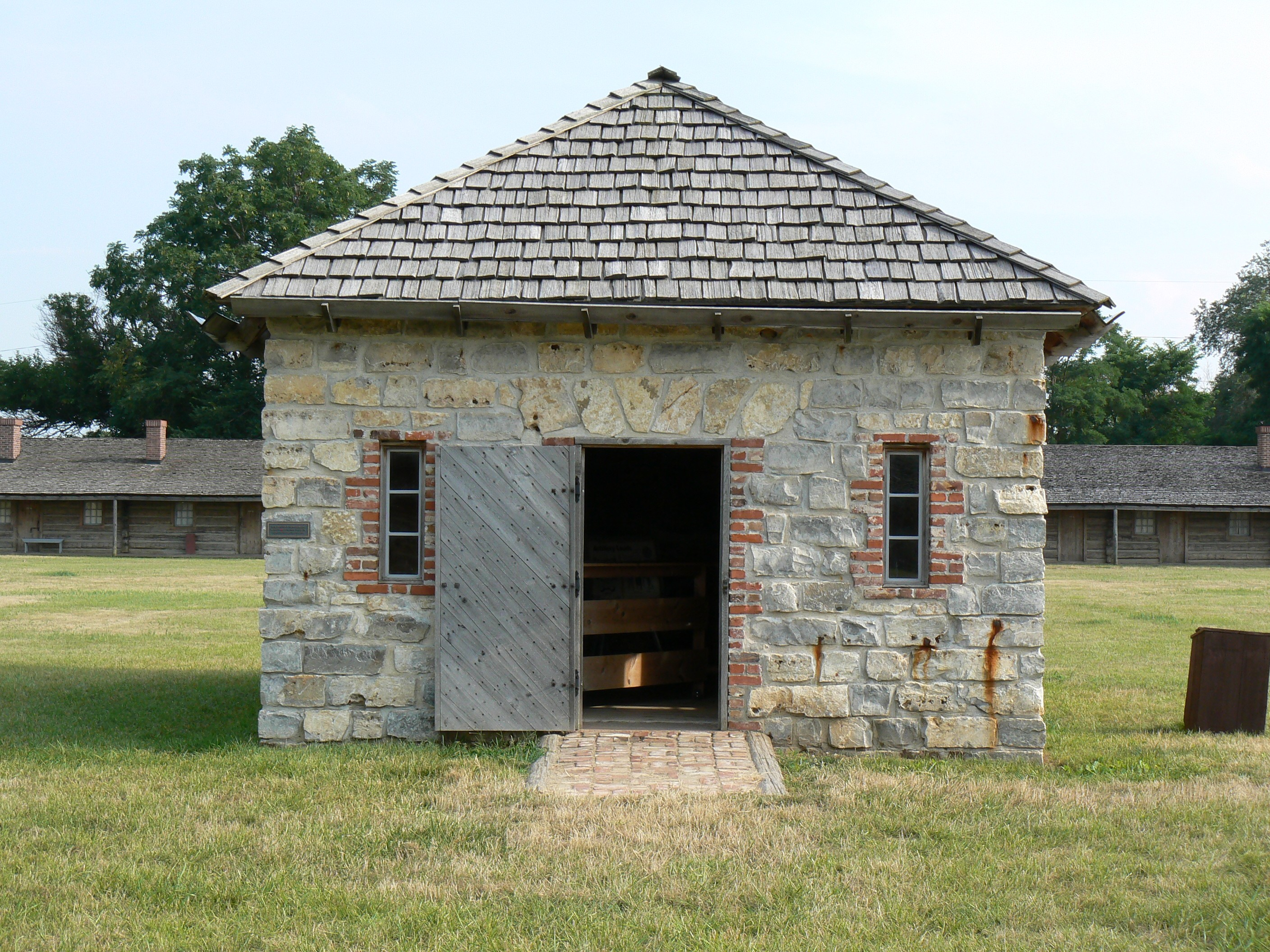
Fort Atkinson

- Fort Atkinson, open to the public
- Fort Hartsuff, open to the public
- Fort Kearny, open to the public
- Fort Lisa
- Fort McPherson, open to the public
- Fort Mitchell
- Fort Niobrara
- Fort Omaha
- Fort Robinson, open to the public
- Fort Sidney, open to the public

== Nevada ==
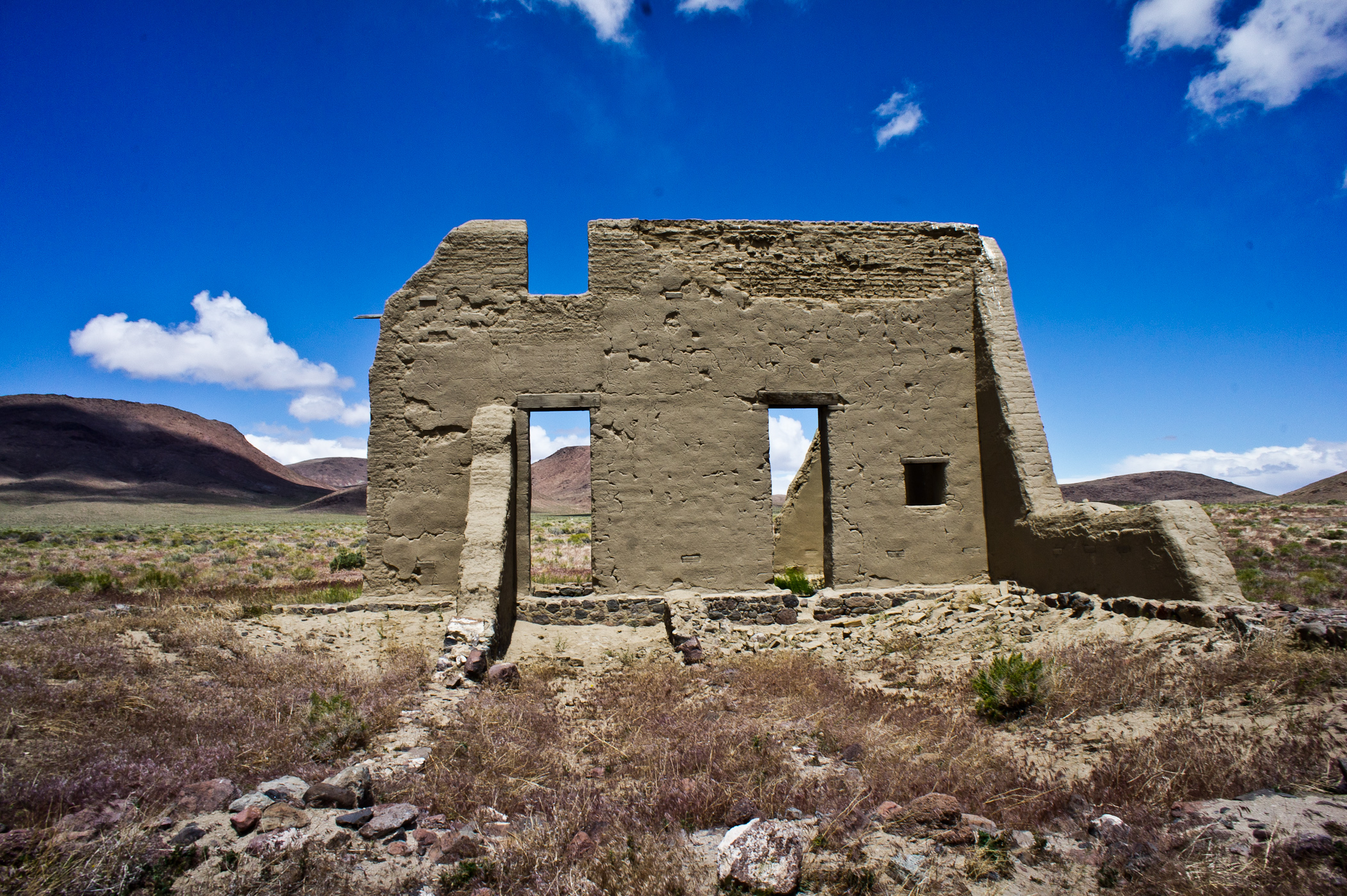
Fort Churchill

- Fort Churchill, open to the public

== New Hampshire ==
- Fort Constitution, open to the public
- Fort at Number 4, open to the public
- Fort Dearborn
- Fort Stark
- Fort Washington
- Fort Wentworth
- Fort William and Mary

== New Jersey ==
- Fort Billingsport
- Cape May Military Reservation
- Fort Dix
- Highlands Military Reservation
- Fort Lee
- Fort Hancock
- Fort Mercer
- Fort Monmouth
- Fort Mott
- Fortifications of New Netherland
- Fort Nonsense

== New Mexico ==
- Fort Bascom
- Fort Bayard
- Fort Craig
- Fort Cummings
- Fort Fillmore
- Fort Marcy
- Fort McRae
- Fort Selden
- Fort Stanton
- Fort Sumner
- Fort Thorn
- Fort Tularosa
- Fort Union
- Fort Wingate

== New York ==
- Fort Amsterdam
- Castle Clinton
- Fort Clinton
- Fort Columbus
- Fort Crown Point
- Fort Drum
- Fort Edward
- Fort Gansevoort
- Fort Gibson
- Fort Greene
- Fort Hamilton
- Camp Hero
- Fort Jay
- Fort Lafayette
- Fort Lévis
- Madison Barracks
- Fort Michie
- Fort Montgomery (1776)
- Fort Montgomery (1844)
- Forts of New Netherland
- Fort Niagara
- Fort Ontario
- Fort de La Présentation
- Fort Schuyler
- Fort Slocum
- Fort Stanwix, open to the public
- Fort Terry
- Fort Ticonderoga
- Fort Tilden
- Fort Tompkins (1812)
- Fort Tompkins (1812)
- Fort Tompkins (1814)
- Fort Tompkins (1847)
- Fort Totten
- Fort Tyler
- Fort Wadsworth
- Fort Washington
- Battery Weed
- Fort William Henry
- Castle Williams
- Fort Wood
- Fort H. G. Wright

== North Carolina ==
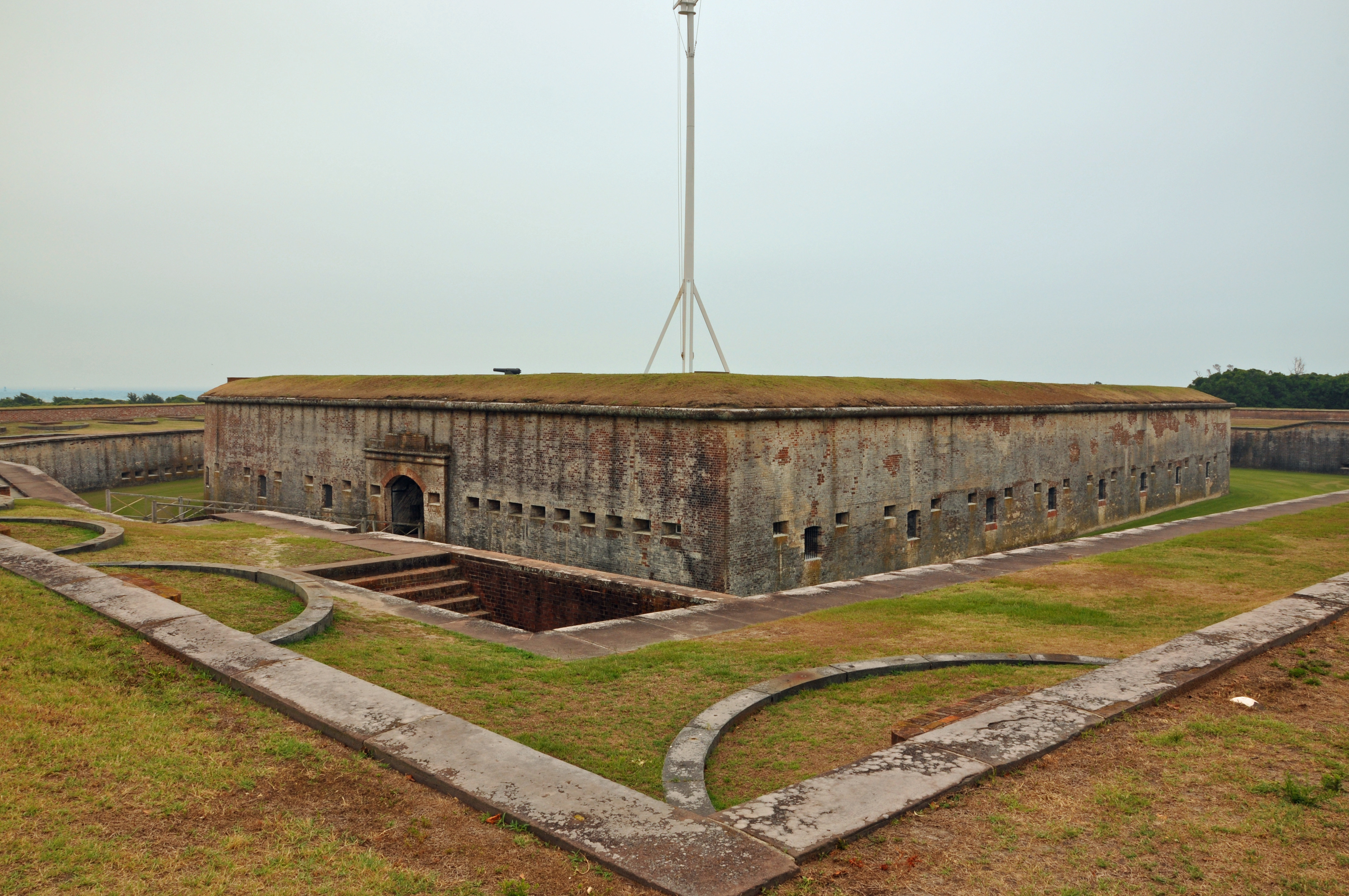
Fort Macon

- Fort Anderson, open to the public
- Fort Caswell, closed to the public
- Fort Dobbs, open to the public
- Fort Fisher, open to the public
- Fort Greene
- Fort Hampton, open to the public
- Fort Johnston, open to the public
- Fort Bragg, closed to the public
- Fort Macon, open to the public

== North Dakota ==
- Fort Abercrombie
- Fort Abraham Lincoln
- Fort Buford
- Fort Clark
- Fort Mandan
- Fort Ransom
- Fort Rice
- Fort Stevenson
- Fort Totten
- Fort Union

== Ohio ==
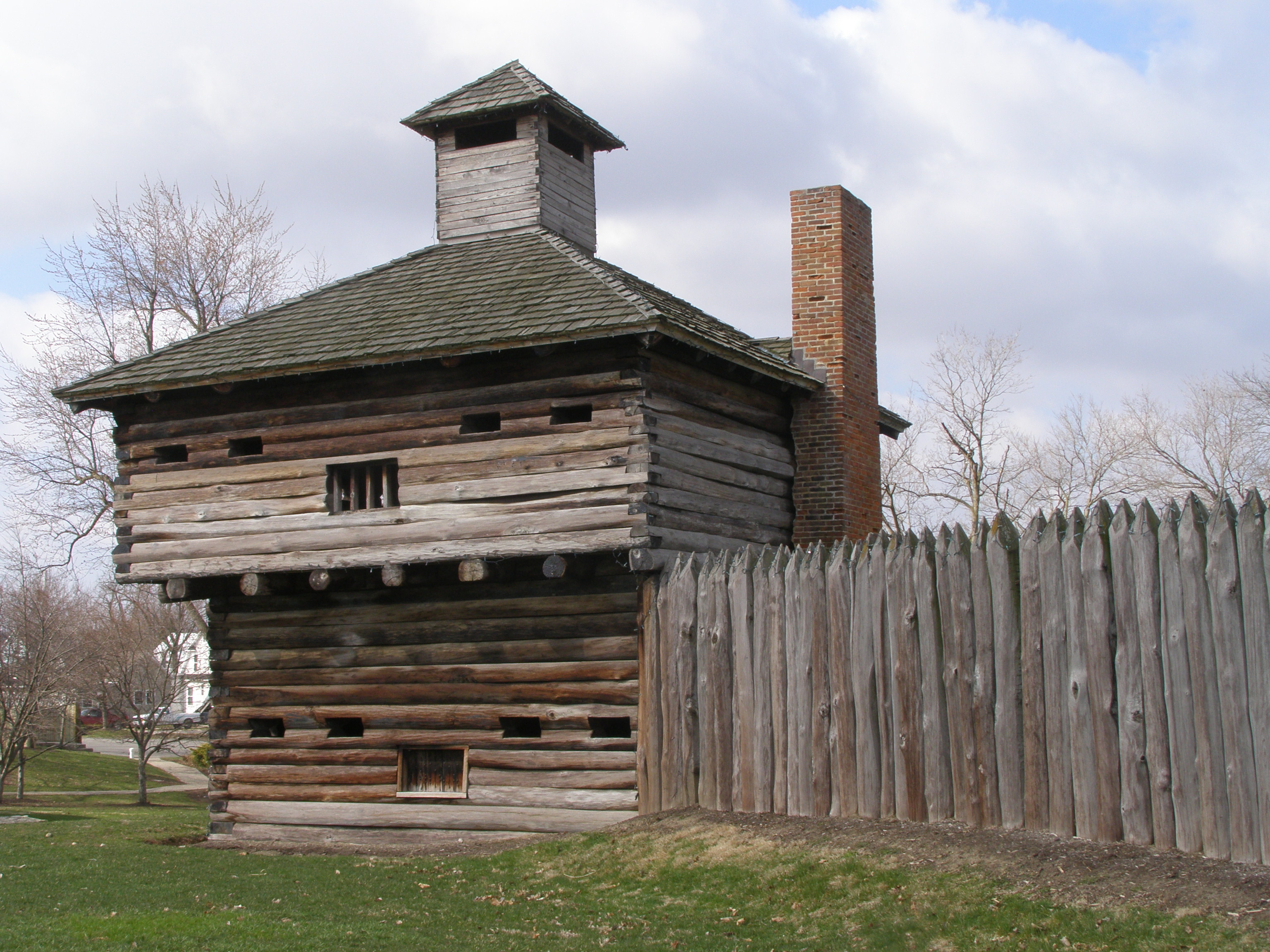
Fort Recovery

- Fort Defiance, open to the public
- Fort Deposit
- Fort Findlay
- Fort Frye
- Fort Harmar
- Fort Hayes
- Fort Jefferson
- Fort Laurens, open to the public
- Fort Meigs, open to the public
- Fort Miamis
- Fort Recovery, open to the public
- Fort St. Clair
- Fort Sandoské (1750)
- Fort Sandusky (1761)
- Fort Stephenson
- Fort Steuben, open to the public
- Fort Washington

== Oklahoma ==
- Fort Arbuckle
- Fort Cobb
- Fort Coffee
- Fort Gibson
- Camp Gruber
- Fort McCulloch
- Fort Nichols
- Fort Reno
- Fort Sill
- Fort Supply
- Fort Towson
- Fort Washita
- Fort Wayne

== Oregon ==
- Fort Astoria
- Fort Clatsop
- Fort Dalles
- Fort Hoskins
- Fort Klamath
- Fort Lane
- Fort Stevens
- Fort William
- Fort Yamhill

== Pennsylvania ==
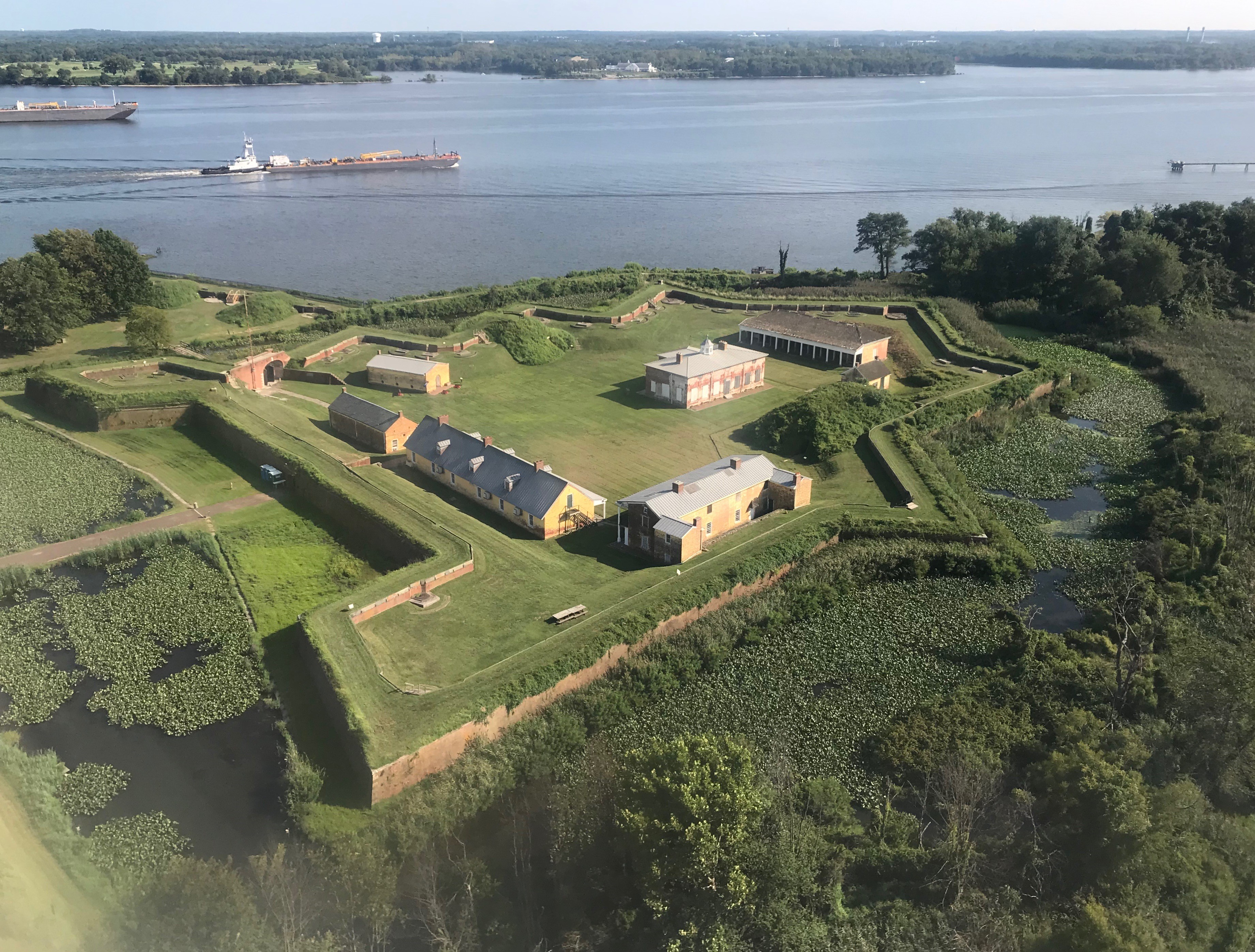
Fort Mifflin

- Fort Allen (Carbon County, Pennsylvania), abandoned
- Fort Allen (Westmoreland County, Pennsylvania), abandoned
- Fort Armstrong, abandoned
- Fort Augusta, destroyed
- Fort Bedford, partially reconstructed, open to the public
- Fort Bigham, destroyed
- Carlisle Fort, abandoned
- Fort Chambers, abandoned
- Fort Depuy, returned to its original owners
- Fort Deshler, abandoned
- Fort Duquesne, destroyed
- Fort Franklin (Schuylkill County, Pennsylvania), abandoned
- Fort Franklin (Venango County, Pennsylvania), abandoned
- Fort Granville, destroyed
- Fort Halifax, destroyed
- Fort Hamilton (Pennsylvania), abandoned
- Fort Henry, abandoned
- Fort Hunter, abandoned
- Fort Hyndshaw, abandoned
- Fort Jones, destroyed
- Fort Juniata Crossing, abandoned
- Fort Laughlin, destroyed
- Fort Lebanon, abandoned
- Fort Le Boeuf, destroyed
- Light's Fort, under renovation
- Fort Ligonier, reconstructed, open to the public
- Fort Loudoun, reconstructed, open to the public
- Fort Lyttleton, destroyed
- Fort Machault, destroyed
- Fort Manada, destroyed
- Fort Martin, abandoned
- Fort Manada, abandoned
- Fort McCord, destroyed
- McDowell's Mill, abandoned
- Fort McIntosh, destroyed
- Mercer's Fort, destroyed
- Fort Mifflin, open to the public
- Fort Morris (Pennsylvania), abandoned
- Fort Necessity, destroyed
- Fort Norris, abandoned
- Fort Northkill, abandoned
- Fort Pitt, partially reconstructed, open to the public
- Fort Presque Isle, destroyed
- Fort Prince George, destroyed
- Fort Robert Smalls, destroyed
- Fort Roberdeau, reconstructed, open to the public
- Fort Robinson, abandoned
- Fort Shirley, abandoned
- Fort Swatara, abandoned
- Fort Venango, destroyed
- Heinrich Zeller House, open to the public

== Puerto Rico ==
- Fort Amezquita
- Fort Buchanan, Puerto Rico
- El Cañuelo
- Fort San Cristóbal (Puerto Rico)
- Fort San Felipe del Morro
- Fortín de San Gerónimo
- Fuerte de Vieques

== Rhode Island ==
Fort Greene

- Fort Adams, open to the public
- Fort Barton, open to the public
- Fort Burnside, open to the public
- Fort Church
- Fort Dumpling, open to the public
- Fort Getty, open to the public
- Fort Greble
- Fort Greene (1794), abandoned
- Fort Greene (1943)
- Fort Hamilton
- Fort Kearny, open to the public
- Fort Mansfield, open to the public
- Fort Ninigret, open to the public
- Queen's Fort, open to the public
- Fort Varnum
- Fort Wetherill, open to the public
- Fort Wolcott, destroyed

== South Carolina ==
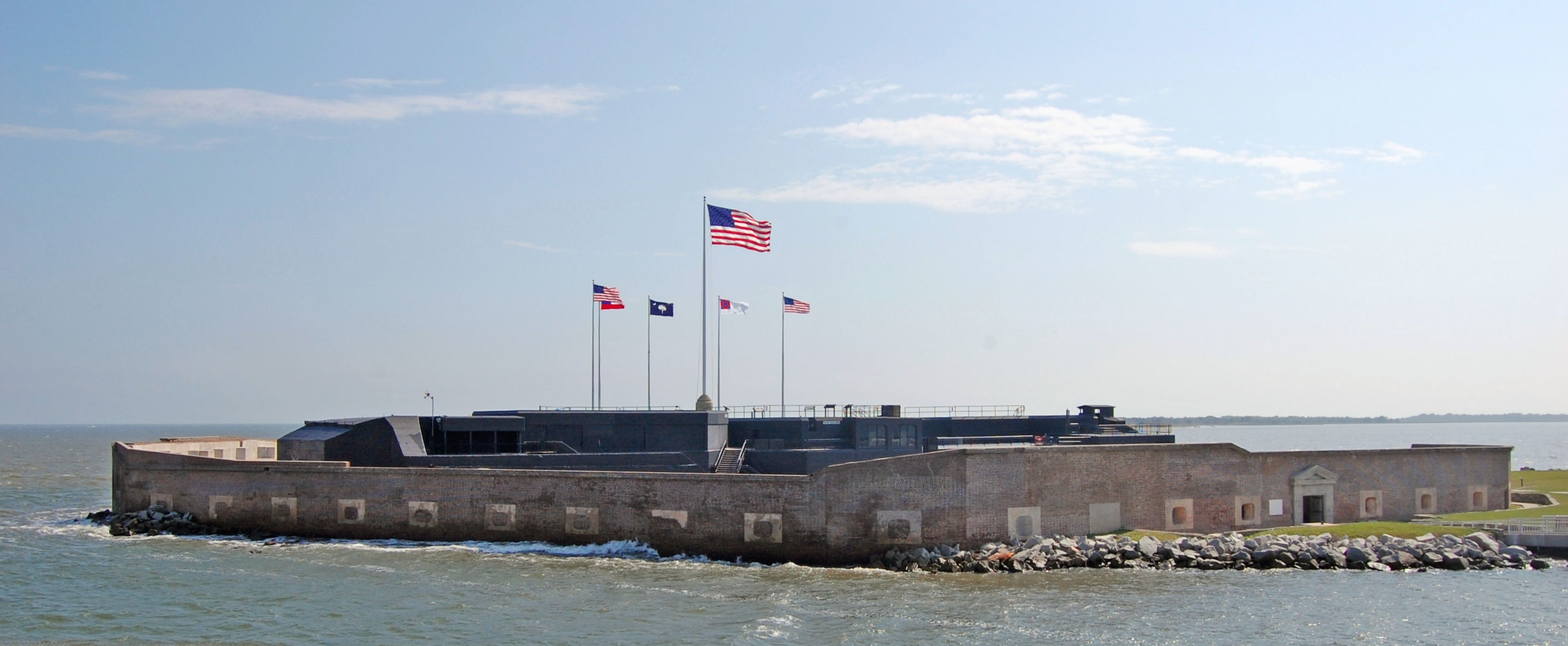
Fort Sumter

- The Battery
- Fort Charlotte
- Fort Fremont
- Fort Howell
- Fort Jackson
- Fort Johnson
- Fort Lyttelton
- Fort Motte
- Fort Moultrie
- Old Ninety Six and Star Fort
- Castle Pinckney
- Fort Prince George
- Fort Sumter
- Fort Wagner
- Fort Walker

== South Dakota ==
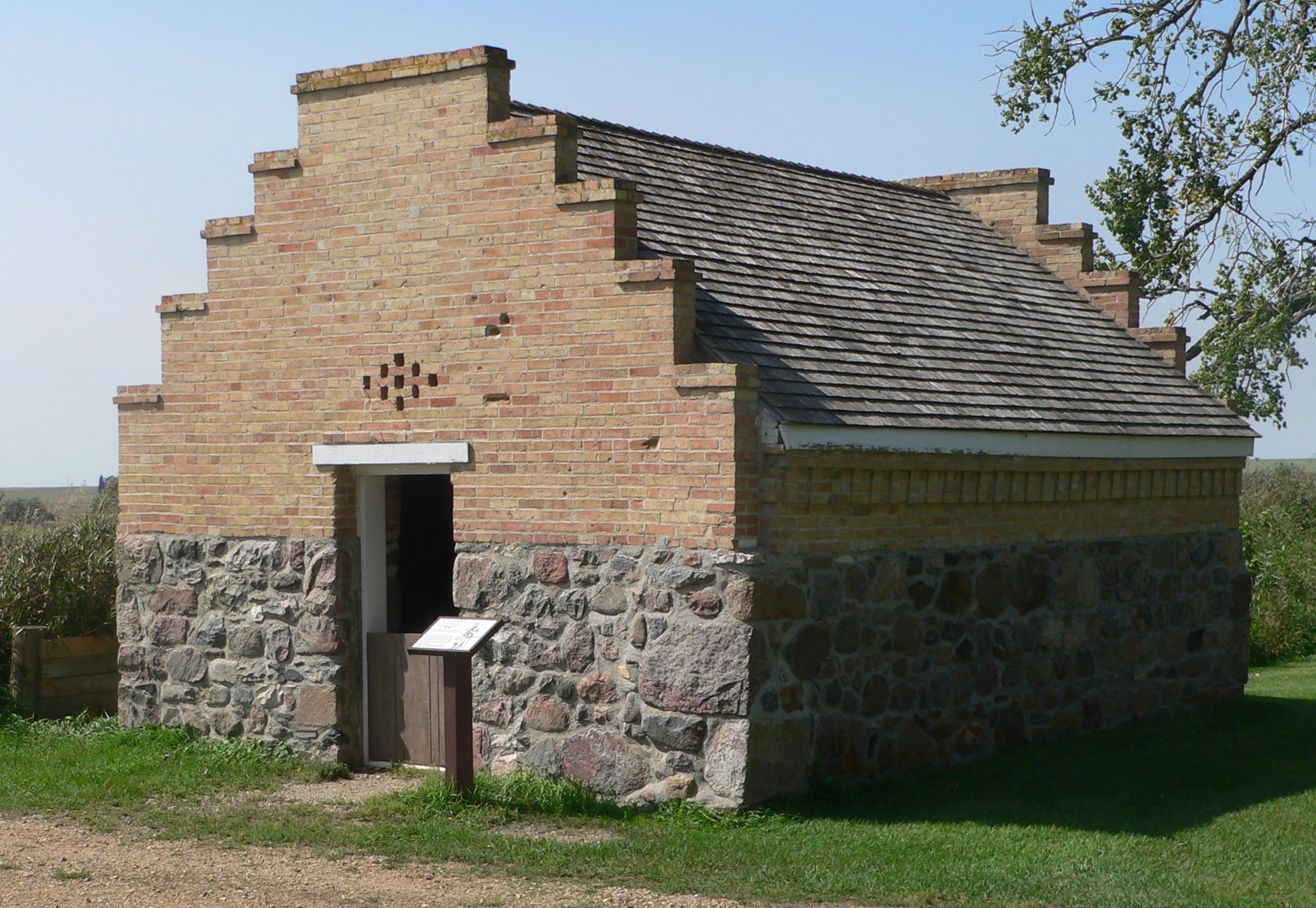
Fort Sisseton

- Fort Bennett
- Fort James, abandoned
- Fort Meade, abandoned
- Fort Randall, open to the public
- Fort Sisseton, open to the public
- Fort Sully, abandoned

== Texas ==
- The Alamo
- Fort Bliss
- Fort Brown
- Fort Cavazos
- Fort Concho
- Fort Crockett
- Fort D. A. Russell
- Fort Davis
- Fort Saint Louis
- Fort San Jacinto
- Fort Travis
- Fort Worth

== Utah ==
- Fort Buenaventura
- Cove Fort
- Fort Cameron
- Fort Deseret
- Fort Douglas
- Fort Duchesne
- Fort Utah

== Vermont ==
- Brattleboro Barracks
- Champlain Arsenal
- Chimney Point
- Fort Dummer
- Fort Ethan Allen
- Fort Frederick
- Fort Independence, located on Mount Independence
- Fort Mott
- Fort Ranger
- Fort Sainte Anne
- Fort Warren

== Virginia ==
- Fort Albany
- Fort Barfoot
- Fort Boykin
- Craney Island Fort
- Fort Defiance
- Fort Ethan Allen
- Fort Eustis
- Fort Huger
- Fort Hunt
- Fort John Custis
- Fort Gregg-Adams
- Fort Loudoun
- Fort Monroe
- Fort Nelson
- Fort Norfolk
- Fort Myer
- Fort Pocahontas
- Fort Powhatan
- Fort Richardson
- Battery Rodgers
- Fort Scott
- Fort Story
- Fort Vause
- Fort Walker
- Fort Ward
- Fort Wool

== Virgin Islands (U.S.) ==
- Fort Christian
- Fort Frederik
- Fort Segarra

== Washington ==
- Fort Canby
- Fort Casey, open to the public
- Fort Columbia, open to the public
- Fort Colville
- Fort Dent
- Fort Ebey
- Fort Flagler
- Fort George Wright
- Camp Hayden, open to the public
- Fort Lawton
- Fort Lewis
- Fort Nez Percés
- Fort Nisqually, rebuilt as a living history museum
- Fort Okanogan
- Fort Simcoe, open to the public
- Fort Spokane
- Fort Steilacoom, open to the public
- Fort Townsend
- Fort Vancouver, open to the public
- Fort Walla Walla, open to the public
- Fort Ward, open to the public
- Fort Whitman
- Fort Worden, open to the public

== Washington, D.C. ==
- Fort DeRussy
- Fort McNair
- Fort Stevens
- Fort Totten, open to the public

== West Virginia ==
- Fort Ashby
- Fort Milroy
- Fort Pearsall
- Prickett's Fort
- Fort Randolph

== Wisconsin ==
- Fort Crawford
- Fort Howard
- Fort McCoy
- Fort Shelby/Fort McKay
- Fort Winnebago

== Wyoming ==
- Fort Bridger
- Camp Brown
- Fort Caspar
- Fort D.A. Russell
- Fort Fetterman
- Fort Fred Steele
- Fort Halleck
- Fort Laramie
- Fort Phil Kearny
- Fort Platte
- Fort Reno
- Fort Sanders
- Camp Stambaugh
- Fort Supply
- Fort Washakie
- Fort Yellowstone

== See also ==
- List of forts (worldwide)
- List of coastal fortifications of the United States
- List of United States Army installations
- List of fortifications
- List of castles
