= Fort Lincoln blockhouse =

Coordinates: 37.8409°N 94.7130°W

Sometime in 1864 a large log blockhouse was removed from Fort Lincoln, Kansas, (see Fort Lincoln (Kansas)) and was relocated to the town of Fort Scott, Kansas. This blockhouse was placed at the intersection of Lowman and First streets. Probably a stockade, possibly also removed from Fort Lincoln, was erected around the blockhouse.

This structure was moved to help guard the town and military post of Fort Scott. It was under the jurisdiction of the post and helped guard the area, along with Forts Blair, Henning and Insley (see Fort Blair (Fort Scott), Fort Henning and Fort Insley). All four structures were in place to protect the area when Maj. Gen. Sterling Price's forces skirted town in October 1864 during the Confederate retreat during Price's Missouri Raid.

The Fort Lincoln blockhouse was probably torn down after Fort Scott's post was deactivated in 1865, as it was no longer needed when the threat of war had passed.
