= Jeremiah Anderson (abolitionist) =

American abolitionist

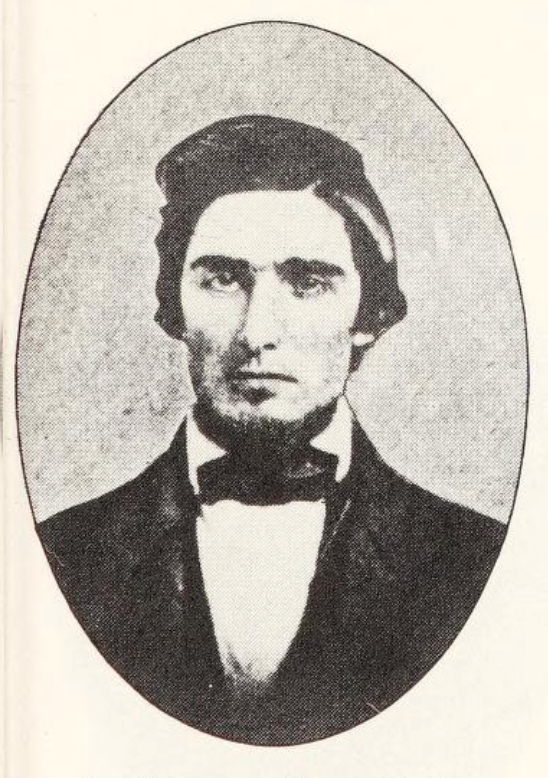
Jeremiah Goldsmith Anderson

Jeremiah Anderson (April 17, 1833 – October 16, 1859) was an American abolitionist. Born in Indiana, Anderson left Yellow Springs, Iowa to attend Knox Academy in Galesburg, Illinois. He initially intended to become a minister, but worked in a sawmill before moving to Kansas Territory in 1857. He fought with freestaters James Montgomery and John Brown against those who fought as vigorously for slavery. Intending to free enslaved people, Anderson participated in John Brown's raid on Harpers Ferry (October 16 to 18, 1859), where he was mortally wounded.

== Early life ==
Jeremiah Goldsmith Anderson was born in Indiana on April 17, 1833. He was the son of John Anderson and Anna Westfall, the daughter of Colonel Jacob Westfall, of Tygert Valley, Virginia. Jacob Westfall, who fought in the American Revolutionary War, and John's parents were slaveholders.

Anderson attended school in Kossuth County, Iowa. He lived in Yellow Springs, Des Moines County, Iowa in 1850. (Note: The census says he was 19 years old, but he would have been 17. The census also said he was in school in 1850.) His mother, Anna, who was born in Virginia, was a farmer and the head of the household. He had an older brother, John Q., 30, who was born in Kentucky; an older sister Mary Jane, 24, who was born in Indiana; and an older brother, Harrison, 20, also born in Indiana. They lived next to Levi Anderson, 32, born in Hardin County, Kentucky, who had his own family. (Note: John and Anna Westfall Anderson were married in Hardin County, Kentucky on April 2, 1807.)

== Education and career ==
Anderson moved to Galesburg, Illinois with his brother, Harrison, and sister, Mary Jane, when he was 18 years of age. (Note: He was closest in age to Harrison and Mary Jane.) They each spent a year (1851–1852) attending Knox Academy, a secondary school affiliated with Knox College.

Anderson initially wanted to become a minister, but had an experience that quashed that aspiration. He worked at some point as a farmer, and a peddler. After college, Anderson worked for a saw mill company.

== Kansas ==
In August 1857, Anderson moved to Kansas and settled on land near Fort Bain in Bourbon County, Kansas on the Little Osage River. He served under Captain James Montgomery in Kansas.

At that time, there was tension between the people that supported slavery and the freestaters. Anderson spent 10 months imprisoned at Fort Scott after he battled border ruffians, also called "bloody ruffians", from Missouri. He escaped and joined John Brown's forces, during which he participated on a raid to free people from Missouri who were enslaved. Anderson expressed his commitment to fight for enslaved people in a letter,

Millions of fellow-beings require it of us; their cries for help go out to the universe daily and hourly. Whose duty is it to help them? Is it yours? Is it mine? It is every man's, but how few there are to help. But there are a few who dare to answer this call and dare to answer it in a manner that will make this land of liberty and equality shake to the centre.

— Jeremiah Anderson, July 5, 1859 in John Brown and the Shadow of the Valley

== Raid on Harpers Ferry ==
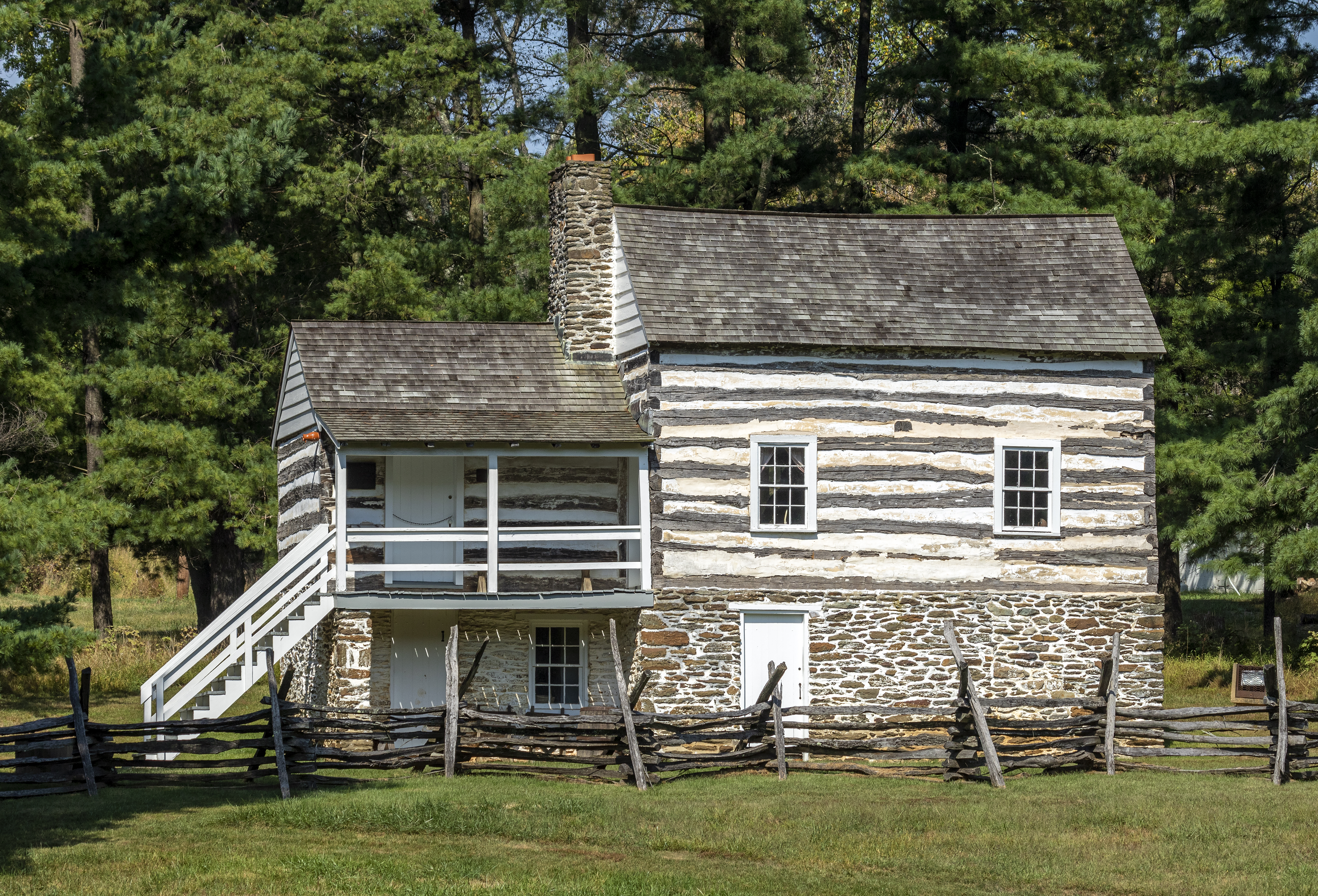
Kennedy Farmhouse, Sharpsburg, Maryland about five miles north of Harpers Ferry, West Virginia

Anderson traveled on June 20, 1859, with four others towards Chambersburg, Pennsylvania to establish a command center to prepare for the raid on Harpers Ferry. With him were John Henry Kagi, John Brown, and his sons Owen and Oliver.

A local man, Watson, a free black man who operated along the Underground Railroad, helped the men make connections with trustworthy white people. Kagi managed the receipt of weapons and other raiders in Chambersburg. Brown rented a farm outside of town and up to five miles from Harpers Ferry. Materials were brought to the farm and the remainder of Brown's forces arrived at the farm, called Kennedy Farmhouse, that became their "base of operations". Brown's daughter and daughter-in-law, Anne and Martha, Oliver's wife prepared food and kept the house for the men from August and throughout the rest of the summer and the month of September. They were sent home prior to the raid.

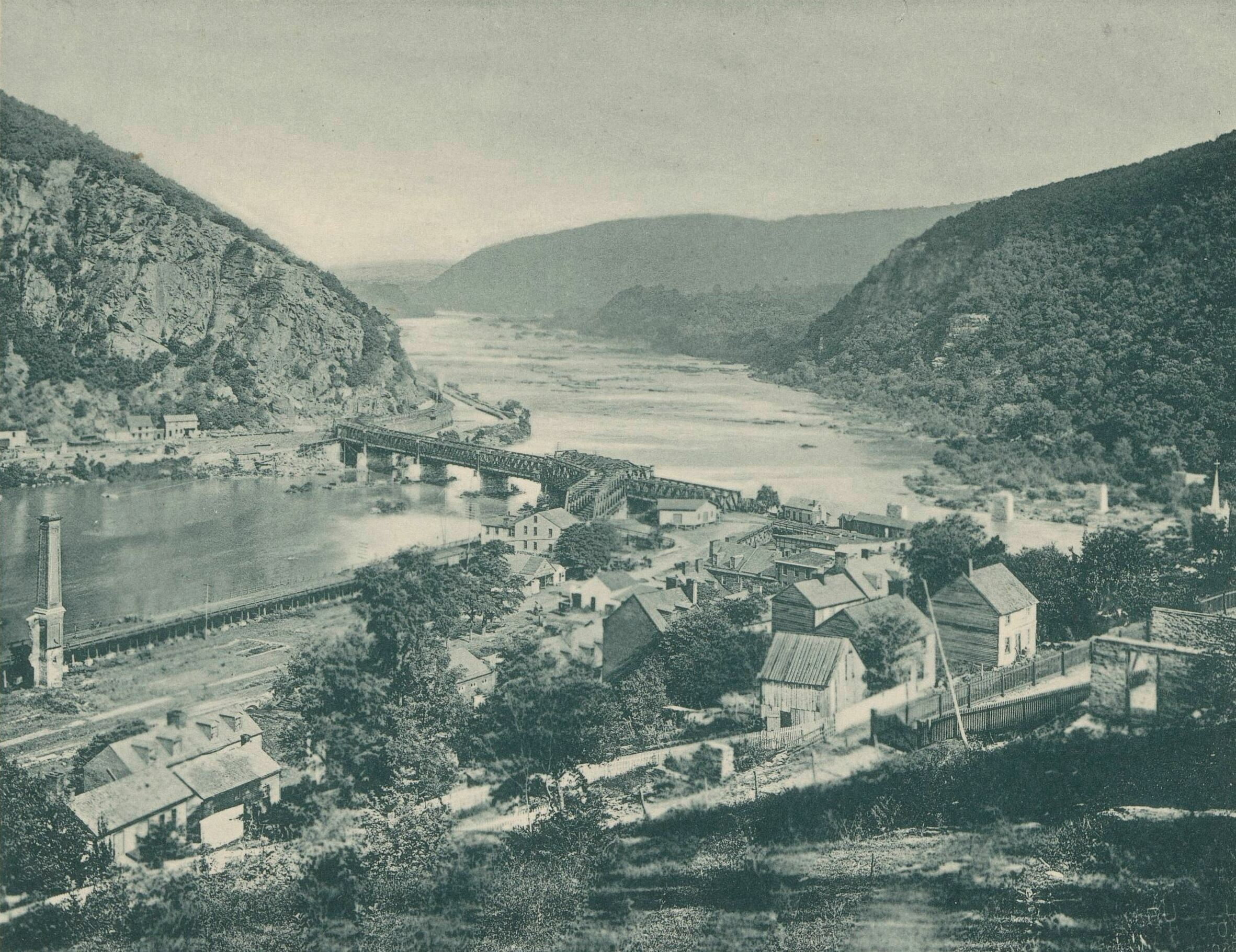
Harpers Ferry and the Potomac, Baltimore & Ohio Railroad

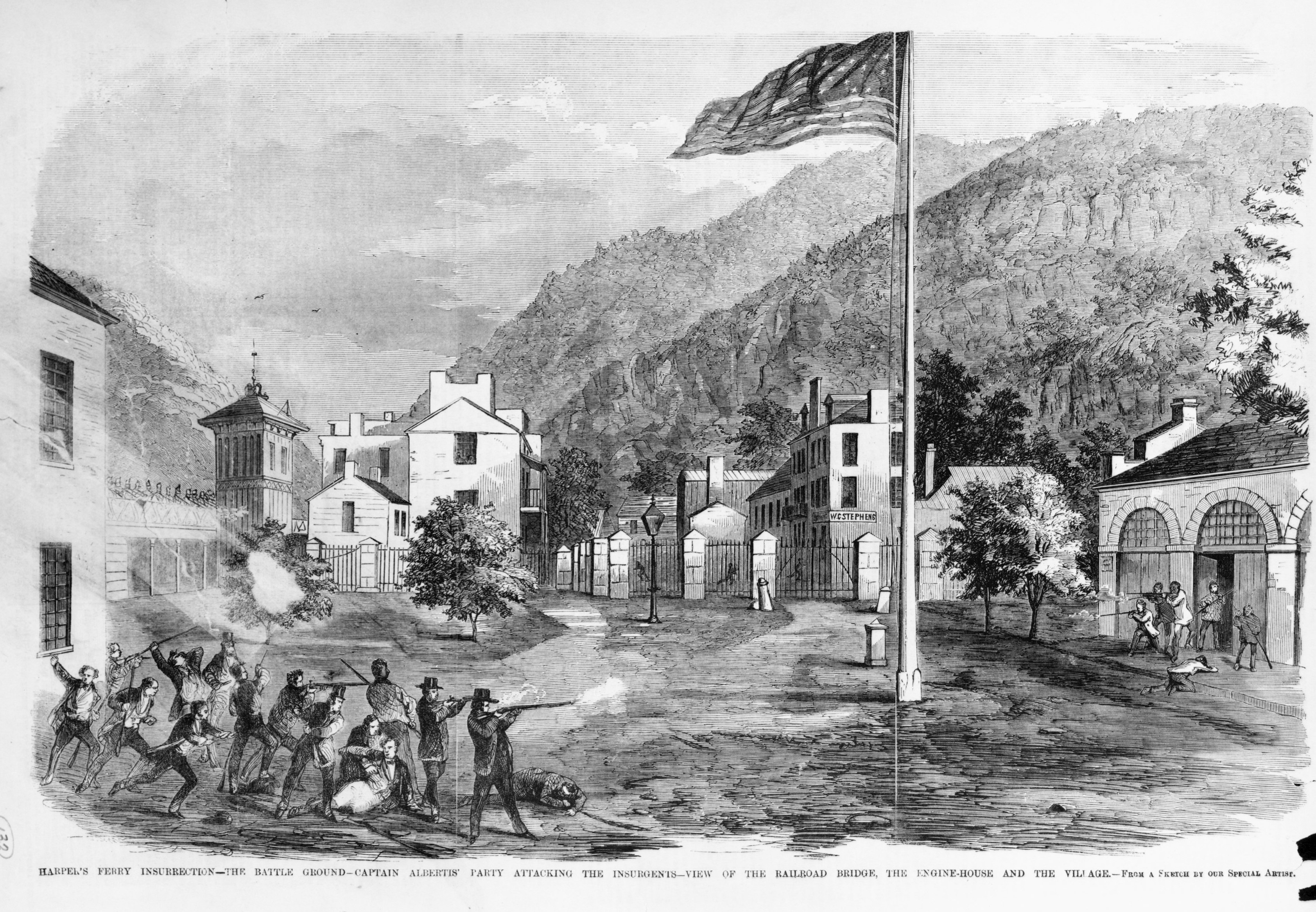
The battleground of John Brown's raid on Harpers Ferry

Assignments were made about where the men would be positions and their responsibility for the raid beginning the night of October 16, 1859. Anderson was stationed at the Armory's engine house with Daulphin Thompson. The objective was to take the armory, the arsenal, the town, and then the rifle factory. Then, they wanted to free all the slaves in Harpers Ferry. The men marched into Harpers Ferry, disconnecting the telegraph wire to Washington, D.C. and with the intention to take prisoners who disobeyed them and to fight only in self-defense. Residents noticed when Brown and his soldiers broke into the armory and alerted other townspeople. In the meantime, the rifle factory was possessed, some people were taken prisoner, but no one was shot. Aaron Dwight Stevens informed enslaved people that he saw on the road of the raid and stated that they were free. African Americans congregated at the armory and arsenal. Stevens led Anderson, Green, and Leary to the plantation of Lewis Washington, who was related to George Washington and had been a friend of John Brown. Stevens and the other men, intended to take the plantation owner prisoner and free his enslaved people. Anderson told the slaves that they had been freed and asked them join the fight to free other enslaved people. Washington and his weapons were captured and held, along with other prisoners, in the engine house of the armory, that Brown used as a fort.

Enslaved people had difficulty processing that they were free and what that might mean; their lives were so controlled that it was hard to sort out their options. Some joined with Brown's forces. Residents were concerned to see White and Black men walk the streets of Harpers Ferry with weapons, even though it was initially peaceful. The first death was that of Howard Shephard, a free Black man who worked at the railroad station. He ignored the raider's call to stop and was shot and killed.

The Jefferson Guards and Virginia troops closed off the bridges into Harpers Ferry and attacked Brown's raiders, cutting off a means of retreat. Anderson had been relaying messages between Brown and the engine house and Kagi at the rifle factory. Kagi asked to withdraw and Brown replied that he wanted more time. Anderson was mortally wounded by the thrust of a bayonet at the rifle factory. He died on October 16, 1859. His body was given to the Winchester Medical College for scientific purposes. The location of his grave is unknown. Ten of Brown's men and an unknown number of enslaved people were killed during the raid.

== Memorial ==
On November 23, 1859 (after Anderson was killed at Harper's Ferry, but before John Brown's execution), Anderson's brother, John Q., wrote a letter to Brown at Charles Town, Virginia (now in West Virginia). John asked for information about Anderson's death and stated the he had been two years a target in Kansas for the Border Ruffians and all, for what? Why because he purchased a claim & wished to settle on it & live by the sweat of his own brow. And now has died trying to enforce the golden rule.

== Historical markers ==
- Chestnut Grove Road, north of Harpers Ferry Road, Dargan, Maryland, mentions the participants in the raid, including Anderson
- Three markers near Kennedy Farmhouse,
- One near the farmhouse
- Another named Kennedy Farm, about 500 feet away from the first marker
- A marker named for John Brown, about 600 feet away.

== Sources ==
- Graham, Lorenz B. (1980). John Brown, A Cry for Freedom. New York: Thomas Y. Crowell. ISBN 978-0-690-04023-4.
