= Fort Montgomery =

Fort Montgomery may refer to:

- Fort Montgomery (Hudson River), American Revolutionary War fort near West Point, New York
- Fort Montgomery, New York, hamlet named after the Hudson River fort
- Fort Montgomery (Alabama), War of 1812 fort in Baldwin County, Alabama
- Fort Montgomery (Lake Champlain), 1844 fort in Clinton County, New York
- Fort Montgomery (Eureka), 1861 fort in Greenwood County, Kansas
- Fort Montgomery (Linn County), 1855 fortified home in Kansas
