= Wakarusa =

Wakarusa can refer to several things in the U.S. state of Kansas:

- The Wakarusa River, a stream in Kansas
- Wakarusa Formation, a geologic formation
- Fort Wakarusa, a former fort in Kansas
- Wakarusa, Kansas, a CDP
- Wakarusa Township, Douglas County, Kansas
- The Wakarusa War, part of the Bleeding Kansas violence before the American Civil War
- Wakarusa Music and Camping Festival

Wakarusa also can refer to:

- Wakarusa, Indiana, a town
