= Fort Henning =

Civil War blockhouse in Kansas, US

Coordinates: 37.8400°N 94.7075°W

In spring and probably into summer 1864 Fort Henning was constructed. It, along with Fort Blair (Fort Scott) and Fort Insley, was built to help protect the city and post of Fort Scott. Fort Henning, located at the intersection of Second and National Streets, was almost in the center of town. Fort Henning was an octagonal structure and measured fourteen feet across. It was the smallest of the three blockhouse forts.

Fort Henning, as well as Forts Blair and Insley, was surrounded by log palisades covered on the outside by earthworks, which were surrounded by wide, deep ditches. The blockhouse itself was constructed of rough wood planks and had a shingle roof. It stood two stories tall and had ports on both floors to allow cannon or rifles to be shot at anyone who dared attack it or Fort Scott.

All three blockhouses helped guard Fort Scott when Confederates under Maj. Gen. Sterling Price passed through the area in October 1864 near the end of their failed raid into Arkansas, Missouri and Kansas (see Price's Missouri Raid). After the Civil War ended Forts Henning and Insley were torn down. Fort Scott itself closed in October 1865.
