= Fort Simple =

Coordinates: 39.0517°N 95.6733°W

Fort Simple was an American fort built in Topeka, Kansas, as a result of Maj. Gen. Sterling Price's Missouri Raid in the late summer and fall of 1864 (see Price's Raid). Topeka had become the permanent capital of the State of Kansas in 1861, but no fortifications had been built to protect the city from guerrilla bands, which roamed eastern Kansas. Even the raid and massacre in August 1863 in Lawrence, Kansas (see Lawrence Massacre), did not result in a fort being built to protect the capital, although plans had been made to build one by July 1864.

== History ==
On October 8, 1864, Gov. Thomas Carney called the state militia to defend Kansas against Price's Confederates. The 2nd Regiment, based in Shawnee County (where Topeka was located), was sent to western Missouri to meet Price's force. A group of 292 men were also organized into a home regiment to guard Topeka. The men possessed one cannon, probably a mountain howitzer (see Mountain gun).

The home regiment, led by Maj. Andrew Stark, built a stockade in the middle of the intersection of 6th and Kansas Avenues and two sets of trenches on the east side of town. The stockade, which until after the Civil War had no name, was in the Topeka business district. Someone after the War called the structure Fort Simple and the name stuck. Both 6th and Kansas Avenues were wide streets and Kansas Avenue was at the top of a ridge that ran from 5th to 11th Streets. Therefore, the view from the fort commanded the surrounding countryside. The temporary State Capitol was on Kansas Avenue just north of 5th Street.

Simple was a circular stockade. The walls consisted of cottonwood logs sixteen feet long and split in half. The bark side faced the fort's outside. The logs were driven into the ground until only the top ten feet of them stood above ground. Fort Simple was forty to fifty feet in diameter. A flagpole in the center of the fort was erected.

The mountain howitzer was kept inside the fort and a port was cut in the east, west, south and north sides to allow it to be moved and fired. Notches for rifles were located completely around the fort. George A. Root claimed two notches were cut between each erect log, so one man could fire standing while another could fire kneeling. A wooden gate on the fort's west side was the only entrance to Fort Simple. No part of this fort had a roof, so it was completely open to the weather.

The home battalion guarded Topeka while the rest of the 2nd Regiment was east engaging Price's men. On October 23, in the evening, news reached Topeka that the Union forces had been crushed in the Battle of Westport, waged in what is now part of Kansas City. The entire city was in a state of panic and 350 armed men manned the trenches and Fort Simple through the night, expected an attack. In the morning a lone horseman raced into Topeka with the news that Price, not the Union forces, had been defeated.

The fort was used to defend Topeka until almost the end of the Civil War. In April and July 1865 the Topeka city council took actions to make the fort appear more attractive, since it was no longer used. In April 1867 it was decided Fort Simple had become an unsightly relic and it was torn down. In 1929 a bronze tablet was laid on the southwest corner of the intersection to honor Fort Simple's memory. In 1995 this tablet was removed during construction and not replaced.
