= Fort Insley =

Civil War blockhouse in Kansas, US

Coordinates: 37.846°N 94.705°W

In spring and summer 1864 Fort Blair, Fort Henning and Fort Insley were constructed to help protect the town and post of Fort Scott from Confederate forces. Fort Insley was named for Capt. Martain H. Insley. It was located just northeast of town, about 1½ blocks northeast of the main part of the post of Fort Scott. It overlooked Buck Run Creek.

Each blockhouse was built of sawed wood slabs or thick boards, which were covered with rough boards. Each had a wood shingle roof and had ports for aiming rifles and small cannon. Each was two stories tall. Each blockhouse was surrounded by log palisades covered on the outside by earthworks, which in turn were surrounded by wide, deep ditches.

Fort Insley was the largest of the blockhouses, measuring 20 ft (6.1 m) X 30 ft (9.1 m). It was garrisoned by a detachment from the 6th Kansas and served as an ammunition storehouse. The three blockhouses helped protect Fort Scott in October 1864 when Maj. Gen. Sterling Price retreated south during his failed invasion of Missouri (see Price's Missouri Raid). He hoped to overrun Fort Scott, but retreated without a fight.

After the American Civil War Forts Henning and Insley were torn down. Fort Scott itself closed in October 1865.
