= Fort Bain =

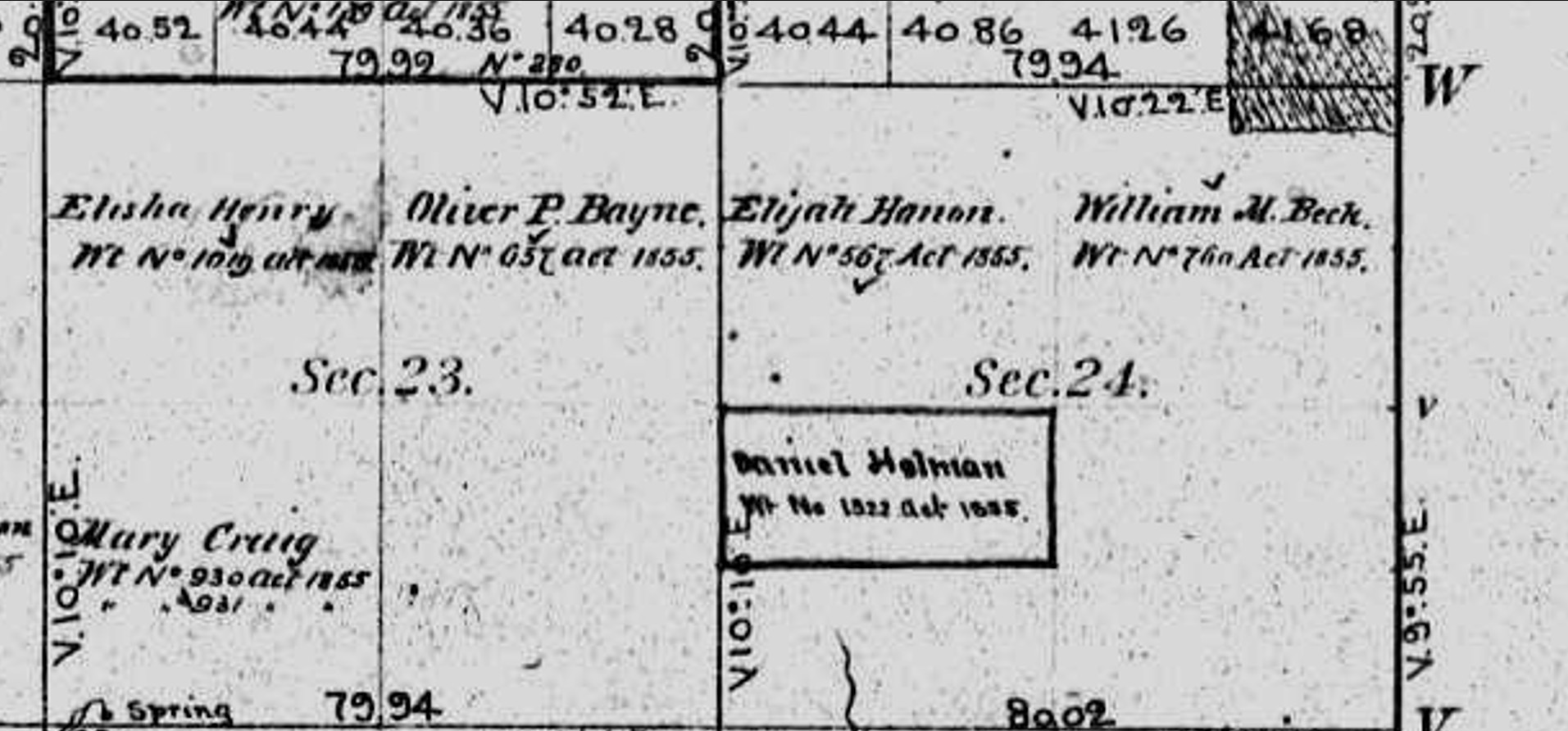
Bourbon County Plot belonging to Oliver Perry Bain (Bayne) in 1859. The land bordered Elijah Hanon a "free stater" from Illinois. This is most likely the area Fort Bain was built upon.

Fort Bain (also called "Fort Bourbon") was a log house in the Kansas Territory built in 1857 by John Brown and his associate Captain Oliver P. Bain (or Baynes). The house was located in northern Bourbon County, on the north side of the Osage River 1.5 miles due east of Fort Lincoln, approximately seven miles from the border with Missouri, near the present town of Fulton. The location might have been on his land plot in Bourbon County (see inset) besides the Kansas "Free Stater", Elijah A. Hanon from Illinois.

The house was used as a rendezvous point for both John Brown and James Montgomery throughout 1857-58 during the Bleeding Kansas troubles, and was also a point on the Underground Railroad. Although no contemporary illustrations or photographs of the house have been located, it was described by Brown as being substantial and capable of housing 50 men.

On December 16, 1857, a small number of men who identified themselves as a "Squatter's Court" defended the house against an armed posse of about 50 men led by United States Deputy Marshal Little from Fort Scott. Upon the arrival of Little's force, a parley ensued, but ended without resolution. Little advanced on the house and four of his men were wounded. Retreating and regrouping, Little and ten men attempted a second attack on Fort Bain, which was also unsuccessful but without any casualties. Little and his men then returned to Fort Scott. Little returned on December 17 with 150 men and found that Fort Bain had been abandoned by the Free Staters.

From Fort Bain, Brown planned his invasion of Missouri in December 1858.

The house was razed several years after the Bleeding Kansas struggles and replaced with another structure. Nothing marks the site today.

== See also ==
- List of Kansas Forts
- Bleeding Kansas
