= Fort Lincoln (Kansas) =

Historic fort in Kansas, USA

Fort Lincoln was established about 24 August 1861, by United States Senator James Lane. Earlier in August, Lane had reestablished Fort Scott as a military post. Soon Confederate troops under Maj. Gen. Sterling Price threatened to overrun the newly reopened post.

Lane moved 1200 troops, most of the citizens of the town of Fort Scott, and some refugees from Missouri to a point 15 miles northwest of Fort Scott. On some low ground on the north side of the Little Osage River, Fort Lincoln was established. The post was named for President Abraham Lincoln. Lane was criticized for choosing such a low spot, because it was difficult to see enemy troops coming and the area was prone to flooding during periods of heavy rains.

The post consisted of a number of buildings surrounded by a 5-foot-high (1.5 m) earthwork embankment. One large blockhouse was relocated to the town of Fort Scott about 1864 to help protect it and the post of Fort Scott. The town of Fort Lincoln was also established by Lane outside the post in 1861.

Once the threat to Fort Scott disappeared in September 1861, Lane took most of his troops from Fort Lincoln, leaving about 300 infantry and cavalry troops. In 1862, Lane's force was disbanded and the post was occupied by black Union soldiers, who guarded the post as a prisoner of war camp. Many Confederates were incarcerated there. In April 1863 the black troops were replaced by white troops. Between May and August 1863 the military abandoned the use of Fort Lincoln.

After its abandonment, George Walrod moved his family inside the fort. Walrod garrisoned the post as a one-man operation. Walrod died in October 1863 and in the winter a militia was formed in the area. The militia probably made use of Fort Lincoln until its destruction by retreating Confederates under Price on 25 October 1864. It was never rebuilt and the town of Fort Lincoln eventually disappeared.

== See also ==
- List of Kansas Forts
- Kansas in the Civil War
