= Fort Montgomery (Linn County) =

Fort Montgomery was a fortress home constructed of logs by James Montgomery in 1855 five miles west of Mound City, Kansas, in Linn County.

Montgomery was a free-state leader in Kansas Territory. This was after southerners burned his previous cabin. Montgomery's new home, dubbed Fort Montgomery, had many features that enabled the occupants to use the building for their defense, including rifle ports. The fort was located on the side of a hill and the occupants had a clear view of everything to the south for miles.

Especially prior to the outbreak of the Civil War, Montgomery and his family used the defense of his fort home. Several times southerners and border ruffians attempted to shoot persons inside or set the fort on fire. During the Civil War, Montgomery, an officer in the U.S. Army, was away much of the time on military duty. Through the war, however, the fort was intermittently used for refuge against guerrillas active in the area. Eventually, Montgomery abandoned his fort and it was demolished in 1915.

== See also ==
- Fort Montgomery (Eureka), 1861 fort also named after James Montgomery.
