= Fort Blair (Fort Scott) =

Civil War blockhouse in Kansas, US

Coordinates: 37°50′35″N 94°42′13″W

In spring and possibly through summer 1864, three blockhouses were constructed to help defend the town and post of Fort Scott. These were Fort Blair, Fort Henning and Fort Insley. Fort Blair was enclosed by a rectangular wall of log palisades covered on the outside by earthworks, which in turn were surrounded by a wide, deep ditch. These were to be used by armed men and cannon in case the town and post were attacked by Confederate guerrillas or regular forces. A drawing of Fort Blair and its stockade showed the stockade as about waist high.

Fort Blair was named for Gen. Charles W. Blair. This fort contained two 24-pounder guns. The blockhouse was built of sawed or thick boards, which was covered with rough boards. It had openings for rifles and small cannon and was roofed with wood shingles. Three of the gun ports were on the second floor and a fourth was on the first floor. The structure was two stories tall.

Fort Blair was the second largest of the three blockhouses, measuring sixteen by sixteen feet. It was in south Fort Scott, located between Main Street and Scott Avenue. The fort was several blocks south of the main part of the post of Fort Scott.

Fort Blair was used to guard Fort Scott when Confederate Maj. Gen. Sterling Price passed through the area in late October 1864 near the end of his failed raid into Arkansas, Missouri and Kansas (see Price's Missouri Raid). Price wanted to overrun the defenders at Fort Scott, but not one shot was fired when Price passed within sight of the post.

Fort Scott was closed as military post in October 1865. The Fort Blair blockhouse was the only of the three not to be torn down. It was disassembled and moved at least twice. Finally it was reconstructed and placed adjacent to the Fort Scott National Historic Site, where it remains today.
