= Fort Montgomery (Eureka) =

Coordinates: 37.8193°N 96.2953°W

Fort Montgomery in the town of Eureka, Kansas was built in summer 1861 by local citizens for protection against Indian attacks and Confederate guerrilla forces.

An earlier structure also named Fort Montgomery had been built in Linn County, Kansas, west of Mound City. Both were named after free-state leader James Montgomery.

The Eureka fort was fairly solid, apparently being constructed of logs. Ports for guns were built into the walls and these could be covered. Surrounding the fort were breastworks of logs covered with dirt. A small cannon, issued by the federal government, was mounted outside the fort. The roof, however, leaked and the floor, while made of wooden planks, allowed animals and snakes inside.

Fort Montgomery was manned by government scouts and the local militia. Militia commander Leander Bemis was in charge of the fort. The militia was outfitted with guns supplied by the Federal government. For a time Fort Montgomery served as the local school, after the schoolhouse burned.

The militia manned the fort until 1868, the year which regular troops occupied the building for a short time. After they left, the fort became the first newspaper office of The Eureka Herald, starting on July 4, 1868. The editor, S. G. Mead, had to remodel the fort, which by then showed many signs of wear. He made other attempts to fix problems, but gave up what he saw as a hopeless battle. In May 1869 Fort Montgomery was demolished.

== See also ==
- Fort Montgomery (Linn County)
