= Fort Wakarusa =

Former fort in Kansas, U.S.

Coordinates: 38°55′38″N 95°08′15″W

- Douglas County, Kansas

Site information
- Type: free-stater post during Bleeding Kansas era
- Controlled by: free-staters

Site history
- Built: between 1855 and 1857
- In use: 1850s
- Materials: wood, soil

Garrison information
- Garrison: free-state residents

Little is known about Fort Wakarusa, which was built by free-state partisans between 1855 and 1857. Historian William E. Connelley drew a map in the 1920s that located the fort on the north side of the Wakarusa River, at Blue Jacket's Crossing. The town of Sebastian, Kansas, was on the south side of the river. Considering that the area is very flat and that there are some meander scars showing that the river has changed course various times, the site of Fort Wakarusa may today be on the south side of the river. The fort was located about midway between Lawrence, Kansas, and Eudora, Kansas.

Little is known about the fort's layout. It probably consisted of earthworks and logs. One source said rifle pits were dug outside the fort. No source claims knowledge of this fort's fate and nothing of it remains.
