= Fort Scott National Historic Site =

National Historic Site of the United States

- U.S. National Register of Historic Places
- U.S. National Historic Landmark District
- U.S. National Historic Site
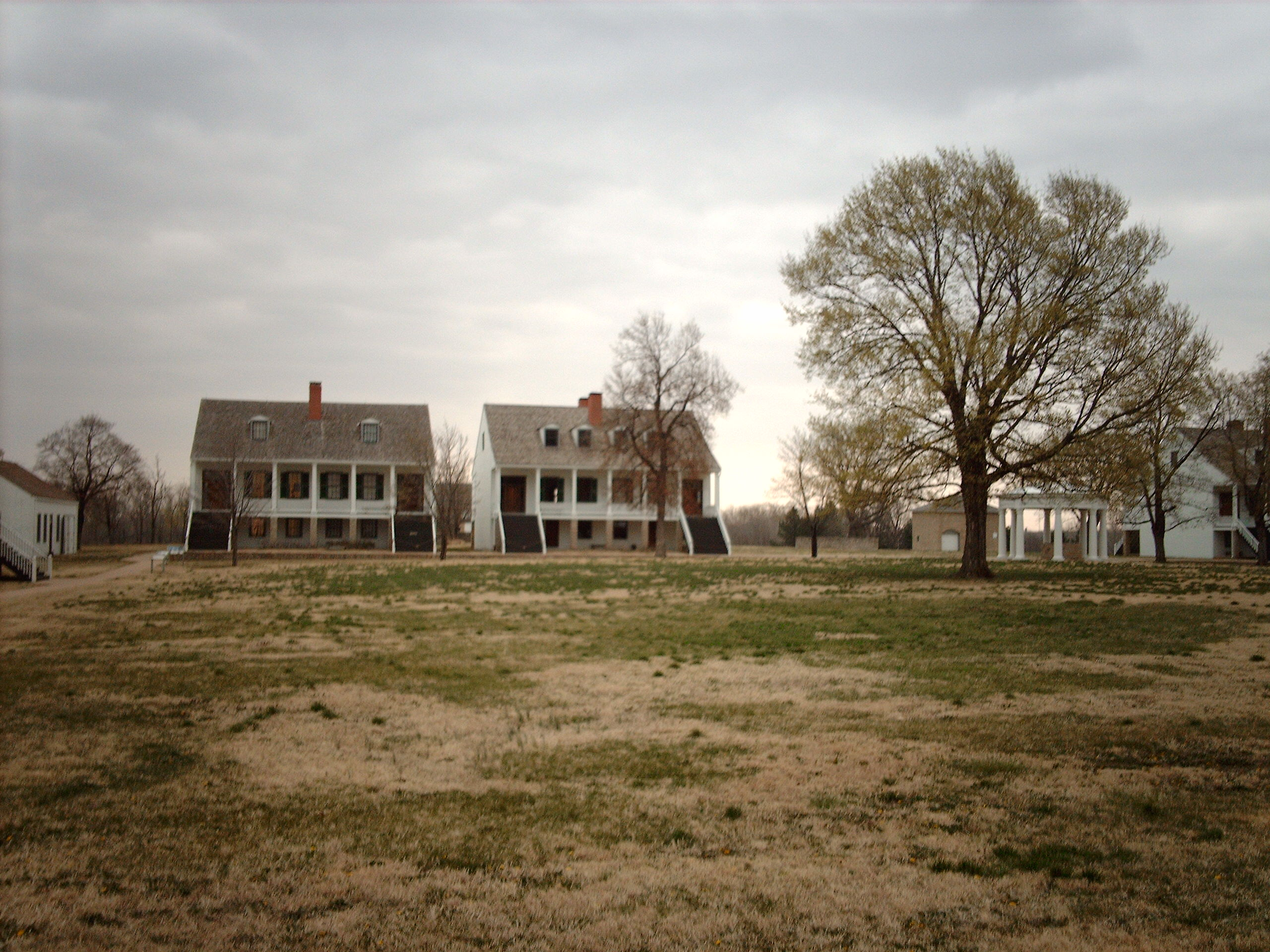

- Location within Kansas Location within the United States
- Location: Old Fort Blvd., Fort Scott, Kansas
- Nearest city: Fort Scott, Kansas
- Coordinates: 37°50′38″N 94°42′17″W
- Area: 17 acres (6.9 ha)
- Built: 1842
- Architect: United States Army
- Visitation: 24,654 (2024)
- Website: Fort Scott National Historic Site
- NRHP reference No.: 66000106

Significant dates
- Added to NRHP: October 15, 1966
- Designated NHLD: July 19, 1964
- Designated NHS: October 19, 1978

Fort Scott National Historic Site is a historical area under the control of the United States National Park Service in Bourbon County, Kansas, United States. Named after General Winfield Scott, who achieved renown during the Mexican–American War, during the middle of the 19th century the fort served as a military base for US Army action in what was the edge of settlement in 1850. For the next quarter century, it was used as a supply base and to provide security in turbulent areas during the opening of the West to settlement, a period which included Bleeding Kansas and the American Civil War.

The current national historic site protects 20 historic structures, a parade ground, and five acres (20,000 m^{2}) of restored tallgrass prairie, inside the city of Fort Scott. It is open to visitors most days of the year.

== History ==
In 1842, Fort Scott was named after Winfield Scott, was established on the American frontier on the military road in eastern Kansas between Fort Leavenworth and Fort Gibson. It was established to provide protection to the rapidly increasing number of settlers, who were migrating from the Eastern United States. Fort Scott became one of a chain of forts intended to protect the new settlers from the Plains Indians, as well as to protect the Indians from the settlers' encroachment.

The United States government intention to reserve permanent Indian lands west of the Missouri River gave way to the competition of settlers continuing to encroach on the Indian settlements. Fort Scott's most active days were between 1842 and 1853, although it was also used during the Civil War.

=== Army days ===
The Cherokee of Indian Territory (now Oklahoma) were upset to have Fort Wayne in their proximity. After some delay, the US Army decided to abandon Fort Wayne and move its soldiers to a new fort to be built between Fort Leavenworth and the site. The Army both wanted to placate the Cherokee (who were supervised by the Department of Defense) and provide more defense for white settlers and other Indians against the Osage, who had been conducting frequent raids in the area. On April 1, 1842, some soldiers of Fort Wayne left their fort and on April 22 arrived where Fort Scott would be built, in the Osage Cuestas section of modern-day Kansas. After haggling with the Cherokees to acquire the land, the rest of Fort Wayne's garrison left the fort on May 26 and arrived at the Fort Scott site on May 30.

Unlike most forts for military use, the fort did not have defensive walls or structures when first built; the wide-open area and the available artillery made an enclosed fort unnecessary. The soldiers concentrated on building structures for lodging the men, animals, and equipment. These buildings were on the edges of a 350-foot (110 m) parade ground.

The post quartermaster, Captain Thomas Swords, was in charge of building Fort Scott's structures, and had to deal with the problems of construction on the Kansas prairie, which had few trees. He had only two bricklayers and three carpenters to rely on, as there were few civilians and most of the soldiers had other duties to perform. Wood was available, but the mill was built 1.5 miles (2.4 km) away, making transport time-consuming. Swords found his efforts plagued by lack of wood, skilled labor and working equipment. Freak accidents destroyed much of the wood intended for the fort's construction. As a result, only one duplex of the five planned officers quarters (four duplexes and post commandant's house) was built by 1844, and the intended enlisted barracks were not completed. In his 1844 inspection of the fort, Colonel George Croghan reported that, in comparison to other frontier forts, he considered Fort Scott "above average".

Due to the rising tensions that escalated in the Mexican–American War, the US Army redeployed troops to the Southwest. With Fort Scott still uncompleted, officials decided on April 25, 1850, that no more construction would be done there, after eight years and $35,000. By the time it was finished, it was obsolete; three years later, it was abandoned by the military in favor of the more western Fort Riley.

For the average soldier, life at the fort was "monotonous". Until the permanent structures were built, soldiers had to live in tents, which lacked comfort. Aside from a few whiskey peddlers and prostitutes, few civilians lived at the fort. Officers had brought their personal slaves with them, including Captain Swords. The border with Missouri was 5.15 miles (8.29 km) east of Fort Scott. In Missouri was a grog shop that supplied soldiers, and quite a few courts-martial followed soldiers' going AWOL at the shop. The desertion rate from the fort ranged from 12 to 16%, due to boredom, irregular pay, and hatred for military life. As no combat took place near the fort, it seemed more of a frontier village than a military base. Hunting was a popular pastime; according to Captain Swords, "wolf chasing and duck hunting" was the only way one officer could tolerate the place.

=== Bleeding Kansas ===
Two years after the army abandoned the fort, the buildings were sold by auction to civilians, with two being converted to hotels. In 1854 the Kansas–Nebraska Act repealed the Missouri Compromise of 1820, which had kept slavery out of Kansas. Missourians in favor of slavery soon moved to Kansas to try to sway the vote of whether or not Kansas would permit slavery. Settlers from New England arrived equally determined to keep it out. Each of the two competing factions of the Bleeding Kansas conflict claimed one of the hotels at Fort Scott: Free-Soil at the Fort Scott Hotel and Pro-Slavery at the Western Hotel. Most of the residents in Fort Scott supported slavery, but those outside the town tended to the free-soil side. During this time, there were local incidents of murder and attempted arson, typical elements of the guerrilla conflicts that were prevalent in the fighting.

=== Army returns ===
During the American Civil War, the fort was renewed as a US military post. In August 1861, the Union Army took command of Fort Scott, and readied it for the war times. The United States Army also took over several blocks within the town for commissary and quartermaster functions. The Union Army rented the properties from the current civilian owners. Troops from Indiana, Iowa, Colorado, Ohio, and Wisconsin would come to the fort, and either stayed by the fort, or traveled farther, to subjugate Missouri, Arkansas, or the Indian Territory. Fort Scott was one of the few installations that recruited and trained black soldiers for the United States Colored Troops of the Union Army.

A major supply depot was situated at the fort. Confederate general Sterling Price hoped to capture the town, but the closest the Confederate force came to the garrison was 10 miles (16 km) away at Battle of Dry Wood Creek. The site was strategically important as it was within a Southern-sympathizing area and close to the Confederate state of Arkansas and the "unstable" Indian Territory (present-day state of Oklahoma), where many of the members of the Five Civilized Tribes were allied with the Confederates. The fort served as a "general hospital" (large military hospital) and prison until after the war. Following the end of the war, in October 1865 the US Army left the facilities and sold off by auction what they controlled.

On January 14, 1870, the Army returned with the formation of the Post of Southeast Kansas. The Post was based at Fort Scott, but the soldiers camped along the rail tracks, and seldom used the original fort. They were sent to protect the railroads and workers from settlers. Some of the latter feared that the railroad, which had been awarded land for development by the US Government in rights-of-way, would evict them from their squatter homes. The settlers considered the troops lackeys to the railroads, and lumped both as enemies.

Settlers also had some continuing conflicts with Indians and insurgents using the recent Confederate cause as excuse for robbery. By the spring of 1873, the US Army withdrew the troops from Fort Scott for good. From 1873 to 1965, the buildings of the fort were left unattended, and slowly deteriorated. Many military buildings were razed and replaced with structures built for civilian use.

== Modern times ==
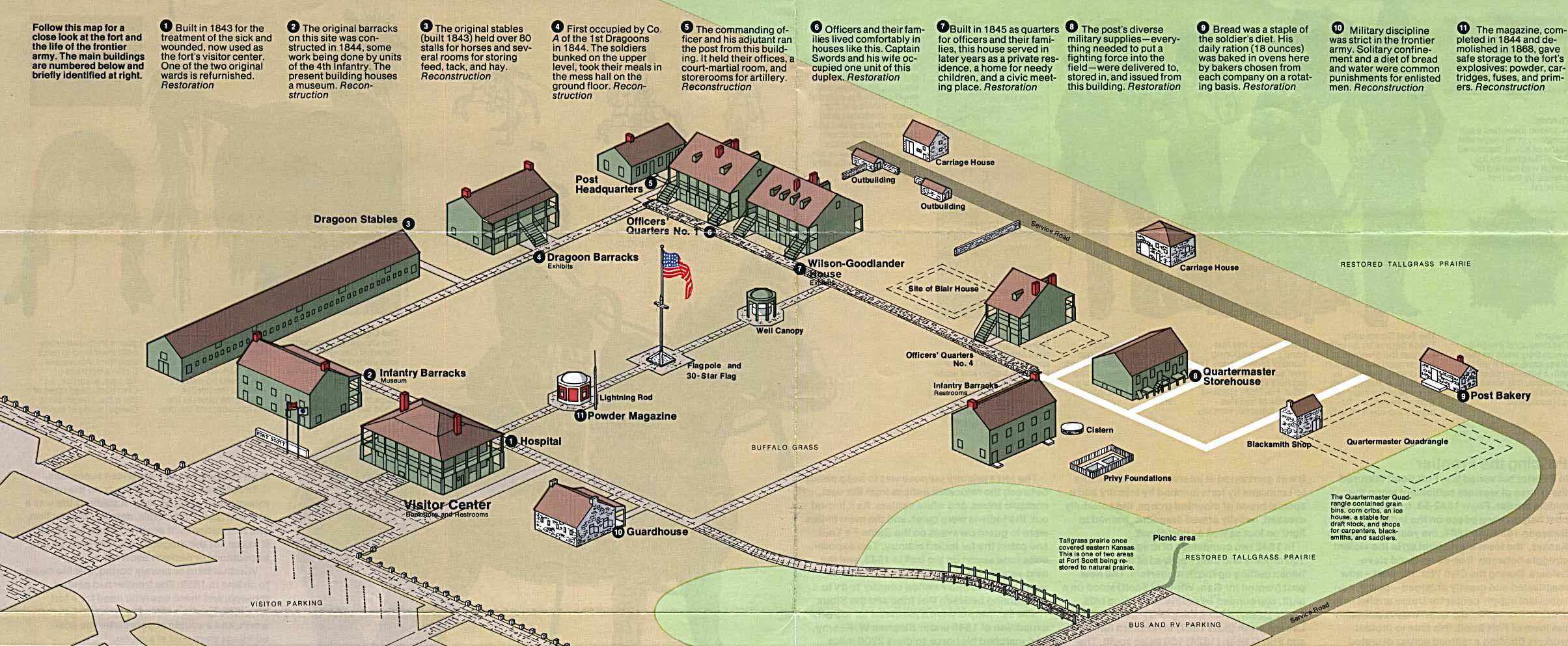
Park Service schematic of Fort Scott National Historic Site

With the Act of August 31, 1965, the National Park Service gave the city government of Fort Scott, Kansas the necessary funds and technical knowledge to restore the fort.

On October 19, 1978, Fort Scott became a National Historic Site under the supervision of the National Park Service, encompassing 17 acres (6.9 ha). Today the fort is open throughout the year, save for Thanksgiving, Christmas, and New Year's Day. Visitation has declined in recent years. In 2005 visitation was 25,528; in 2007 it was 22,314.

Surviving structures include four officers' barracks, one dragoon's barracks, two infantry barracks, a hospital, guardhouse, dragoon stables, ordnance and post headquarters, quartermaster stables, bake shop, flagpole, and magazine. Another feature of the park is 5 acres (2.0 ha) of tallgrass prairie restored as part of an ecology-restoration project.

== See also ==
- Fort Blair (Fort Scott)
- Fort Larned National Historic Site
- List of National Historic Landmarks in Kansas
