= Thomas Gardner (planter) =

Early English colonist in New England

- Born: c. 1592
- Died: 1674 (aged c. 82); Salem, Massachusetts Bay Colony
- Resting place: Harmony Grove Cemetery
- Occupations: Overseer (Cape Ann settlement), Salem: Deputy to General Court, Land owner, Constable, Selectman/Juryman
- Spouse: Margaret Fryer
- Children: Thomas, George, Richard, John, Sarah, Samuel, Joseph, Miriam, Seeth

Thomas Gardner (Note: Alternately spelled "Gardiner, Gardener") (c. 1592 – 1674) was an Overseer of the "old planters" party of the Dorchester Company who landed in 1624 at Cape Ann to form a colony at what is now known as Gloucester. Gardner is considered by some to have been the first Governor of Massachusetts, due to his being in authority in the first settlement that became the Massachusetts Bay Colony (into which was later subsumed the Plymouth Colony).

== Cape Ann ==
The area known as Cape Ann had been visited by the Plymouth group, who had obtained a Patent and had fished in the area known as Gloucester. These visitors from the south had built structures for salting and temporary housing. The Gardner-led group, who settled the area via another Patent, maintained themselves after their landing. Disagreements occurred between the Plymouth colonists and the "West Country" colonists over Patent conflicts. Roger Conant, a Plymouth colonist, was instrumental in working out a compromise between the parties, part of which was moving the Dorchester group away. The colony that had been planned for Cape Ann was doing well, having brought over adequate provisions and having had the proper skills, yet it was commercially unsuccessful because of the rocky, infertile soil and poor fishing in the area. In 1626, the Dorchester Company granted permission for Conant, who had arrived in 1625 from Plymouth via Nantasket, to assess the situation, to become the new Overseer, and to move the colony.

The first Great House in New England was built on Cape Ann by the planters. This house was dismantled on the orders of John Endecott in 1628 and was moved to Salem to serve as his Governor's house. When Higginson arrived in Salem, he wrote that "we found a faire house newly built for the Governor", which was remarkable for being two stories high.

== Salem ==
Some of the Old Planters moved with Conant to the mouth of the Naumkeag River, now the North River. They first landed near the foot of present-day Skerry Street. Other members of the group returned to England or went south to Virginia. For a few years, the area was multicultural; the settlers had a peaceful relationship with Native Americans, who had been regular visitors to the area for generations. In the early years, the thatched cottages of the planters huddled along the bank of the river.

The new colony at Naumkeag proved to be successful and was named Salem in 1629. According to Conant, the settlement laid the foundation for the Commonwealth. Those following Gardner and Conant as leader were John Endicott and John Winthrop, respectively, as new planters. Thomas and Roger continued to be considered old planters, who got little recognition from the religious leaders, such as Francis Higginson. Gardner and his sons played several roles in the early development of the settlement. They did much of the early survey work in the area. Thomas also served on the court and oversaw highway work.

== Biographical information ==
Thomas Gardner's signature

Thomas Gardner's origins are not clearly known. He may have been born in 1592 to Thomas and Elizabeth Gardner. His mother may have been the sister of Minister John White, who help found and fund the Dorchester Company that became the colony of Massachusetts Bay. According to Goff, Gardner may have been chosen through family ties to head the 1623 Cape Ann Colony, which was a "fishing station and saltworks" whose goal was to ship seafood to England.

Gardner had two wives; Margaret (c. 1589 – 1659) and Demaris UNK (c. 1597 – 28 November 1674), widow of UNK Shattuck. He had six sons with Margaret; Thomas, George, John, Samuel, Joseph, and Richard, and three daughters; Sarah, Seeth, and Miriam. In 1623, Gardner landed at Cape Ann with Margaret and the three sons, who had been born in England. A fourth son was born in 1624. He and the widow Shattuck had no children together. Gardner died on 29 December 1674 and is buried in Salem, Essex, Massachusetts.

=== Degrees of separation ===
Through his second wife Damaris, Thomas' influence could be expanded through the shrinking world argument. Damaris was the widow of (unknown first name) Shattuck. Their son Samuel was an active Quaker. Thomas' stepchildren's descendants include, for example, Nathaniel Gorham (1738–1796), John Marshall Harlan (1833–1911), Thomas Stearns Eliot (1888–1965), and Sandra Day O'Connor (1930–2023).

== Burial ==
Thomas was buried on Gardner Hill aka Gardner Burying Ground near present-day Boston Street and Grove in Salem. His daughter Seeth and his grandson Abel are also buried there. Abel's wife, Sarah Porter Gardner, whose mother was the sister of John Hathorne, was buried with her husband. The gravestones of Thomas and many others were moved from the old burial ground to a remote area of the Harmony Grove Cemetery in the 1840s. A 1692 map of the area shows that the Gardner Burying Ground was in close proximity to Harmony Grove which was incorporated in the 1840s.

== Notes ==
Footnotes

Citations
