= Old Planters (Massachusetts) =

Classification of European settlers

The Old Planters of Massachusetts were settlers of lands on Massachusetts Bay that were not part of the two major settlements in the area, the Plymouth Colony (1620), and the Massachusetts Bay Colony (begun 1628, expanded significantly starting in 1630).

== Early English settlement attempts in North America ==
In 1607 a Plymouth Company expedition led by George Popham and partially financed by Sir Ferdinando Gorges founded Popham Colony in Maine, which lasted one year before being abandoned. During that year the colonists built a seaworthy boat, the Virginia pinnace.

In Massachusetts, the 'old planters' proved through their hard work that settlement was possible; subsequent to this, there was a major influx of 'new planters' that continued over a decade. The early expansions centered around Plymouth and what is now Essex County, Massachusetts but eventually spawned the westward movements.

== Plymouth ==
Two early areas of settlement were Plymouth (c 1620) and Nantasket (c 1621). The Plymouth Colony began with the Mayflower's landing and is a well-known story. The Nantasket settlement followed soon after that of Plymouth. Roger Conant was at these two settlements before going north to Cape Ann.

== Essex ==
The Essex colony started at Cape Ann in 1623 with a party led by Thomas Gardner and John Tylly. For this party, there were two ships with 32 people who were to settle the area commercially. About a year later, this party was joined by a group from Plymouth led by Roger Conant. These efforts were funded by the Dorchester Company, which withdrew its funding after 1625. In 1626, some of the original party, as many left to return to England or to go south, moved the settlement, in hopes of finding more success, to Naumkeag. This settlement worked out and became Salem.

According to the Essex Institute, the list of old planters, in 1626, who were in Cape Ann before the move were as follows:

Roger Conant - Governor, John Lyford - Minister (went to Virginia, instead of Naumkeag), John Woodbury, Humphrey Woodbury, John Balch, Peter Palfray, Walter Knight, William Allen, Thomas Gray, John Tylly, Thomas Gardner, Richard Norman (and his son), William Jeffrey, and Capt. William Trask.

Some of these, with Conant, have been referenced as the 'old planters' of Salem: Woodbury, Trask, Balch, Palfrey.

With Gardner, and then Conant, in the lead, this early group was known for independence and tolerance which traits some (to wit, Puritan minister John White) may have seen as being, perhaps, unfit; there had been reports detailing issues, such as insubordination, as far back as Merrymount and the Cape Ann effort. Some of the old planters, however, managed to thrive in the less tolerant religious atmosphere of the Massachusetts Bay Colony.

The subsequent changes in leadership, with first John Endecott and then John Winthrop, brought in some military discipline and also religious focus. After that, new planters came in successive waves.

John Endecott brought with him, in 1628, the patent that replaced the Dorchester Company with the Massachusetts Bay Colony. A little later, Rev Francis Higginson brought more settlers and set up the first parsonage. Rev Higginson also established the notion that the settlement was of religion and not trade, seemingly contradictory to the interests of London.

By 1630, Puritan interests had organized a massive influx led by John Winthrop, who decided the Cape Ann area was not suitable for the number of arriving colonists, and founded Boston to the south instead. Even though center of government was in Boston, by 1700, the population of the Cape Ann area, which was organized into Essex County in the 1640s, had also grown rapidly. The population of New England went from less than 500 to over 26,000 in the years from 1629 to 1640.

=== Plymouth involvement ===
The Plymouth colony had made excursions along the Massachusetts coast including north to Cape Ann. Some records report that Cushman and Winslow of Plymouth had received a patent for Cape Ann (1623/24). Other reports suggest that salting structures had been built in the Cape Ann area to support fishing efforts.

The Gardner group, who were to settle the area, did succeed in maintaining themselves after their landing, though the commercial goals of the Dorchester Company were not met. There were also disagreement between the Plymouth colonists and the Dorchester Company settlers, due to patent conflicts. Roger Conant, having first been at Plymouth, was probably instrumental in working out a compromise, part of which resulted in the Dorchester group moving to the Naumkeag area.

== Establishment of the Bay Colony ==
John Winthrop's influence, with his arrival with a caravan in 1630, was a major change for the Massachusetts Bay area, in that he came in with 700 people and ships full of supplies.

In June 1630, the Winthrop Fleet arrived in what would later be called Salem, which on account of lack of food, "pleased them not." They proceeded to Charlestown, which pleased them less, for lack of fresh water. Finally, they were shown the Shawmut Peninsula, where they established Boston.

Some of the Old Planters may have followed Winthrop from Salem; Conant and Gardner stayed in the Salem area. So too did some people who arrived with Winthrop, such as Major William Hathorne, father to John Hathorne and ancestor of Salem native Nathaniel Hawthorne.

Winthrop's establishment of the Massachusetts Bay Colony drastically altered the institutions of the few souls who had pioneered the area earlier. A proper government was organized. Within four years, Harvard College was born.

== Notes ==
Footnotes

Citations
