= John Higginson (minister) =

English-born clergyman (1616–1708)

- Born: 16 August 1616; Claybrooke, Leicestershire, England
- Died: 9 December 1708 (aged 92); Salem, Province of Massachusetts Bay, British America
- Occupations: Minister; clergyman

Coat of Arms of John Higginson

John Higginson (6 August 1616 – 9 December 1708) was a clergyman. He came to America with his father, Francis Higginson. After his father's death, he assisted in the support of his mother, Anne Herbert Higginson, and brothers by teaching in Hartford. With Giles Firmin he was employed by the magistrates and ministers of the Massachusetts Bay Colony to take down in shorthand the proceedings of the synod of 1637. He was chaplain of the fort at Saybrook Colony for about four years. In 1641, he went to Guilford, Connecticut as assistant to Henry Whitfeld or Whitfield (1597-1687), whose daughter Sarah (1620-1775) he married. In 1643, he was one of the "seven pillars" of the church there.

He sailed for England with his family in 1659, but the vessel put into Salem harbor on account of the weather, and he accepted an invitation to preach there for a year, finally settling as regular pastor of the church that his father had planted. He was ordained in August 1660, and continued there till his death. He was an active opponent of the Quakers, but subsequently regretted his zeal, and took no part in the witchcraft prosecutions of 1692. He was one of the most popular divines in New England, and at his death had been seventy-two years in the ministry. He published various sermons, the most well-known of which is his "Election Sermon" of 1663, "The Cause of God and His People in New-England," He was the author of the "Attestation" to Cotton Mather's Magnalia, which was prefixed to the first book of that work.
