= Great House (Cape Ann) =

Coordinates: 42.5217°N 70.8946°W

Great House in Cape Ann was a seventeenth-century structure built by colonists in present-day Gloucester, Massachusetts. It was later disassembled and moved to Salem, Massachusetts, to be the Governor's house.

== Origins ==
When Thomas Gardner with his party of "old planters" came to Cape Ann to establish a fishing colony, they arrived with the necessary provisions to become self-sustaining and to ship seafood product back to England. The area turned out to not allow easy success at the endeavor, but a little-known accomplishment of the small group was to build a house that was the first of its kind in New England. One author wrote that it was quaintly described by an early writer as "of the model in England first called Tudor, and afterwards the Elizabethan, which was essentially Gothic." It was of two stories with a sharp pitch-roof. (Note: Image depicts house in mid 1700s, after extension renovation)

Governor's house, Cape Ann, after move to Salem and 1792 alterations

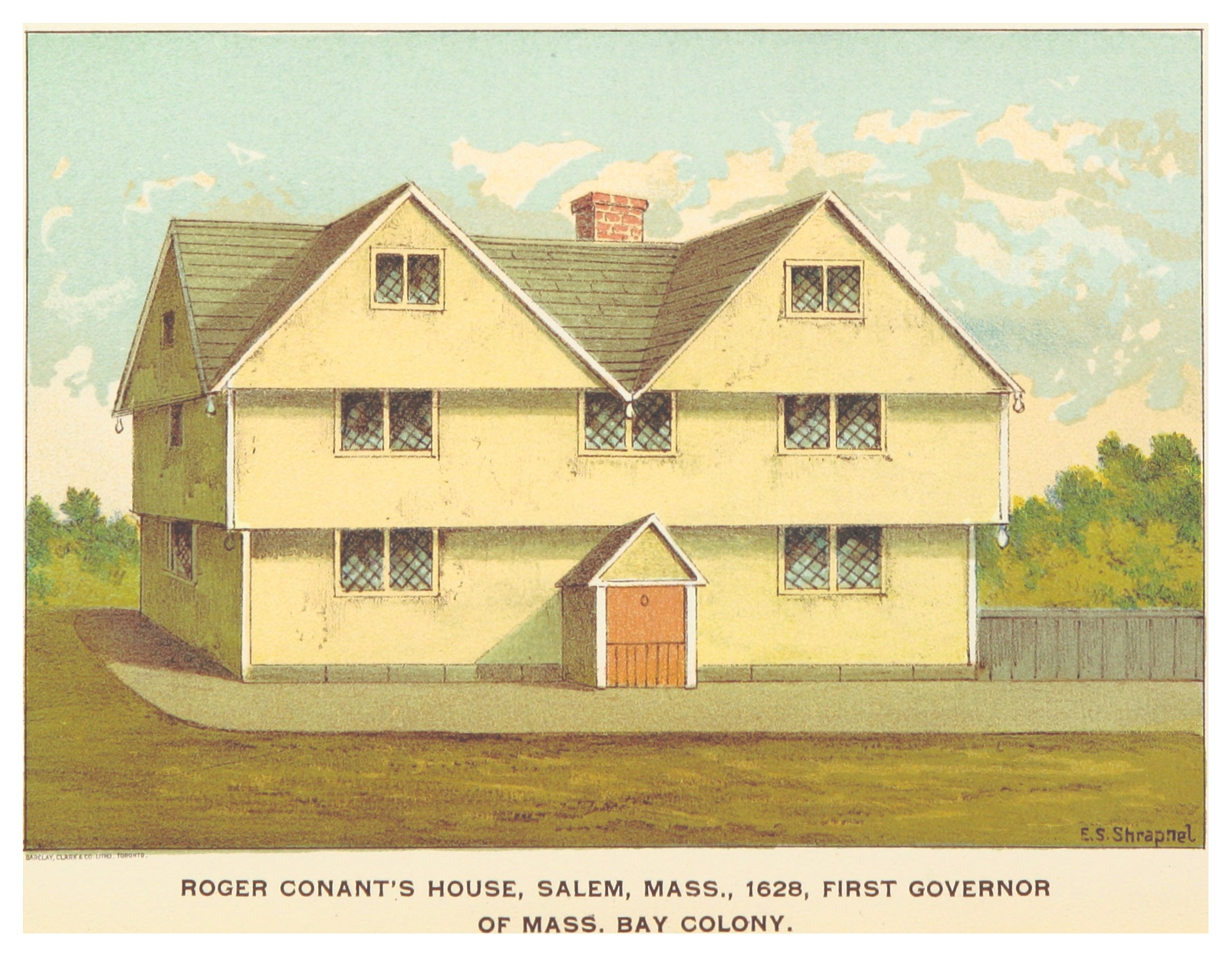
Another view of the governor's house after 1792 alterations

Information about its origin is scanty, but much of the material came with the party. Some material, such as lumber pieces, may have been produced locally. One later observer mentioned that the framing looked to be designed for transportation. When Roger Conant arrived at Cape Ann in 1625, the house was already there. Roger's son, Lot, is thought to have been born in the house.

== Moving ==
In 1628, John Endecott ordered for the house, which was to become known as the Governor's House, to be disassembled, moved from Cape Ann, and reassembled on what is now Washington Street, north of Church Street. When Reverend Francis Higginson arrived in Salem, he wrote that "we found a faire house newly built for the Governor," which was remarkable for being two stories high.

== Uses ==
It was in this house that Governor John Winthrop and his party, on their arrival in 1630, partook of their first meal in the New World by dining on venison and beer. Also, according to Winthrop's diary, the party enjoyed fresh strawberries brought from plantings done at Cape Ann.

The house went through several transitions; a third story was added in 1792. Tradition has it that some pieces of the old house may have been used for some extant structures.

== Pioneer Village replica ==
There has been a lot written about the house. Unfortunately, sketches were done after the later modifications. George Francis Dow did a detailed study of the house and included a replica in the Pioneer Village built up for the 300th anniversary of Salem's founding.

== Notes ==
Footnotes

Citations
