= Nantasket Beach =

Beach in Massachusetts

Nantasket Beach Reservation
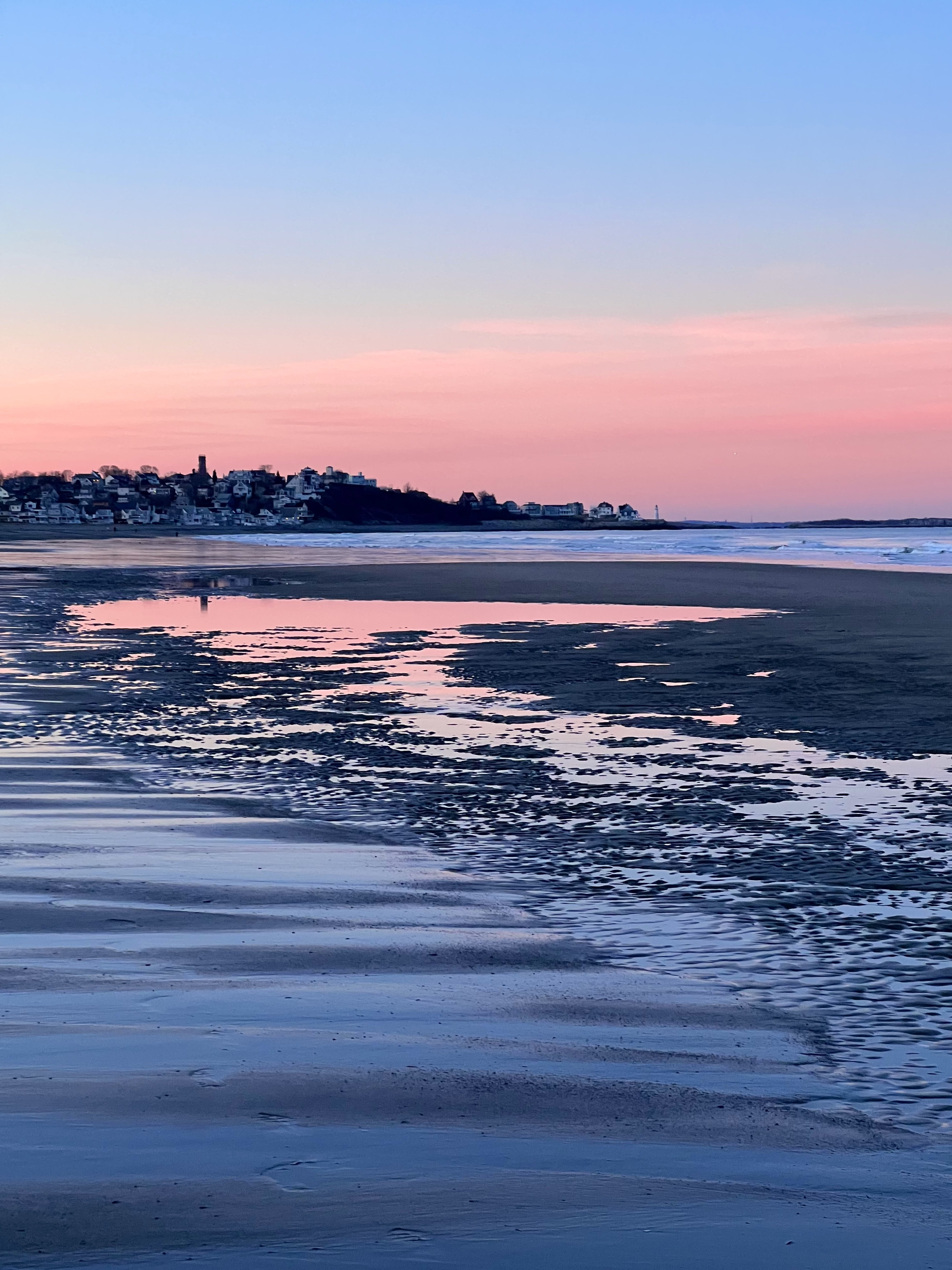
- Nantasket Beach in 2023

- Location within Massachusetts Location within the United States
- Location: Hull, Massachusetts, United States
- Coordinates: 42°17′30″N 70°52′28″W
- Area: 39 acres (16 ha)
- Elevation: 0 ft (0 m)
- Administrator: Massachusetts Department of Conservation and Recreation
- Website: Official website

Nantasket Beach is a beach in the town of Hull, Massachusetts. It is part of the Nantasket Beach Reservation, administered by the state Department of Conservation and Recreation. The shore has fine, light gray sand and is one of the most highly rated beaches in Greater Boston. Due to its gentle slope, at low tide, the beach extends several hundred yards in width, forming tide pools that have become a well known, picturesque characteristic of the site, renowned for their reflections of the sunsets and sunrises. The northern part of the beach is private, administered by the Town of Hull, and does not allow visitors to park except as guests of residents. The beach is a habitat for federally protected species, including the piping plover, least tern, and occasionally harbor seals.

== Name ==
The name "Nantasket" is derived from Wampanoag and means "low-tide place" or "where tides meet", referring to the fact that the site was originally a tidal island connected to the mainland by a sandbar that would emerge only at low tide. Nantasket was settled not long after Plymouth Colony and before Massachusetts Bay. Roger Conant was in the area after leaving the Plymouth Colony and before going to Cape Ann in 1625. Until Hull was incorporated in 1644, English settlers referred to the whole local region as "Nantasket Peninsula".

== History ==
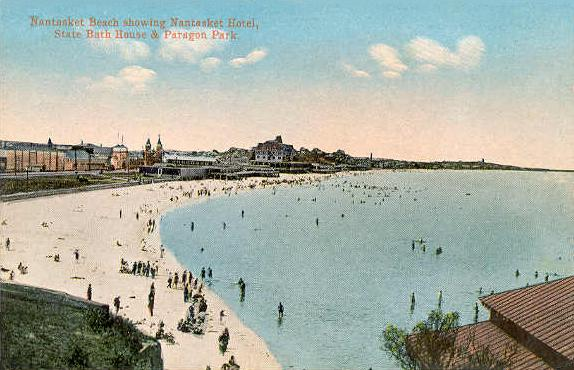
Nantasket Beach circa 1910

Nantasket has been the summer refuge of many eminent Americans, such as U.S. President John F. Kennedy, his brother Joseph P. Kennedy Jr., ambassador Joseph P. Kennedy Sr. and his wife Rose Kennedy. Others include U.S. President Calvin Coolidge, former mayor of Boston John F. Fitzgerald, Irish-American poet John Boyle O'Reilly, who had a house on the peninsula, and Ralph Waldo Emerson, who spent time at Nantasket in July 1841, reflecting on "the beauty of the good" and "the book of flesh and blood". The peninsula was forested until at least 1624, when the first European settlers are known to have begun agriculture on what was then a tidal island, with a land bridge connecting what is today Nantasket Beach to the mainland. Plymouth colonists kept a structure in the area to serve as storehouse for trading with the Massachusett tribe, implying that Indigenous people used the site routinely. Settlements grew in subsequent years, supporting a fishing community as well as limited farming. In 1825, Paul Warrick established "The Sportsman Hotel" on Nantasket Avenue. Later, more hotels were built and steamboats made three trips a day between Nantasket Beach and Boston in the 1840s. By 1888, the Old Colony Railroad linked Boston to Hull in the nation's first electrical railroad. In 1905, an amusement area called Paragon Park was built adjacent to the beach. A carousel built by the Philadelphia Toboggan Company (PTC #85) in 1928 was included. This was closed in 1984.

Nantasket Road is the sea lane area of sea north of the peninsula, a key navigational channel through which sailing ships accessed Boston harbour and where Rear Admiral Molyneaux Shuldham moored HMS Chatham after British forces withdrew from Boston on March 19, 1776.
