= John Lyford =

English colonist and minister

The Reverend John Lyford (c. 1580 – 1634) was a controversial figure during the early years of the Plymouth Colony. After receiving degrees from Oxford University (A.B. 1597, A.M. 1602), he became pastor at Leverlegkish, near Laughgaid, Armagh, Ireland. He was the first ordained minister to come to the Plymouth Colony. He arrived in 1624 aboard the Charity and pretended to be sympathetic to the Separatist movement there, while in reality he was allied with the Church of England. In the months ahead, the leaders of the colony discovered that Lyford had been writing letters to England disparaging the Separatist movement at Plymouth. Governor William Bradford seized some of these letters before they were sent, opened them, and confronted Lyford about their contents. Lyford apologized, but later wrote another similar letter that was also intercepted. After the second incident, Lyford was sentenced to banishment.

Before he was banished, Lyford's wife, Sarah, came forward with further charges. Lyford had fathered a child out of wedlock with another woman before his marriage, and after his marriage, he was constantly engaging in sexual relationships with his housemaids. In his famous history, Of Plymouth Plantation, Bradford wrote that Sarah Lyford came forward and explained

how he (Lyford) had wronged her, as first he had a bastard by another before they were married, and she having some inkling of some ill carriage that way, when he was a suitor to her, she tould him what she heard, and deneyd him; but she not certainly knowing the thing, other wise then by some darke and secrete muterings, he not only stifly denied it, but to satisfie her tooke a solemne oath ther was no shuch matter. Upon which she gave consente, and married with him; but afterwards it was found true, and the bastard brought home to them. She then charged him with his oath, but he prayed pardon, and said he should els not have had her. And yet afterwards she could keep no maids but he would be medling with them, and some time she hath taken him in the maner, as they lay at their beds feete, with shuch other circumstances as I am ashamed to relate.

Later, the real reason why Lyford came to New England was revealed. While giving pre-marital counseling to a girl in his parish back in Ireland, Lyford raped her; and when she later told the matter to her husband, he and his friends hunted Lyford down, which resulted in Lyford's departure to Plymouth Colony. Bradford's account of the rape and what followed is rather vivid:

some time after marriage the woman was much troubled in mind, and afflicted in conscience, and did nothing but weepe and mourne, and long it was before her husband could get of her what was the cause. But at length she discovered the thing, and prayed him to forgive her, for Lyford had overcome her, and defiled her body before marriage, after he had commended him unto her for a husband, and she resolved to have him, when he came to her in that private way. The circumstances I forbear, for they would offend chast ears to hear them related, (for though he satisfied his lust on her, yet he indeavored to hinder conception.) These things being thus discovered, the womans husband tooke some godly friends with him, to deale with Liford for this evill. At length he confest it, with a great deale of seeming sorrow and repentance, but was forst to leave Irland upon it, partly for shame, and partly for fear of further punishmente, for the godly withdrew them selves from him upon it; and so coming into England unhapily he was light upon and sente hither.

Accordingly, Lyford was expelled from Plymouth Colony, went to Nantasket, then Cape Ann, and finally moved to Virginia, where he died. Because of his immoral behavior, Lyford is grouped with several other men that the Pilgrims considered detrimental to their project of settling a "godly" community in America; among these were Thomas Granger, Thomas Morton, and John Billington.

Following Lyford's death on March 8, 1649, his widow Sarah remarried Edmund Hobart Sr., a prominent early settler of Hingham, Massachusetts.
