= Roger Conant (colonist) =

English colonist (1592–1679)

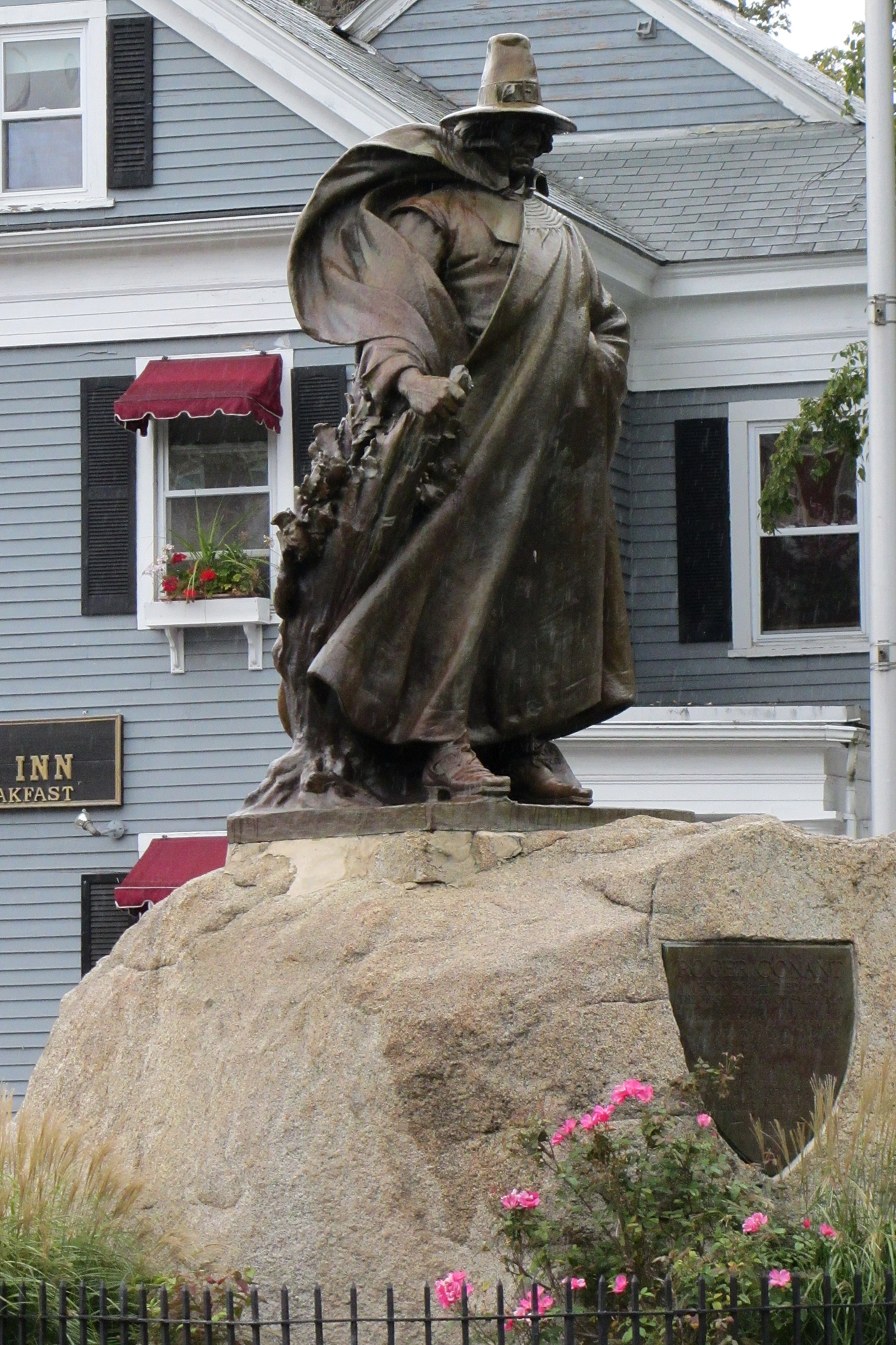
- Statue of Roger Conant by Henry Hudson Kitson in Salem, Massachusetts.
- Born: c. April 1592; East Budleigh, Devonshire, Kingdom of England
- Died: November 19, 1679 (aged 87); Beverly, Massachusetts Bay
- Occupations: Colonist, drysalter
- Known for: Founding Salem, Massachusetts

Roger Conant (c. 9 April 1592 – November 19, 1679) was a New England colonist and drysalter credited for establishing the colony of Salem, which evolved into the current communities of Salem, Peabody, Beverly and Danvers, Massachusetts.

Conant arrived at Plymouth Colony from London in 1624, where he became associated with Puritan opposition and subsequently led the settlement to outlying areas, including the site of an ancient Native American village and trading center, which would later become Salem.

Conant's leadership provided the stability to survive the first two years in Salem, but John Endecott, one of the new arrivals, replaced him by order of the Massachusetts Bay Company. Conant graciously stepped aside and was granted 200 acres (0.81 km2) of land in compensation.

Conant died in Beverly, Massachusetts Bay on November 19, 1679.

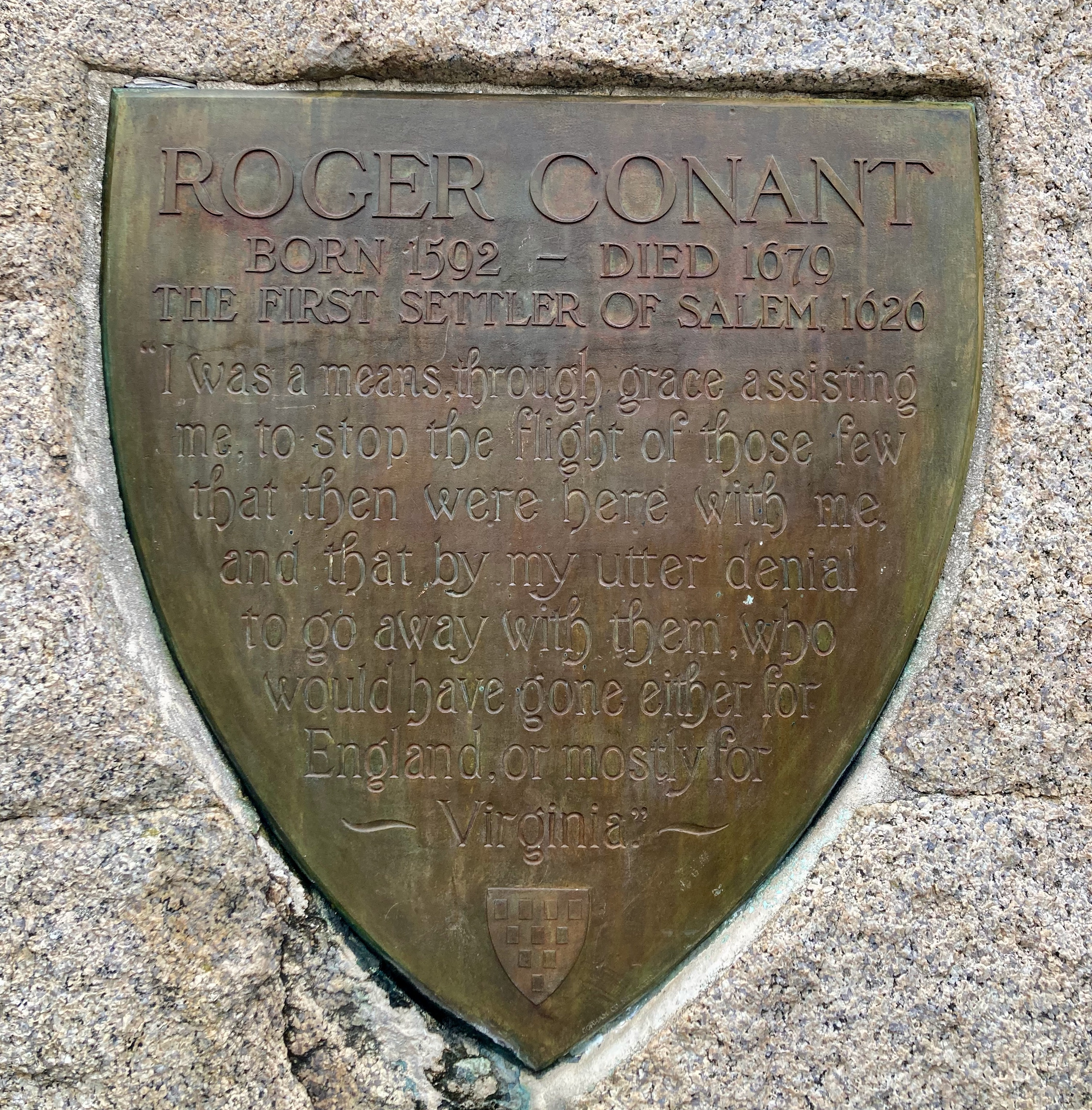
Plaque on the Roger Conant statue in Salem, Massachusetts.

== Early life ==
Roger Conant was baptized in East Budleigh, Devon on April 9, 1592. He was the son of Richard Conant and Agnes (née Clarke). He would later move to London, where he became a drysalter.

== Life in New England ==
Contrary to some accounts that Roger Conant and his family arrived in 1623 in the ship Anne, per Banks, only Roger's brother Christopher Conant is listed as being on the Anne in 1623. In William Bradford's history, in addition to letters to him by the London Adventurers, mention is made of an unnamed master or journeyman salter who may have arrived in Plymouth in the Charity in March 1623/24. It is thought that Bradford may have been describing Conant, and that he arrived in Plymouth in 1624.

In 1625, Bradford learned of the death of John Robinson, the long-time minister of their exiled congregation in Leiden, Netherlands. Robinson had been the driving force behind all their efforts to find a better place than England to live their lives and it was he who cared for the many left at the Leiden congregation after the Mayflower's departure. After the dispiriting news of Robinson's death, those in Plymouth began to lose the fervor that helped them survive the grim early years there and began to fear that all they had gained might eventually be destroyed. These dark thoughts turned into mean-spirited fanaticism. At about that time, John Lyford, a minister who had been sent over by the London Adventurers, was expelled from Plymouth for secretly meeting with settlers who wished to return to the type of worship that they had back in England. One of Lyford's supporters, John Oldham, was forced to run a gauntlet while Pilgrims beat him with the butt-ends of their muskets. This punishment received the approval of Pilgrim leader Edward Winslow. The Adventurers were quite displeased over what had happened to one of their men and criticized the Pilgrims as “contentious, cruel and hard hearted, among your neighbors…”. Bradford later in his writings wrote that he thought that Lyford and Oldham deserved their punishments. These actions against the rebellion of Lyford and Oldham were possibly the reason Roger Conant left Plymouth for other locations where he would later continue to be in association with them against the Plymouth authorities.

In the years prior to and also after John Robinson's death, Plymouth Colony had lost about a quarter of its residents. They had moved to other areas of New England or gone back to England, or to Virginia. Some, such as salter Roger Conant, found a place to work and worship peacefully in the fishing and trading outposts along the New England coast at Nantasket and Cape Ann. Per Hubbard's General History, about 1624 Conant moved to Nantasket with his family and about a year or so later relocated to Cape Ann, at the north end of Massachusetts Bay.

In another case of the new Pilgrim vindictiveness, in 1625 Roger Conant was involved in a violent situation between Plymouth Colony military Captain Myles Standish and some fishermen on Cape Ann. Conant was so shocked by the violence the Plymouth captain displayed that Conant later reported the incident in detail for Pilgrim historian William Hubbard. In restating John Robinson's earlier concerns about the way the colony was turning to fanaticism and violence, Hubbard wrote, "Captain Standish…never entered the school of our Savior Christ…or, if he was ever there, had forgot his first lessons, to offer violence to no man." Hubbard also wrote about Standish; "so was the Plymouth captain, a man of very little stature, yet of a very hot and angry temper."

In 1626 Conant was chosen as the first governor of the English settlers on Cape Ann (who soon moved from Gloucester to Salem) and was replaced in 1628/9 by Gov. John Endecott. This was the first permanent settlement in Massachusetts Bay Colony, and it was here that the first legal form of government was established in Massachusetts Bay Colony. Conant initially lived in a "great house" in what is now Stage Fort Park in Gloucester. Governor Endecott had the house moved to Salem in 1628. An old fort in Gloucester was renamed from Stage Fort to Fort Conant in his honor during the Civil War.

== Later years in Salem ==
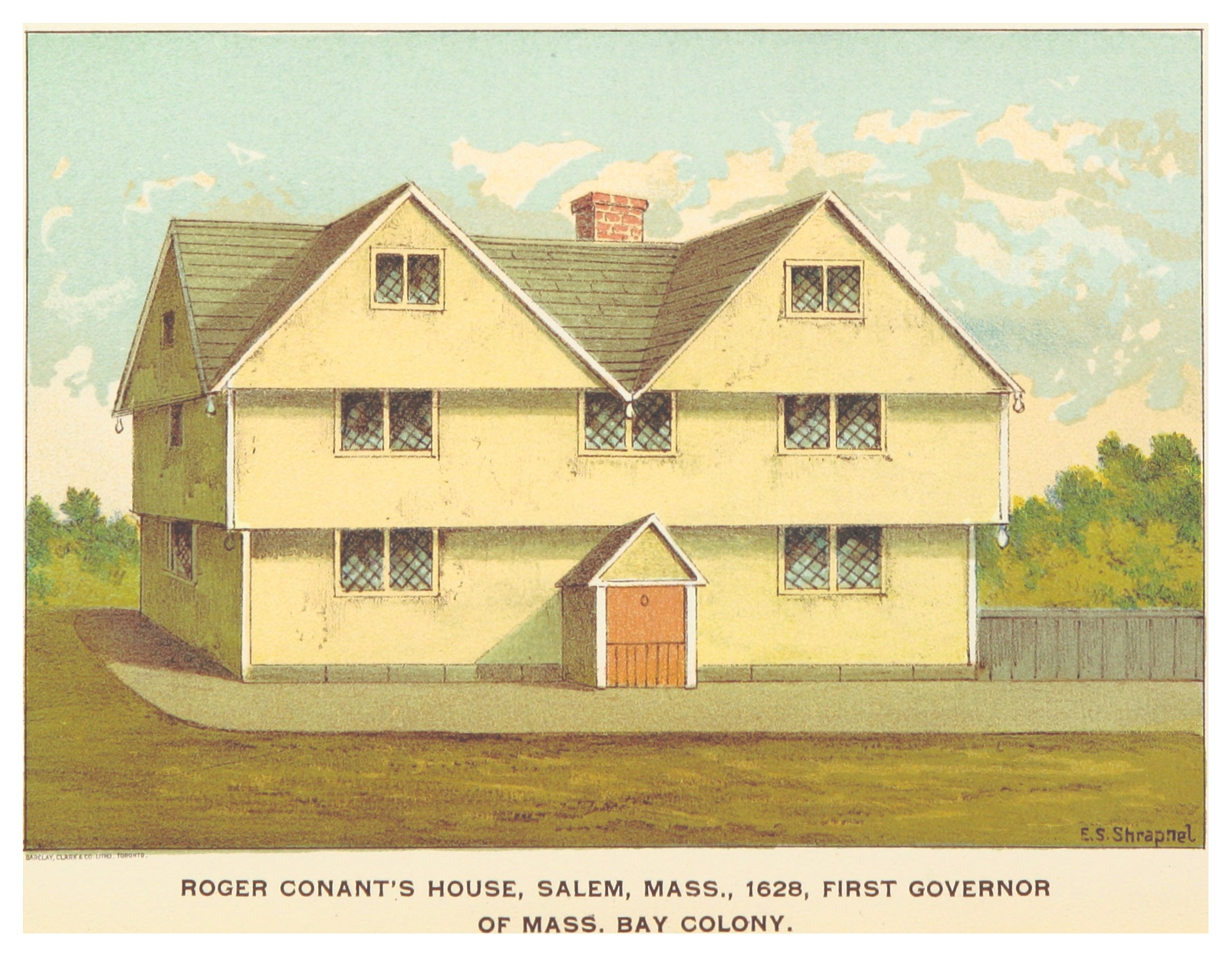
Conant's house after its relocation from Cape Ann (now Gloucester) to Salem

Conant built the first Salem house on what is now Essex Street, opposite the Town Market. In 1630 he was chosen as a freeman, or voting stockholder of the Massachusetts Bay Company. Conant was one of the first two Salem representatives to the colony's general court or legislature, and was repeatedly elected a selectman by the people of Salem. When the legislature granted communities the right to establish district courts, Roger Conant served on numerous Salem quarterly juries for sixteen years. He also was involved in civic activities over the years such as establishing town boundaries and laying out land grants.

Roger Conant was active in the affairs of Salem throughout his life. In 1639, his signature was one of the first ones on the contract for enlarging the meeting house in Town Square for the First Church in Salem. This document remains a part of the town records at City Hall.

During his very long lifetime Conant had a number of family tragedies, including the death of his wife Sarah, and of sons Caleb, Lot, Roger and Joshua. Only his son Exercise and possibly several daughters succeeded him.

== Family ==
Coat of Arms of Roger Conant

Roger Conant and Sarah Horton married at St. Ann Blackfriars, London on November 11, 1618, and had nine or ten children. She was alive in November 1660 and may have died before March 1677/78 as she was not named in her father's will. Her burial place is unknown.

Children of Roger and Sarah Conant:

- Sarah was baptized at St. Lawrence Jewry, London on September 19, 1619, and was buried there October 30, 1620.
- Caleb was baptized at St. Lawrence Jewry, London on May 27, 1622. He died in England before November 11, 1633, when his uncle, John Conant, became administrator of his estate.
- Lot was born about 1624 and died September 29, 1674. He married Elizabeth Walton and had ten children. The marriage of their descendant Hannah Conant (d.1810) with Josiah Dodge (d.1785/90) in 1761 connected the line of Mayflower passenger Richard More with the Conant family. The marriage of their descendant John Conant (1814-1903) with Elvira Bradford (1820-1897) in 1842 connected the Conant line to the line of eight Mayflower passengers: William Bradford, William Mullins, Priscilla Mullins, John Alden, William Brewster, Mary Brewster, Love Brewster, and Richard Warren. After Lot's death, Elizabeth married Andrew Mansfield in Lynn on January 10, 1681/82.
- Joanna was born about 1625. https://findingpromise.wordpress.com/2020/12/14/roger-and-sarah-horton-conant/
- Roger was born in Salem and died in June 1672. He married Elizabeth Weston by 1661 and had two children.
- Sarah was born about 1628. She married John Leach and had ten children.
- Joshua was born about 1630 and died in England in 1659. He married Seeth Gardner by 1657 and had one son.
- Mary was born about 1632.

She married:
1. John Balch about 1652 and had one daughter.
2. William Dodge by 1663 and had five children.

- Elizabeth was born about 1635 and was unmarried in March 1677/78. Nothing further is known.
- Exercise was baptized in Salem on December 24, 1637, and died on April 28, 1722. He married Sarah Andrews by 1668 and had six children. He was buried in Olde Mansfield Center Cemetery, Mansfield, CT.

== Death and burial ==
Roger Conant died on November 19, 1679, in what is now the city of Beverly in Essex County, Massachusetts. He was reportedly buried in Burying Point Cemetery in Salem.

== Statue in Salem ==
In 1913, the Conant Family Association approved sculptor Henry Hudson Kitson's design for a bronze sculpture of Roger Conant. Kitson's dramatic design features Conant overlooking Salem Common, shrouded in a billowing heavy cloak. The sculpture was installed atop a boulder taken from nearby Lynn, Massachusetts. Because of the cloak, wide-brimmed hat, and its location directly outside the Salem Witch Museum, visitors to the area often mistake Conant for a witch.

In 2005, the Salem Common Neighborhood Association successfully raised funds to restore the statue by cleaning the bronze of the stains it had accumulated from acid rain and pollution. The $30,000 restoration was completed by Rika Smith McNally.

A plaque affixed to the front of the statue reads:

"I was a means through grace assisting me to stop the flight of those few that then were here with me, and that by my utter denial to go away with them, who would have gone either for England, or mostly for Virginia."

== Genealogies ==
One of the earliest known genealogies of Roger Conant and his descendants is the volume written by his descendant E. W. Leavitt and privately printed in 1890: "A Genealogy of One Branch of the Conant Family, 1581-1890." An earlier Conant genealogy, published in Portland, Maine, in 1887 and written by Frederick Odell Conant also delved into the English origins of the Conant family.
