= Cape Ann =

- Region of Massachusetts
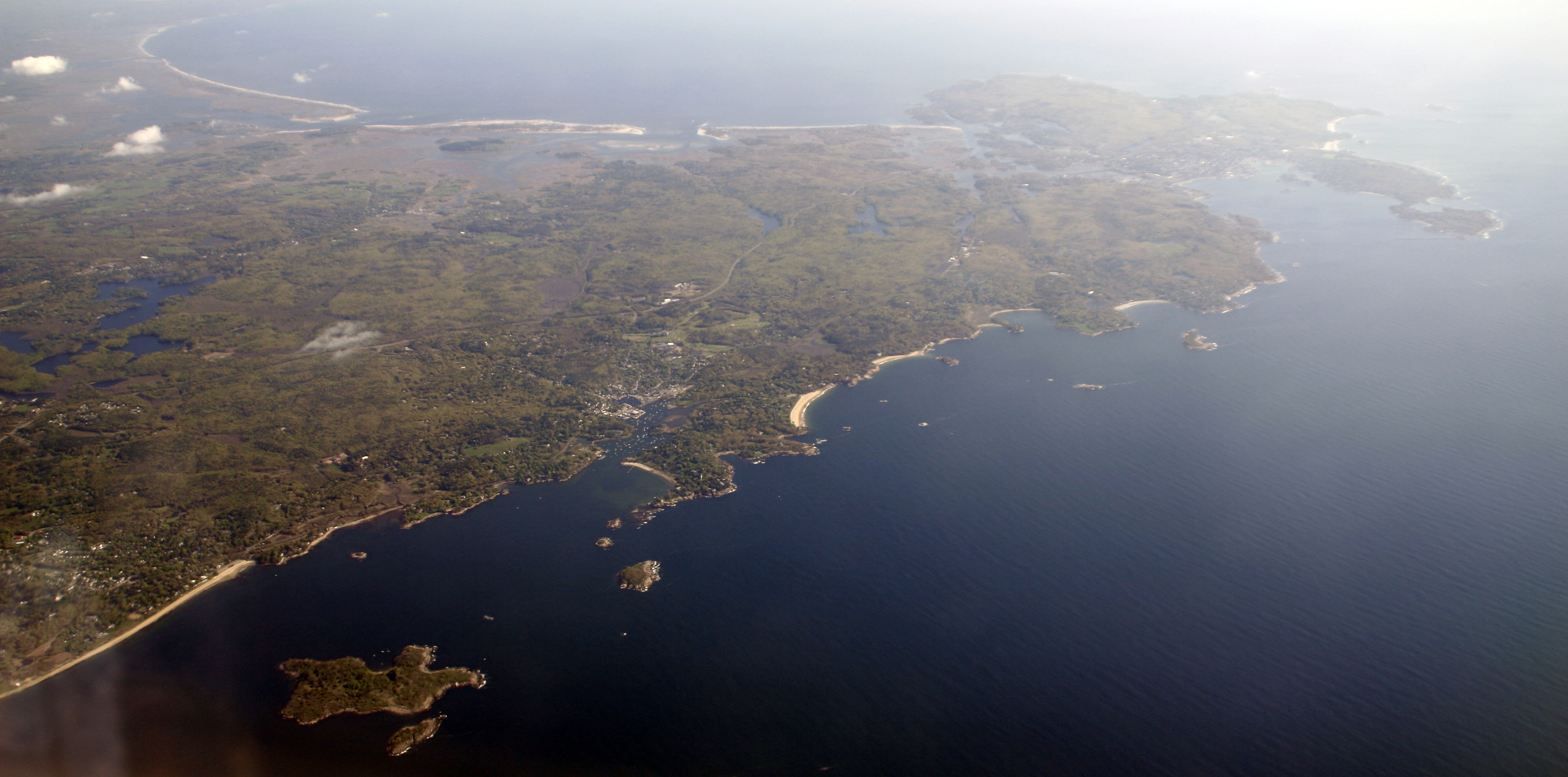
- May 2008 aerial view of Cape Ann in Massachusetts. Gloucester and its harbor are visible to the upper right, and Manchester-by-the-Sea is at center, just west of Singing Beach.
- Etymology: Anne of Denmark
- Location within Massachusetts
- Coordinates: 42.6488°N 70.5926°W
- Country: United States
- State: Massachusetts

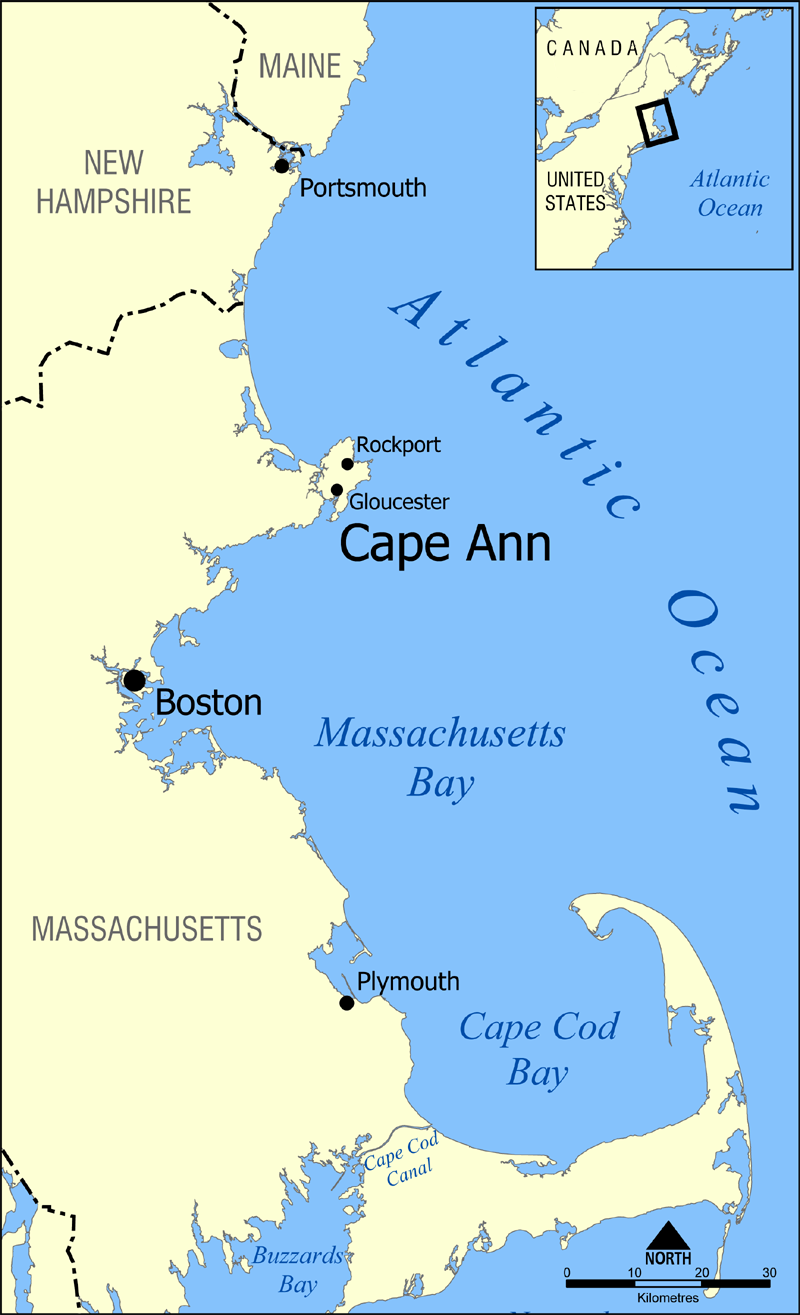
Eastern Massachusetts, with Cape Ann

Cape Ann is a rocky peninsula in northeastern Massachusetts on the Atlantic Ocean. It is about 30 miles (48 km) northeast of Boston and marks the northern limit of Massachusetts Bay. Cape Ann includes the city of Gloucester and the towns of Essex, Manchester-by-the-Sea and Rockport.

== Etymology ==
During the summer of 1606, French explorer Samuel de Champlain visited Cape Ann for the second time. He came ashore in Gloucester and drew a map of the Gloucester harbor, naming it as le Beau port. Eight years later, English Captain John Smith named the area around Gloucester Cape Tragabigzanda, after a woman whom he met while in Turkey as a prisoner of war. He had been taken prisoner and enslaved in the Ottoman Empire before escaping.

Smith presented his map to Charles I and suggested that Charles should feel free to change any of the "barbarous names" into English ones. The king made many such changes, but only four survive today. One was Cape Ann, which Charles named in honor of his mother Anne of Denmark.

== History ==
Prior to the arrival of European settlers, Cape Ann was a home for indigenous people. The English colony at Cape Ann was first founded in 1623. It was the fourth colonizing effort in New England after Popham Colony, Plymouth Colony and Nantasket Beach. Two ships of the Dorchester Company brought 32 in number with John Tylly and Thomas Gardner as overseers of a fishing operation and the plantation, respectively. At the Cape Ann settlement a legal form of government was established, and from that Massachusetts Bay Colony sprang. Roger Conant was the governor under the Cape Ann patent, and as such, has been called the first governor of Massachusetts.

This colony predated Massachusetts Bay charter and colony. For that reason, members of the colony were referred to as "old planters". The first Great House in New England was built on Cape Ann by the planters. This house was dismantled on the orders of John Endecott in 1628 and moved to Salem to serve as his "governor's" house. When Higginson arrived in Salem, he wrote that "we found a faire house newly built for the Governor" which was remarkable for being two stories high.

By 1634 the name of Cape Ann was already established, as it is mentioned and depicted on maps in William Wood's New England's Prospect first published in that year.

On November 18, 1755, Cape Ann was the land nearest the offshore epicenter of an earthquake, which is extremely rare for Massachusetts. There were no seismographs at that time; but, based on available data, the tremor was estimated at magnitude 6.5. It caused serious damage in the Boston area, but no casualties.

By the mid-1800s, Cape Ann was known for its specialization in granite production, specifically in creating paving blocks for roads and streets and were used across the United States from New York to San Francisco.

Cape Ann became a thriving center of activity for artists in the 19th century, including the Rocky Neck Art Colony in Gloucester. Fitz Henry Lane who began his career in Gloucester as a lithographer developed a distinctive style for his marine paintings known as luminism. The Cape Ann Museum has a significant collection of paintings by local artists who reached national prominence. Later in the 19th and early 20th century, American Impressionists were attracted to Rockport such as marine landscapist Harry Aiken Vincent who arrived in 1916 and helped to form the Rockport Art Association. The region continues to provide a base for many galleries and working artists.

== Communities ==
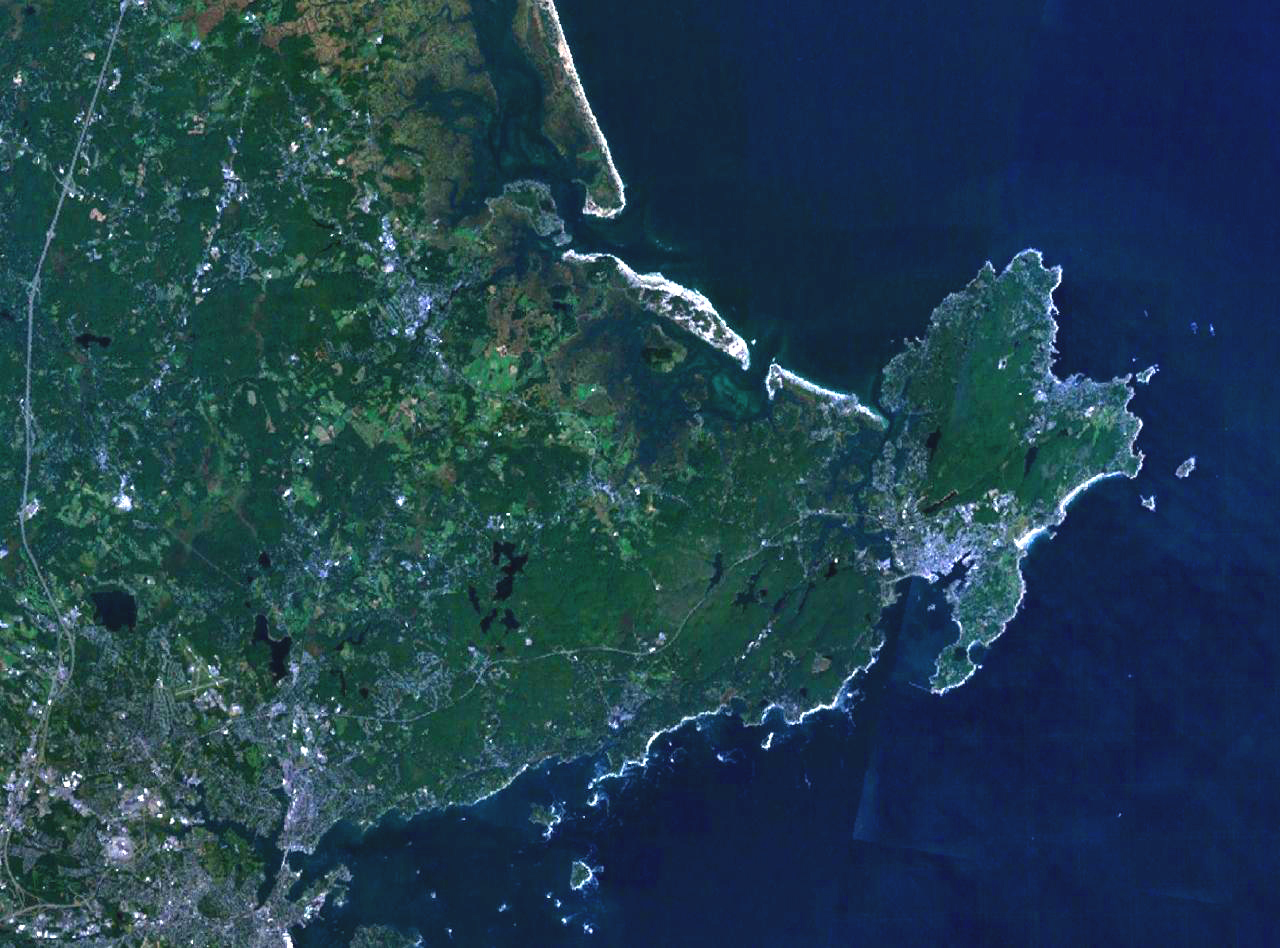
Landsat satellite photo of Cape Ann. The communities of Rockport, Gloucester, Essex and Manchester form Cape Ann

The entirety of Cape Ann lies within Essex County. Anchored by the city of Gloucester, the nexus of the local fishing industry, other towns on Cape Ann include Rockport, at the tip of the cape, and the towns of Essex and Manchester-by-the-Sea, which are located where Cape Ann joins the mainland.

== Geography ==
At the end of Cape Ann, and splitting Gloucester into two parts, is the Annisquam River. Many locals who live in Gloucester and Rockport refer to the land east of the Annisquam as "The Island". The aforementioned island is, however, an artificial island, made so by the constructions of the Blynman Canal on the southern end of the river.

== Popular culture ==
Cape Ann is the subject of the folk song 'Cape Ann', which may have been written by Maine-based folk singer Gordon Bok. It describes a sailor and his negative feelings towards both Cape Ann and the sailors who sail around it. It has been recorded by musicians such as The Irish Rovers, Gordon Bok, and The X-Seaman's Institute (formed as part of the South Street Seaport).

Cape Ann is the location of the fictional town of Sea Harbor, the setting of the Seaside Knitters mysteries by author Sally Goldenbaum. Sea Harbor is on the coast, with Gloucester as its nearest neighbor town. Cape Ann is also featured as the setting for the Harry Chapin song "Dogtown," which is also the name for an abandoned town on the Cape.

The book Slaughterhouse Five mentions Cape Ann as the honeymoon location for the main character Billy Pilgrim.

The movie The Perfect Storm was filmed in Gloucester in 2000. Setting out for the one last catch that will make up for a lackluster fishing season, Captain Billy Tyne (George Clooney) pushes his boat, the Andrea Gail, out to the waters of the Flemish Cap off Nova Scotia; based on actual events in 1991.

Cape Ann is also the location of main character's home in the book Trouble.

Cape Ann is the title of the fifth and final section of T. S. Eliot's poem, "Landscapes," which lists the coastal birds of the region. Additionally, the title of his poem The Dry Salvages refers to a cluster of rocks "off the N.E. coast of Cape Ann, Massachusetts."

The fictional town of Paradise, setting of the Jesse Stone novels, is near Cape Ann, which is briefly mentioned in Night and Day.

Cape Ann lends its name to a fictional coastal Maine town in the 1959 movie, "It Happened to Jane," starring Doris Day and Jack Lemmon.

Manchester by the Sea was filmed in the seaside towns in Cape Ann.
