= Massachusetts Bay Colony =

Former English colony in North America

- 1628–1691; Part of Dominion of New England, 1686–1689
- Flag Seal

- Location in New England, c. 1690
- Status: Disestablished
- Capital: Salem, Charlestown, Boston
- Common languages: English, Massachusett, Mi'kmaq
- Religion: Congregationalism (official) Puritanism
- Government: Self-governing colony
- Governor
  - 1629–1631: John Endecott (first)
  - 1679–1692: Simon Bradstreet (last)
- Legislature: Great and General Court or Assembly of Massachusetts Bay
  - Upper House (de facto): Council of Assistants
  - Lower House (de facto): Assembly
- Historical era: British colonization of the Americas; Puritan migration to New England (1620–1640)
  - Council for New England land grant: 1628
  - Charter issued: 1629
  - New England Confederation formed: 1643
  - Forced Secession of Norfolk County: 1680
  - Revocation of the Royal Charter: 1684
  - Dominion of New England established: 1686
  - Dominion dissolved: 1689
  - Massachusetts Charter for the Province of Massachusetts Bay: 1691
  - Disestablished, reorganized as the Province of Massachusetts Bay: 1691
- Currency: Pound sterling Pine Tree Shilling
Succeeded by
Dominion of New England; Province of Massachusetts Bay
- Today part of: Massachusetts; Maine; New Hampshire

The Massachusetts Bay Colony (1628–1691), more formally the Colony of Massachusetts Bay, was an English settlement on the east coast of North America around Massachusetts Bay, a territory inhabited by Algonquian Native American tribes. The colony was in a territory the colonists called New England, with initial settlements on two natural harbors and surrounding land about 15.4 miles (24.8 km) apart—the areas around Salem and Boston, north of the previously established Plymouth Colony. The territory nominally administered by the Massachusetts Bay Colony covered much of central New England, including portions of what are now Massachusetts, Maine, New Hampshire, and Connecticut. The territory of the Massachusetts Bay colony was one of the several colonial territories reorganized as the Province of Massachusetts Bay in 1691.

The colony was founded by the Massachusetts Bay Company—a joint-stock company established by English royal charter. The company included investors in the failed Dorchester Company, which had established a short-lived settlement on Cape Ann in 1623; the Massachusetts Bay Colony was therefore a second attempt at colonization five years later. It was successful, with about 20,000 people migrating to New England in the 1630s. The population was Puritan and was governed largely by a small group of leaders strongly influenced by Puritan teachings. It was the first slave-holding colony in New England, and its governors were elected by an electorate limited to freemen who had been formally admitted to the local church. As a consequence, the colonial leadership showed little tolerance for other religious views, including Anglican, Quaker, and Baptist theologies.

The colonists maintained relations with the Massachusett and other Algonquians of the Northeastern Woodlands and sought to convert them to Christianity; however, they did join their neighbor colonies in the Pequot War (1636–1638) and King Philip's War (1675–1678). After that, most of the tribes of southern New England made peace treaties with the colonists or were sold into slavery after King Philip's War (apart from the Pequot tribe, whose survivors were largely absorbed into the Narragansett and Mohegan tribes following the Pequot War).

The Massachusetts Bay Colony was economically successful, trading with England, Mexico, and the West Indies. In addition to barter, transactions were done in English pounds, Spanish "pieces of eight", and wampum in the 1640s. In 1652, a currency shortage prompted the colony to authorize silversmith John Hull to issue coinage, now known as the oak tree, willow tree, and pine tree shillings.

Political differences with England after the English Restoration led to the forced separation of the northern county as the Province of New Hampshire in 1680 and the revocation of the colonial charter in 1684. King James II established the Dominion of New England in 1686 to bring all of the New England colonies under firmer crown control. The Dominion collapsed after the Glorious Revolution of 1688 deposed James, and the Massachusetts Bay Colony reverted to rule under its revoked charter until 1691, when a new charter was issued for the Province of Massachusetts Bay. This new province combined the Massachusetts Bay territories with those of the Plymouth Colony and proprietary holdings on Nantucket and Martha's Vineyard. Sir William Phips arrived in 1692 bearing the charter and formally took charge of the new province, when the colony, beginning in Salem Village, was coming to grips with the witch trials crises.

== History ==
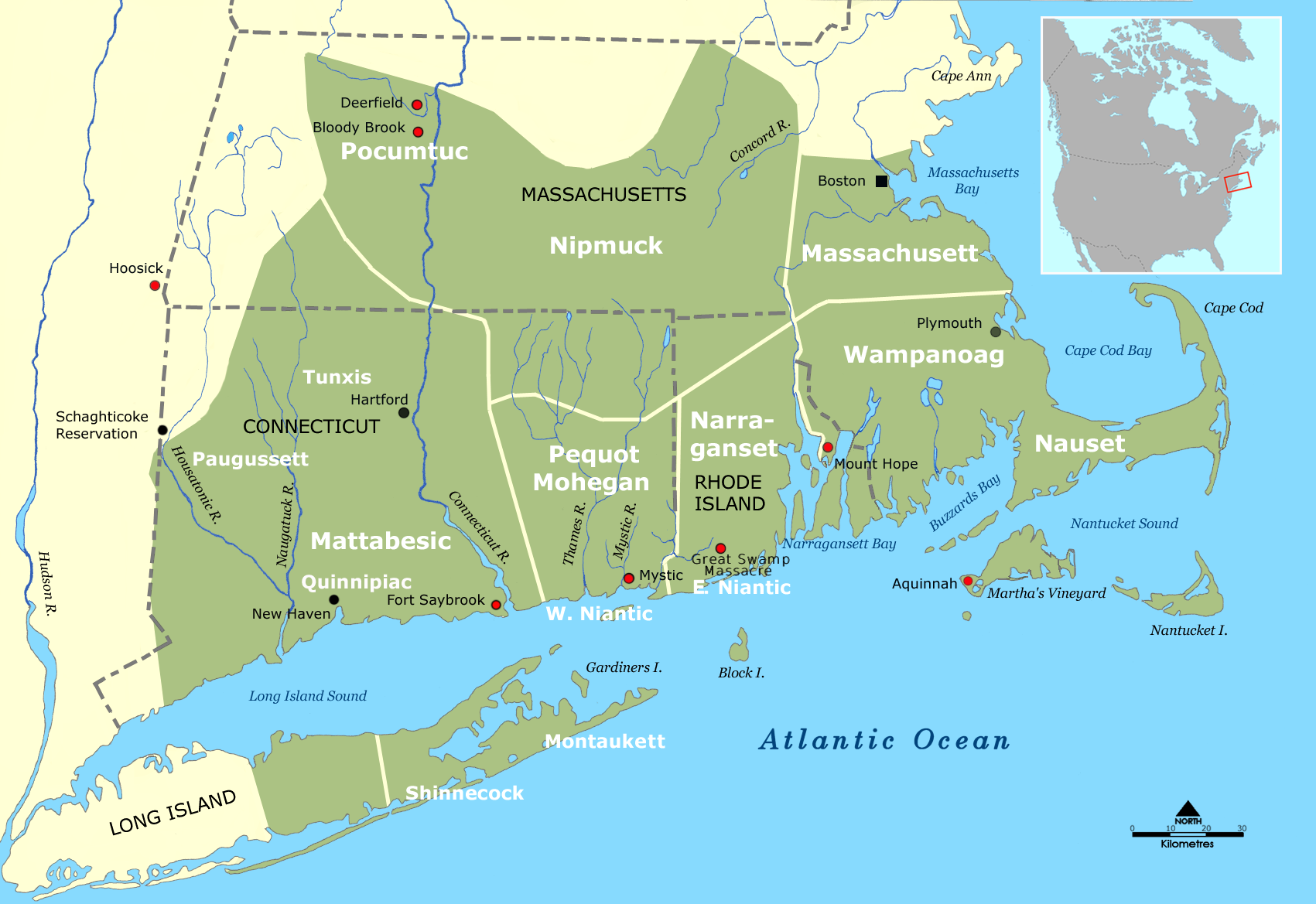
Map depicting tribal distribution in southern New England, c. 1600; the political boundaries shown are modern

Before the arrival of European colonists on the eastern shore of New England, the area around Massachusetts Bay was the territory of several Algonquian-speaking peoples, including the Massachusetts, Nausets, and Wampanoags. The Pennacooks occupied the Merrimack River valley to the north and the Nipmucs, Pocumtucs, and Mahicans occupied the western lands of Massachusetts, although some of those tribes were under tribute to the Mohawks, who were expanding aggressively from upstate New York. The total Indigenous population in 1620 has been estimated to be 7,000. This number was significantly larger as late as 1616; in later years, contemporaneous chroniclers interviewed Indigenous people who described a major pestilence which killed as many as two-thirds of the population. The land-use patterns of the Indigenous people included plots cleared for agricultural purposes and woodland territories for hunting game. Land divisions among the tribes were well understood.

During the early 17th century, several European explorers charted the area, including Samuel de Champlain and John Smith. Plans began in 1606 for the first permanent British settlements on the east coast of North America. On April 10, 1606, King James I of England granted a charter forming two joint-stock companies. Neither of these corporations was given a name by this charter, but the territories were named as the "first Colony" and "second Colony", over which they were respectively authorized to settle and to govern. Under this charter, the "first Colony" and the "second Colony" were to be ruled by a Council composed of 13 individuals in each colony. The charter provided for an additional council of 13 persons named "Council of Virginia" which had overarching responsibility for the combined enterprise.

The "first Colony" ranged from the 34th- to 41st-degree latitude north; the "second Colony" ranged from the 38th- to 45th-degree latitude. (The "first Colony" and the "second Colony" overlapped. The 1629 charter of King Charles I asserted that the second Colony ranged from 40th to 48th degrees north latitude, which reduced the overlap.) Investors from London were appointed to govern over any settlements in the "first Colony"; investors from the "Town of Plimouth in the County of Devon" were appointed to govern over any settlements in the "second Colony". The London Company proceeded to establish Jamestown. The Plymouth Company under the guidance of Sir Ferdinando Gorges covered the more northern area, including New England, and established the Sagadahoc Colony in 1607 in Maine. The experience proved exceptionally difficult for the 120 settlers, however, and the surviving colonists abandoned the colony after only one year. Gorges noted that "there was no more speech of settling plantations in those parts" for a number of years. English ships continued to come to the New England area for fishing and trade with the Indigenous population.

=== Plymouth Colony ===
In December 1620, a group of English religious Separatists, later referred to as "the Pilgrims", established Plymouth Colony just to the south of Massachusetts Bay, seeking to preserve their cultural identity and attain religious freedom. Plymouth's colonists faced great hardships and earned few profits for their investors, who sold their interests to them in 1627. Edward Winslow and William Bradford were two of the colony's leaders and were likely the authors of a work published in England in 1622 called Mourt's Relation. This book in some ways resembles a promotional tract intended to encourage further immigration. Plymouth Colony would remain separate from Massachusetts Bay Colony until the creation of the Province of Massachusetts Bay.

=== Wessagusett Colony ===
There were other attempts at colonies more closely tied to England in 1623 and 1624 at Weymouth, Massachusetts. Thomas Weston's Wessagusset Colony failed in under a year. An effort by Robert Gorges to establish an overarching civil and religious colonial structure for New England based in the same location likewise failed and most of the settlers left. Those families who remained after the departure of Gorges formed a permanent settlement the oldest in what would become Massachusetts Bay Colony.

=== Cape Ann settlement ===
In 1623, the Plymouth Council for New England, the successor to the Plymouth Company, established a small fishing village at Cape Ann under the supervision of the Dorchester Company, with Thomas Gardner as its overseer. This company was originally organized through the efforts of Puritan minister John White (1575–1648) of Dorchester, in the English county of Dorset. White has been called "the father of the Massachusetts Colony" because of his influence in establishing this settlement, even though he never emigrated. The Cape Ann settlement was not profitable, and the financial backers of the Dorchester Company terminated their support by the end of 1625. Their settlement was abandoned at present-day Gloucester, but a few settlers remained in the area, including Roger Conant, establishing a settlement a little further south at what is now Salem, near the village of the Naumkeag tribe.

=== Legal formation of the colony ===
Archbishop William Laud was a favorite advisor of King Charles I and a dedicated Anglican, and he sought to suppress the religious practices of Puritans and other nonconforming beliefs in England. The persecution of many Puritans in the 1620s led them to believe that religious reform would not be possible while Charles was king, and many decided to seek a new life in the New World.

John White continued to seek funding for a colony. On 19 March 1628 [O.S. 1627], the Council for New England issued a land grant to a new group of investors that included a few from the Dorchester Company. The land grant was for territory between the Charles River and Merrimack River that extended from "the Atlantick and westerne sea and ocean on the east parte, to the South sea on the west parte". The company to whom the grant was sold was styled "The New England Company for a Plantation in Massachusetts Bay". The company elected Matthew Cradock as its first governor and immediately began organizing provisions and recruiting settlers.

The company sent approximately 100 new settlers with provisions to join Conant in 1628, led by Governor's Assistant John Endecott, one of the grantees. The next year, Naumkeag was renamed Salem and fortified by another 300 settlers led by Rev. Francis Higginson, one of the first ministers of the settlement. The first winters were difficult, with colonists struggling against starvation and disease, resulting in numerous deaths.

The company leaders sought a royal charter for the colony because they were concerned about the legality of conflicting land claims given to several companies (including the New England Company) for the little-known territories of the New World, and because of the increasing number of Puritans who wanted to join them. Charles granted the new charter on 4 March 1629 [O.S. 1628], superseding the land grant and establishing a legal basis for the new English colony at Massachusetts, appointing Endecott as governor. It was not apparent whether Charles knew that the company was meant to support the Puritan emigration, and he was likely left to assume that it was purely for business purposes, as was the custom. The charter omitted a significant clause: the location for the annual stockholders' meeting. Charles dissolved Parliament in 1629, whereupon the company's directors met to consider the possibility of moving the company's seat of governance to the colony. This was followed later that year by the Cambridge Agreement, in which a group of investors agreed to emigrate and work to buy out others who would not emigrate.

The Massachusetts Bay Colony became the first English chartered colony whose board of governors did not reside in England. This independence helped the settlers to maintain their Puritan religious practices without interference from the king, Archbishop Laud, or the Anglican Church of England. The charter remained in force for 55 years; Charles II revoked it in 1684, following several years of negative reports from Edward Randolph and Edward Cranfield. Parliament passed legislation collectively called the Navigation Acts which attempted to prevent the colonists from trading with any nation other than England. Colonial resistance to those acts led King Charles to revoke the Massachusetts charter and consolidate all the colonies in New England, New York, and New Jersey into the Dominion of New England.

Territory claimed but never administered by the colonial government extended theoretically as far west as the Pacific Ocean. The Dutch colony of New Netherland disputed many of its territorial claims, arguing that they held rights to land beyond Rhode Island up to the western side of Cape Cod, under the jurisdiction of Plymouth Colony at the time.

=== Colonial history ===
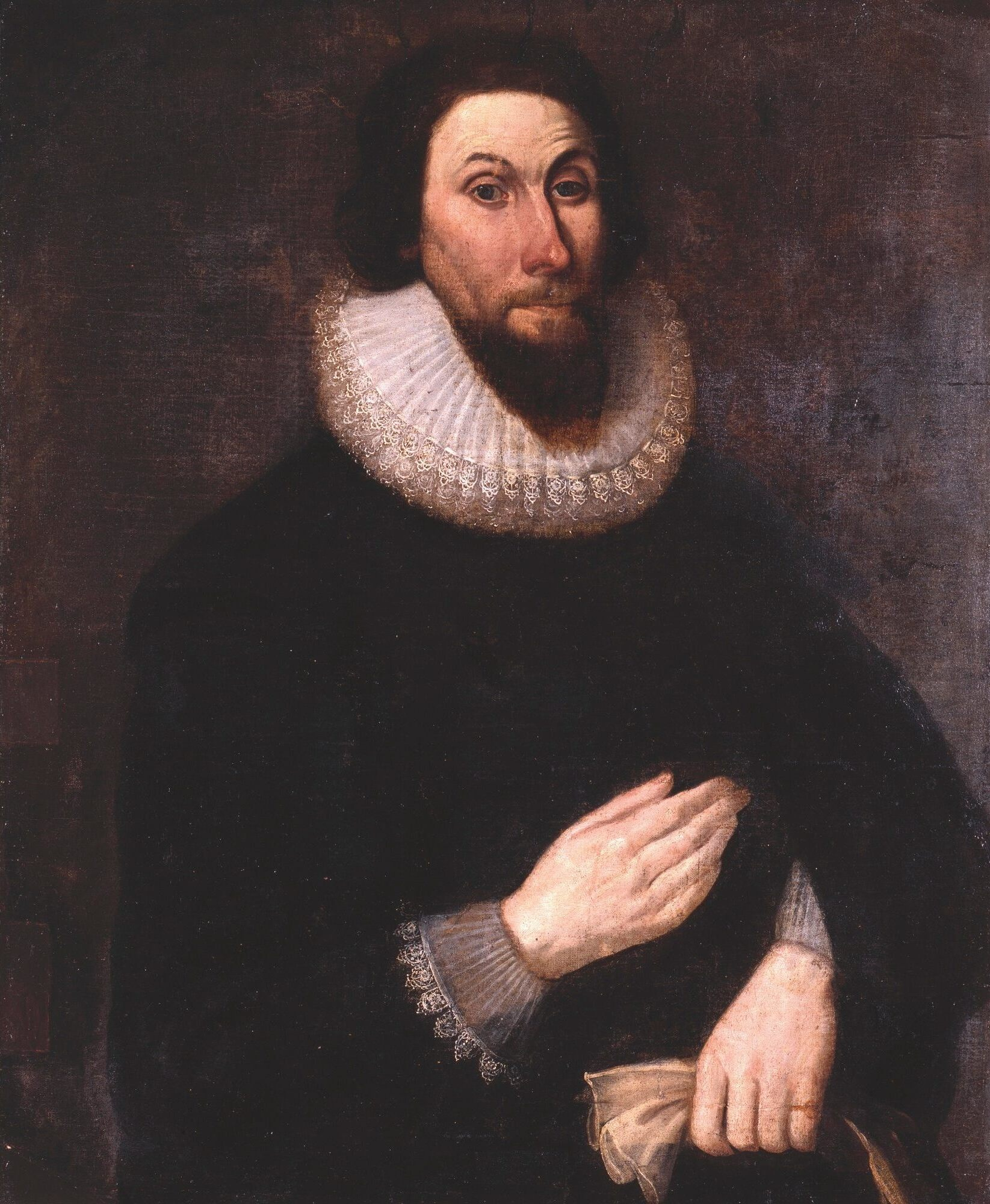
John Winthrop, who led the first large wave of colonists from England in 1630 and served as governor for 12 of the colony's first 20 years

A flotilla of ships sailed from England beginning in April 1630, sometimes known as the Winthrop Fleet. They began arriving at Salem in June and carried more than 700 colonists, Governor John Winthrop, and the colonial charter. Winthrop delivered his famous sermon "City upon a Hill" either before or during the voyage.

Over the next ten years, about 20,000 Puritans emigrated from England to Massachusetts and the neighboring colonies during the Great Migration. Many ministers reacted to the repressive religious policies of England, making the trip with their congregations, among whom were John Cotton, Roger Williams, Thomas Hooker, and others. Religious divisions and the need for additional land prompted a number of new settlements that resulted in Connecticut Colony (by Hooker) and the Colony of Rhode Island and Providence Plantations (by Williams and others). Minister John Wheelwright was banished after the Antinomian controversy (like Anne Hutchinson), and he moved north to found Exeter, New Hampshire.

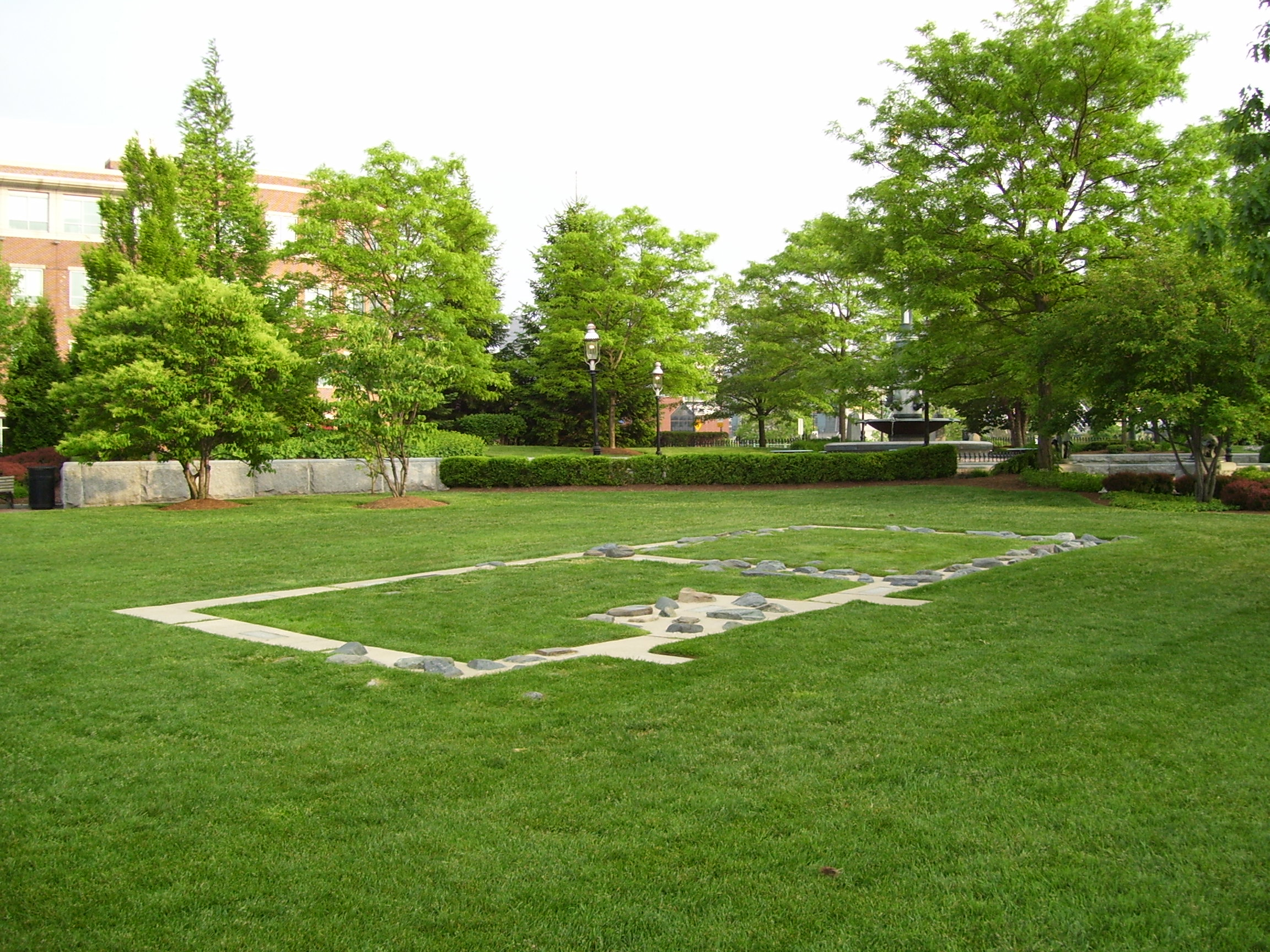
This is the site of the "Great House" near the corner of New Rutherford Avenue and Chelsea Avenue, Charlestown, Massachusetts. It was the home of John Winthrop and also served as the first seat of government in the colony.

The advent of the Wars of the Three Kingdoms in 1639 brought a halt to major migration, and a significant number of men returned to England to fight in the war. Massachusetts authorities were sympathetic to the Parliamentary cause and had generally positive relationships with the governments of the English Commonwealth and the Protectorate of Oliver Cromwell. The colony's economy began to diversify in the 1640s, as the fur trading, lumber, and fishing industries found markets in Europe and the West Indies, and the colony's shipbuilding industry developed. The growth of a generation of people born in the colony and the rise of a merchant class began to slowly change the political and cultural landscape of the colony, even though its governance continued to be dominated by relatively conservative Puritans.

Colonial support for the Commonwealth created tension after the throne was restored to Charles II in 1660. Charles sought to extend royal influence over the colonies. He sent over the Carr-Cartwright Commission in 1665 to investigate the colony. However, Massachusetts resisted along with other colonies. For example, the Massachusetts Bay colony repeatedly refused requests by Charles and his agents to allow the Church of England to become established, and the New England colonies generally resisted the Navigation Acts, laws that restricted colonial trade to England alone.

The New England colonies were ravaged by King Philip's War (1675–76), when the Indigenous peoples of southern New England rose up against the colonists and were decisively defeated, although at great cost in life to all concerned. The Massachusetts frontier was particularly hard hit: several communities in the Connecticut and Swift River valleys were abandoned. By the end of the war, most of the Indigenous population of southern New England made peace treaties with the colonists.

=== Confrontation with England ===
England had difficulty enforcing its laws and regulations in the Massachusetts Bay colony, as it was a joint-stock colony which was unlike the royal colonies and proprietary colonies that the English crown administered. Massachusetts Bay was largely self-governing with its own house of deputies, governor, and other self-appointed officers. The colony also did not keep its headquarters and oversight in London but moved them to the colony. The Massachusetts Bay colonists viewed themselves as something apart from their "mother country" of England because of this tradition of self-rule, coupled with the theocratic nature of New England Puritan society. The Puritan founders of Massachusetts and Plymouth saw themselves as having been divinely given their lands in the New World with a duty to implement and observe religious law.

English colonists took control of New Netherland in 1664, and the crown sent royal commissioners to New England from the new Province of New York to investigate the status of the government and legal system of the colonies. These commissioners were to bring the New England colonies into a stronger connection with England, including allowing the crown to nominate the governor of the colony. The New England colonists refused, claiming that the King had no right to "supervise" Massachusetts Bay's laws and courts, and saying that they ought to continue as they were so long as they remained within the legal rights and privileges of their charter. The Commissioners asked that the colony pay its obligated 20 percent of all gold and silver found in New England, but the colonists responded that they were "not obligated to the king but by civility".

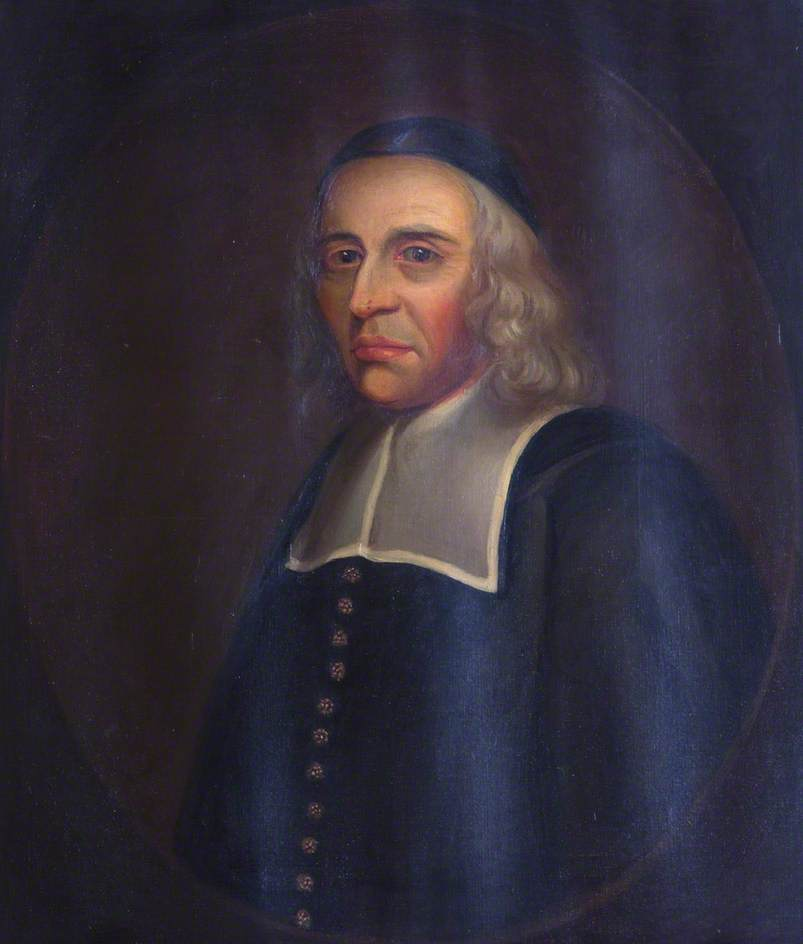
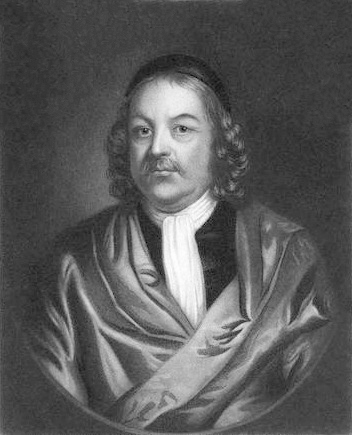
Massachusetts Bay Governors John Leverett (left) and Simon Bradstreet (right). Leverett was of the more hard-line autonomist faction of New England Puritans and Bradstreet the more moderate and reform-oriented group.

Massachusetts Bay extended the right to vote only to Puritan freemen, but the population of the colony was increasing and the non-Puritan population was growing along with it; thus, tensions and conflicts were growing concerning the future direction of the colony. Many wealthy merchants and colonists wished to expand their economic base and commercial interests and saw the conservative Puritan leadership as thwarting that. Even in Puritan society, the younger generation wished to liberalize society in a way that would help with commerce. Those who wanted Massachusetts Bay and New England to be a place for religious observance and theocracy were most hostile to any change in governance. The Crown learned of these divisions and sought to include non-Puritans in the leadership in the hope of managing the colony.

The charges of insubordination against the colony included denying the crown's authority to legislate in New England, asserting that Massachusetts Bay was governing in the Province of New Hampshire and Maine, and denying freedom of conscience. However, chief among the colonists' transgressions were the coining of money (the pine tree shilling) and their violations of the Navigation Acts, which had been passed by Parliament to regulate trade within the English colonial empire. These regulations determined whom the colonies could trade with and how trade could be conducted, and New England merchants were flaunting them by trading directly with European powers. This infuriated many English merchants, commercial societies, and Royal committees who petitioned the King for action, claiming that the New England colonists were hurting their trade. The Lords of Trade's complaints were so serious that the King sent Edward Randolph to Boston in an attempt to rein in and regulate the colony. When he arrived in Boston, he found a colonial government that refused to give in to the royal demands.

Randolph reported to London that the General Court of Massachusetts Bay claimed that the King had no right to interfere with their commercial dealings. In response, Randolph asked the crown to cut off all trade to and from the colony and asked that further regulations be put in place. The crown did not wish to enforce such a harsh measure and risk alienating the moderate members of New England society who supported England, so the British offered conciliatory measures if Massachusetts Bay followed the law. Massachusetts Bay refused, and the Lords of Trade became wary of the colony's charter; they petitioned the crown to either revoke it or amend it. Randolph was made head of Customs and Surveyor General of New England, with his office in Boston. Despite this increased pressure, the General Court established laws that allowed merchants to circumvent Randolph's authority. Adding to Randolph's frustration was his reliance on the Admiralty Court to rule on the laws that he was attempting to enforce. The moderate faction of the General Court, including Simon Bradstreet and William Stoughton, was supportive of Randolph and the changes that the crown wished to make, but the conservatives, led by Thomas Danforth and Richard Waldron, remained too powerful and blocked any attempt to side with England. However, as the tensions mounted between the crown and Massachusetts Bay, and threats mounted of legal action against the colony, the General Court did pass laws that acknowledged certain English admiralty laws while still making allowance for self-governance.

Partially to weaken Massachusetts and partially to help enforce the Navigation Acts, King Charles II forced the separation of Old Norfolk County into a new province. This was the Province of New Hampshire which was supposed to be more directly controlled by the Crown. The backlash to Edward Cranfield was so fierce that pro-Massachusetts partisans launched Gove's Rebellion.

==== Revocation of the charter ====
Two delegates from Massachusetts Bay were sent to London to meet with the Lords of Trade when the crown threatened the colony with a quo warranto. The Lords demanded a supplementary charter to alleviate problems, but the delegates were under orders that they could not negotiate any change with the Charter and this enraged the Lords. The quo warranto was issued immediately. The King feared that this would stir problems within the colony and attempted to reassure the colonists that their private interests would not be infringed upon. The declaration did create problems, however, and the confrontations increased between the moderates and conservatives. The moderates controlled the office of the Governor and the Council of Assistants, and the conservatives controlled the Assembly of Deputies. This political turmoil ended in a compromise with the deputies voting to allow the delegates in London to negotiate and defend the colonial charter.

When the warrant arrived in Boston, the General Court voted on what course the colony should take. The two options were to immediately submit to royal authority and dismantle their government or to wait for the crown to revoke their charter and install a new governmental system. The General Court decided to wait out the crown. They lacked a legal basis to continue their government, yet it remained intact until its official revocation in 1686.

=== Unifications and restoration ===
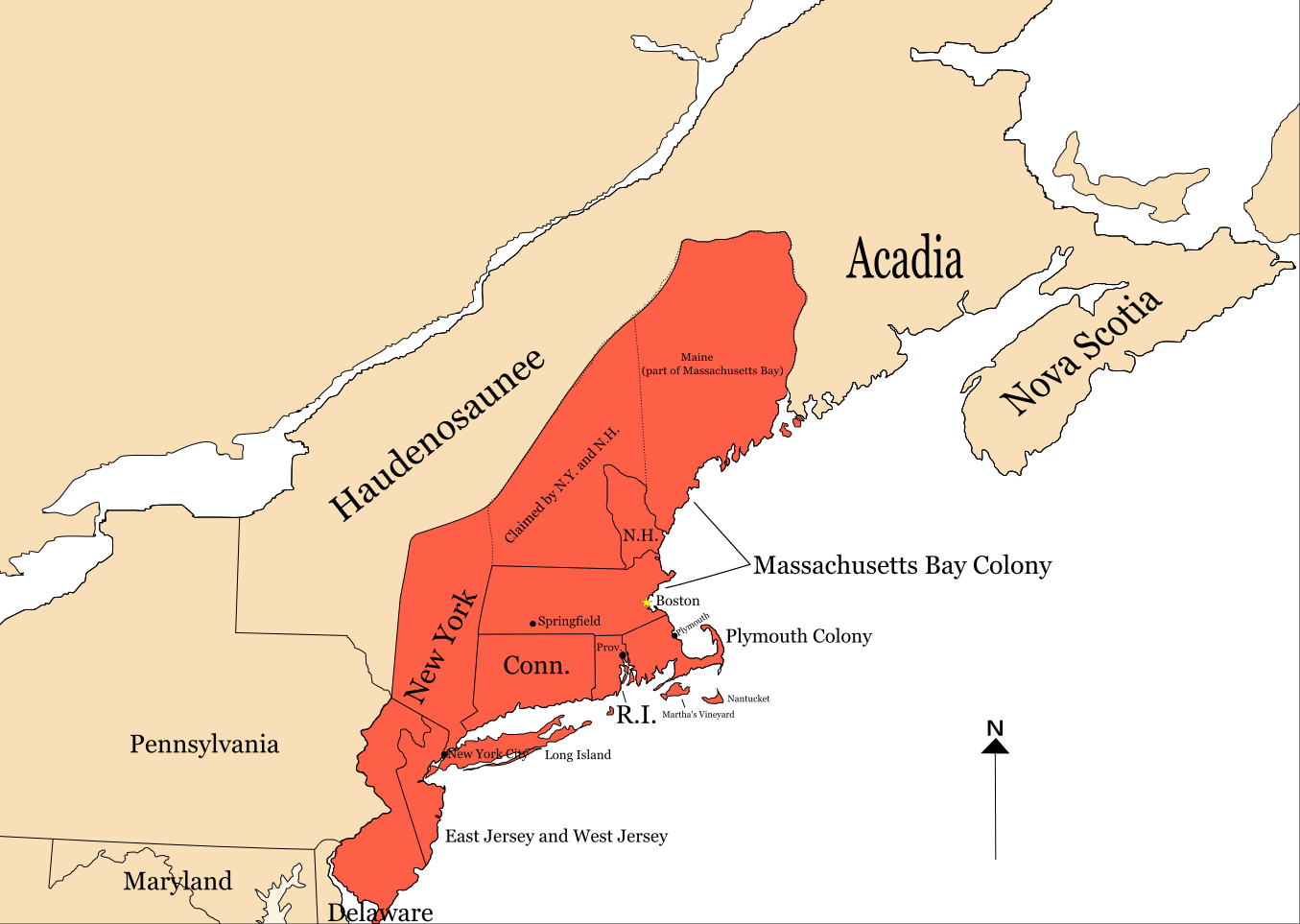
Dominion of New England in 1688

James II of England united Massachusetts with the other New England colonies in the Dominion of New England in 1686. The dominion was governed by Sir Edmund Andros without any local representation beyond his own hand-picked councillors, and it was extremely unpopular throughout New England. Massachusetts authorities arrested Andros in April 1689 after the 1688 Glorious Revolution in England, and they re-established government under the forms of the vacated charter. However, dissenters from the Puritan rule argued that the government lacked a proper constitutional foundation, and some of its actions were resisted on that basis.

King William III issued a charter in 1691, despite efforts by Massachusetts agents to revive the old colonial charter. It was chiefly negotiated by Increase Mather in his role as the colony's ambassador-extraordinary, unifying Massachusetts Bay with Plymouth Colony, Martha's Vineyard, Nantucket, and territories that roughly encompass Maine, New Brunswick, and Nova Scotia to form the Province of Massachusetts Bay. This new charter additionally extended voting rights to non-Puritans, an outcome that Mather had tried to avoid.

== Life ==
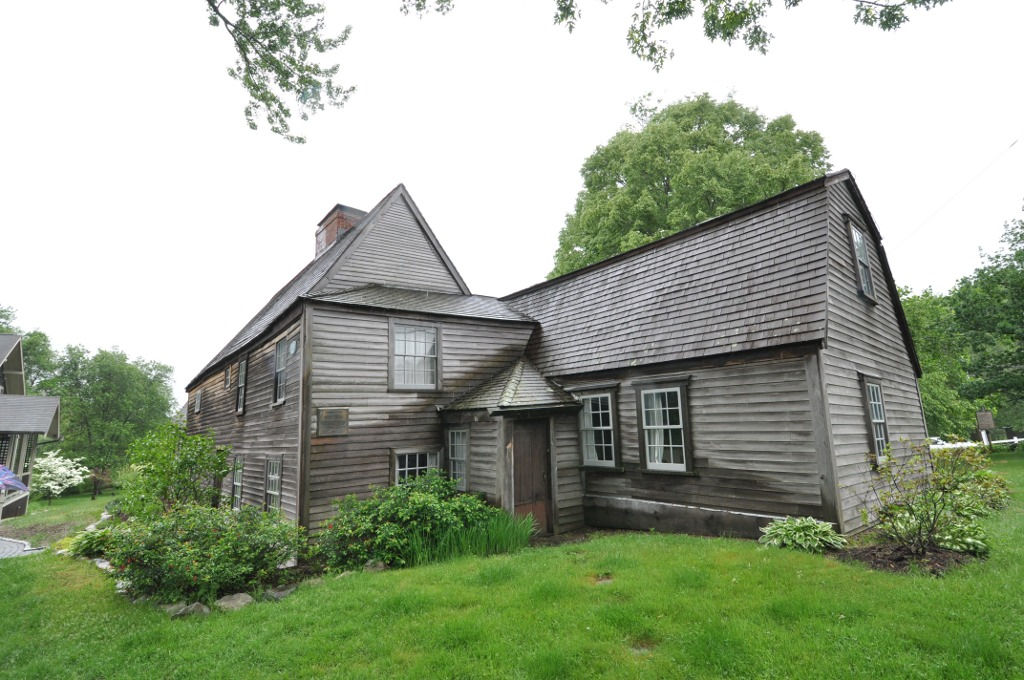
Constructed in 1641, the Fairbanks House is a First Period home with clapboard siding

=== Architecture ===
Life could be quite difficult in the early years of the colony. Many colonists lived in fairly crude structures, including dugouts, wigwams, and dirt-floor huts made using wattle and daub construction. Construction improved in later years, and houses began to be sheathed in clapboard, with thatch or plank roofs and wooden chimneys following English styles. Wealthier individuals would extend their house by adding a lean-to on the back, which allowed a larger kitchen (possibly with a brick or stone chimney including an oven), additional rooms, and a sleeping loft. These houses were the precursors to what is now called the saltbox style of architecture. Interiors became more elaborate in later years, with plaster walls, wainscoting, and potentially expensive turned woodwork in the most expensive homes. On the frontier of the colony, the garrison style house developed to provide protection to the inhabitants.

=== Town Life ===
Colonists arriving after the first wave found that the early towns did not have room for them. Seeking land of their own, groups of families would petition the government for land on which to establish a new town; the government would typically allow the group's leaders to select the land. These grants were typically about 40 square miles (10,000 ha), and were located sufficiently near other towns to facilitate defense and social support. The group leaders would also be responsible for acquiring native title to the lands that they selected. By this means, the colony expanded into the interior, spawning settlements in adjacent territories as well.

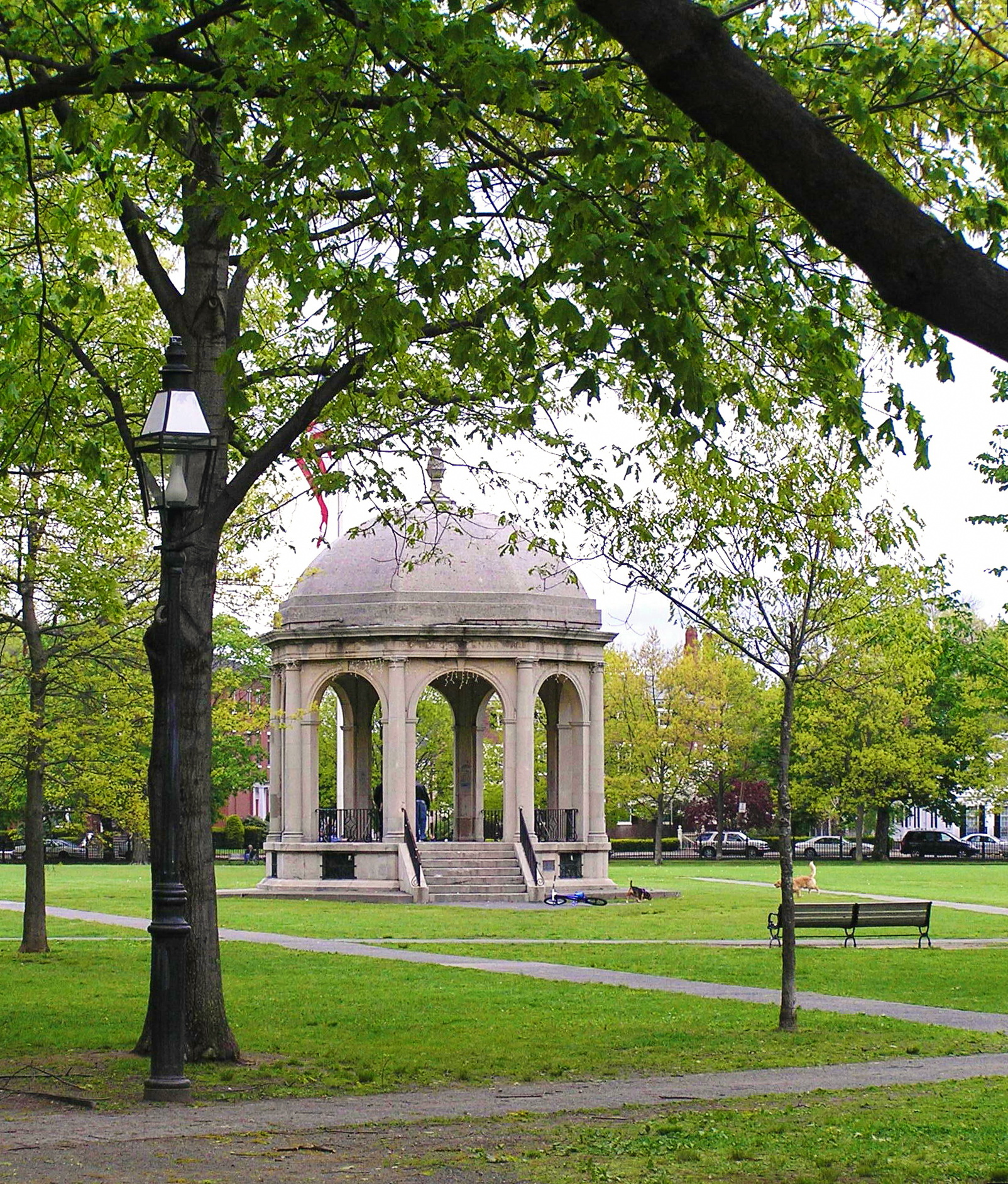
Salem Common was established as a village green in 1667

The land within a town would be divided by communal agreement, usually allocating by methods that originated in England. Outside a town center, land would be allocated for farming, some of which might be held communally. Farmers with large plots of land might build a house near their properties on the outskirts of the town. A town center that was well laid out would be fairly compact, with a tavern, school, possibly some small shops, and a meeting house that was used for civic and religious functions. The meeting house would be the center of the town's political and religious life. Church services might be held for several hours on Wednesday and all day Sunday. Puritans did not observe annual holidays, especially Christmas, which they said had pagan roots. Annual town meetings would be held at the meeting house, generally in May, to elect the town's representatives to the general court and to transact other community business. Towns often had a village green, used for outdoor celebrations and activities such as military exercises of the town's trainband or militia.

=== Marriage and family life ===
Many of the early colonists who migrated from England came with some or all of their family. It was expected that individuals would marry fairly young and begin producing offspring. Infant mortality rates were comparatively low, as were instances of childhood death. Men who lost their wives often remarried fairly quickly, especially if they had children needing care. Older widows would also sometimes marry for financial security. It was also normal for older widowed parents to live with one of their children. Due to the Puritan perception of marriage as a civil union, divorce did sometimes occur and could be pursued by both genders.

Sexual activity was expected to be confined to marriage. Sex outside of marriage was considered fornication if neither partner was married, and adultery if one or both were married to someone else. Fornication was generally punished by fines and pressure to marry; a woman who gave birth to an illegitimate child could also be fined. Adultery and rape were more serious crimes, and both were punishable by death. Rape, however, required more than one witness, and was therefore rarely prosecuted. Sexual activity between men was called sodomy, and was also punishable by death.

Within the marriage, the husband was typically responsible for supplying the family's financial needs, although it was not uncommon for women to work in the fields and to perform some home labor (for example, spinning thread or weaving cloth) to supplement the family income. Women were almost exclusively responsible for seeing to the welfare of the children.

Children were baptized at the local meeting house within a week of being born. The mother was usually not present because she was still recovering from the birth, and the child's name was usually chosen by the father. Names were propagated within the family, and names would be reused when infants died. If an adult died without issue, his (or her) name could be carried on when the siblings of the deceased named children in his or her memory.

=== Education ===
Most children received some form of schooling, something which the colony's founders believed to be important for forming a proper relationship with God. Towns were obligated to provide education for their children, under the Massachusetts School Laws which was usually satisfied by hiring a teacher of some sort. The quality of these instructors varied, from minimally educated local people to Harvard-educated ministers.

One of the first books published in the United States was The New England Primer. It was intended to promote children's literacy.

Some of the oldest schools in Massachusetts trace back to the Massachusetts Bay Colony. The Boston Latin School was founded in 1635. Other schools include the Roxbury Latin School and the Hopkins Academy.

== Government ==
The structure of the colonial government changed over the lifetime of the charter. The Puritans established a theocratic government limited to church members, although ministers were barred from holding governmental positions. Winthrop, Dudley, the Rev. John Cotton, and other leaders sought to prevent dissenting religious views, and many were banished because of differing religious beliefs, including Roger Williams of Salem and Anne Hutchinson of Boston, and unrepentant Quakers and Anabaptists. By the mid-1640s, Massachusetts Bay Colony had grown to more than 20,000 inhabitants.

The charter granted the general court the authority to elect officers and to make laws for the colony. Its first meeting in North America was held in October 1630, but it was attended by only eight freemen. They formed the first council of assistants and voted (contrary to the terms of the charter) that they should elect the governor and deputy from among themselves. The general court determined at the next session that it would elect the governor and deputy.

An additional 116 settlers were admitted to the general court as freemen in 1631, but most of the governing and judicial power remained with the council of assistants. They also enacted a law specifying that only those men who "are members of some of the churches" in the colony were eligible to become freemen and gain the vote. This restriction was not changed until after the English Restoration. The process by which individuals became members of one of the colony's churches involved a detailed questioning by the church elders of their beliefs and religious experiences; as a result, only individuals whose religious views accorded with those of the church leadership were likely to become members and gain the ability to vote in the colony. After a protest over the imposition of taxes by a meeting of the council of assistants, the general court ordered each town to send two representatives known as deputies to meet with the court to discuss matters of taxation.

Questions of governance and representation arose again in 1634 when several deputies demanded to see the charter, which the assistants had kept hidden from public view. The deputies learned of the provisions that the general court should make all laws, and that all freemen should be members of the general court. They then demanded that the charter be enforced to the letter, which Governor Winthrop pointed out was impractical given the growing number of freemen. The parties reached a compromise and agreed that the general court would be made up of two deputies representing each town. Dudley was elected governor in 1634, and the general court reserved a large number of powers for itself, including those of taxation, distribution of land, and the admission of freemen.

A legal case in 1642 brought about the separation of the council of assistants into an upper house of the general court. The case involved a widow's lost pig and had been overturned by the general court, but the assistants voted as a body to veto the general court's act. The consequence of the ensuing debate was that the general court voted in 1644 that the council of assistants would sit and deliberate separately from the general court (they had sat together until then), and both bodies must concur for any legislation to be passed. Judicial appeals were to be decided by a joint session, since otherwise the assistants would be in the position to veto attempts to overturn their own decisions.

The King and the British government held enough power in Massachusetts Bay in the 1630s that Puritans and others were afraid of being sent home if they got word of unorthodox beliefs such as what Roger Williams expounded.

=== Laws and judiciary ===
During 1641, the colony formally adopted the Massachusetts Body of Liberties, which Nathaniel Ward compiled. This document consisted of 100 civil and criminal laws based upon the social sanctions recorded in the Bible. These laws formed the nucleus of colonial legislation until independence and contained some provisions later incorporated into the United States Constitution, such as the ideas of equal protection and double jeopardy.

Massachusetts Bay was the first colony to formalize laws concerning slavery with provision 91 of the Massachusetts Body of Liberties which developed protections for people unable to perform public service. Another law was developed to protect married women, children, and people with mental disabilities from making financial decisions. Colonial law differentiated among types of mental disabilities, classifying them as "distracted persons", "idiots", and "lunaticks". In 1693, "poor laws" enabled communities to use the estates of people with disabilities to defer the cost of community support of those individuals. Many of these laws remained until the American Revolution.

Many behaviors were frowned upon culturally which modern sensibilities might consider relatively trivial actions, and some led to criminal prosecution. These included sleeping during church services, playing cards, and engaging in any number of activities on the Sabbath. Conversely, there were laws which reflected attitudes that are still endorsed by popular sensibilities in the 21st century US, against things such as smoking tobacco, abusing one's mother-in-law, profane dancing, and pulling hair. Children, newcomers, and people with disabilities were exempt from punishment for such infractions.

The colony's council of assistants sat as the final court of appeal and as the principal court for criminal issues of "life, limb, or banishment" and civil issues where the damages exceeded £100. Lesser offenses were heard in county courts or by commissioners appointed for hearing minor disputes. The lower courts were also responsible for issuing licenses and for matters such as probate. Juries were authorized to decide questions of both fact and law, although the court could decide if a jury failed to reach a decision. Sentences for offenses included fines and corporal punishments such as whipping and sitting in the stocks, with the punishments of banishment from the colony and death by hanging reserved for the most serious offenses. Evidence was sometimes based on hearsay and superstition. For example, the "ordeal of touch" was used in 1646 in which someone accused of murder is forced to touch the dead body; if blood appears, the accused is deemed guilty. This was used to convict and execute a woman accused of murdering her newborn child. Bodies of individuals hanged for piracy were sometimes gibbeted (publicly displayed) on harbor islands visible to seagoing vessels.

=== Notable criminal prosecutions ===
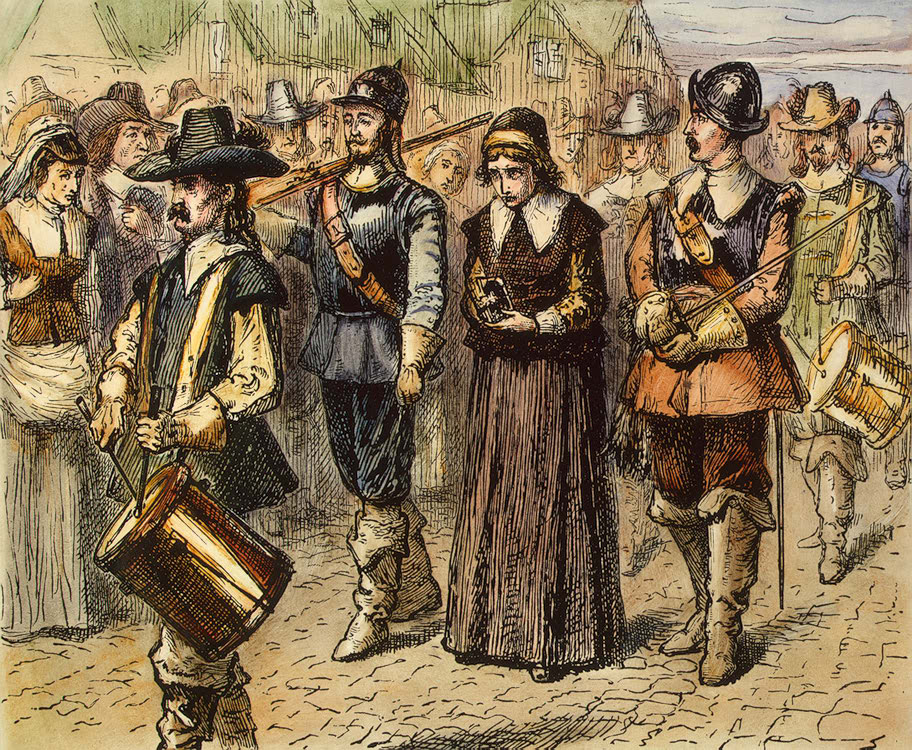
Quaker Mary Dyer was hanged on Boston Common in 1660

One of the first to be executed in the colony was Dorothy Talbye, who was apparently delusional. She was hanged in 1638 for murdering her daughter, as the common law of Massachusetts made no distinction at the time between insanity or mental illness and criminal behavior. Midwife Margaret Jones was convicted of being a witch and hanged in 1648 after the condition of patients allegedly worsened in her care.

The colonial leadership was the most active in New England in the persecution of Quakers. In 1660, English Quaker Mary Dyer was hanged in Boston for repeatedly defying a law banning Quakers from the colony. Dyer was one of the four executed Quakers known as the Boston martyrs. Executions ceased in 1661 when King Charles II explicitly forbade Massachusetts from executing anyone for professing Quakerism.

=== New England Confederation ===
In 1643, Massachusetts Bay joined Plymouth Colony, Connecticut Colony, and New Haven Colony in the New England Confederation, a loose coalition organized primarily to coordinate military and administrative matters among the Puritan colonies. It was most active in the 1670s during King Philip's War. (New Hampshire had not yet been organized as a separate province, and both it and Rhode Island were excluded because they were not Puritan.)

== Economy and trade ==
In the 1600s, the colony was highly dependent on imports from England and was supported by the investments of a number of wealthy immigrants. Certain businesses were quick to thrive, notably shipbuilding, fisheries, and the fur and lumber trades. As early as 1632, when the Blessing of the Bay was completed, ships built in the colony began trading with other colonies, England, and foreign ports in Europe. By 1660, the colony's merchant fleet was estimated at 200 ships and, by the end of the century, its shipyards were estimated to turn out several hundred ships annually. In the early years, the fleet principally carried fish to destinations from the West Indies to Europe. It was common for a merchant to ship dried fish to Portugal or Spain, pick up wine and oil for transport to England, and then carry finished goods from England or elsewhere back to the colony. This and other patterns of trade became illegal following the introduction of the Navigation Acts in 1651, turning colonial merchants who continued these trading patterns into de facto smugglers. Many colonial authorities were merchants or were politically dependent on them, and they opposed being required by the crown to collect duties imposed by those acts. In 1652, Massachusetts General Court authorized John Hull and Robert Sanderson to begin producing coinage for the colony.

The fur trade only played a modest role in the colony's economy because its rivers did not connect its centers well with the Indians who engaged in fur trapping. Timber began to take on an increasingly important role in the economy, especially for naval purposes, after conflicts between England and the Dutch depleted England's supplies of ship masts.

The colony's economy depended on the success of its trade, in part because its land was not as suitable for agriculture as that of other colonies such as Virginia, where large plantations could be established. The fishery was important enough that those involved in it were exempted from taxation and military service. Larger communities supported craftsmen skilled in providing many of the necessities of 17th century life. Some income-producing activities took place in the home, such as carding, spinning, and weaving of wool and other fibers.

Goods were transported to local markets over roads that were sometimes little more than widened Indian trails. Towns were required to maintain their roads, on penalty of fines, and the colony required special town commissions to lay out roads in a more sensible manner in 1639. Bridges were fairly uncommon, since they were expensive to maintain, and fines were imposed on their owners for the loss of life or goods if they failed. Consequently, most river crossings were made by ferry. Notable exceptions were a bridge across the Mystic River constructed in 1638, and another over the Saugus River, whose upkeep costs were subsidized by the colony.

The colonial government attempted to regulate the economy in a number of ways. On several occasions, it passed laws regulating wages and prices of economically important goods and services, but most of these initiatives did not last very long. The trades of shoe-making and coopering (barrel-making) were authorized to form guilds, making it possible to set price, quality, and expertise levels for their work. The colony set standards governing the use of weights and measures. For example, mill operators were required to weigh grain before and after milling, to ensure that the customer received back what he delivered (minus the miller's percentage).

The Puritan dislike of ostentation led the colony to also regulate expenditures on what it perceived as luxury items. Items of personal adornment, particularly lace and costly silk outerwear, were frowned about. Attempts to ban these items failed, and the colony resorted to laws restricting their display to those who could demonstrate £200 in assets.

== Demographics ==
Historical population
Year	Pop.	±%
1630	506	—
1640	8,932	+1665.2%
1650	14,307	+60.2%
1660	20,082	+40.4%
1670	30,000	+49.4%
1680	39,752	+32.5%
1690	49,504	+24.5%
Source: 1630–1690; excluding Province of Maine (1622–1658)

Most of the people who arrived during the first 12 years emigrated from two regions of England. Many of the colonists came from the county of Lincolnshire and East Anglia, northeast of London, and a large group also came from Devon, Somerset, and Dorset in the southwest of England. These areas provided the bulk of the migration, although colonists also came from other regions of England. The pattern of migration often centered around specific Nonconformist clergy who sought to leave England under threat from Archbishop Laud, who encouraged their flock to accompany them. One characteristic unique to the New England colonies (as distinguished from some of the other English colonies) was that most of the immigrants were emigrating for religious and political reasons, rather than economic ones.

The preponderance of the immigrants were well-to-do gentry and skilled craftsmen. They brought with them apprentices and servants, the latter of whom were sometimes in indentured servitude. Few titled nobility emigrated, even though some supported the emigration politically and financially and also acquired land holdings in Massachusetts and other colonies. Merchants also represented a significant proportion of the immigrants, often the children of the gentry, and they played an important role in establishing the economy of the colony.

With the start of the English Civil War in 1642, emigration came to a comparative standstill, and some colonists even returned to England to fight for the Parliamentary cause. In the following years, most of the immigrants came for economic reasons; they were merchants, seamen, and skilled craftsmen. Following the revocation of the Edict of Nantes in 1685, the colony also saw an influx of French Protestant Huguenots. During the period of the charter colony, small numbers of Scots immigrated, but these were assimilated into the colony. The population of Massachusetts remained largely English in character until the 1840s.

Slavery existed but was not widespread within the colony. Some Indians captured in the Pequot War were enslaved, with those posing the greatest threat being transported to the West Indies and exchanged for goods and slaves. Governor John Winthrop owned a few Indian slaves, and Governor Simon Bradstreet owned two black slaves. The Body of Liberties enacted in 1641 included rules governing the treatment and handling of slaves. Bradstreet reported in 1680 that the colony had 100 to 120 slaves, but historian Hugh Thomas documents evidence suggesting that there may have been a somewhat larger number.

== Geography ==
The Massachusetts colony was dominated by its rivers and coastline. Major rivers included the Charles and Merrimack, as well as a portion of the Connecticut River, which has been used to transport furs and timbers to Long Island Sound. Cape Ann juts into the Gulf of Maine, providing harbors for fishermen plying the fishing banks to the east, and Boston's harbor provided secure anchorage for seagoing commercial vessels. Development in Maine was restricted to coastal areas, and large inland areas remained under native control until after King Philip's War, particularly the uplands in what is now Worcester County.

=== Boundaries ===
The colonial charter specified that the boundaries were to be from three miles (4.8 km) north of the Merrimack River to three miles south of the southernmost point of the Charles River and thence westward to the "South Sea" (i.e., the Pacific Ocean). At the time, the course of neither of the rivers was known for any significant length, which eventually led to boundary disputes with the colony's neighbors. The colony's claims were large, but the practicalities of the time meant that they never actually controlled any land further west than the Connecticut River valley. The colony also claimed additional lands by conquest and purchase, further extending the territory that it administered.

The southeastern boundary with the Plymouth Colony was first surveyed in 1639 and accepted by both colonies in 1640. It is known in Massachusetts as the "Old Colony Line", and is still visible as the boundary between Norfolk County to the north and Bristol and Plymouth Counties to the south.

The northern boundary was originally thought to be roughly parallel to the latitude of the mouth of the Merrimack River, since the river was assumed to flow primarily west. This was found not to be the case and, in 1652, Governor Endicott sent a survey party to locate the northernmost point on the Merrimack. At the point where the Pemigewasset River, the Merrimack's principal tributary, meets the Winnipesaukee River local Indians guided the party to the outlet of Lake Winnipesaukee, incorrectly claiming that as the Merrimack's source. The survey party carved lettering into a rock there (now called Endicott Rock), and its latitude was taken to be the colony's northern boundary. When extended eastward, this line was found to meet the Atlantic near Casco Bay in present-day Maine.

Following this discovery, the colonial magistrates began proceedings to bring existing settlements under their authority in southern New Hampshire and Maine. This extension of the colonial claim conflicted with several proprietary grants owned by the heirs of John Mason and Sir Ferdinando Gorges. The Mason heirs pursued their claims in England, and the result was the formation of the Province of New Hampshire in 1679. The current boundary between Massachusetts and New Hampshire was not fixed until 1741. In 1678, the colony purchased the claims of the Gorges heirs, gaining control over the territory between the Piscataqua and Kennebec Rivers. The colony and later the province and state retained control of Maine until it was granted statehood in 1820.

The colony performed a survey in 1642 to determine its southern boundary west to the Connecticut River. This line, south of the present boundary, was protested by Connecticut, but stood until the 1690s, when Connecticut performed its own survey. Most of today's Massachusetts boundaries with its neighbors were fixed in the 18th century. The most significant exception was the eastern boundary with Rhode Island, which required extensive litigation, including Supreme Court rulings, before it was finally resolved in 1862.

Lands which had previously belonged to the Pequots to the southwest were divided after the Pequot War in present-day Rhode Island and eastern Connecticut. Claims were disputed in this area for many years, particularly between Connecticut and Rhode Island. Massachusetts administered Block Island and the area around present-day Stonington, Connecticut, as part of these spoils of war, and was one of several claimants to land in what was known as Narragansett Country (roughly Washington County, Rhode Island). Massachusetts lost these territories in the 1660s, when Connecticut and Rhode Island received their royal charters.

=== Timeline of settlement ===
- Weymouth (Wessagusset): 1622 as part of Plymouth Colony; part of Massachusetts Bay Colony in 1630
- Gloucester: 1623 (Dorchester Company)
- Chelsea: 1624
- Braintree: 1625
- Quincy: 1625
- Naumkeag (later Salem): 1626 (Dorchester Company)
- Beverly: 1626 (originally a part of Salem, incorporated separately in 1668)
- Duxbury, Massachusetts; settled in 1627 as part of Plymouth Colony, incorporated in 1637
- Charlestown: 1628 (first capital, now part of Boston)
- Lynn: 1629
- Saugus: 1629
- Manchester-by-the-Sea (Jeffery's Creek): 1629
- Marblehead: 1629 (settled as a plantation of Salem, incorporated separately in 1639)
- Boston: 1630 (from Shawmut and Trimountaine)
- Medford: 1630
- Mystic (now part of Malden): 1630
- Everett: 1630 (settlement)
- Watertown: 1630 (on land now part of Cambridge)
- Newtowne (now Cambridge): 1630 (near Harvard Square)
- Roxbury: 1630 (now part of Boston)
- Dorchester: 1630 (now part of Boston)
- Newton: 1630
- Marshfield: 1632
- Ipswich: 1633
- Milton: 1634
- Attleboro: 1634
- Agawam: 1635 (Settled as Agawam Plantation and originally administered by the Connecticut Colony; defected to Massachusetts with Springfield in 1640)
- Concord: 1635
- Hingham: 1635
- Newbury: 1635
- Dedham: 1635 (settled as Contentment, renamed Dedham and incorporated in 1636)
- Winthrop: 1635
- Menotomy (now Arlington, then part of Newtowne): 1635
- Scituate: 1636
- Andover: 1636 (split into Andover and North Andover in 1856)
- Springfield: 1636 (settled as Agawam Plantation and originally administered by the Connecticut Colony; defected to Massachusetts and renamed Springfield in 1640)
- Taunton: 1637
- Brookline: 1638 (settled as Muddy River, considered part of Boston until it was renamed Brookline and incorporated in 1705)
- Rowley: 1638
- Salisbury: 1638
- Reading: 1639 (Lynn Village, renamed and incorporated as Reading in 1644)
- Sandwich: 1639 (first settled in 1637)
- Sudbury: 1639
- Winchester: 1640 (founded as part of Charlestown, incorporated as Waterfield in 1640, incorporated 1850)
- Chicopee: 1640 (settled as Nayasett)
- Haverhill: 1640
- Malden: 1640 (founded as part of Charlestown, incorporated separately in 1649)
- Woburn: 1640
- Methuen: 1642 (founded as part of Haverhill, incorporated separately in 1725)
- Longmeadow: 1644
- Andover: 1646 (original settlement is now in North Andover)
- Framingham: 1647
- Natick: 1651
- Eastham: 1651
- Medfield: 1651
- Billerica: 1653 (Founded as Shawshin, incorporated in 1655)
- Chelmsford: 1653 (incorporated in 1655)
- Lancaster: 1653
- Lowell: 1653 (Founded as East Chelmsford, was formally incorporated in 1826)
- Northampton: 1654 (incorporated in 1653)
- Groton: 1655
- Dunstable: 1656
- Hadley: 1659
- Middleton: 1659
- Holliston: 1659
- Marlborough: 1660
- Westfield: 1660
- West Springfield: 1660
- Brookfield: 1660
- Milford: 1662
- Mendon: 1667
- Middleborough: 1669
- Deerfield: 1673
- Worcester: 1673

== Notable people ==
- Anne Hutchinson (1591-1643) religious figure Historian Michael Winship, author of two books about her, has called her "the most famous—or infamous—English woman in colonial American history".
- John Oliver (c. 1616, died 1646), Puritan minister

== Presidential legacy ==
The posterity of the Massachusetts Bay Colony would go on to have an outsized influence on American politics, with thirteen presidents of the United States tracing their patrilineal ancestry back to settlers of the colony. The presidents include John Adams, John Quincy Adams, Millard Fillmore, Franklin Pierce, Abraham Lincoln, Ulysses S. Grant, James A. Garfield, Grover Cleveland, William Howard Taft, Warren G. Harding, Calvin Coolidge, George H. W. Bush, and George W. Bush.

== See also ==
- History of Massachusetts
- History of the Puritans in North America
- List of colonial governors of Massachusetts
- List of members of the colonial Massachusetts House of Representatives
- David Pulsifer – Editor of the Records of the Colony of New Plymouth in New England from 1633 to I679

== Bibliography ==
- Adams, Charles Francis; Nash, Gilbert (1905). Wessagusset and Weymouth. Weymouth, MA: Weymouth Historical Society. OCLC 1066255.
- Adams, Brooks (1899). The Emancipation of Massachusetts.
- Addison, Albert Christopher (1912). The Romantic Story of the Puritan Fathers: And Their Founding of New Boston. L.C. Page & Co.
- Anderson, Robert Charles (1995). The Great Migration Begins: Immigrants to New England, 1620–1633. Boston: New England Historic Genealogical Society. ISBN 978-0-88082-120-9. OCLC 42469253.
- Barnes, Viola Florence (1923). The Dominion of New England: A Study in British Colonial Policy. Yale University Press. ISBN 9780804410656.
- Bowen, Clarence Winthrop (1882). The Boundary Disputes of Connecticut. Boston: James R. Osgood. OCLC 1994357.
- Bremer, Francis (2003). John Winthrop: America's Forgotten Founder. New York: Oxford University Press. ISBN 978-0-19-514913-5. OCLC 237802295.
- Bremer, Francis; Webster, Tom (2006). Puritans and Puritanism in Europe and America: A Comprehensive Encyclopedia. ABC-CLIO. ISBN 978-1-57607-678-1.
- Dow, George Francis (1967) [1935]. Everyday Life in the Massachusetts Bay Colony. New York: Benjamin Blom.
- Field, Edward, ed. (1902). State of Rhode Island and Providence Plantations at the End of the Century: A History. Boston: Mason Publishing. OCLC 14245880.
- Fry, William Henry (1908). New Hampshire as a Royal Province. New York: Columbia University. OCLC 1981065.
- Guiley, Rosemary (2008) [1999]. The Encyclopedia of Witches, Witchcraft, and Wicca. New York: Facts on File. ISBN 9781438126845. OCLC 435912011.
- Hart, Albert Bushnell, ed. (1927). Commonwealth History of Massachusetts. New York: The States History Company. OCLC 1148585635. (Five volume history of Massachusetts until the early 20th century; link is to Vol. I: Colony of Massachusetts Bay)
- Hayes, Kevin (2008). The Oxford Handbook of Early American Literature. Oxford: Oxford University Press. ISBN 9780195187274. OCLC 132584511.
- Heath, Dwight, ed. (1986) [1963]. Mourt's Relation: A Journal of the Pilgrims at Plymouth. Cambridge, MA: Applewood Books. ISBN 9780918222848. OCLC 20838253.
- Hubbard, Bill (2009). American Boundaries: the Nation, the States, the Rectangular Survey. Chicago: University of Chicago Press. ISBN 978-0-226-35591-7. OCLC 163625212.
- Hubbard, William (1848). A General History of New England. Boston: C.C. Little and J. Brown.
- Labaree, Benjamin (1979). Colonial Massachusetts: a History. Millwood, NY: KTO Press. ISBN 978-0-527-18714-9. OCLC 248194957.
- MacDonald, William (1908). Documentary Source Book of American History: 1606–1898. New York: The Macmillan Company. p. 22.
- Main, Gloria (2001). Peoples of a Spacious Land. Cambridge, MA: Harvard University Press. ISBN 978-0674006287.
- Mayo, Lawrence Shaw (1936). John Endecott. Cambridge, MA: Harvard University Press. OCLC 1601746.
- Moore, Jacob Bailey (1851). Lives of the Governors of New Plymouth and Massachusetts Bay. Boston: C. D. Strong. p. 273. OCLC 11362972.
- Morison, Samuel Eliot (1956). The story of the "Old Colony" of New Plymouth, 1620–1692. New York: Knopf. OCLC 174859473.
- Morison, Samuel Eliot (1981) [1930]. Builders of the Bay Colony. Boston: Northeastern University Press. ISBN 978-0-930350-22-2.
  - Morison, Samuel (1917). A History of the Constitution of Massachusetts. Harvard University Library: Wright & Potter Printing Co.
- Nagl, Dominik (2013). No Part of the Mother Country, but Distinct Dominions – Law, State Formation and Governance in England, Massachusetts and South Carolina, 1630–1769. Berlin: LIT. ISBN 978-3-643-11817-2. Archived from the original on August 12, 2016.
- Rogers, Horatio (2009). Mary Dyer of Rhode Island: The Quaker Martyr That Was Hanged on Boston. BiblioBazaar. ISBN 978-1-103-80124-4.
- Starkey, Marion L. (1961) [1949]. The Devil in Massachusetts: A Modern Inquiry into the Salem Witch Trials. Garden City, NY: Dolphin.
- Stratton, Eugene (1986). Plymouth Colony: Its History & People, 1620–1691. Salt Lake City, UT: Ancestry Publications. ISBN 9780916489137. OCLC 15349442.
- Thayer, Henry Otis (1892). The Sagadahoc Colony. Portland: Printed for the Gorges Society.
- Thomas, Hugh (1997). The Slave Trade: The Story of the Atlantic Slave Trade, 1440–1870. New York: Simon and Schuster. ISBN 978-0-684-81063-8. OCLC 36884041.
- Vaughan, Alden T (1995). New England Frontier: Puritans and Indians, 1620–1675. Norman: Oklahoma University Press. ISBN 978-0-8061-2718-7. OCLC 299797876.
- West, Willis (1922). The Story of American Democracy, Political and Industrial. Boston: Allyn and Bacon. p. 104. OCLC 2564556.
- Wheeler, Richard (2009) [1900]. History of the Town of Stonington, Connecticut. Baltimore, MD: Genealogical Publishing Company. OCLC 30055748.
- Winship, Michael Paul (2005). The Times and Trials of Anne Hutchinson: Puritans Divided. Lawrence, Kansas: University Press of Kansas. ISBN 0-7006-1380-3.
- Winthrop, John; Dunn, Richard; Savage, James; Yeandle, Laetitia (1996). The Journal of John Winthrop, 1630–1649. Cambridge, MA: Harvard University Press. ISBN 978-0-674-48425-2. OCLC 185405449.
- "Anne Marbury Hutchinson (1591–1643)". Rhode Island government.

=== Online primary sources ===
- 500+ volumes of colonial records at HathiTrust
- The Charters and General Laws of the Colony and Province of Massachusetts Bay. Boston: Commonwealth of Massachusetts. 1814. OCLC 19448862.
