= Dorchester Company =

- Company type: Joint Stock Company
- Founded: 1623
- Headquarters: England

The Dorchester Company of Adventurers was a Joint Stock Company established in 1623 in England to enable the English colonisation of North America It was based in Dorchester, Dorset, near the English Channel, and was founded at the instigation of the puritan Anglican churchman, John White. The company was a commercial organisation which aimed to provide a safe haven on the North American Coast where supplies could be stored. This was established at Cape Ann.

The Dorchester Company was composed of members of White's congregations in addition to other Puritans that he contacted. They chose to establish a colony at Cape Ann instead of Plymouth because the pilgrims there had a separatist orientation. The company had 119 members. After selecting the destination, the company contracted 14 sailors who were willing to sail and help establish the settlement. The company closed due to a lack of funding.

Although the company only existed for three years it played a significant role in the later development of the Massachusetts Bay Company. White, who was still intent on establishing a colony, was able to transfer Dorchester Company's charter to a new group, the New England Company for a Plantation in Massachusetts Bay or more commonly known as the New England Company. Six of the original members of the Dorchester Company were able to sail and join the Massachusetts Bay Company. The new trading association also included West Country men that had interests in the Dorchester Company such as Thomas Southcott, John Brown, and John Humfrey.
