= Francis Higginson =

Puritan minister in Colonial New England

- Born: 1588; England
- Died: 1630 (aged 41–42); Salem, Massachusetts
- Education: Jesus College, Cambridge
- Occupation: Minister
- Spouse: Anne Herbert
- Children: John Higginson, Francis Higginson

Francis Higginson (1588–1630) was an early Puritan minister in Colonial New England, and the first teacher of the first church in Salem, Massachusetts. He was an ancestor of Thomas Wentworth Higginson.

== Biography ==
=== England ===
The son of a minister, Francis Higginson received his B.A. degree from Jesus College, Cambridge, in 1610 and his M.A. in 1613. About 1615, he became minister at Claybrooke, one of the parishes of Leicester, and acquired great influence as a preacher. Through his acquaintance with Arthur Hildersham and Thomas Hooker, he became disenchanted with the church of England and began to associate himself with Puritan congregations. Religion in England was still going through a very discordant time, especially when King Charles I ascended the throne in 1625 and married a French Catholic Princess. Puritans in England were persecuted for their beliefs and practices with their ministers being forbidden to preach. Higginson left his parish, although he continued to preach occasionally in the pulpits of the church of England. He refused offers of many excellent well paying jobs on account of his opinions, and was supporting himself by preparing young men for the university.

=== Expedition ===
Coat of Arms of Francis Higginson

In 1628, Higginson was invited to join the Massachusetts Bay Company, which he did. In 1629 the Company obtained a Royal Charter from Charles I of England to form a "plantation" in New England. Higginson and his Puritan sympathizers were asked to lead the first expedition to New England's Massachusetts Bay Colony and establish preliminary settlements.

Higginson led a group of about 350 settlers (including many of his own congregation) on six ships from England to New England. Because of the ever-present pirate threat as well as the undeclared war with Spain all ships carried armament. The Lyon's Whelp and the "Talbot" left from Yarmouth, Isle of Wight 11 May 1629 and arrived in Salem harbor 29 June 1629. The Higginson Fleet brought with them 115 head of cattle, as well as horses and mares, cows and oxen, 41 goats, some conies (rabbits), along with all the provisions needed for setting up households and surviving till they could get crops in. They would have to build their lodgings for the coming winter from scratch. These were some of the first settlers of the Massachusetts Bay Colony, the main body who would start coming in 1630 on the Winthrop Fleet. The Higginson Fleet set sail on the 1 May 1629, arriving in Salem harbor on the 24 June 1629, and was greeted by a small group of settlers, led by John Endecott.

The ships in the fleet were:

- Talbot (carried 19 cannon) Capt. Benjamin Gonson/Ganson, whose family had long history with the Royal Navy, Sir Admiral Richard Hawkins and Sir Francis Drake. Long line of descendants.
- George Bonaventure (carried 20 cannon)
- Lyon's Whelp (carried 40 planters + crew + 8 cannon)
- Four Sisters (carried 14 cannon)
- Mayflower (carried 14 guns); a different ship from the Pilgrim's Mayflower
- Pilgrim (small ship with 4 guns that carried supplies only)

=== Salem ===
In Salem there were five houses besides Endecott's. They had no trained minister, however, so Higginson and Samuel Skelton began conducting services immediately. Higginson drew up a confession of faith, which was assented to, on 6 August, by thirty persons. In the following winter, in the general sickness that ravaged the Massachusetts Bay Colony, he was attacked by a fever, which disabled him, and finally caused his death at the age of 43, leaving behind a widow and eight children.

He had married Anne Herbert (who died in 1640 or before) on 8 January 1616 at St Peter's, Nottingham. Their eldest son, John (1616–1708), also trained for the ministry. He succeeded his father-in-law Henry Whitfeld or Whitfield (1597-1687) as minister at Guilford, Connecticut, and served as pastor of Salem from 1659. Another son, Francis Higginson (1618–1673), returned to England and became vicar of Kirkby Stephen, Westmoreland, where he lived until his death.

A portion of his diary was published in 1630 under the title, New Englands Plantation, or a Short and True Description of the Commodities and Discommodities of that Country. He also wrote an account of his voyage, which is preserved in Hutchinson's collection of papers.
