= List of coastal fortifications of the United States =

The United States and the colonies that preceded it built numerous coastal defenses to defend major cities, ports and straits from the colonial era through World War II. Some listed were built by other nations and are now on United States territory.

== United States fortification programs ==
=== Colonial period through 1885 ===
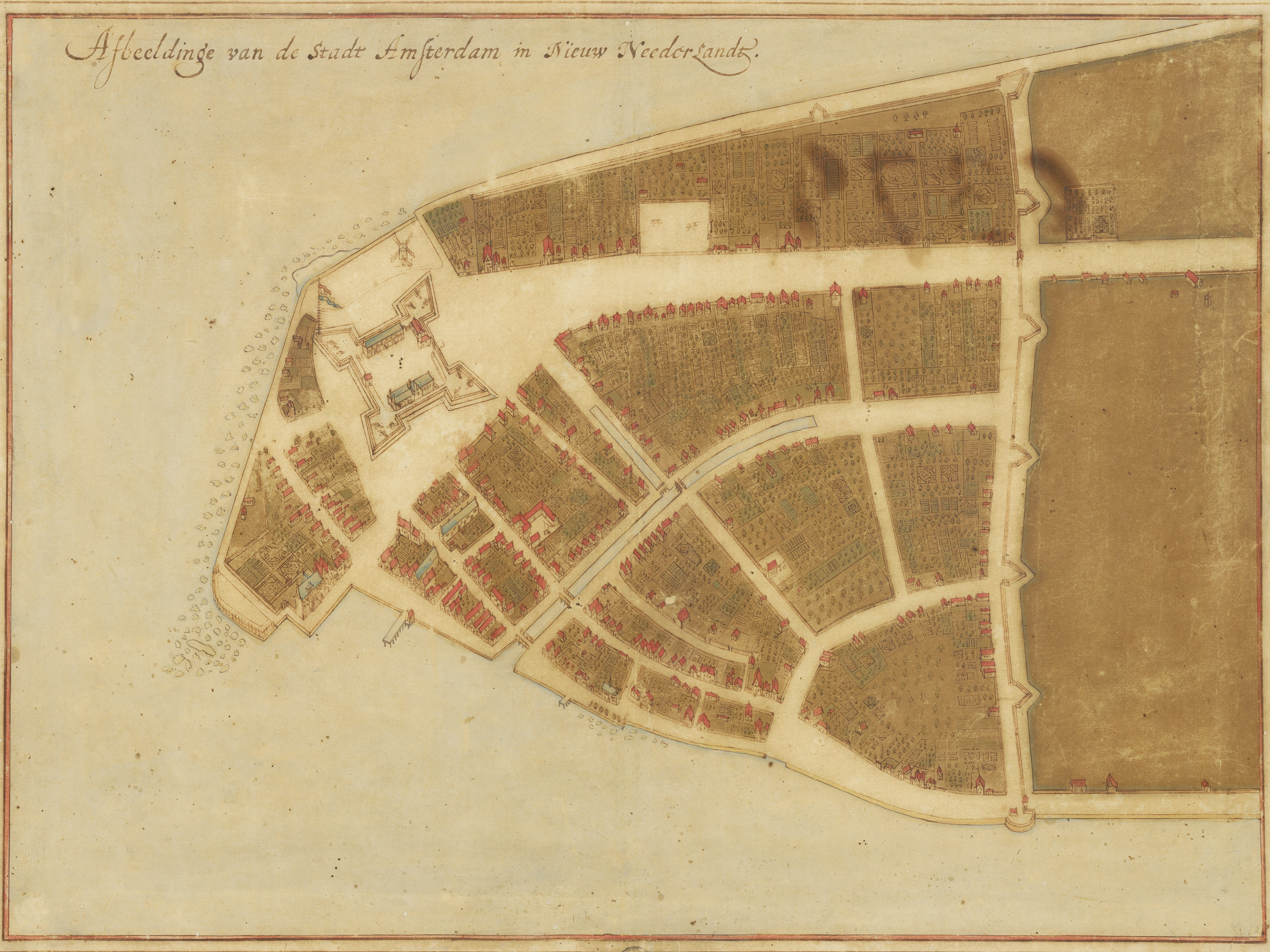
Fort Amsterdam, the quadrangular structure (left) in this 1660 image stood at the southern tip of Manhattan Island, defending New Amsterdam

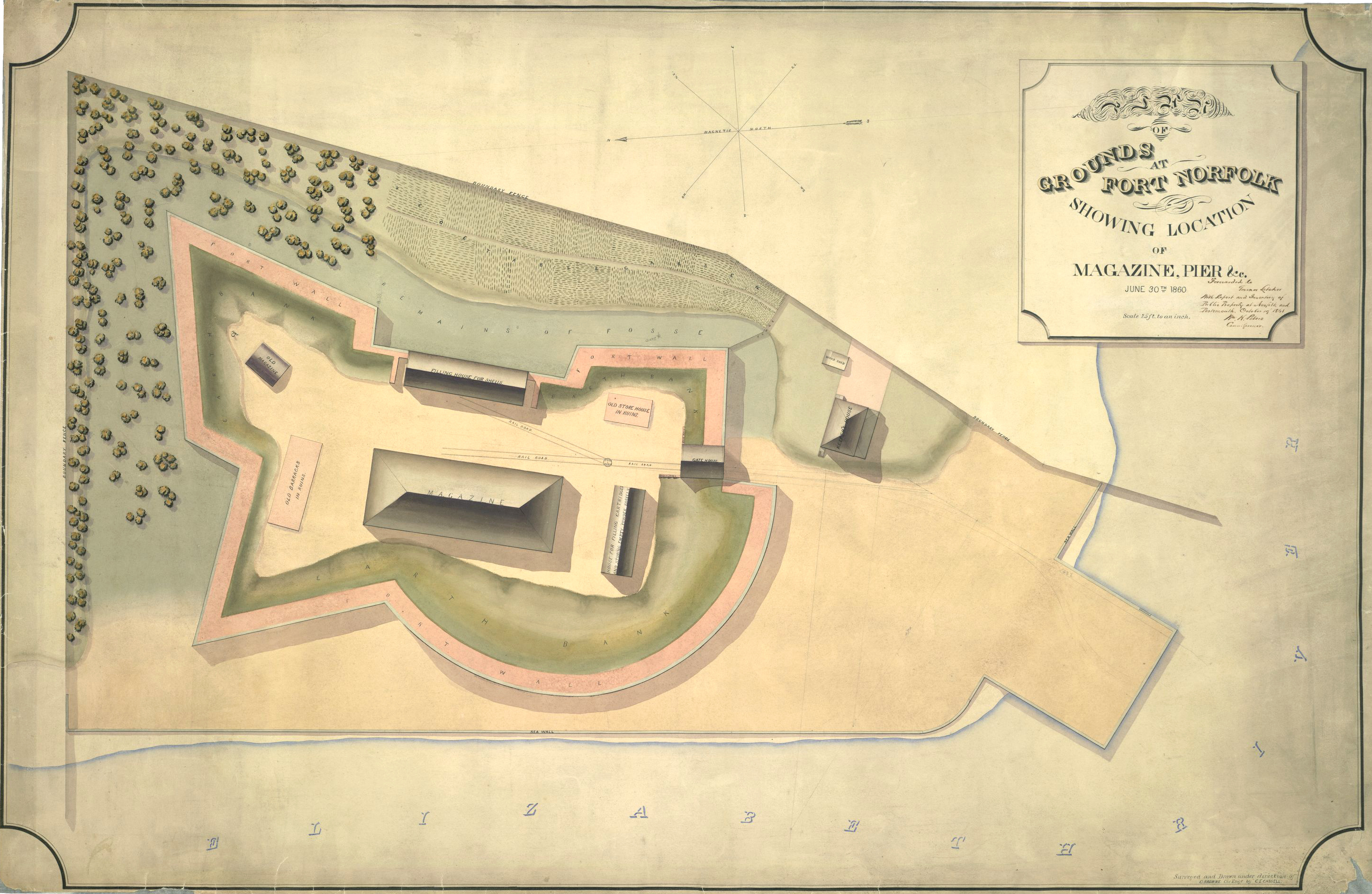
Fort Norfolk in 1861, a first system fort upgraded as part of the second system

The Statue of Liberty is built on top of Fort Wood of the second system

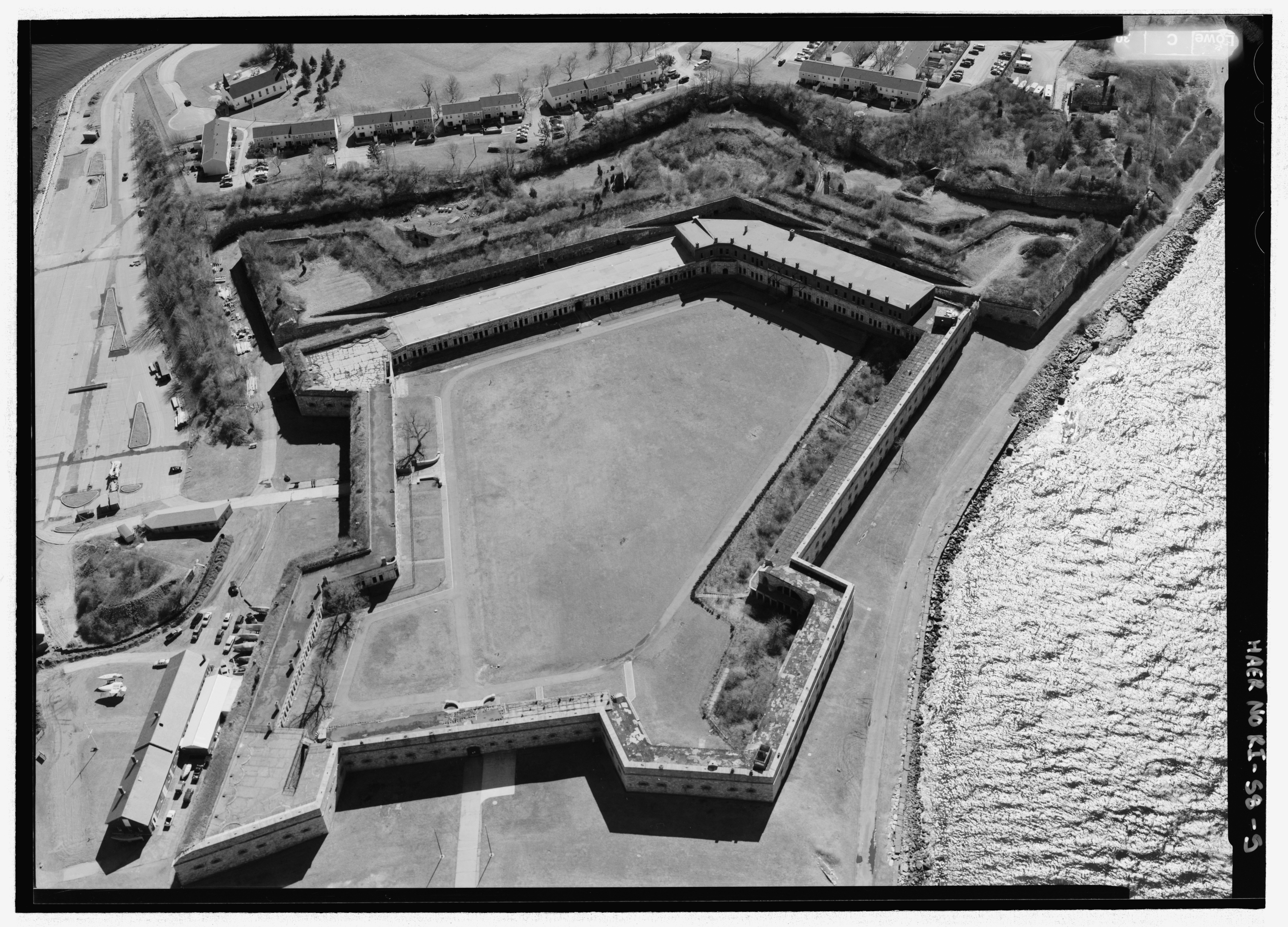
Fort Adams, one of the largest third system forts

In the American colonies and the United States, coastal forts were generally more heavily constructed than inland forts, and mounted heavier weapons comparable to those on potential attacking ships. Coastal forts built from 1794 through 1867 were generally grouped into three time periods by later historians; these were marked by significant federal fortification programs with most forts built in a particular style. Forts of the first and second systems were generally earthwork star forts with some masonry reinforcement, mounting one tier of cannon, usually on the roof of the fort or behind low earthworks. Along with new forts, a few masonry forts of the colonial period were rebuilt under the first system, which was built from 1794 through 1801. The second system began construction in 1802, due to tensions with Britain and France that ultimately led to the War of 1812. Forts of the first two systems were usually completed in two to five years, due to their simple designs. The third system, developed after Washington, D.C. was captured and burned in the War of 1812 with its second system fort bypassed, had much larger forts than the previous systems. These were built primarily of masonry, typically with two or three tiers of cannon; two forts were completed with four tiers. All but the top tier of guns were in casemates protected by masonry. These were the largest masonry forts built by the United States, with many designed by US Army engineer Joseph G. Totten assisted by French military engineer Simon Bernard. All forts built by the federal government were designed and constructed by the US Army Corps of Engineers; however, some forts were built entirely with state or local resources. Until 1901 federal forts were garrisoned by various artillery units; following the Civil War most units at the forts were designated as heavy artillery batteries. Although designs varied, most were bastioned polygonal forts, having a large seacoast armament with musketry loopholes and howitzer positions to defend against land attacks. Work on the third system forts began in 1819. These forts took decades to build, and many were incomplete when funding was cut off in 1867, especially those begun during the American Civil War. Several forts had their designs modified during the Civil War for faster completion, but this did not always result in a functional fort by 1867. Earthworks built during the war are not included in this list. The siege of Fort Pulaski in April 1862 showed that masonry forts were vulnerable to modern rifled cannon, though the Union did not act on this until after the war. In 1867 funding for masonry forts was cut off, and work began on new batteries with earth protection, reinforced with masonry and often near previous forts. However, in 1876 funding was cut off again, with most of these batteries unfinished.

=== Endicott program through World War I ===
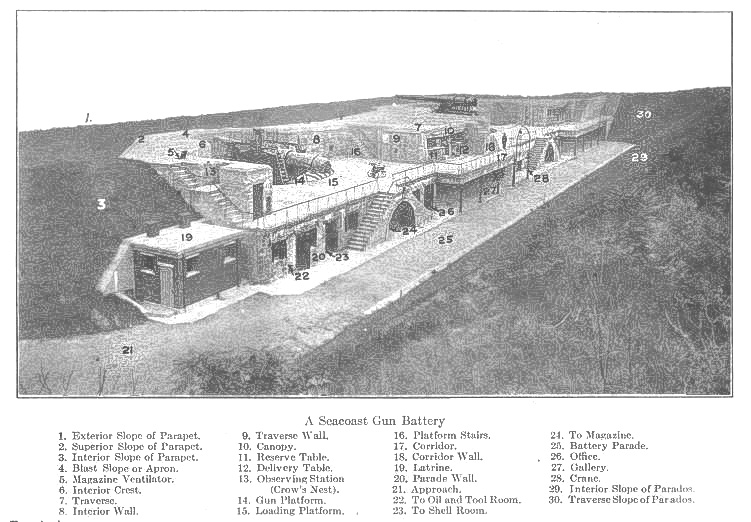
Endicott Program battery with two guns on disappearing carriages

In 1885 the Board of Fortifications, chaired by Secretary of War William C. Endicott, met to lay the groundwork for a new coast defense system. New defenses were recommended for 27 harbors and river estuaries; most of the board's recommendations were implemented in what was often called the Endicott Program. This included new rifled guns ranging from 3-inch (76 mm) to 12-inch (305 mm), most of them to be on disappearing carriages in new reinforced concrete emplacements faced with earth. The combination of earth-faced emplacements and disappearing carriages was intended to conceal the guns from an enemy; the airplane had not been invented yet. 12-inch (305 mm) rifled mortars and controlled minefields were also part of the program. A number of Endicott batteries were built near (and sometimes in) previous forts. Since everything had to be designed and built from the ground up, progress was slow until the Spanish–American War of 1898 potentially threatened the U.S. east coast with bombardment by the Spanish fleet. Only a few new batteries were complete by then, and emergency batteries were hastily built and armed with Civil War-era weapons, along with some new 8-inch (203 mm) guns intended for Endicott batteries but mounted on old-style carriages, plus some smaller rapid-fire guns purchased from the United Kingdom. In 1901 the artillery batteries were redesignated, with the light batteries becoming numbered artillery batteries and the heavy batteries at the forts becoming coast artillery companies, all still part of the Artillery Corps. In 1907 the coast artillery companies were split off as the United States Army Coast Artillery Corps, with the light batteries becoming the Field Artillery. The Endicott forts were fully funded during and after the Spanish–American War, and were substantially complete by 1906. In 1905 the Taft Board met to decide on further improvements. The United States had acquired Hawaii and the Philippines in 1898, along with the Panama Canal Zone in 1903. The Taft Board made fire control improvements at several harbor defenses, and decided on new defenses in the three new territories as well as Los Angeles, California. Since the Japanese were building capital ships armed with 14-inch (356 mm) guns, new weapons of this caliber were developed and emplaced in the four new defenses, though not at any existing defenses. In 1917, with World War I in progress and all major powers in possession of dreadnought battleships, the Army decided on a new type of battery. This would have two 12-inch (305 mm) guns in open emplacements on high-angle (35° elevation) barbette carriages to increase their range. Existing 12-inch guns were used for these batteries, eleven of which were in the continental United States (in most cases at existing forts), with two in Panama, one in Hawaii, and two one-gun batteries in the Philippines. The initial lack of protection from air attack was a significant problem with these batteries; their only concealment was camouflage and being set back from the coast, although their magazines were in bunkers. Most of these batteries were completed circa 1920.

=== Between the wars ===
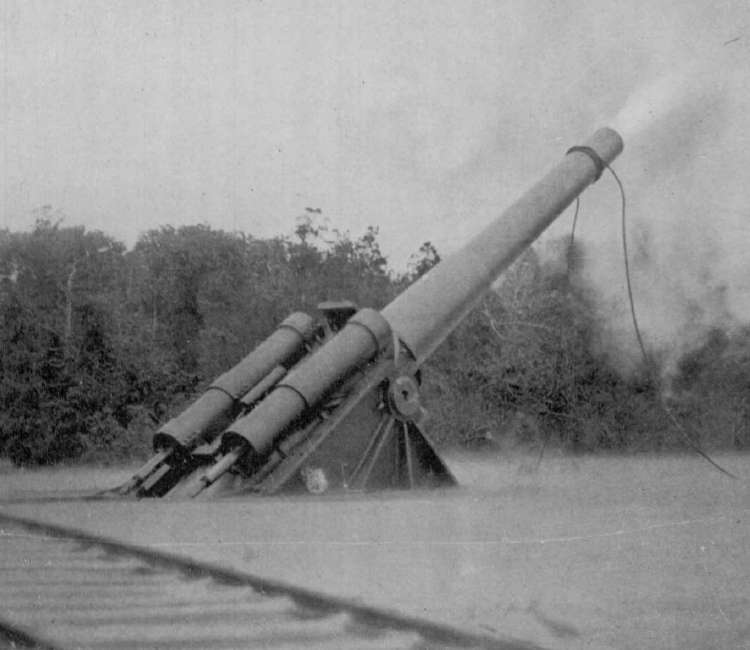
12-inch gun on long-range barbette carriage

Following World War I, the Army attempted further improvements, but in the peacetime funding climate little could be done. A new 16-inch (406 mm) gun was adopted, on a new barbette carriage with 65° elevation to allow plunging fire. However, with funding limited only eleven weapons of this caliber could be deployed by 1927; one on a disappearing carriage, four 16-inch howitzers, and the remainder in batteries similar to the 12-inch weapons, all at new forts except the disappearing weapon. The ports protected by these included Boston, New York City, the entrance to the Chesapeake Bay near Norfolk, Virginia, and Pearl Harbor, Hawaii. The Navy provided twenty 16-inch guns intended for cancelled battleships in the 1920s; six of these were deployed in Hawaii and Panama by 1935.

=== World War II ===
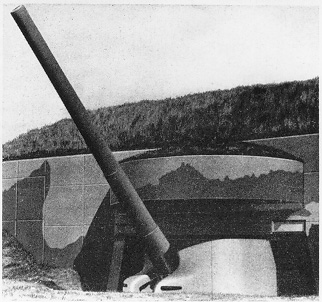
16-inch casemated gun, typical World War II installation

In 1938 construction began on two casemated batteries for 16-inch (406 mm) guns near San Francisco; the casemates protected the guns against air attack. After the Fall of France in 1940, the Army's Harbor Defense Board met to consider the future of coast defenses. The board decided to replace the turn-of-the-century defenses with new casemated 16-inch gun batteries with two guns each, typically one or two batteries per harbor defense command; most previous 16-inch batteries were also to be casemated. Due to their range advantage over previous weapons, most 16-inch batteries were at new forts, usually called "military reservations" to conceal their purpose. The long-range 12-inch batteries were retained and casemated, with a few built new. Due to circumstances requiring development of a new 16-inch gun for new battleships, the Navy released about 50 additional 1920s 16-inch guns. The 16-inch batteries would be complemented by 6-inch (152 mm) guns on new high-angle shielded barbette mounts with magazine bunkers, and new 90 mm (3.5-inch) dual-purpose gun batteries. Due to the diminishing threat of enemy surface attack as World War II progressed, especially on the east coast, of 38 16-inch batteries proposed only 21 were completed, and not all of these were armed. As the 16-inch batteries were completed the older heavy weapons at the harbor defense commands were scrapped, though some 6-inch and 3-inch guns were retained. Following World War II essentially all remaining gun defenses were scrapped by 1948.

== List fields ==
- State: The state in which the fort is located.
- Name: The fort name, including prior names or names of prior forts on the site.
- Location: The town, island, or other place name the fort itself is or was located at.
- City or area defended: The port city, river estuary or delta, or other general area the fort defended. For 1895 and later forts, this is the name of the Coast Defense Command (Harbor Defense Command after 1925) the fort was part of. "The" preceding a place name means the area defended is a river estuary or delta.
- Era(s): Periods in which major defensive or armament-related construction took place at the fort.
  - Colonial: Prior to 1775, or built by a country other than the US.
  - Revolutionary War: 1775–1793.
  - First System: 1794–1801.
  - Second System: 1802–1815.
  - War of 1812: 1812–1815.
  - Third System: 1816–1860.
  - Civil War: 1861–1867.
  - 1870s: 1868–1879.
  - Endicott: 1885–1904.
  - Taft: 1905–1916.
  - World War I: 1917–1918.
  - Interwar: 1919–1939.
  - World War II: 1940–1945.
- Activated: Year in which the first coastal fort on the site entered service, usually when completed or first garrisoned. Many forts were garrisoned but never completed.
- Deactivated as coastal fort: Year the fort was disarmed (periods of caretaker status are not noted).
- Deactivated as military post: Year the fort site was abandoned by the Armed Forces.

For new construction in World War II, locations with 6-inch guns are included only where they were the primary defenses in the area. All forts with completed 16-inch batteries are listed, but some were never armed. There were numerous other locations not listed with 155 mm, 6-inch, or 90 mm guns, some of which were called "Forts" while others were called "Military Reservations".

== List of US coastal fortifications ==
State	Name	Location	City or area defended	Era(s)	Activated	Deactivated as coastal fort	Deactivated as military post	Notes
Alabama	Fort Charlotte/Fort Conde	Mobile	Mobile	Colonial	1723	1820	1820	4/5 scale replica on site
Alabama	Fort Gaines	Dauphin Island	Mobile	Third System, Endicott	1821	1928	1947	
Alabama	Fort Morgan/Fort Bowyer	Mobile Point	Mobile	Second System, Third System, Endicott	1814	1928	1947	Rearmed with Panama mounts in WWII
Alaska	Fort Schwatka	Dutch Harbor	Dutch Harbor	World War II	1944	1950		
Alaska	Fort Learnard	Eider Point, Unalaska	Dutch Harbor	World War II	1944	1950		
Alaska	Fort J. H. Smith	Chiniak	Kodiak	World War II	1944	1950		
Alaska	Fort Abercrombie	Miller Point, Kodiak Island	Kodiak	World War II	1944	1950		
Alaska	Fort Tidball	Castle Bluffs, Long Island	Kodiak	World War II	1944	1950		
Alaska	Fort McGilvray	Caines Head	Seward	World War II	1943	1944		6" battery not completed
Alaska	Fort Bulkley	Rugged Island	Seward	World War II				6" battery not completed
Alaska	Fort Rousseau	Makhnati Island	Sitka	World War II	1944	1950		
Alaska	Fort Babcock	Shoals Point, Kruzof Island	Sitka	World War II	1944	1950		6" battery not completed
Alaska	Fort Peirce	Biorka Island	Sitka	World War II				6" battery not completed
California	Fort Rosecrans/Fort Guijarros	San Diego	San Diego	Colonial, Endicott, Taft, World War II	1797	1950		Part of fort is now Naval Base Point Loma, part is Cabrillo National Monument
California	Fort Emory	San Diego	San Diego	World War II	1943	1946		Fort site is on Naval Amphibious Base Coronado, batteries demolished
California	Fort MacArthur	San Pedro	Los Angeles	Taft, Interwar, World War II	1917	1948		Museum on site
California	White Point Military Reservation	San Pedro	Los Angeles	World War II	1943	1948		Adjacent to Fort MacArthur, World War II 16-inch battery on site
California	Bolsa Chica Military Reservation	Huntington Beach	Los Angeles	World War II	1942	1948		16-inch battery demolished
California	Presidio of San Francisco/Fort Winfield Scott	San Francisco	San Francisco	Colonial, Endicott	1776	1945	1994	Extensively re-used by various exhibits, organizations, and businesses
California	Fort Point/Fort Winfield Scott/Castillo de San Joaquin	San Francisco	San Francisco	Colonial, Third System	1794	1900	1970	National park
California	Fort Alcatraz	Alcatraz Island	San Francisco	Third System, 1870s	1858	1876	1934	National park, fort mostly buried by prison construction, a few casemates remain
California	Fort McDowell	Angel Island	San Francisco	Endicott	1901	1915	1962	State park
California	Fort Mason	San Francisco	San Francisco	Civil War, Endicott	1864	1910	1972	Part of Golden Gate National Recreation Area
California	Fort Baker/Lime Point Mil Res	Marin Headlands	San Francisco	1870s, Endicott	1876	1946	2000	Part of Golden Gate National Recreation Area
California	Fort Barry	Marin Headlands	San Francisco	Endicott, Taft, Interwar, World War II	1905	1948	1974	Part of Golden Gate National Recreation Area
California	Fort Cronkhite	Marin Headlands	San Francisco	Interwar	1940	1948	1974	16-inch gun at Battery Townsley, part of Golden Gate National Recreation Area
California	Fort Funston/Lake Merced Mil Res	Lake Merced	San Francisco	Interwar	1939	1948	1963	Part of Golden Gate National Recreation Area
California	Fort Miley	Point Lobos, San Francisco	San Francisco	Endicott, World War II	1898	1949	1949	Part of Golden Gate National Recreation Area
Connecticut	Fort Griswold	Groton	New London	Revolutionary War, Third System	1778	1903	1903	Restored, open to public, state park
Connecticut	Fort Trumbull	New London	New London	Revolutionary War, Second System, Third System	1777	1900?	1996	Preserved, open to public, state park
Connecticut	Fort Nathan Hale/Black Rock Fort	New Haven	New Haven	Colonial, Revolutionary War, Second System, Civil War	1657	1866	1890	State park, forts on site are mostly reconstructions
Connecticut	Fort Black Rock/Fort Union	Black Rock	Fairfield	Revolutionary War, War of 1812, Spanish–American War	1776	1899	1899	Site now in Bridgeport, replaced by Fort Union in 1813
Connecticut	Fort Saybrook/Fort Fenwick	Old Saybrook	Old Saybrook	Colonial, Revolutionary War, War of 1812	1635	1815	1815	Park on site, no remains
Connecticut	Long Point Fort	Stonington Borough	Stonington	Revolutionary War, War of 1812, Spanish–American War	1775	1899	1899	Withstood a War of 1812 bombardment, two cannons remain in the town
Connecticut	Fort Stamford	Stamford	Stamford	Revolutionary War	1781	1783	1783	Site is preserved
Delaware	Fort Delaware	Pea Patch Island	The Delaware	Third System, Endicott	1824	1942	1944	First masonry fort completed 1824, demolished after a fire in 1831, state park
Delaware	Fort DuPont/Ten Gun Battery/Fort Reynolds	Delaware City	The Delaware	Civil War, Endicott	1864	1942	1945	State park, National Guard armory
Delaware	Fort Saulsbury	Slaughter Beach	The Delaware	Interwar	1924	1946	1948	Privately owned, two 12-inch long range batteries, never casemated
Delaware	Fort Miles	Cape Henlopen	The Delaware	World War II	1943	1948	1996	State park, batteries well-preserved
District of Columbia				Second System, Third System, Civil War, 1870s, Endicott				See Fort Washington and Fort Foote, Maryland; Battery Rodgers and Fort Hunt, Virginia
Florida	Fort Clinch	Amelia Island	The St. Marys	Third System	1861	1900	1935	State park
Florida	Castillo de San Marcos/Fort Marion	St. Augustine	St. Augustine	Colonial, Third System	1672	1866	1933	National park
Florida	Fort Matanzas	St. Augustine	St. Augustine	Colonial	1742	1822	1933	National Monument
Florida	Fort Taylor	Key West	Key West	Third System, Endicott	1860	1946	1974	State park
Florida	Fort Jefferson	Dry Tortugas	Florida Keys	Third System	1861	1888	1888	National park
Florida	Fort Brooke	Tampa	Tampa	Wooden fort	1824	1883	1883	Tampa Bay History Center now on site
Florida	Fort Dade	Egmont Key	Tampa Bay	Endicott	1899	1926	1946	State park
Florida	Fort De Soto	Mullet Key	Tampa Bay	Endicott	1902	1921	1944	State park, rearmed with Panama mounts in WWII, guns and mortars on site
Florida	Fort Barrancas	Pensacola	Pensacola	Colonial, Third System	1787	1900?	1971	National park, now on Naval Air Station Pensacola, Advanced Redoubt nearby
Florida	Fort George/Fort St. Michael	Pensacola	Pensacola	Colonial	1772	1814	1814?	Partial reconstruction on site
Florida	Fort Pickens	Santa Rosa Island	Pensacola	Third System, Endicott, Interwar	1834	1947	1947	Part of Gulf Islands National Seashore
Florida	Fort McRee	Perdido Key	Pensacola	Third System, Endicott	1839	1920	1947	
Georgia	Fort Pulaski	Cockspur Island	Savannah	Third System, 1870s	1847	1900?	1924	National Monument
Georgia	Fort Screven	Tybee Island	Savannah	Endicott	1899	1920	1944	rearmed with Panama mounts in WWII, museum on site
Georgia	Fort James Jackson/Fort Oglethorpe	Savannah	Savannah	Second System, Third System	1812	1905	1905	National Historic Landmark
Georgia	Fort McAllister Historic State Park/Fort McAllister	Richmond Hill	Savannah	Civil War	1861	1865?	1865?	Confederate-built, state park
Georgia	Fort Greene	Cockspur Island	Savannah	First System	1796	1804	1804	Destroyed by hurricane 1804
Georgia	Fort at Point Petre/Fort Point Peter	St. Marys	The St. Marys	First System	1800	1815	1870	Burned by British 1815
Hawaii	Fort Elizabeth	Waimea	Kauai	Colonial	1817	1853	1853	Russian-built, occupied by the Kingdom of Hawaii within a year, now state park
Hawaii	Fort Ruger	Diamond Head	Honolulu	Taft, Interwar, World War II	1910	1946	1974	Part of Diamond Head State Monument
Hawaii	Fort Armstrong	Honolulu	Honolulu	Taft, Interwar, World War II	1911	1949	1974	
Hawaii	Fort DeRussy	Waikiki	Honolulu	Taft	1913	1946		Military rec center, museum on site
Hawaii	Fort Barrette	Kapolei	Pearl Harbor	Interwar	1937	1948		
Hawaii	Fort Weaver	Puuloa	Pearl Harbor	Interwar	1924	1948	1948	
Hawaii	Fort Kamehameha	Queen Emma Point	Pearl Harbor	Taft, Interwar	1913	1949		Now part of Hickam AFB
Hawaii	Battery Arizona	Kahe Point	Pearl Harbor	World War II	1945	1946	1948	Site of a gun turret from USS Arizona (BB-39)
Hawaii	Fort Hase	Mokapu Point	Kaneohe Bay	World War II	1942	1948		Now part of Marine Corps Base Hawaii, includes site of a gun turret from USS Arizona (BB-39)
Louisiana	Fort Jackson	Triumph	The Mississippi	Third System, Endicott	1832	1920	1922	Parish park
Louisiana	Fort St. Philip/Fort San Felipe	Triumph	The Mississippi	Colonial, Second System, Endicott	1795	1920	1922	Privately held
Louisiana	Fort Livingston	Grand Terre Island	The Mississippi	Third System	1861	1889	1889	Ruined
Louisiana	Fort Pike	New Orleans	New Orleans	Third System	1827	1884	1890	State historic site
Louisiana	Fort Macomb/Fort Wood	Chef Menteur Pass	New Orleans	Third System	1827	1867	1871	State historic site
Maine	Fort Sullivan	Eastport	Eastport	Second System	1809	1873	1877	National historic site
Maine	Fort O'Brien/Fort Machias	Machiasport	Machiasport	Revolutionary War, Second System, Civil War	1775	1865	1865	State park
Maine	Fort George	Castine	Castine	Colonial (Revolutionary War, War of 1812)	1779	1819	1819	State park, British-built in both wars
Maine	Fort Edgecomb	Edgecomb	Wiscasset	Second System	1809	1816	1865	State historic site
Maine	Fort Knox	Prospect	The Penobscot	Third System	1863	1916	1923	State park
Maine	Fort Pownall	Stockton Springs	The Penobscot	Colonial, Revolutionary War	1759	1776	1776	State park, foundations remain
Maine	Fort Popham	Phippsburg	The Kennebec	Third System, Endicott	1863	1904	1924	State park, used to support Fort Baldwin in WWII
Maine	Fort Baldwin	Phippsburg	The Kennebec	Taft	1908	1924	1945	State park, rearmed with Panama mounts in WWII
Maine	Fort Allen	Portland	Portland	Revolutionary War, War of 1812	1775	1815	1821	City park, a few earthworks remain
Maine	Fort Sumner	Portland	Portland	First System	1794	1815	1821	City park, nothing remains
Maine	Fort Preble	South Portland	Portland	Second System, Third System, Civil War, 1870s, Endicott	1808	1946	1950	Now Southern Maine Community College
Maine	Fort Scammel	House Island	Portland	Second System, Third System, 1870s	1808	1902	1919?	Private island
Maine	Fort Gorges	Hog Island Ledge	Portland	Third System	1865	1898	1959	10-inch Parrott rifle on roof of fort
Maine	Fort Williams	Cape Elizabeth	Portland	Endicott	1898	1946	1962	Town park, most batteries buried
Maine	Fort Levett	Cushing Island	Portland	Endicott, Interwar	1903	1948	1950?	Private island
Maine	Fort McKinley	Great Diamond Island	Portland	Endicott	1901	1947	1950?	
Maine	Fort Lyon	Cow Island	Portland	Taft	1907	1946	1950?	
Maine	Peaks Island Military Reservation	Peaks Island	Portland	World War II	1945	1948	1950?	16-inch Battery Steele is a national historic site
Maine	Fort McClary/Fort William	Kittery	Portsmouth	Colonial, Second System, Third System	1689	1904	1918	State historic site
Maine	Fort Foster	Kittery	Portsmouth	Endicott	1901	1946	1948	Town park
Maine	Fort Sullivan	Kittery	Portsmouth	Revolutionary War, Civil War	1775	1865		No remains, site was near Portsmouth Naval Prison
Maryland	Fort McHenry/Fort Whetstone	Whetstone Point, Baltimore	Baltimore	Revolutionary War, First System, 1870s	1800	1912	1925	National park, attack on fort in the War of 1812 inspired "The Star-Spangled Banner", great cannon collection
Maryland	Fort Carroll	Soller's Point Flats, Patapsco River	Baltimore	Third System, Endicott	1847	1920	1923	On an island near the Key Bridge
Maryland	Fort Howard	North Point/Fort Howard	Baltimore	Endicott	1899	1927	1971	Park, Veterans Administration hospital
Maryland	Fort Armistead	Hawkins Point	Baltimore	Endicott	1900	1920	1947	City park
Maryland	Fort Smallwood	Riviera Beach	Baltimore	Endicott	1900	1927	1928	County park
Maryland	Fort Madison	United States Naval Academy	Annapolis	Second System	1808	1873		Demolished 1909
Maryland	Fort Severn	United States Naval Academy	Annapolis	Second System	1808	1865		Demolished 1909
Maryland	Fort Washington/Fort Warburton	Fort Washington	The Potomac	Second System, Third System, 1870s, Endicott	1809	1929	1946	National park, Second System fort destroyed in War of 1812
Maryland	Fort Foote	Fort Washington	The Potomac	Civil War	1863	1902	1946	National park
Massachusetts	Fort at Salisbury Point	Salisbury Beach, Salisbury	The Merrimack	Civil War	1863	1865	1865	No remains due to beach erosion
Massachusetts	Fort Philip	Plum Island, Newburyport	The Merrimack	Revolutionary War, Second System	1776	1815	1815	No remains due to beach erosion
Massachusetts	Eastern Point Fort	Eastern Point, Gloucester	Gloucester	Civil War	1863	1867	1867	Part of fort remains
Massachusetts	Fort Defiance/Fort at Gloucester/Fort Lillie/Fort Anne	Fort Point, Gloucester	Gloucester	Colonial, First System, Second System	1703	1865	1920?	Burned in 1833 and rebuilt 1851, but probably not to Third System standards; nothing remains
Massachusetts	Stage Fort/Fort Gloucester/Fort Conant/others	Stage Fort Park, Gloucester	Gloucester	Colonial, Revolutionary War, Civil War	1635	1865	1898	Reconstructed, city park
Massachusetts	Fort Pickering/Salem Barracks/Fort Anne/Fort William	Winter Island	Salem	Colonial, First System, Second System, Civil War	1655	1900	1971	Part of Winter Island Marine Park
Massachusetts	Fort Miller/Fort Darby/Darby's Fort	Naugus Head, Marblehead	Marblehead	Colonial, Revolutionary War, Second System, Civil War, Spanish–American War	1632	1900?	1900?	Demolished
Massachusetts	Fort Sewall/Gale's Head Fort	Gale's Head, Marblehead	Marblehead	Colonial, Revolutionary War, First System, Second System, Civil War	1634	1892	1922	City park
Massachusetts	Fort Independence/Castle William/Fort Adams	Castle Island	Boston	Colonial, Revolutionary War, First System, Third System	1634	1908	1946	National Historic Site
Massachusetts	Fort Warren	Georges Island	Boston	Third System, Endicott	1861	1945	1958	Part of Boston Harbor Islands National Recreation Area
Massachusetts	Fort Winthrop/Fort Warren	Governors Island	Boston	Second System, Third System, 1870s	1808	1905	1905?	Island now part of Logan Airport, renamed Fort Winthrop 1833, magazine explosion 1902, demolished 1941
Massachusetts	Fort Banks	Winthrop	Boston	Endicott	1896	1943	1947	Partially re-used
Massachusetts	Fort Heath	Grovers Cliff	Boston	Endicott	1901	1946	1969	Batteries demolished, town park
Massachusetts	Fort Standish	Lovells Island	Boston	Endicott	1904	1947	1947	Part of Boston Harbor Islands National Recreation Area
Massachusetts	Fort Strong	Long Island	Boston	Endicott	1899	1947	1961	Bridge demolished
Massachusetts	Fort Andrews	Peddocks Island	Boston	Endicott	1904	1947	1957	City park
Massachusetts	Fort Revere/Fort Independence	Hull	Boston	Revolutionary War, Endicott	1776	1946	1950?	Probably inactive 1782–1901, regional park
Massachusetts	Fort Duvall	Spinnaker Island/Hog Island	Boston	Interwar	1927	1948	1974	Built on, gated island community
Massachusetts	East Point Military Reservation	Nahant	Boston	World War II	1943	1948	1962	Part of Northeastern University
Massachusetts	Fort Ruckman	Nahant	Boston	Interwar	1924	1946	1962	Partly buried, town park
Massachusetts	Fort Dawes	Deer Island	Boston	World War II	1944	1948	1963	Not armed, demolished for wastewater plant
Massachusetts	Fort Andrew/Gurnet Fort	Gurnet Point, Plymouth	Plymouth	Revolutionary War, Second System, Civil War	1776	1869	1926	Earthworks remain, Plymouth Light on site, private property
Massachusetts	Fort Standish	Saquish Head, Plymouth	Plymouth	Civil War	1863	1870	1925	Earthworks remain, private property
Massachusetts	Fort Rodman/Fort at Clark's Point	New Bedford	New Bedford	Third System, Endicott	1863	1946	1975?	Town park
Massachusetts	Fort Taber	New Bedford	New Bedford	Civil War	1861	1863	1865	Built and garrisoned with city resources near Fort Rodman and named after mayor, town park
Massachusetts	Fort Phoenix/Fort Fearing	Fairhaven	New Bedford	Revolutionary War, First System, Second System	1775	1866?	1922	Built and rebuilt with state resources, state park
Massachusetts	Acushnet Fort	Eldridge Point, New Bedford	New Bedford	Revolutionary War, Second System	1776	1815?	1820?	Location uncertain, possibly at later Fort Taber/Fort Rodman
Mississippi	Fort Massachusetts/Fort on Ship Island/Fort Twiggs	West Ship Island	Gulfport	Third System, Civil War	1861	1903		Part of Gulf Islands National Seashore
New Hampshire	Fort Constitution/Fort Castle/Fort William and Mary	New Castle Island	Portsmouth	Colonial, First System, Second System, Civil War, Endicott	1631	1942		Coast Guard station and state park
New Hampshire	Fort Stark/Battery Cumberland	Jerry's Point/Jaffrey's Point, New Castle Island	Portsmouth	Colonial, Revolutionary War, First System, 1870s, Endicott	1746	1945	1983	State historic site, unique HECP remains
New Hampshire	Fort Washington	Peirce's Island, Portsmouth	Portsmouth	Revolutionary War	1775	1815	1815	Some earthworks remain near water treatment plant
New Hampshire	Fort Dearborn	Rye	Portsmouth	World War II	1942	1948	1959	State park
New Jersey	Fort Hancock/Fort on Sandy Hook	Sandy Hook	Southern New York	Third System, Endicott, Taft, Interwar	1865	1948	1974	Third System fort mostly demolished, adjacent to former Sandy Hook Proving Ground, part of Gateway National Recreation Area
New Jersey	Highlands Military Reservation/Navesink Military Reservation	Highlands	Southern New York	World War I, World War II	1917	1949	1974	Now Hartshorne Woods Park, 16-inch gun on site
New Jersey	Fort Lee	Fort Lee	Palisades	Revolutionary War	1776	1783?	1783?	Site now Monument Park with museum
New Jersey	Fort Billingsport/Fort Billings	Billingsport	Philadelphia	Revolutionary War	1777	1781	1834	Destroyed 1777, rebuilt 1778, local park, no remains
New Jersey	Fort Mercer	National Park/Red Bank	Philadelphia	Revolutionary War	1777	1781?	1781?	County park
New Jersey	Fort Mott	Pennsville	The Delaware	1870s, Endicott	1899	1943	1947	1870s work incomplete, state park, near Fort Delaware
New Jersey								See New York entries for Fort Wood, Liberty Island/Bedloe's Island and Fort Gibson, Ellis Island/Oyster Island
New York	Fort Amsterdam/Fort George/other names	Lower Manhattan	New York City	Colonial	1626	1788	1790	Alexander Hamilton U.S. Custom House now on site
New York	Fort Washington/Fort Knyphausen	Manhattan	Upper Manhattan	Revolutionary War	1776	1783?	1783?	Site is now Bennett Park
New York	Fort Jay/Fort Columbus/Nutten Island batteries	Governors Island	New York City	Revolutionary War, First System, Second System, Civil War	1776	1904	1997	Rebuilt and renamed Fort Columbus 1808–1904, national park
New York	Castle Williams	Governors Island	New York City	Second System	1811	1895	1997	National park
New York	Fort Wood	Liberty Island/Bedloe's Island	New York City	Second System	1811	1885	1937	Statue of Liberty built on top of fort, national park
New York	Fort Gibson	Ellis Island/Oyster Island	New York City	First System, Second System	1795	1861	1892	National park, fort demolished
New York	Castle Clinton/Fort Clinton	Battery Park, Manhattan	New York City	Second System	1809	1821	1821	City park
New York	Fort Lafayette/Fort Diamond	Hendricks Reef, The Narrows	New York City	Second System	1818	1898	1948	Offshore of Fort Hamilton, demolished in 1960 for the Verrazzano–Narrows Bridge
New York	Fort Gansevoort	Gansevoort Street, Manhattan	New York City	Second System	1812	1849	1854	demolished, was near west end of Gansevoort Street
New York	Fort Hamilton	Fort Hamilton, Brooklyn	Southern New York	Third System, Endicott	1831	1948		Harbor Defense Museum in fort, National Guard and Reserve base, 20-inch Rodman gun in nearby park
New York	Fort Wadsworth/Fort Tompkins/Fort Richmond (Battery Weed)/Flagstaff Fort	Staten Island	Southern New York	Colonial, Revolutionary War, Second System, Third System, Endicott	1636	1944	1994	Part of Gateway National Recreation Area, history of forts on site is complex
New York	Fort Tilden	Rockaway, Queens	Southern New York	World War I, Interwar	1917	1948	1974	Part of Gateway National Recreation Area
New York	Fort Slocum	Davids Island	Eastern New York	Endicott	1897	1919	1965	Mostly demolished, no routine access to island
New York	Fort Schuyler	Throgs Neck, The Bronx	Eastern New York	Third System, Endicott	1856	1934	1934	State University of New York Maritime College, Third System fort re-used as offices and classrooms
New York	Fort Totten/Fort at Willet's Point/Camp Morgan	Bayside, Queens	Eastern New York	Third System, 1870s, Endicott	1862	1935	1995	Police and fire training center, other uses
New York	Fort H. G. Wright	Fishers Island	Long Island Sound	Endicott, World War II	1901	1946	1948	Part of fort is a town brush dump
New York	Fort Michie	Great Gull Island	Long Island Sound	Endicott, Interwar	1900	1947	1948	American Museum of Natural History bird sanctuary, has unique 16-inch disappearing emplacement
New York	Fort Terry	Plum Island	Long Island Sound	Endicott, World War II	1900	1944	1954	USDA animal disease research center, future uncertain
New York	Fort Tyler	Gardiners Point Island	Long Island Sound	Endicott	1898	1928?	1946?	WWII target range, island is shifting and fort is breaking up
New York	Camp Hero	Montauk Point	Long Island Sound	World War II	1944	1948	1981	Large decommissioned AN/FPS-35 radar on site
North Carolina	Fort Fisher	Federal Point/Pleasure Island	Wilmington	Civil War	1862	1865	1865	Confederate-built
North Carolina	Fort Caswell	Oak Island	The Cape Fear	Third System, Endicott	1836	1925	1948	Rearmed with Panama mounts in WWII, North Carolina Baptist Assembly camp since 1949
North Carolina	Fort Johnston	Southport	Wilmington	Colonial, Revolutionary War, First System	1749	1881	2004	North Carolina Maritime Museum
North Carolina	Fort Macon/Fort Hampton	Bogue Banks	Beaufort	Second System, Third System	1811	1903	1946	Area rearmed with 155 mm GPF guns in WWII as THD Beaufort, state park
Oregon	Fort Stevens	Hammond	The Columbia	Endicott	1836	1925	1948	Bombarded by Japanese submarine in WWII, state park
Pennsylvania	Fort Mifflin	Mud Island/Deep Water Island	Philadelphia	Colonial, Revolutionary War, First System, 1870s	1777	1904	1962	near airport, mine casemates built 1876
Puerto Rico	Castillo San Felipe del Morro/Morro Castle/Fort Brooke	San Juan	San Juan	Colonial, World War I, World War II	1539	1950?	1961	
Puerto Rico	Fort Amezquita	Isla de Cabras	San Juan	World War II	1941	1948	1950?	Casemated 12-inch gun battery
Puerto Rico	Fort Charles W. Bundy	Roosevelt Roads Naval Station	Vieques Sound	World War II	1943	1947		
Puerto Rico/St. Thomas	Fort Segarra	Water Island, U.S. Virgin Islands	Vieques Sound	World War II	1944	1948	1952	Incomplete 8-inch gun battery, former chemical warfare test site
Rhode Island	Fort Adams	Newport	Narragansett Bay	First System, Third System, 1870s, Endicott	1799	1943	1950	State park, major Third System fort and Endicott batteries remain
Rhode Island	Fort Wolcott/Fort Liberty/Fort Anne	Goat Island	Newport	Colonial, Revolutionary War, First System, Second System	1703	1836	1951	Various other names over the years, site of former Naval Torpedo Station Newport, nothing remains
Rhode Island	Conanicut Battery	Jamestown	Jamestown	Revolutionary War	1776	1783	1783	Town park, earthworks remain
Rhode Island	Fort Greene	Easton's Point, Newport	Newport	First System	1794	1815?	1815?	City park
Rhode Island	Fort Hamilton	Rose Island	Newport	Revolutionary War, First System	1780	1815?	1948?	Never completed, National Historic Site
Rhode Island	Fort Dumpling/Fort Brown	Jamestown	Newport	Colonial, Revolutionary War, First System	1776	1824	1824?	Remains destroyed for Fort Wetherill 1898
Rhode Island	Fort Wetherill	Jamestown	Narragansett Bay	Endicott, Taft	1901	1947	1947	State park, most batteries remain
Rhode Island	Fort Burnside	Jamestown	Narragansett Bay	World War II	1942	1948	1948	State park, batteries and large HECP (Harbor Entrance Control Post) remain
Rhode Island	Fort Getty	Jamestown	Narragansett Bay	Taft	1910	1946	1946?	Town RV park, mostly buried
Rhode Island	Fort Greble	Dutch Island	Narragansett Bay	Endicott	1901	1942	1946?	State park, uninhabited island sometimes used for National Guard training
Rhode Island	Fort Kearny	Saunderstown	Narragansett Bay	Taft	1908	1943	1946?	University of Rhode Island Narragansett Bay campus, nuclear research reactor on top of one battery
Rhode Island	Fort Varnum	Boston Neck, Narragansett	Narragansett Bay	World War II	1942	1947		National Guard training center
Rhode Island	Fort Greene	Point Judith, Narragansett	Narragansett Bay	World War II	1943	1948		One 16-inch battery is in Fishermen's Memorial State Park, part of fort is an Army Reserve center
Rhode Island	Fort Church	Little Compton	Narragansett Bay	World War II	1942	1948	1950?	Batteries buried
Rhode Island	Fort Mansfield	Napatree Point, Westerly	Long Island Sound	Endicott	1901	1917	1926	Public beach
South Carolina	Fort Sumter	Charleston Harbor	Charleston	Third System, Endicott	1860	1946	1948	Bombardment of this fort in April 1861 was the first major action of the American Civil War, National Historic Monument
South Carolina	Fort Moultrie	Sullivan's Island	Charleston	Revolutionary War, First System, Second System, 1870s, Endicott, World War II	1776	1947	1948	National Historic Monument, great cannon collection
South Carolina	Fort Johnson	James Island	Charleston	Colonial, First System	1704	1865?	1970?	First shot of the Civil War (a signal) fired from this fort, little remains
South Carolina	The Battery	Charleston	Charleston	Civil War	1860	1865	1865	Has gun said to have fired the first effective shot (from Morris Island) of the Civil War
South Carolina	Castle Pinckney/Fort Pinckney	Charleston	Charleston	First System, Second System	1798	1878?	1933	First System fort destroyed by hurricane 1804, access by prior arrangement only
South Carolina	Fort Wagner	Morris Island	Charleston	Civil War	1862	1865	1865	Earthwork, nothing remains
South Carolina	Fort Fremont	Saint Helena Island	Port Royal Sound	Endicott	1899	1914	1921	
South Carolina	Fort Welles/Fort Walker	Hilton Head Island	Port Royal Sound	Civil War, Endicott	1861	1902	1902	Had a dynamite gun emplacement
South Carolina	Fort Marion/Beaufort Battery/Fort Lyttelton	Spanish Point, Port Royal	Port Royal	Colonial, Second System	1764	1825	1825	Archaeological site
Texas	Fort Travis	Bolivar Point	Galveston	Endicott, Interwar	1900	1946	1947	Park
Texas	Fort San Jacinto	Fort Point, Galveston Island	Galveston	Endicott, World War II	1898	1946	1947	
Texas	Fort Crockett	Galveston	Galveston	Endicott, Interwar	1899	1946	1947	Park
Texas	Fort Travis	Fort Point, Galveston Island	Galveston	Texas Revolution	1836	1844	1844	
Virginia	Fort Monroe/Fort George	Old Point Comfort, Hampton	Chesapeake Bay	Colonial, Third System, Endicott	1728	1943	2011	Initially named Fortress Monroe until 1832. National park, major fort with Casemate Museum and some Endicott batteries
Virginia	Fort Norfolk	Norfolk	Norfolk	First System, Second System	1794	1880		Park, Army Corps of Engineers offices
Virginia	Fort Nelson	Portsmouth	Norfolk	Revolutionary War, First System, Civil War	1776	1865?	1865?	Hospital Point Park near naval hospital, Fort Nelson Park commemorates
Virginia	Craney Island Fort	Craney Island, Portsmouth	Norfolk	Second System, Civil War	1813	1865		Battle of Craney Island in the War of 1812 fought here
Virginia	Fort Wool/Fort Calhoun	Rip Raps, Hampton Roads	Chesapeake Bay	Third System, Endicott	1834	1946	1967	Renamed in 1862, bird sanctuary, no public access
Virginia	Fort John Custis	Cape Charles	Chesapeake Bay	World War II	1942	1948	1981	National wildlife refuge, 16-inch gun on site
Virginia	Fort Story	Virginia Beach	Chesapeake Bay	World War I, Interwar, World War II	1917	1948		Now part of Joint Expeditionary Base Little Creek–Fort Story
Virginia	Fort Hunt	Fort Hunt	The Potomac	Endicott	1898	1920	1946	National park, batteries well-preserved
Virginia	Fort Powhatan/Fort Hood	Windmill Hill, Prince George County	The James	Revolutionary War, Second System, Civil War	1779	1865	1865	Abandoned 1830–1861, portions remain
Virginia	Fort Boykin/The Castle	Smithfield, Isle of Wight County	The James	Colonial, Revolutionary War, War of 1812, Civil War	1623	1862	1865	Rebuilt for each war, county park, portions remain
Virginia	Fort Huger	Harden's Bluff, Isle of Wight County	The James	Civil War	1862	1862	1865	County park, portions remain
Washington	Fort Columbia	Chinook	The Columbia	Endicott, World War II	1898	1945	1950	State park, former Civil Defense bunker
Washington	Fort Canby/Fort Cape Disappointment	Cape Disappointment	The Columbia	Civil War, Endicott, World War II	1864	1947	1947	State park, said to be site of Lewis and Clark arriving at the Pacific
Washington	Fort Ward	Bainbridge Island	Puget Sound	Endicott	1903	1925	1958	Local park
Washington	Fort Whitman	Goat Island	Puget Sound	Taft	1911	1943	1947	
Washington	Fort Flagler	Marrowstone Island	Puget Sound	Endicott	1902	1946	1953	State park
Washington	Fort Casey	Admiralty Head, Whidbey Island	Puget Sound	Endicott	1899	1942	1956	State park, remounted 10-inch and 3-inch guns from the Philippines
Washington	Fort Worden	Point Wilson, Port Townsend	Puget Sound	Endicott	1900	1946	1953	State park
Washington	Fort Ebey	Partridge Point, Whidbey Island	Puget Sound	World War II	1943	1946	1950?	State park
Washington	Camp Hayden	Joyce	Cape Flattery	World War II	1944	1948	1948	State recreation area

== See also ==
- Seacoast defense in the United States
- Harbor Defense Command
- United States Army Coast Artillery Corps
- United States Army Corps of Engineers
- List of forts in the United States
