= Eastern Point Fort =

1860s fort in Gloucester, Massachusetts

- Eastern Point, Gloucester, Massachusetts

Site information
- Type: Coastal defense
- Owner: private
- Open to the public: no
- Condition: earthworks remain

Location
- Location in Massachusetts Eastern Point Fort (the United States)
- Coordinates: 42°35′8.32″N 70°39′30.93″W

Site history
- Built: 1863
- Built by: Major Charles E. Blunt, US Army
- In use: 1863–1867
- Materials: earthworks
- Battles/wars: American Civil War

Eastern Point Fort was a fort that was garrisoned or maintained from 1863 to 1867 on Eastern Point in Gloucester, Massachusetts, built for the American Civil War. References indicate the name has also been used to refer to the much-older Stage Fort across the harbor.

In June 1863, Confederate commerce raiders attacked Gloucester-based fishing vessels at Georges Bank, a rich fishing ground east of Cape Cod. Also that year, US Army engineers realized that attacking vessels could be well inside Gloucester's harbor before being engaged by the existing forts, Stage Fort and Fort Defiance. The Eastern Point fort, never formally named, was sited to be able to engage any enemy approaching from seaward. It was built near the end of the peninsula forming the eastern side of Gloucester's harbor, on the "high land of the farm of Thomas Niles". Construction was supervised by Major Charles E. Blunt. Eastern Point was the only Civil War fort on the north shore of Massachusetts Bay not on the site of a previous fortification.

The fort was an earthwork that could accommodate seven guns, with three magazines and a bombproof shelter, along with a barracks and hospital outside the fort. However, an armament report dated January 31, 1865 shows ten guns were on hand, including three 32-pounder rifled guns, four 32-pounder smoothbore guns, and three 24-pounder rifled guns. An author has examined a period photograph and determined that the 24-pounders could have been in the bombproof, which was sited for landward defense with embrasures suitable for cannon. Eastern Point was garrisoned by the 2nd and 11th Unattached Companies of Massachusetts militia in 1864. The fort was abandoned in 1867 and the buildings demolished at some point, though the earthworks remain.

In the 1920s a resort hotel or manor house named the "Ramparts" was built inside the fort, featuring two stone towers. The main building was razed in 1950, though the towers remain. Today, a private residence exists within the former earthworks of the fort, incorporating one of the towers. During World War II the army built a Fire Control Station nearby the earthworks.

== See also ==
- Stage Fort
- Fort Defiance (Massachusetts)
- Seacoast defense in the United States
- List of coastal fortifications of the United States
- List of military installations in Massachusetts
