= Kinder Farm Park =

Park in Anne Arundel County, Maryland, US

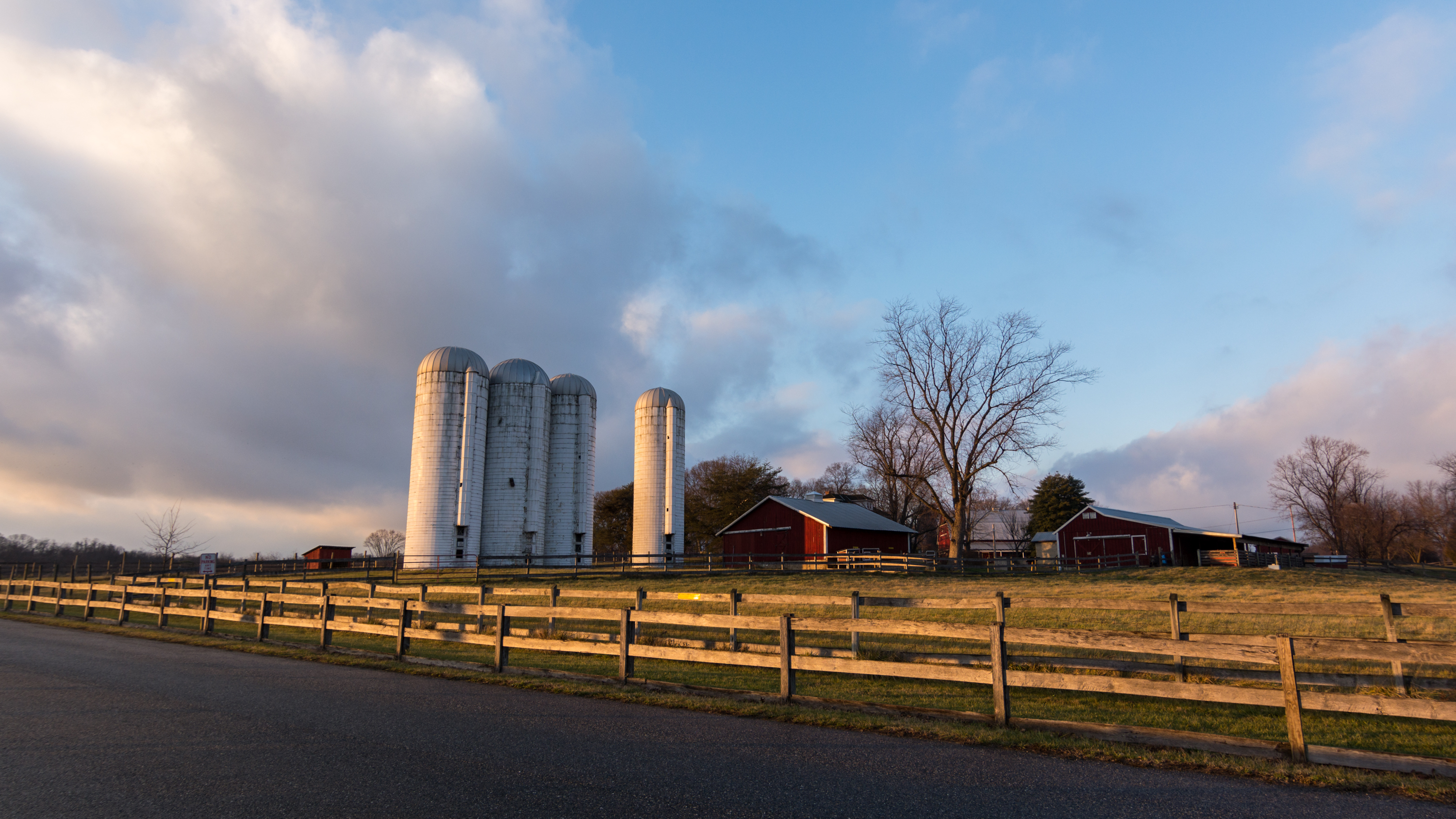
- The Farm, seen from Gali Sanchez Way

- Location within Maryland Location within the United States
- Location: Millersville, Maryland
- Coordinates: 39°06′05″N 76°35′04″W
- Area: 288 acres (117 ha)

Kinder Farm Park is a park located in Millersville, Anne Arundel County, Maryland, United States. The park contains 288 acres (1.17 km^{2}) and is operated by Anne Arundel County Recreation and Parks. It is open year-round. Organizations using the park include the Friends of Kinder Farm Park and the Kinder Farm Park 4H Livestock Club.

== History ==
The park is named after the Kinder family, who once ran the farm that now exists within the park. The family made its first land purchases within Anne Arundel County in 1892, and at their peak owned 1,100 acres of farmland within the county. In the decades that followed World War II, the family slowly began selling off pieces of the land for residential development. In 1979, they decided to sell the remaining 288 acres to Anne Arundel County on the condition that the land be used as a park. They did this because they wanted to preserve the farm's history and provide an open space in an area that was becoming more and more developed.

== See also ==
- Downs Park
- Fort Smallwood Park
- Quiet Waters Park
