= Stage Fort =

Fort in Massachusetts, US, 1635 to 1898

- Stage Fort Park, Gloucester, Massachusetts
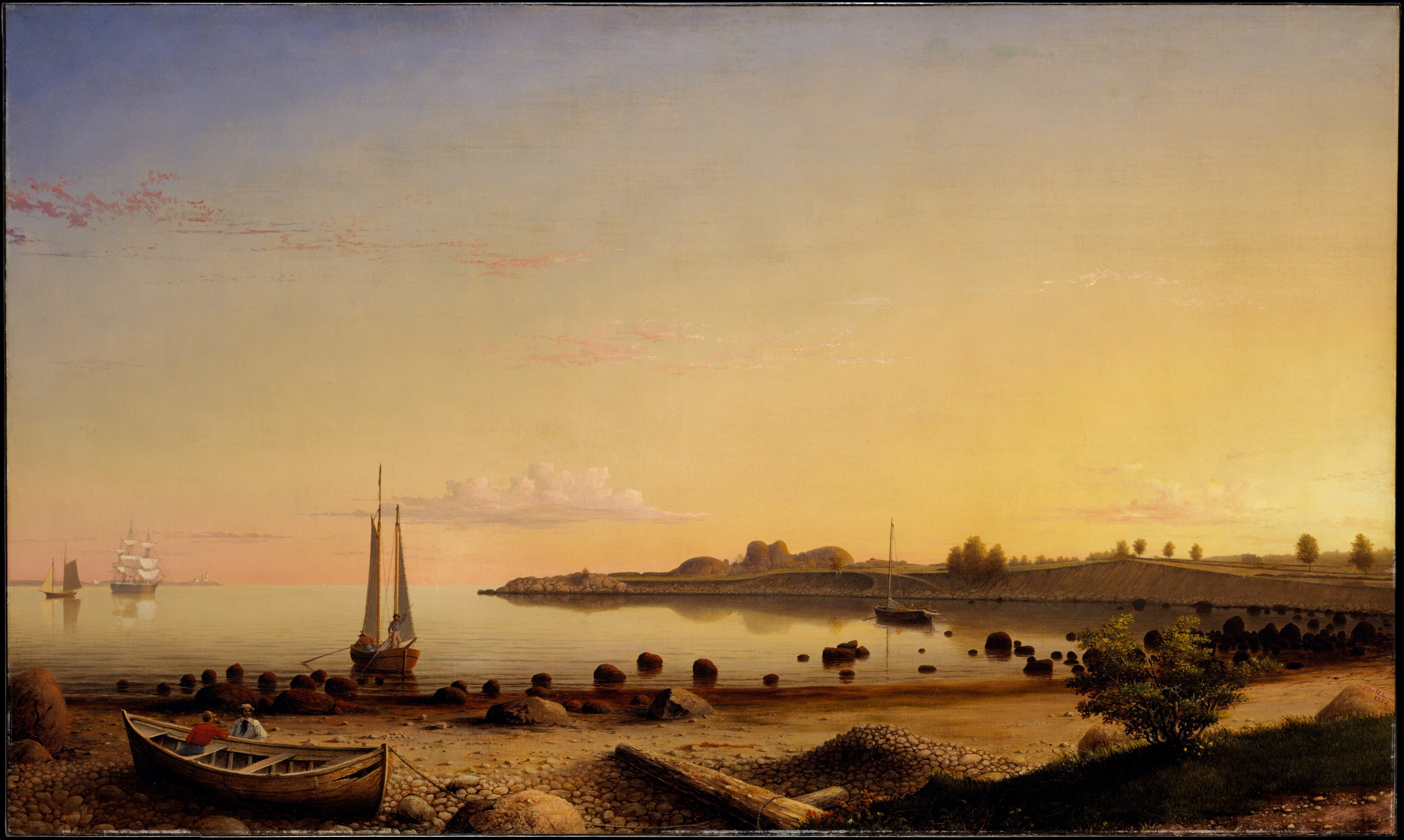
- Stage Fort across Gloucester Harbor, 1862 painting including the Stage Fort by Fitz Henry Lane

Site information
- Type: Coastal defense
- Owner: City of Gloucester
- Open to the public: yes
- Condition: reconstructed

Location
- Location in Massachusetts Stage Fort (the United States)
- Coordinates: 42°36′18″N 70°40′33″W

Site history
- Built: 1635
- In use: circa 1635–1898
- Materials: earthworks
- Battles/wars: American Revolutionary War; War of 1812; American Civil War

Stage Fort was a fort that existed from 1635 to 1898 on Stage Head in what is now Stage Fort Park in Gloucester, Massachusetts.

Stage Head was named for a fishing "stage" dating back to the original settlement by the Dorchester Adventurers Company circa 1624. The area was first fortified in 1635 and garrisoned intermittently from then until the Spanish–American War.

== History ==
After the first fort was built on the site in 1635, the next upgrade was a rudimentary fortified breastwork in 1703 for Queen Anne's War. New breastworks and a platform for eight 12-pounder cannon were built in 1743 for King George's War. The fort was refurbished for the French and Indian War circa 1754. Another breastwork was built for the American Revolutionary War in October 1775. In the War of 1812 the fort was repaired and a barracks added.

The fort was further renovated circa 1862 for the American Civil War under the supervision of Major Charles E. Blunt, and called Fort Conant after early settler Roger Conant. He arrived at Stage Head circa 1626 and is credited as the Cape Ann colony's first governor. He resided in a "great house" near Stage Head, which was moved to Salem by his successor John Endecott circa 1628. An 1864 plan of the fort shows embrasures for four guns and a magazine. An armament list for the fort dated January 31, 1865 shows three 32-pounder smoothbore guns mounted. Also, the Eastern Point Fort was built in 1863 to provide a fort much nearer the harbor entrance. In the Spanish–American War of 1898, a military camp named Camp Hobson was at or near Stage Fort.

== Present ==
The fort was reconstructed for tourism in 1930, with a further reconstruction and the addition of period and reproduction cannon in 1973. It is open to the public in Stage Fort Park, which also includes Gloucester's welcome center for visitors.

== Historical names ==
Over nearly four centuries of existence, the fort on Stage Head has been known by many names. In addition to Stage Fort and Fort Conant, references list Fort Gloucester (Fort at Gloucester was used by the US Army for Fort Defiance), Fort Point, Fort Eastern Point, and other variants of these names. Fort Banks, Fort Cross, and Fort Allen were alternate names during the Fort Conant period of the Civil War. The Eastern Point name may refer to the Eastern Point Fort, which was built in 1863 across the harbor. Fort Point is also used for the land Fort Defiance was built on.

== See also ==
- Fort Defiance (Massachusetts)
- Seacoast defense in the United States
- List of coastal fortifications of the United States
- List of military installations in Massachusetts
