= Stage Fort across Gloucester Harbor =

1862 painting by Fitz Henry Lane

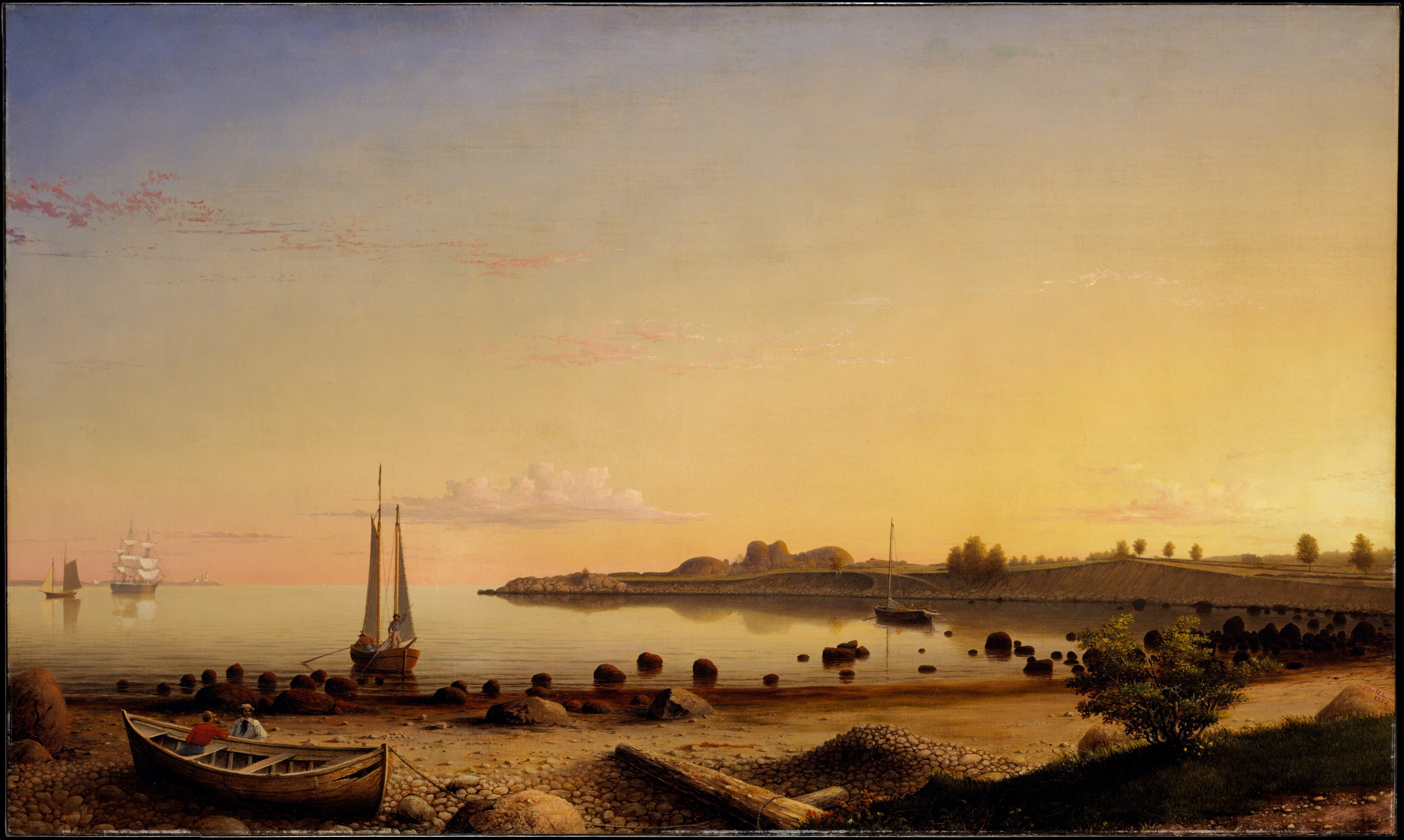
- Artist: Fitz Henry Lane
- Year: 1862
- Medium: Oil on canvas
- Dimensions: 96.5 cm × 152.4 cm (38.0 in × 60.0 in)
- Location: Metropolitan Museum of Art; New York
- Accession: 1978.203

Stage Fort across Gloucester Harbor is a mid 19th century painting by American artist Fitz Henry Lane. The painting is in the collection of the Metropolitan Museum of Art in New York city.

Done in oil on canvas, the work depicts the Stage Fort in Gloucester, Massachusetts, once a military installation and now in Stage Fort Park. The detailed foreground links to the sparely rendered background via the curving spit of land in a style typical of Lane's later work.

The painting is on view at the Metropolitan Museum's Gallery 761.
