= Fort Defiance (Massachusetts) =

Fort Defiance/Fort Lillie/Fort at Gloucester
- Fort Point, Gloucester, Massachusetts
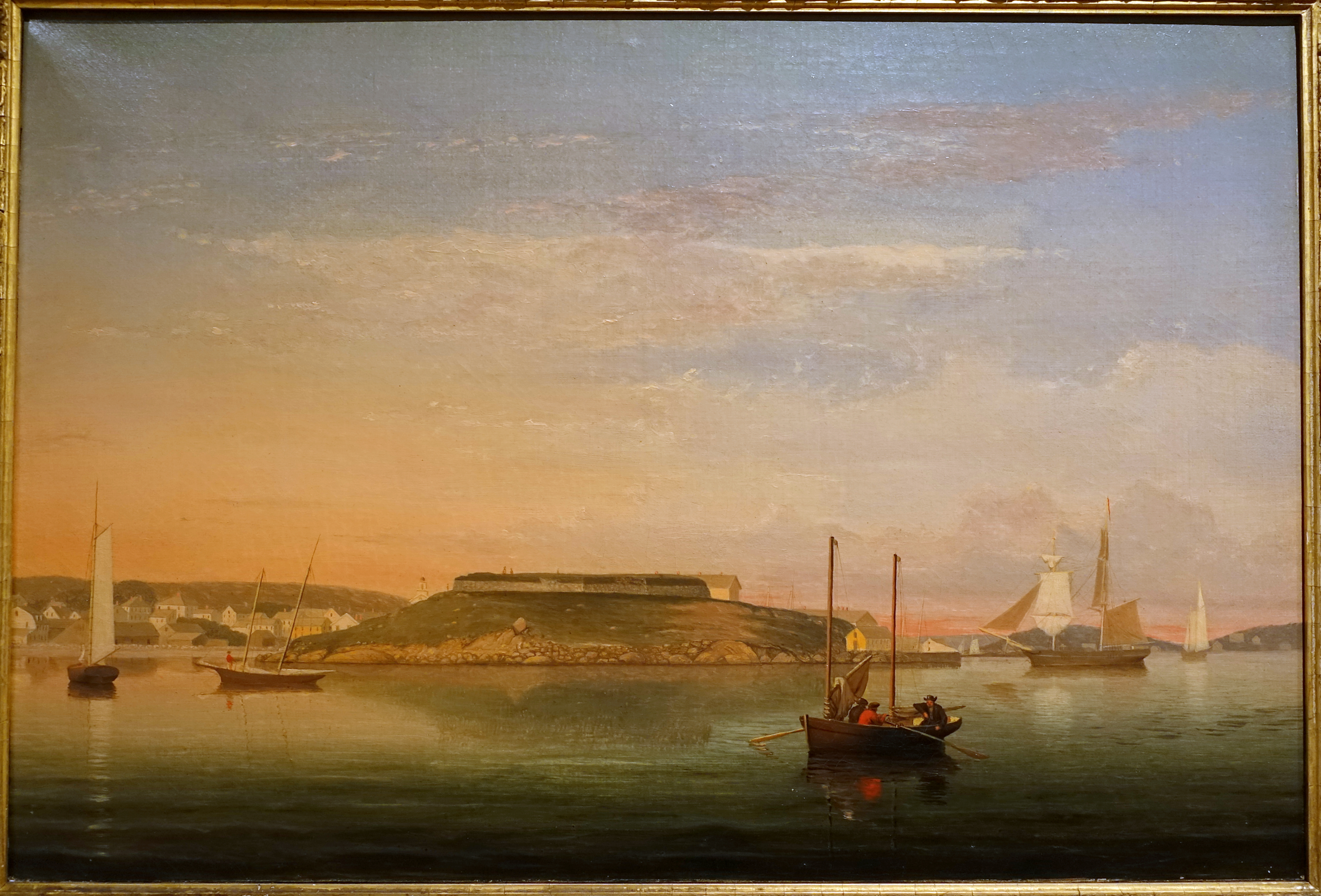
- Watch House Point, 1860 painting of Fort Defiance by Fitz Henry Lane

Site information
- Type: Coastal defense
- Condition: demolished

Location
- Location in Massachusetts Fort Defiance/Fort Lillie/Fort at Gloucester (the United States)
- Coordinates: 42°36′31.32″N 70°39′50.49″W

Site history
- Built: 1794
- Built by: Stephen Rochefontaine and John Lillie
- In use: circa 1794–1865
- Materials: masonry, earthworks
- Demolished: after 1865
- Battles/wars: War of 1812; American Civil War

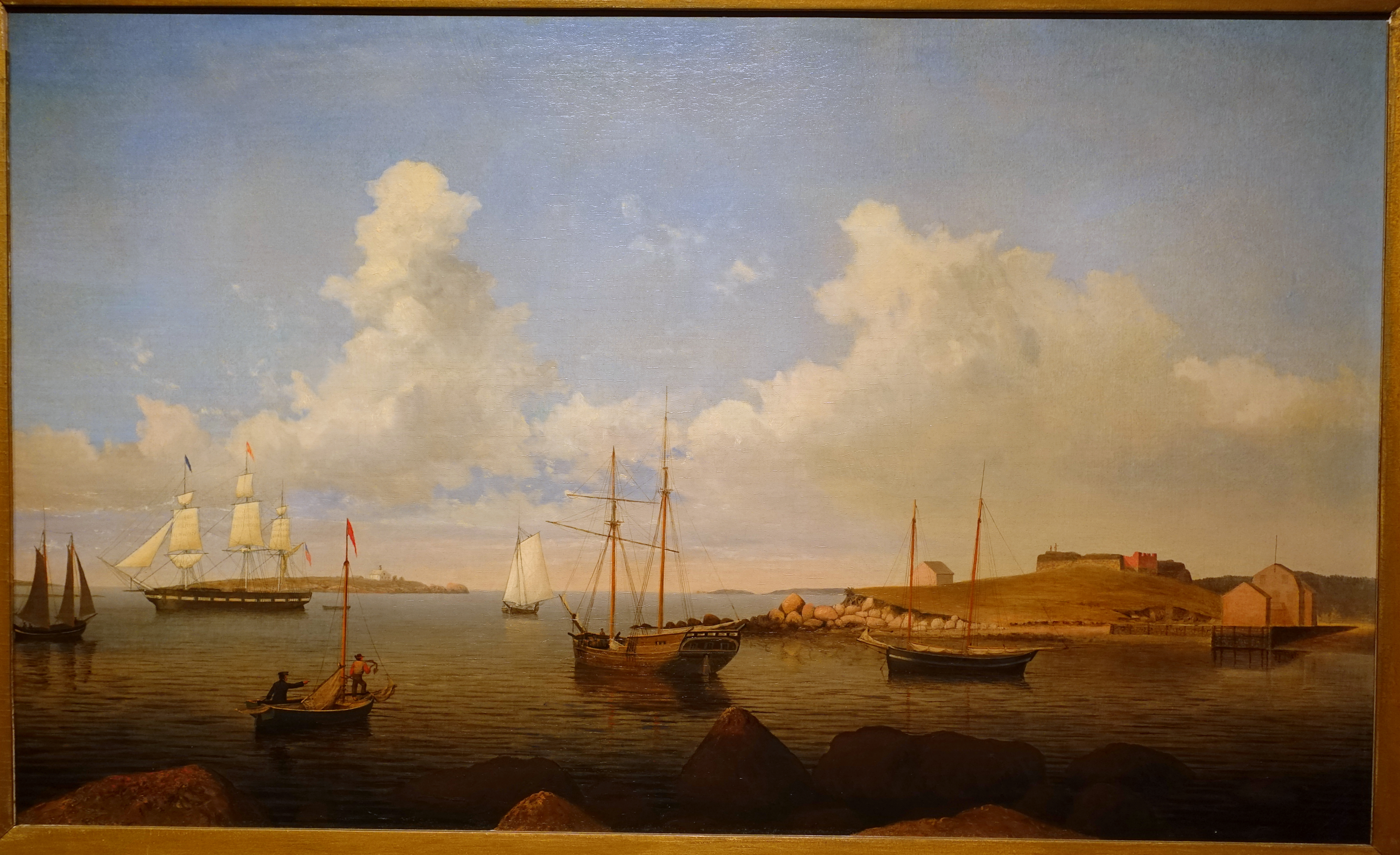
The Old Fort and Ten Pound Island, 1850s painting of Fort Defiance by Fitz Henry Lane

Fort Defiance was a fort that existed from 1794 to after 1865 on Fort Point in Gloucester, Massachusetts. The location protecting the inner harbor was also called Watch House Point.

== History ==
=== 18th century ===
Prior to the establishment of Fort Defiance, the British Fort Anne was located on Watch House Point, built in 1703 for Queen Anne's War and rebuilt in 1743 for King George's War, the latter work possibly named Fort Libby. A fortified breastwork was erected on the site during the American Revolutionary War. In 1794 a fort at Gloucester was funded as part of the federal first system of U.S. fortifications. The selectmen of Gloucester requested that Fort Anne be rebuilt as the new fort. The fort was built at the direction of Stephen Rochefontaine, a former French military engineer and Revolutionary War veteran working in the United States as a civilian; the next year he was commissioned a lieutenant colonel and commander of the Corps of Artillerists and Engineers. Assisting him was Major John Lillie, a former artillery officer with the Continental Army and possibly the fort's namesake. The goal was to mount eight seacoast guns with a separate citadel, but as no federal funds were appropriated after 1795, it is not clear how much was accomplished. It was popularly called Fort Lillie until 1814 but never assigned an official name except Fort at Gloucester by the US Army.

=== 19th century ===
The fort was probably upgraded in 1807 under the second system of U.S. fortifications, as it appears in the secretary of war's fortifications report dated December 1808. It is briefly mentioned as "the old fort of stone, in front of this place... has been repaired". The report for December 1811 states "At the head of the harbor, an enclosed battery, mounting seven guns, covered by a blockhouse". In 1814, during the War of 1812, the fort was renamed Fort Defiance. The fort went into caretaker status after that war, but the caretaker was later removed. The fort was burned by vandals in 1833, and rebuilt in 1851. Watch House Point, an 1860 painting of the fort by Fitz Henry Lane, shows the fort with stone-faced walls topped by earth. It was garrisoned during the Civil War and possibly rearmed. Abandoned after that war, the land remained a federal reservation into the 1920s; it is unclear when the fort was demolished. Currently, nothing remains of the fort.

== See also ==
- Stage Fort
- Eastern Point Fort
- Seacoast defense in the United States
- List of coastal fortifications of the United States
- List of military installations in Massachusetts

== Bibliography ==
- Heitman, Francis B. (1914). Historical Register of Officers of the Continental Army, April 1775 to December 1783. Washington, DC: The Rare Book Shop Publishing Co.
- Manuel, Dale A. (Summer 2019). "Massachusetts North Shore Civil War Forts". Coast Defense Journal. Vol. 33, no. 3. Mclean, Virginia: CDSG Press.
- Pierce, Edward Lillie (1896). Major John Lillie and the Lillie family of Boston, 1663–1896, rev. ed. Cambridge, Mass.: John Wilson and Son, University Press.
- Roberts, Robert B. (1988). Encyclopedia of Historic Forts: The Military, Pioneer, and Trading Posts of the United States. New York: Macmillan. ISBN 0-02-926880-X.
- Wade, Arthur P. (2011). Artillerists and Engineers: The Beginnings of American Seacoast Fortifications, 1794–1815. CDSG Press. ISBN 978-0-9748167-2-2.
