= Quiet Waters Park (Maryland) =

Park in Annapolis, Maryland, United States

- Location within Maryland
- Location: Annapolis, Maryland
- Coordinates: 38°56′16″N 76°30′16″W
- Area: 340 acres (140 ha)

Quiet Waters Park is a park in eastern Anne Arundel County, Maryland, United States. It contains 340 acres (1.4 km^{2}) and is operated by the Anne Arundel Recreation and Parks. It is open year-round. Organizations using the park include the Friends of Quiet Waters Park. As of 2023, it attracts over 800,000 visitors a year.

== History ==
The park opened on Labor Day in 1990 after a protracted political fight. Then-County Executive O. James Lighthizer later said that getting the park open was "the toughest political fight in my 16 years of politics," but that it was worth it because after it opened, "everybody in the community, no exceptions, loved it."

The land where the park now sits was purchased in early 1986 by developers who planned to build 250 luxury homes. When neighboring communities found out about this, the city of Annapolis and Lighthizer intervened, and the land was purchased by the county on October 30, 1987. Some in the community felt that the land should be left untouched, but a plan for a park modeled after Druid Hill Park in Baltimore and Central Park in New York City was put in motion. The park cost $12 million to develop, surpassing the original estimate of $8 million.

== Amenities ==
=== Boat launch dock and rental ===
Quiet Waters Park has a dock on Harness Creek where people can place their canoes and kayaks in the water.

=== Blue Heron Center ===
The Blue Heron Center is an indoor banquet hall in Quiet Waters Park that is used for weddings, conferences, and other formal events. The facility can be rented in eight-hour increments and seats up to 150 people at 15 round and four rectangular tables. The Blue Heron Center has a landscaped terrace with fountains, a caterer's prep kitchen, and vehicle parking.

=== Concert stage ===
An outdoor concert stage on Quiet Waters Park Road is used to host free concerts and events hosted by the Friends of Quiet Waters Park.

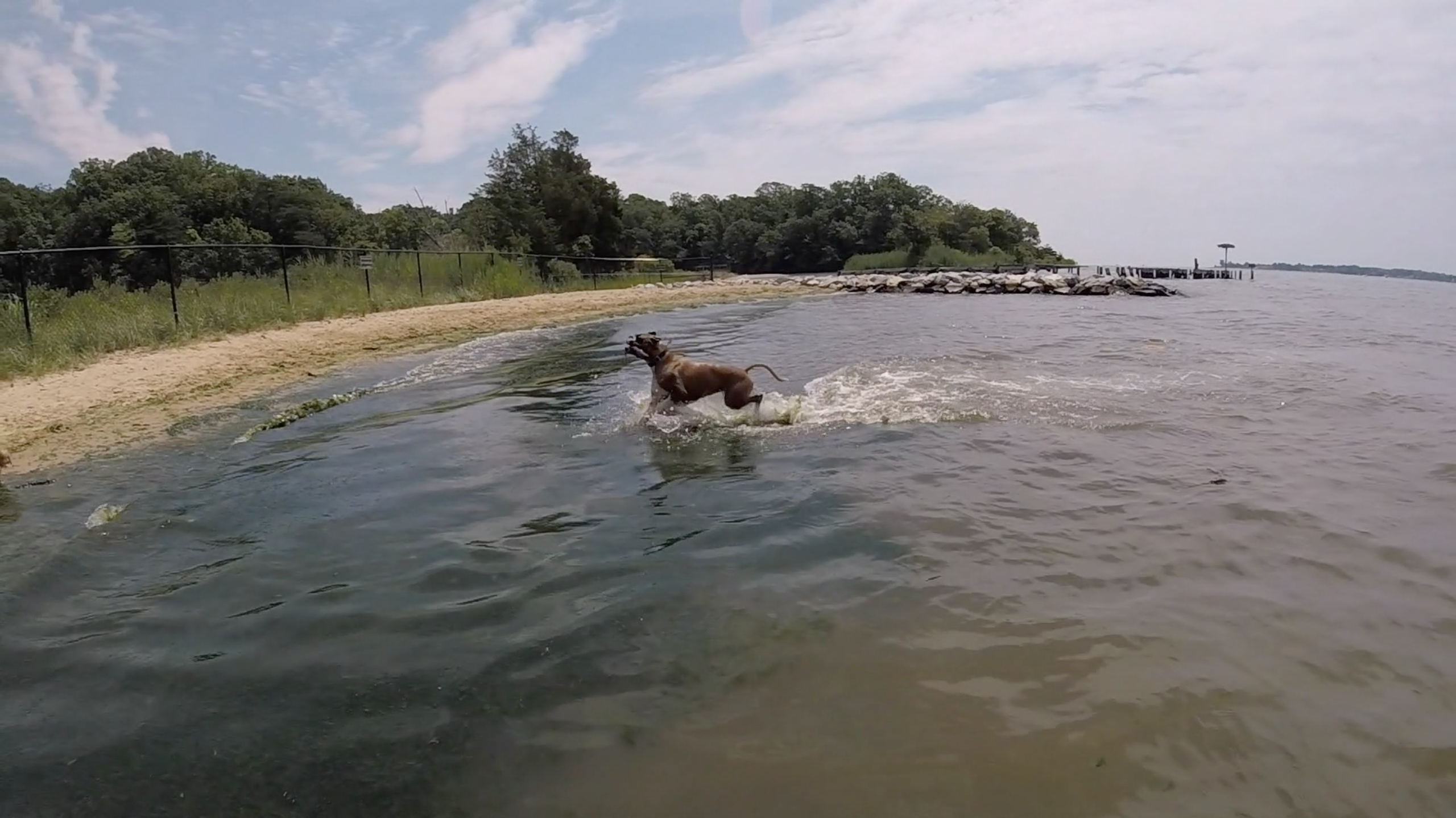
Dog playing at Quiet Waters Park

=== Dog beach ===
A dog beach is at the southernmost part of Quiet Waters Park near the South River. It is partially enclosed by a chain-link fence.

=== Dog park ===
Quiet Waters Park also has a dog park completely surrounded by a chain-link fence.

=== Pavilions ===
Quiet Waters Park includes two small and four large covered pavilions equipped with grills and picnic tables. The pavilions can be rented for parties and cook-outs.

=== Trails ===
Six miles of paved trails wind throughout the 340 acres of the park.

=== Visitor center ===
Information about Quiet Waters Park can be found at the visitor center. The center also has three art galleries: the Willow Gallery, the Garden Gallery, and the Dogwood Gallery. These display the artwork of regional and local artists.

== See also ==
- Downs Park
- Fort Smallwood Park
- Kinder Farm Park
