= Fort Smallwood Park =

Historic fort and park in Anne Arundel County, Maryland

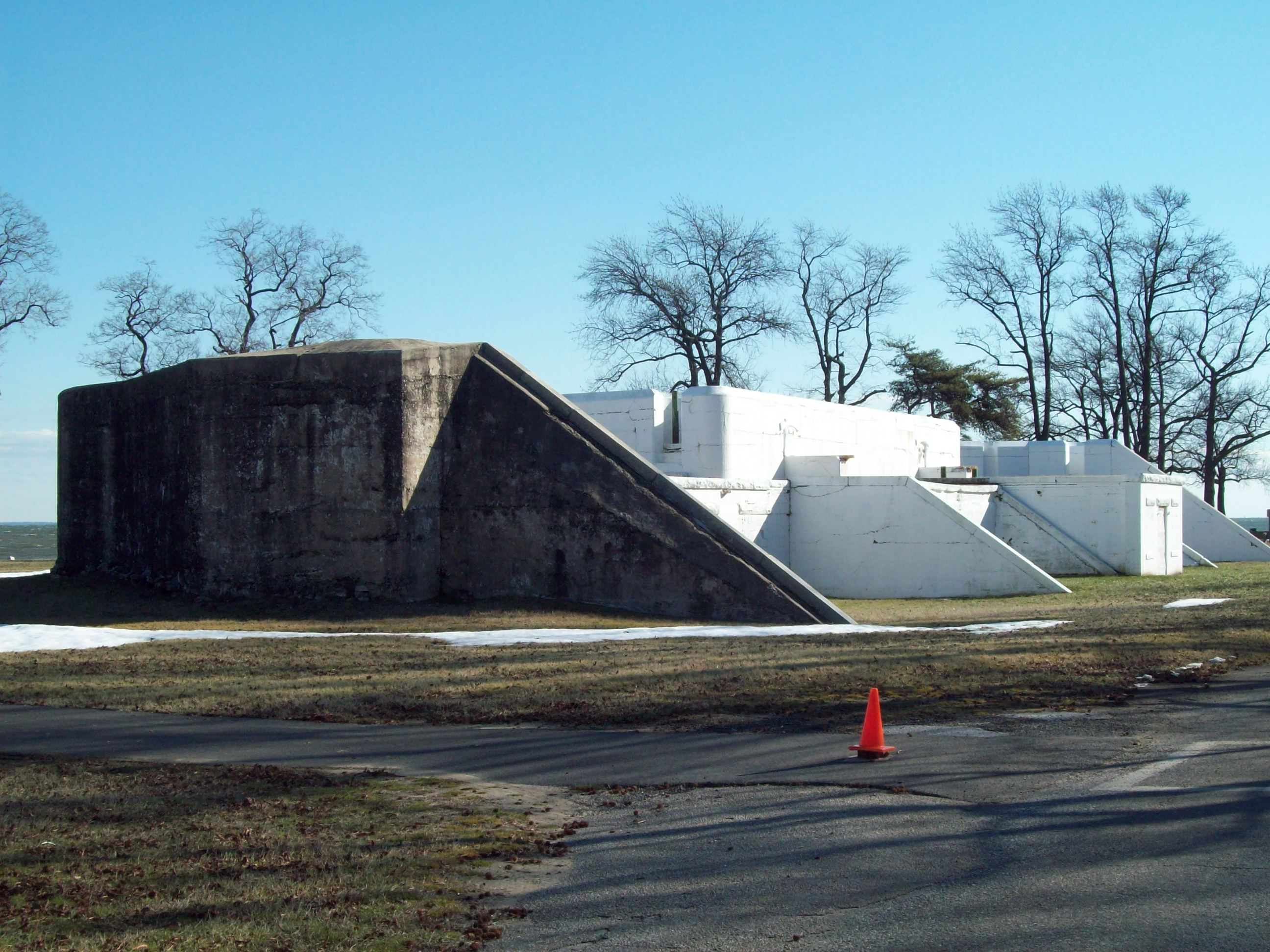
- Battery Hartshorne, Fort Smallwood Park, December 2009
- Interactive map of Fort Smallwood Park
- Location: Anne Arundel County, Maryland, U.S.
- Nearest city: Pasadena, Maryland
- Coordinates: 39°9′50″N 76°28′51″W
- Established: 1928
- Governing body: Anne Arundel County, Maryland

Fort Smallwood Park is a county park in northeastern Anne Arundel County, near Riviera Beach and Pasadena, Maryland, United States. It is located on the outer Patapsco River as it meets the Chesapeake Bay, on a peninsula known as Rock Point.

On April 1, 2006, it became a regional park in the Anne Arundel County Park System, after being transferred from the Department of Recreation and Parks of Baltimore City after extensive decades-long negotiations. On September 19, 2009, County Executive John R. Leopold officially dedicated the 380-foot (120 m) fishing pier at Fort Smallwood Park "Bill Burton Fishing Pier", named for the long-time Baltimore Sun outdoorsman/reporter and columnist. The previous pier was destroyed in 2003 by Hurricane Isabel. It provides a view of the Sparrows Point plant of Mittal Steel Company (formerly owned by Bethlehem Steel Corporation), one of the largest steel manufacturing complexes in the world.

Fort Smallwood Road (Maryland Route 173) leads from Patapsco Avenue and Pennington Avenue in Brooklyn-Curtis Bay in southern Baltimore City across Curtis Creek, past the U.S. Coast Guard Yard through the Arundel Cove-Hawkins Point area to Riviera Beach and Pasadena coastal communities across Stony Creek to the old fort and park.

A cluster of rock outcroppings known as White Rocks is located in the water northwest of the park.

== History ==
From 1896 to 1928, it was an Endicott Period Coastal Fort built during the Spanish–American War era along with other outer harbor defenses at Fort Howard on North Point in southeastern Baltimore County and Fort Armistead at Hawkins Point on the Baltimore City-Anne Arundel County Line of 1919. It was named for Revolutionary War Maj. Gen. William Smallwood (1732–1792), commander of the "Maryland Line" regiment in the Continental Army who later became fourth governor of Maryland (1785–1788).

From 1928 to 2006, it was a city park of the City of Baltimore and was an extremely popular weekend picnicking, swimming and fishing site for city and county citizens in the 1930s to the 80s, until later eclipsed by other Chesapeake Bay resorts and eventually Ocean City and the Delaware beaches after the construction of the Chesapeake Bay Bridge in 1952. Besides Robert E. Lee Memorial Park surrounding Lake Roland, a former Baltimore City Public Works Department watershed system parcel since 1860, located just across the northern city limits in Baltimore County, Fort Smallwood was the only city park located outside the 1919 city limits.

It is the location of Battery Hartshorne, named on November 18, 1902, in honor of Captain Benjamin M. Hartshorne Jr., 7th U. S. Infantry, who was killed on January 2, 1902, in action with insurgents near Lanang, Samar, Philippine Islands during the Philippine–American War. Two six-inch disappearing carriage guns were mounted here from 1900 to 1927.

== Recreation ==
- Picnic areas
- Walking trails
- Horseshoe pits, volleyball courts and other family recreation facilities
- Historic gun battery and old barracks (Battery Hartshorne)
- Chesapeake Bay beaches
- Historic picnic pavilion
- Playground
- Bill Burton Fishing Pier
- Boat ramps
- Swimming

== Gallery ==
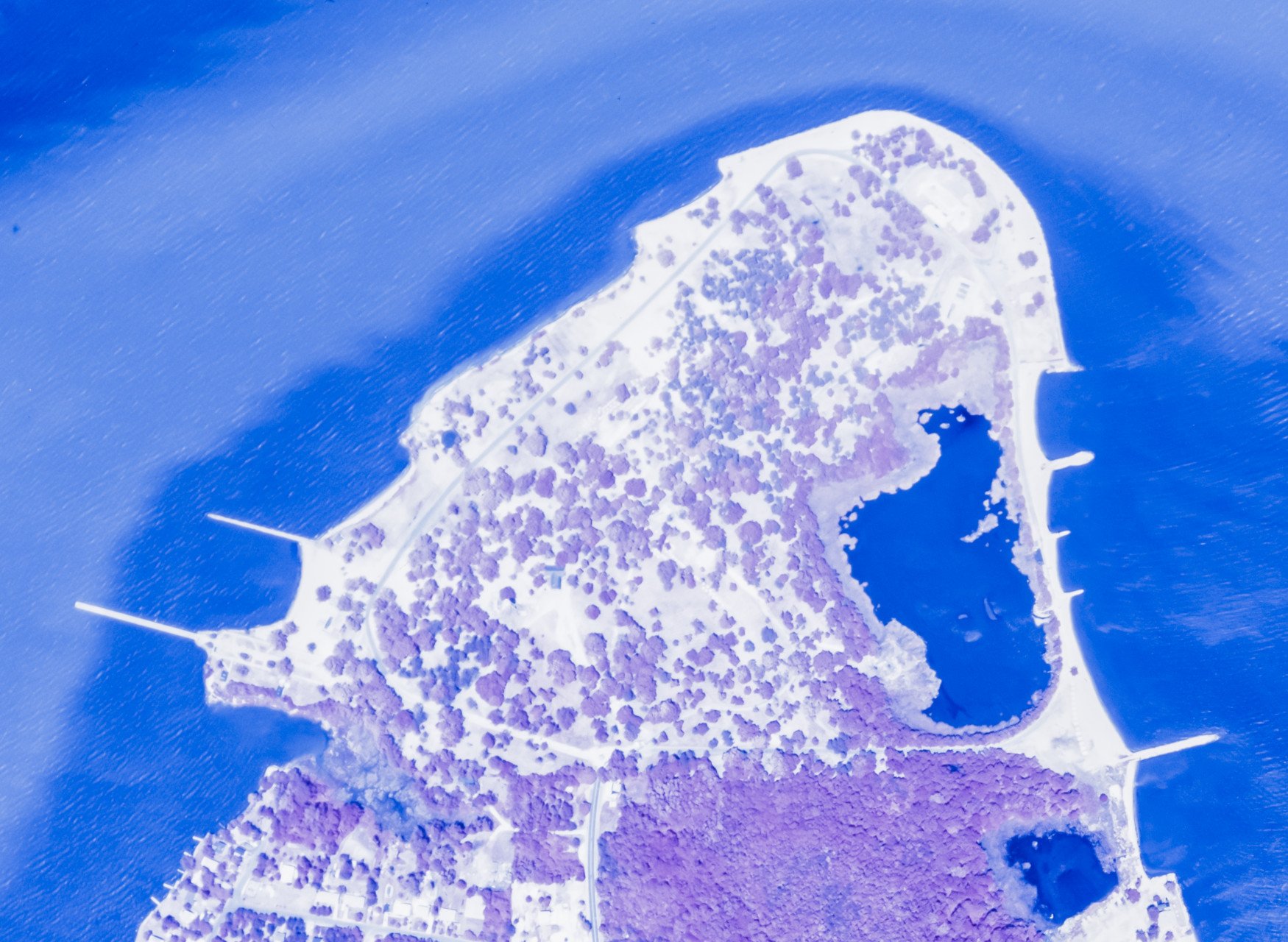
Fort Smallwood Park in 1976

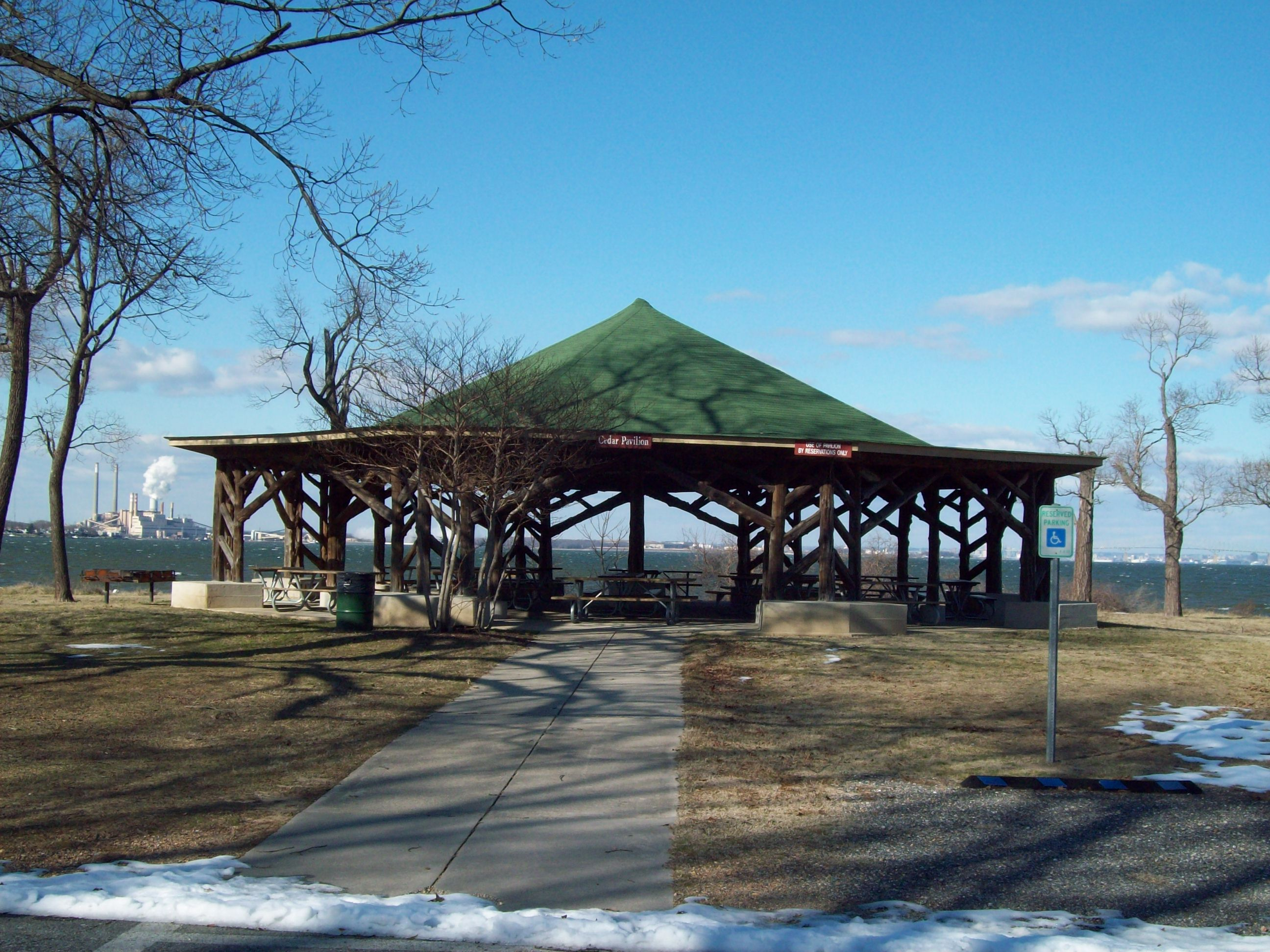
Cedar Pavilion, Ft. Smallwood Park, December 2009

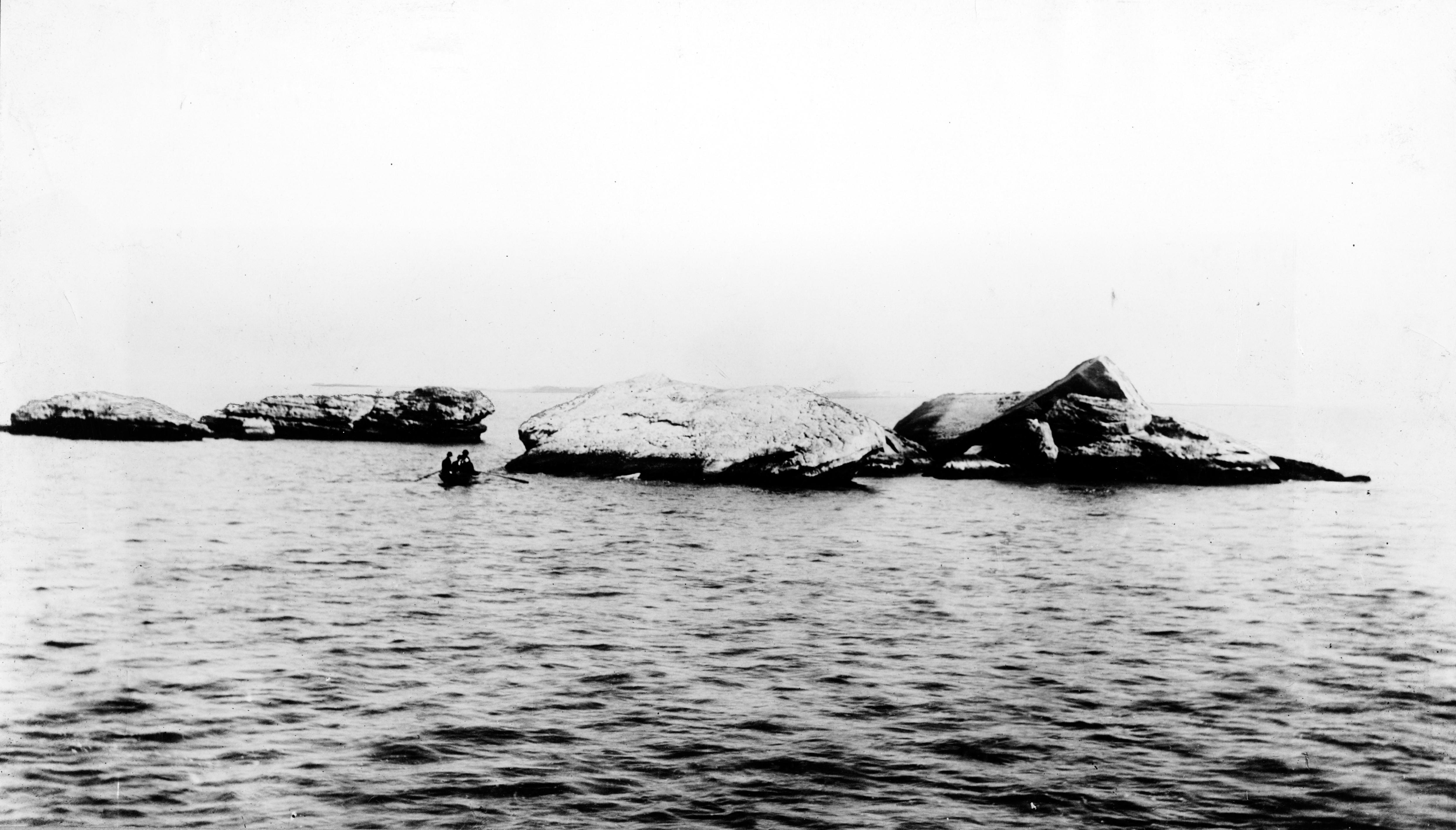
White Rocks, 1912

== See also ==
- Downs Park
- Kinder Farm Park
- Quiet Waters Park
