= Downs Park =

236 Acre Park on The Chesapeake Bay in Maryland, US

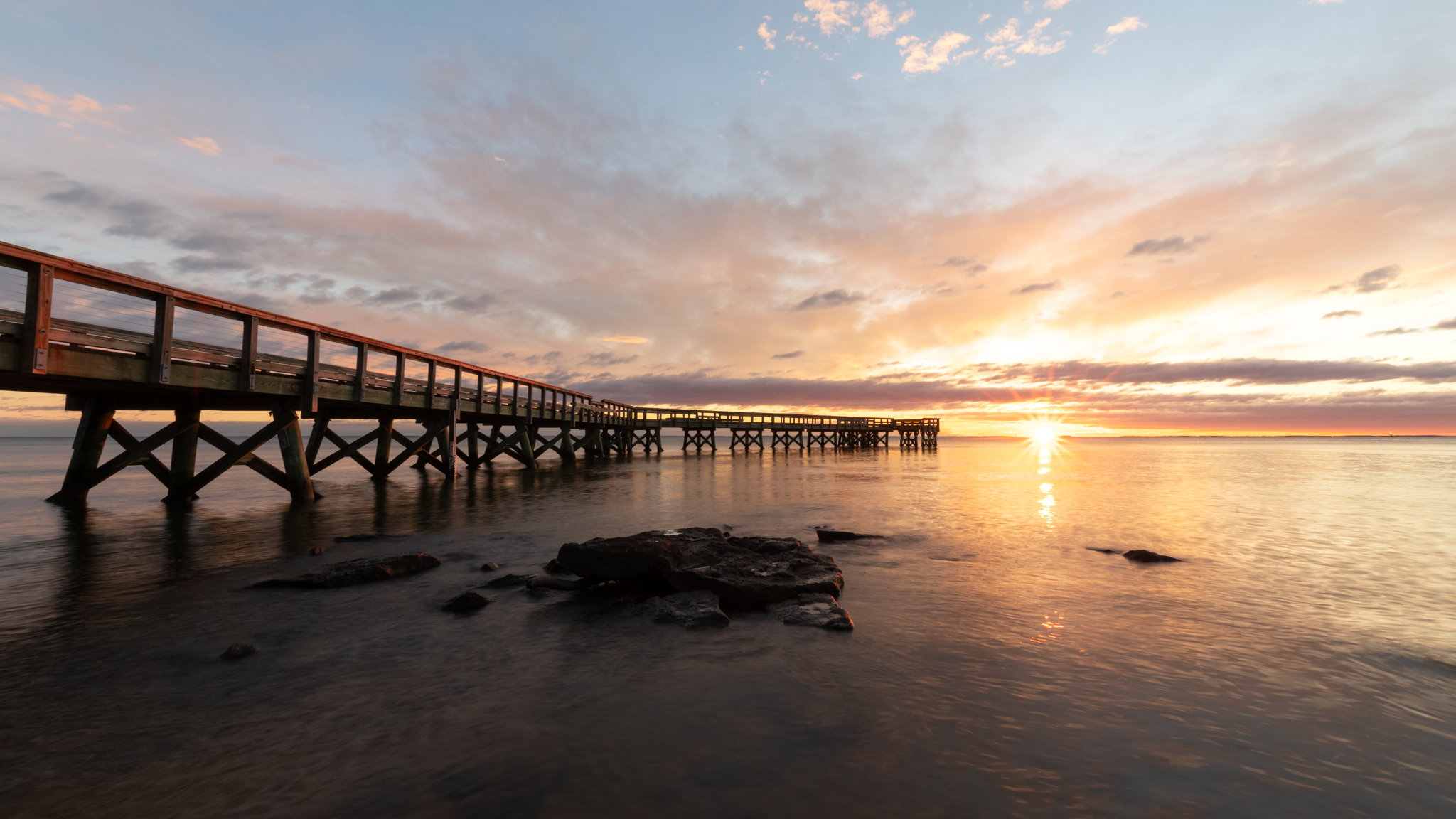
- Downs Park public pier

- Location within Maryland Location within the United States
- Location: Pasadena, Maryland
- Coordinates: 39°06′34″N 76°26′25″W
- Area: 288 acres (117 ha)

Downs Park is located in Pasadena, Anne Arundel County, Maryland, United States. The park consists of 236 acres (0.96 km^{2}) and spans around 2,000 ft (610 m) of shoreline. It is operated by Anne Arundel County Recreation and Parks and is open year-round. Organizations using the park include the Friends of Downs Park, Garden Volunteers, Volunteers-in-the-Park and the Downs Park Quilters Guild.

== History ==
The land that makes up Downs Park changed hands several times in the 1700s and 1800s, before finally winding up in the possession of H.R. Mayo Thom, a tobacco importer. He used the property to create what was known as the Rocky Beach Farm, which included a mansion for his family, along with several cottages for his friends and workers. Most of this development is now gone, though some remnants still remain, with pavilions standing where vacation homes once were.

In 1977 the county purchased the farm and developed the land into Downs Park. On July 1, 1982, the park opened to the public.

== Amenities ==
=== Dog beach ===
The dog beach can be found in the northeastern part of the park.

=== Mother's Garden ===
This Victorian-style garden was built in 1915 for Helen Hopkins Thom, and was maintained until sometime in the 1960s. When the park opened in 1982, volunteers revitalized the aged garden and it has since become a popular spot for weddings.

=== Pavilions ===
The park contains three pavilions which can accommodate around 100 people, and one small pavilion that can accommodate around 50 people.

=== Sports ===
The park has two basketball courts.

=== Trails ===
The park contains five miles of paved and natural trails.

=== Youth camping area ===
The park also offers a camping area for organized youth groups.

== See also ==
- Fort Smallwood Park
- Kinder Farm Park
- Quiet Waters Park
