= Fort Armistead =

United States Army coastal defense fort

Coordinates: 39°12′32″N 76°32′02″W

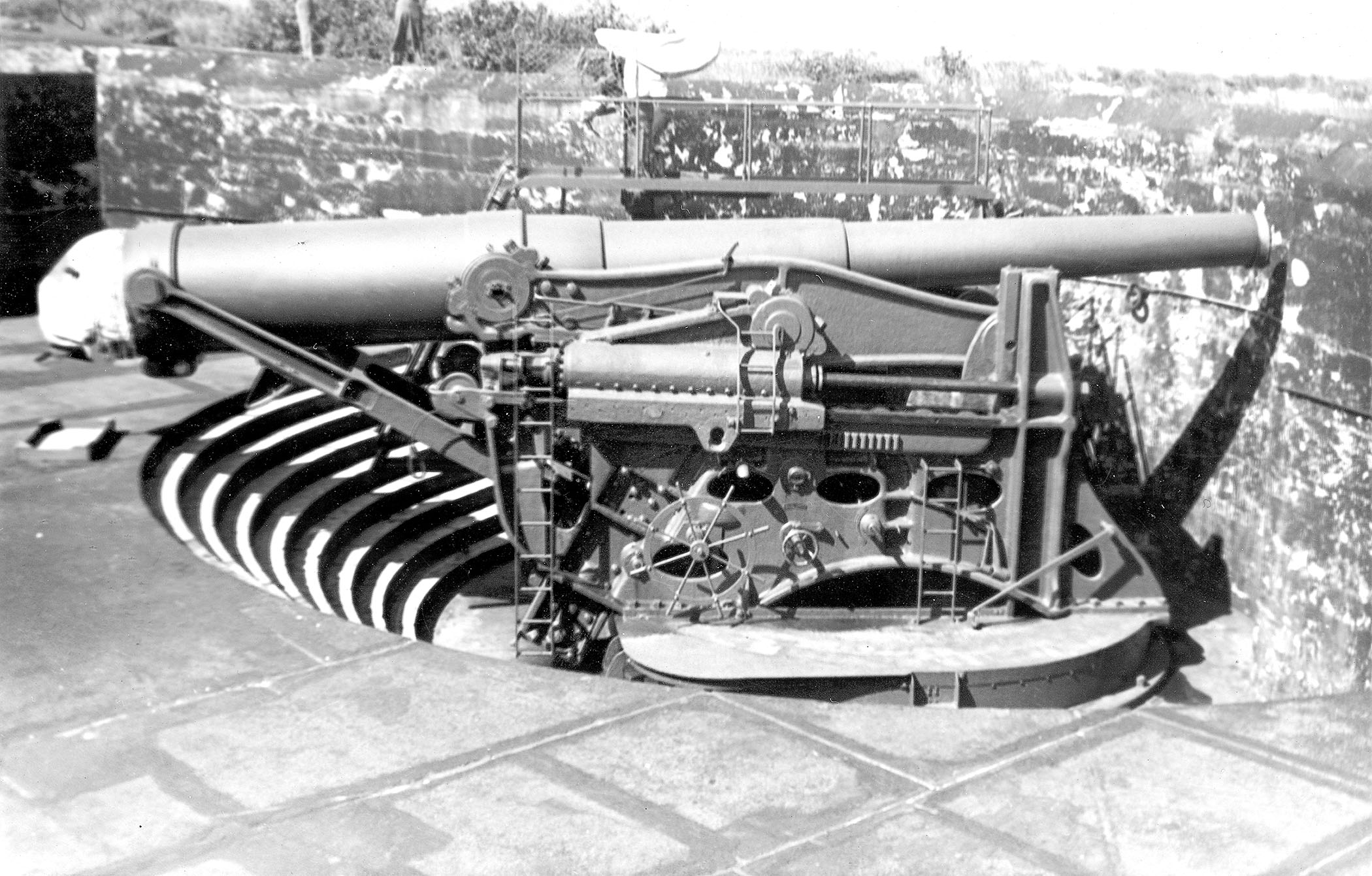
12-inch disappearing gun, similar to the biggest gun at Fort Armistead

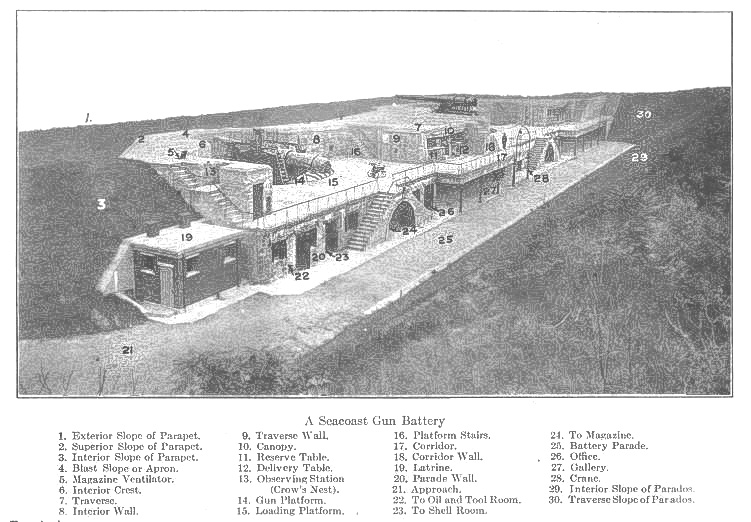
A US coast defense battery with two guns on disappearing carriages, similar to the batteries at Fort Armistead

Fort Armistead was a United States Army coastal defense fort, active from 1901 to 1920, that defended Baltimore, Maryland.

== History ==
Fort Armistead was built from 1897 to 1901 as part of the large-scale Endicott Program. Other forts of this era in the Coast Defenses of Baltimore include Fort Howard, Fort Carroll, and Fort Smallwood. Fort Armistead is in the Hawkins Point section of the city. The fort is named for Major George Armistead (1780–1818, later promoted to Colonel), commander of Fort McHenry during the Battle of Baltimore, the British Royal Navy attack in September 1814 in the War of 1812; the battle inspired the writing of the poem "Defence of Fort M'Henry" by Francis Scott Key which, later set to music as "The Star-Spangled Banner", became the American national anthem in 1931. The battle and bombardment has since been celebrated annually by the city, county, and state as Defenders Day.

Fort Armistead had four gun batteries: Battery Winchester with one 12-inch M1888 disappearing gun, Battery McFarland with three 8-inch M1888 disappearing guns, Battery Irons with two 4.72-inch 45 caliber Armstrong guns on pedestal mounts, and Battery Mudge with two 3-inch M1898 guns on masking parapet (retractable) mounts. Battery Winchester was named for James Winchester, a Maryland officer in the Revolutionary War and a general in the War of 1812. Battery McFarland was named for Daniel McFarland, an officer killed in the War of 1812. Battery Irons was named for Joseph Irons, killed in the Mexican–American War. Battery Mudge was named for Robert R. Mudge, killed in action against the Seminoles. The fort also included a mine casemate and command station to control a naval minefield in the harbor.

Battery Irons had been added to Fort Armistead as part of a series of measures to quickly deploy modern weapons to the East Coast after the outbreak of the Spanish–American War in 1898. The Endicott Program was still years from completion, and it was feared the Spanish fleet would bombard the U.S. Battery Irons was disarmed in 1913 and the guns sent to Fort Ruger in Hawaii.

After the American entry into World War I in April 1917, many guns were removed from coast defenses for potential service on the Western Front. Most of these weapons were not sent overseas or did not see action; however, most of the heavy guns in the Baltimore area were dismounted in 1917–18 and not returned to the forts. Battery McFarland's three 8-inch guns were removed in 1917 for potential use as railway artillery, while Battery Winchester's 12-inch gun was sent to Fort Wadsworth, Staten Island, New York to replace a gun sent to the railway artillery program. With the war over, in 1920 Fort Armistead's service came to a close; Battery Mudge's 3-inch guns were scrapped as part of a general withdrawal from service of the 3-inch M1898 gun type.

In World War II (1939/41–1945), the fort site was briefly reclaimed by the military and used by the United States Navy for ammunition storage. In 1952–54 a four-gun 90 mm anti-aircraft battery was stationed on site.

== Present ==
After World War I, the fort property was declared surplus and abandoned by the United States Department of War and the U.S. Army in 1923. Five years later it was turned over to the City of Baltimore's Department of Recreation and Parks (Bureau of Parks). It is now a Baltimore city park. In 1975–1977, the Hawkins Point area was impacted by the construction of the Outer Harbor Crossing carrying the Baltimore Beltway (Interstate 695) over the Patapsco Harbor. This was the Francis Scott Key Bridge, which used to tower over the 1890s-era seacoast defense site below, until its collapse due to the collision of the container ship Dali with the bridge on March 26, 2024.

== See also ==
- Seacoast defense in the United States
- United States Army Coast Artillery Corps
