= Fort Lyttelton Site =

Archaeological site in South Carolina, United States

- U.S. National Register of Historic Places
- Nearest city: Beaufort, South Carolina
- Area: less than one acre
- Built: 1781
- NRHP reference No.: 79003322
- Added to NRHP: September 13, 1979

The Fort Lyttelton Site, located in Beaufort County, South Carolina, is significant for its rich and layered artifacts and structural remains. These provide a composite view of land use since colonial times. In the 18th century and early into the 19th century, the land was primarily used for military purposes. In the late 19th century, the "phosphate period" followed the military period. Shipbuilding became important in the early 20th century. The Fort Lyttelton Site was listed in the National Register of Historic Places on September 13, 1979.
