= Arundel Cove Archaeological Site =

- U.S. National Register of Historic Places
- Location: Address restricted
- Nearest city: Baltimore, Maryland
- NRHP reference No.: 83002921
- Added to NRHP: July 21, 1983

Arundel Cove Archaeological Site is an archaeological site near Baltimore in Anne Arundel County, Maryland. It is situated on the south shore of Arundel Cove, a tributary of Curtis Creek which drains into the Patapsco River. The site was discovered during routine shovel test pitting of the U.S. Coast Guard Yard at Curtis Bay in 1981. The test pits revealed that the site is small in size, extending only 20 feet north–south by 15 feet east–west. It represents the remains of a prehistoric summer camp which apparently was not repeatedly occupied. It contains a prehistoric period storage pits, with evidence of the use of galium and wild black cherry.

It was listed on the National Register of Historic Places in 1983.
