= Stage Fort Park =

Coordinates: 42°36′20″N 70°40′41″W

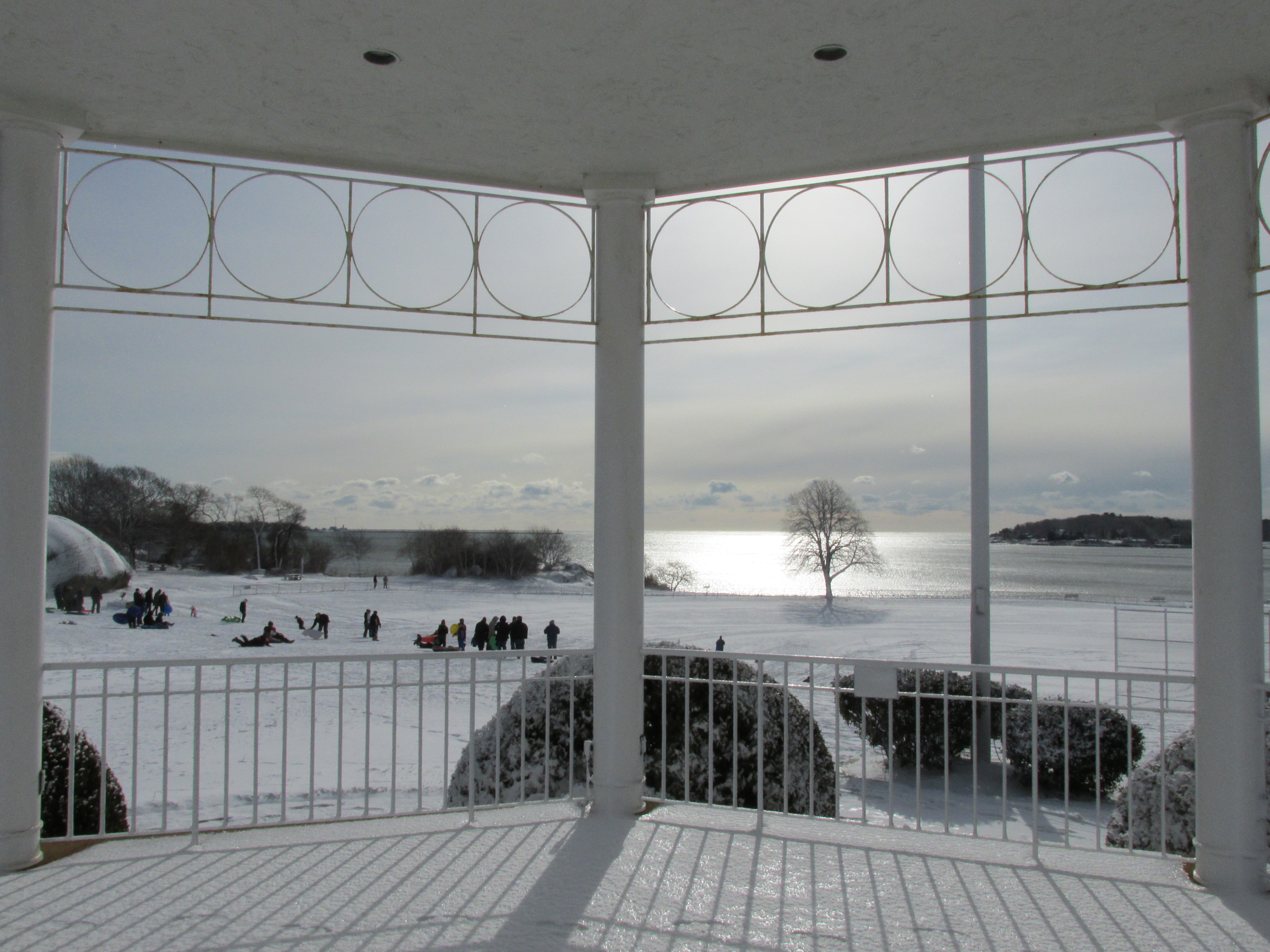
Stage Fort Park

Stage Fort Park is a park at Stage Head in Gloucester, Massachusetts, part of the Essex National Heritage Area. It contains two beaches, a large playground, picnic benches, two baseball fields, a basketball court, a dog park and plenty of room for any weekend activities. The park includes Gloucester's Visitor and Welcome Center and Stage Fort, a reconstructed Civil War fort on a site fortified since 1635.

A seasonal restaurant in the park, The Cupboard of Gloucester, selling a wide variety of food and ice cream including fried clams and sandwiches.

The most prominent geological feature is a large rock, some sixty feet high and two hundred wide. It was said to be an ancient ritual stone used by Native Americans.

Often referred to as "Tablet Rock" for the tablet installed into its face in 1907. It reads:

On this site in 1623
A company of fishermen and farmers from Dorchester Eng.
under the direction of Rev. John White founded
THE MASSACHUSETTS BAY COLONY

- - -
From that time the fisheries the oldest industry in the Commonwealth
have been uninterruptedly pursued from this port
- - -
Here in 1623 Gov. Roger Conant by wise diplomacy
averted bloodshed between contending factions
One led by Myles Standish of Plymouth
The other by Capt. Hewes
A notable exemplification of arbitration
in the beginnings of New England
- - -
Placed by the citizens of Gloucester 1907

Stage Head was named for a fishing "stage" dating back to the original settlement by the Dorchester Adventurers Company circa 1624. It was the most likely original site of Roger Conant's "Great House", which was moved to Salem circa 1628. The area was first fortified in 1635 with the Stage Fort and garrisoned intermittently from then until the Spanish–American War. The fort was reconstructed in 1930. The works were also known variously as Fort Gloucester, Eastern Point Fort, Fort Conant, other names, and other variants of these names.

An 1862 painting by Fitz Henry Lane, Stage Fort across Gloucester Harbor, depicts the park area and the fort from further north in the harbor. The painting is in the collection of the Metropolitan Museum of Art.

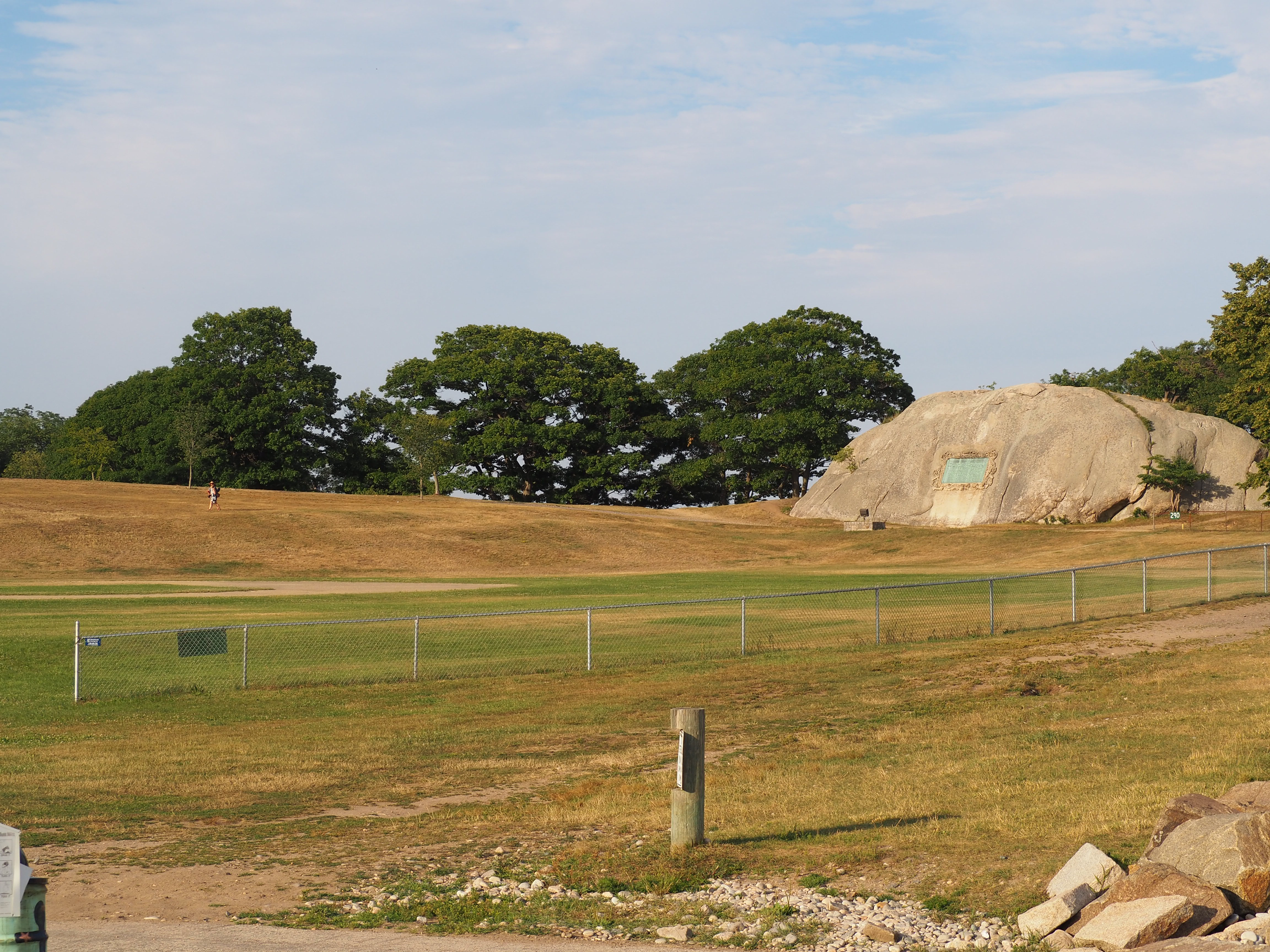
Another view of Stage Fort Park, featuring the giant rock

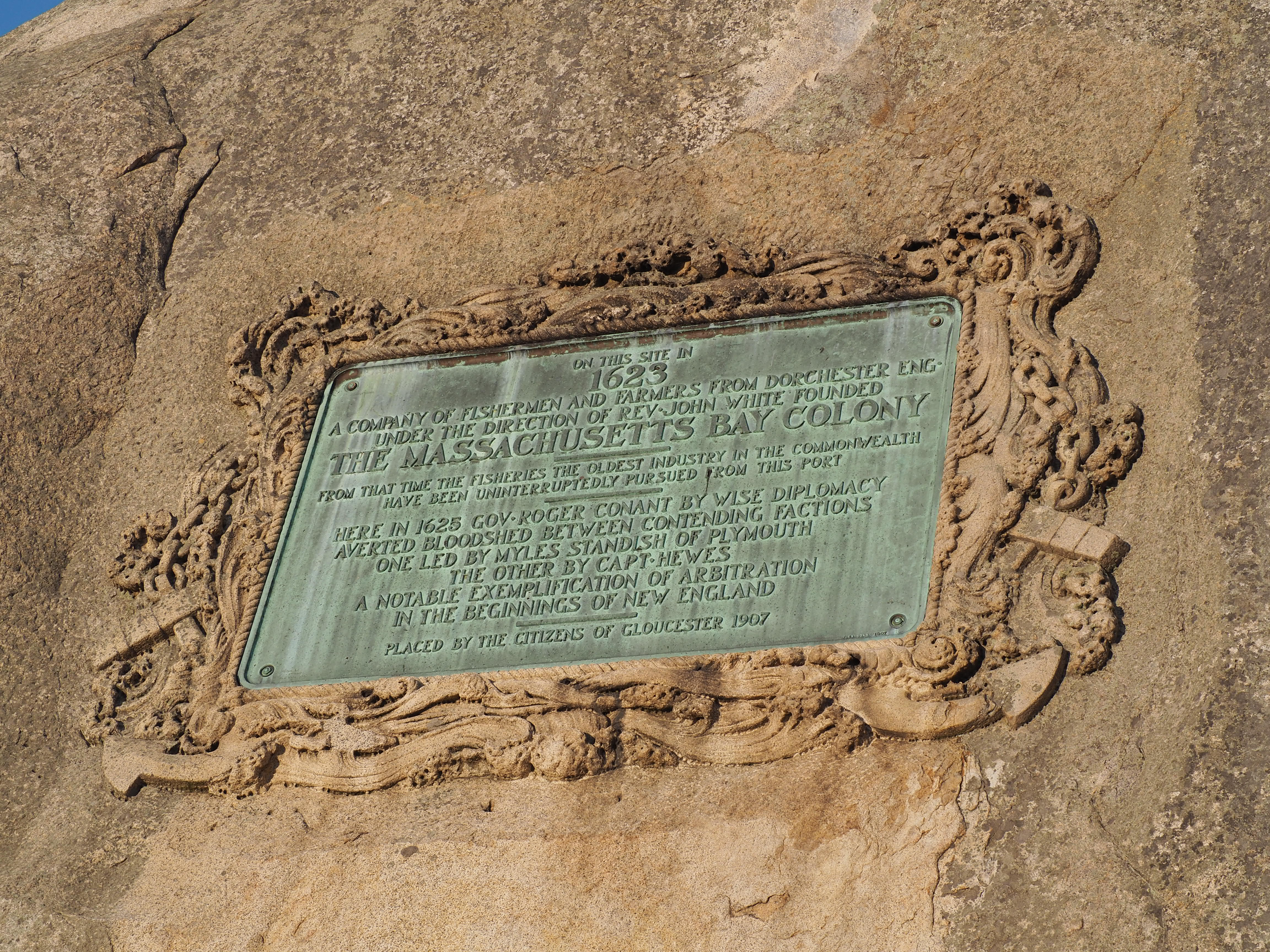
Plaque on the large rock

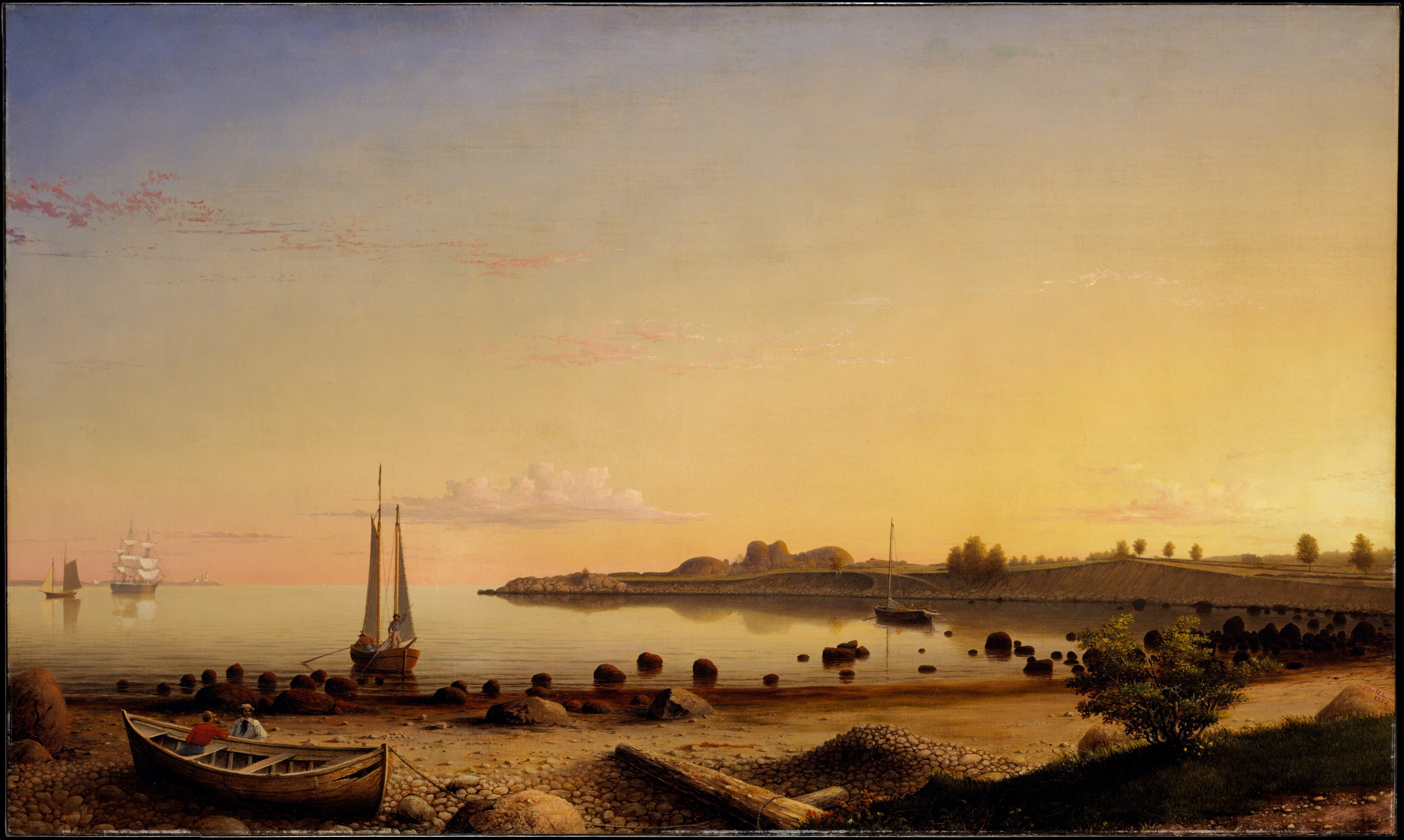
Stage Fort across Gloucester Harbor, Fitz Henry Lane, 1862
