= Craighill =

Craighill is a surname. Notable people with the surname include:

- Frank Craighill, one of the founding partners of the sports marketing firm ProServ
- John Millar, Lord Craighill (1817–1888), Scottish lawyer and judge
- Lloyd Craighill (1886–1971), American missionary to China, born in Lynchburg, Virginia
- Margaret D. Craighill (1898–1977), the first woman commissioned officer in the United States Army Medical Corps
- William Price Craighill (1833–1909), author, Union Army engineer in the American Civil War, and later served as Chief of Engineers

== See also ==
- Craighill Channel Lower Range Front Light, named for William Price Craighill, was the first caisson lighthouse built in the Chesapeake Bay in Maryland
- Craighill Channel Lower Range Rear Light, one of a pair of range lights that marks the first section of the shipping channel into Baltimore harbor
- Craighill Channel Upper Range Front Light, one of a pair of range lights that marks the second section of the shipping channel into Baltimore harbor
- Craighill Channel Upper Range Rear Light, one of a pair of range lights that marks the second section of the shipping channel into Baltimore harbor
