= Fort Howard =

Fort Howard may refer to:

- Fort Howard (Maryland), a former fort in Baltimore County
  - Fort Howard, Maryland, a community at the location of the fort
  - Fort Howard Veterans Hospital, a former hospital
- Fort Howard (Wisconsin), a 19th-century fort at Green Bay, Wisconsin
  - Fort Howard, Wisconsin, a former city in Brown County, Wisconsin that was annexed to the City of Green Bay
  - Fort Howard Paper Company, formerly headquartered in Green Bay, later absorbed into the Georgia-Pacific company
- Fort Howard (Missouri), a U.S. fort during the War of 1812 near the Battle of the Sink Hole on May 24, 1815
