= Port of Baltimore =

Cargo port in Baltimore, Maryland, US

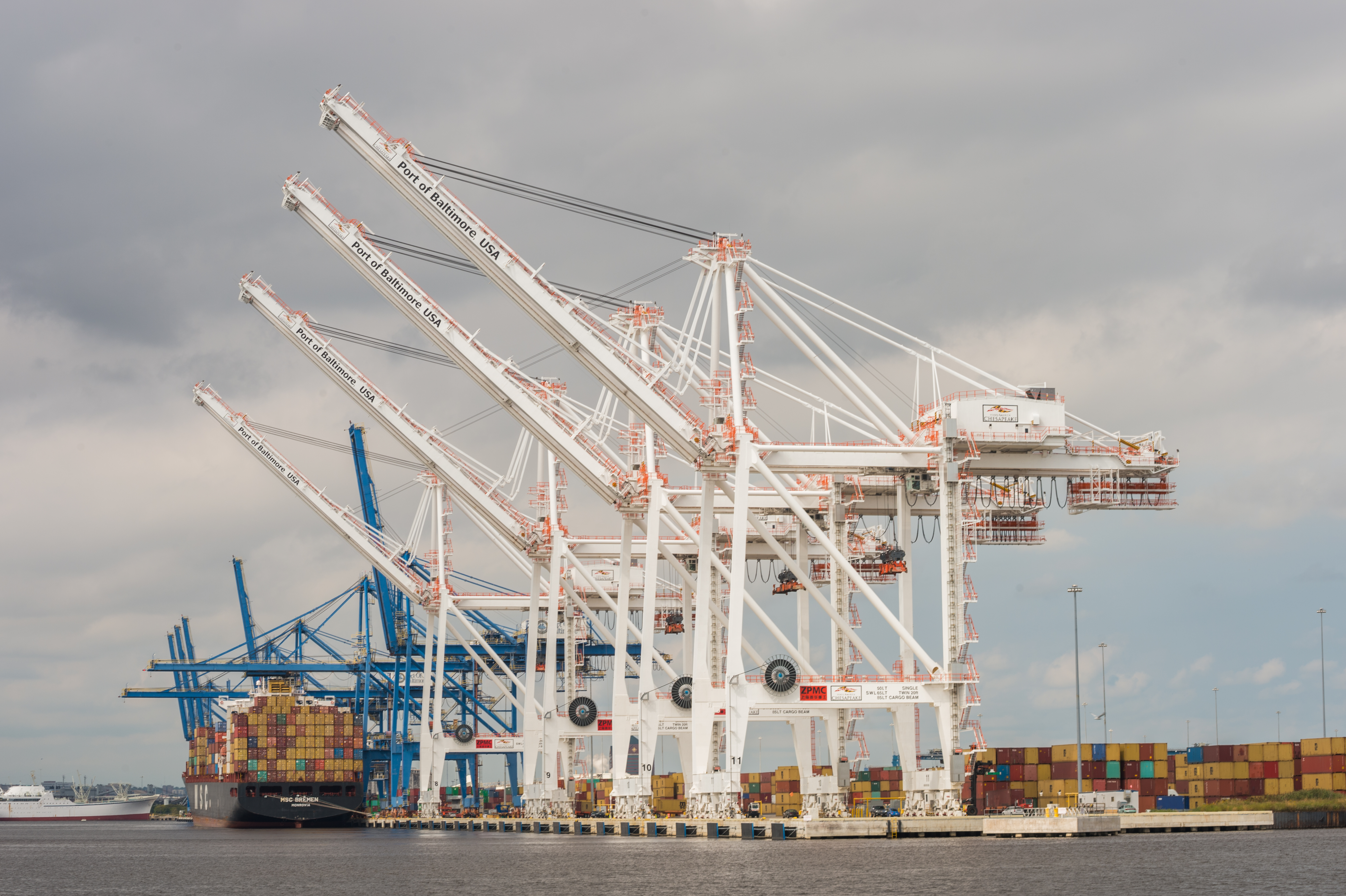
- Cargo loading cranes at the Seagirt and Dundalk Marine Terminals along the northeast shore of the Northwest Branch of the Patapsco River towards the Inner Harbor and downtown Baltimore
- Interactive map of Port of Baltimore

Location
- Coordinates: 39°16′30″N 76°35′06″W

Details
- Owned by: Maryland Port Administration
- Draft depth: 50 feet
- Air draft: 182 feet (Chesapeake Bay Bridge). Previously also restricted to 185 feet by the Francis Scott Key Bridge (1977-2024)

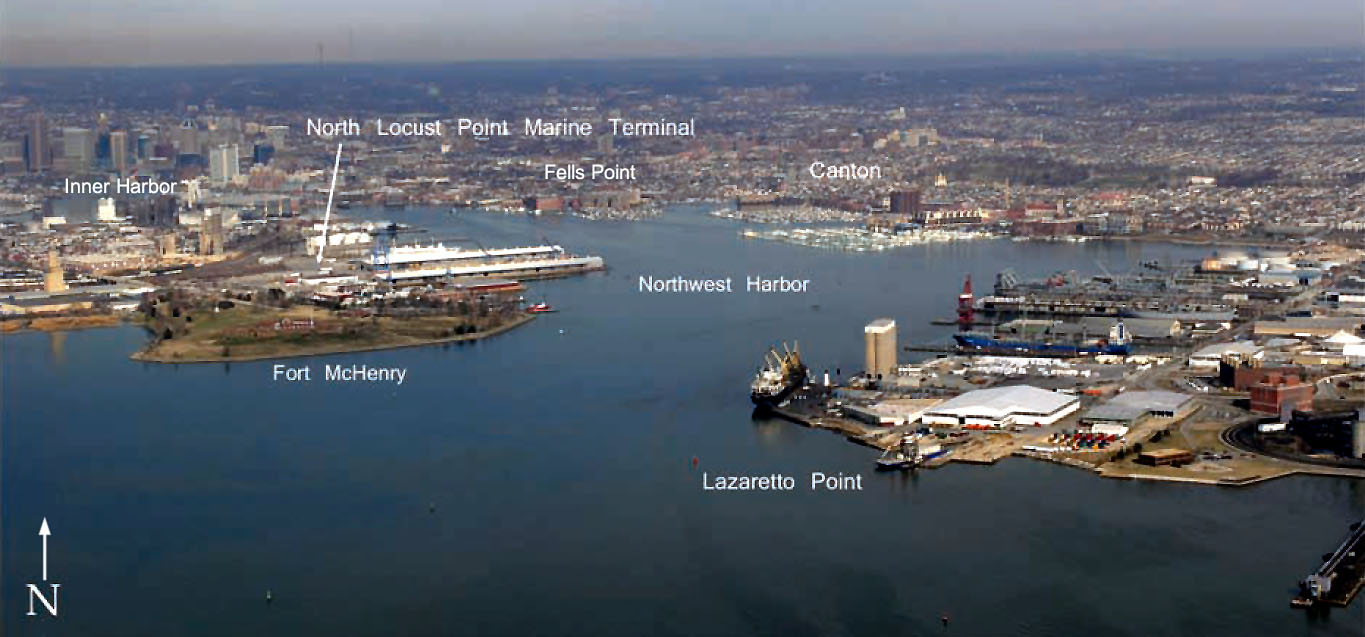
Aerial view – looking up the Northwest Branch of the Patapsco River towards the Inner Harbor and downtown Baltimore. Historic Fort McHenry from the War of 1812 is on Locust Point / Whetstone Point is at center left.

The Helen Delich Bentley Port of Baltimore is a shipping port along the tidal basins of the three branches of the Patapsco River in Baltimore, Maryland, on the upper northwest shore of the Chesapeake Bay. It is the nation's largest port facility for specialized cargo (roll-on/roll-off ships) and passenger facilities. It is operated by the Maryland Port Administration (MPA), a unit of the Maryland Department of Transportation.

Founded in 1706, the port was renamed in 2006 for Helen Delich Bentley (1923–2016), who represented Baltimore as a U.S. representative for a decade and who had also been a maritime reporter and editor for The Baltimore Sun daily newspaper.

== History ==
In 1608, Captain John Smith traveled 170 miles (270 km) from Jamestown (established the previous year) exploring the shores, rivers, creeks, and streams to the upper Chesapeake Bay towards the Susquehanna River, leading the first European expedition to the Patapsco River, named after the native Algonquian peoples who fished shellfish and hunted.

English royal and proprietary land grants from 1661 were combined in 1702 by James Carroll, who named it Whetstone Point because of the landform shape resembling a sharpening stone. The area is now known as Locust Point, a residential and industrial area. The port was founded on this site in 1706 by the provincial Maryland General Assembly, which designated it one of the official Port of Entry for the tobacco trade with the Kingdom of England. In 1729–1730, Baltimore was established by Act of Assembly to the northwest at "The Basin" of the Northwest Branch of the Patapsco. This area was later known as the Inner Harbor.

In 1776, local citizenry erected earthworks for port defense during the American Revolutionary War known as Fort Whetstone. These port fortifications were replaced beginning in 1798. In addition, Fort McHenry was expanded and reconstructed with brick and stone in a "star fort" shape. This work was conducted by the officers and engineers of the United States Army and its Corps of Engineers and the U.S. Department of War.

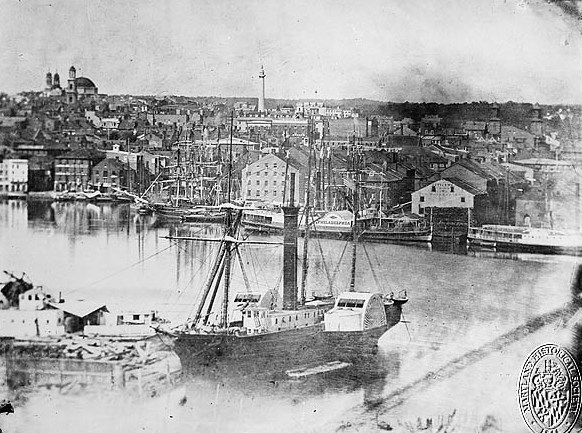
Looking north at growing City of Baltimore at "The Basin" (later Inner Harbor) of the Northwest Branch of the Patapsco River, with an early steamship with side paddlewheel docked below the heights of Federal Hill in 1849 with the Old Baltimore Cathedral (later Basilica of the Assumption of Mary) (to the left) and the Washington Monument (center) in the distance dominating the city.

Fells Point, first named Long Island Point in 1670, is the deepest point in the natural harbor on the north shore of the Northwest Branch of the Patapsco. It soon became the colony's main shipbuilding center, with many shipyards, famed for the construction of the unique styled Baltimore clipper smaller-sized sailing schooners. These were notorious as commerce raiders, and privateers used them. This type of activity led to the British attack in September 1814, during the War of 1812 known as the Battle of Baltimore. It is noted for the famous bombardment of Fort McHenry as well as a land attack to the southeast at the Battle of North Point, which attacked fortifications on the east side of town at Loudenschlager's and Potter's Hills (today's Hampstead Hill/Patterson Park). Fells Point was incorporated into old Baltimore Town in 1773. The Continental Navy ordered their first frigate warship, USS Virginia, from George Wells at Fells Point in 1775. The first ship named the U.S.F Constellation was produced at the Harris Creek shipyard east of Fells Point (the site of the future neighborhood of Canton) by a master shipwright from Hingham, Massachusetts named David Stodder. The third USS Enterprise was built at Henry Spencer's shipyard. Over 800 ships were commissioned from Fells Point shipyards from 1784 to 1821. The California Gold Rush of 1848–1849 led to many orders for fast vessels. Many overland pioneers also relied upon canned goods supplied from Baltimore factories.

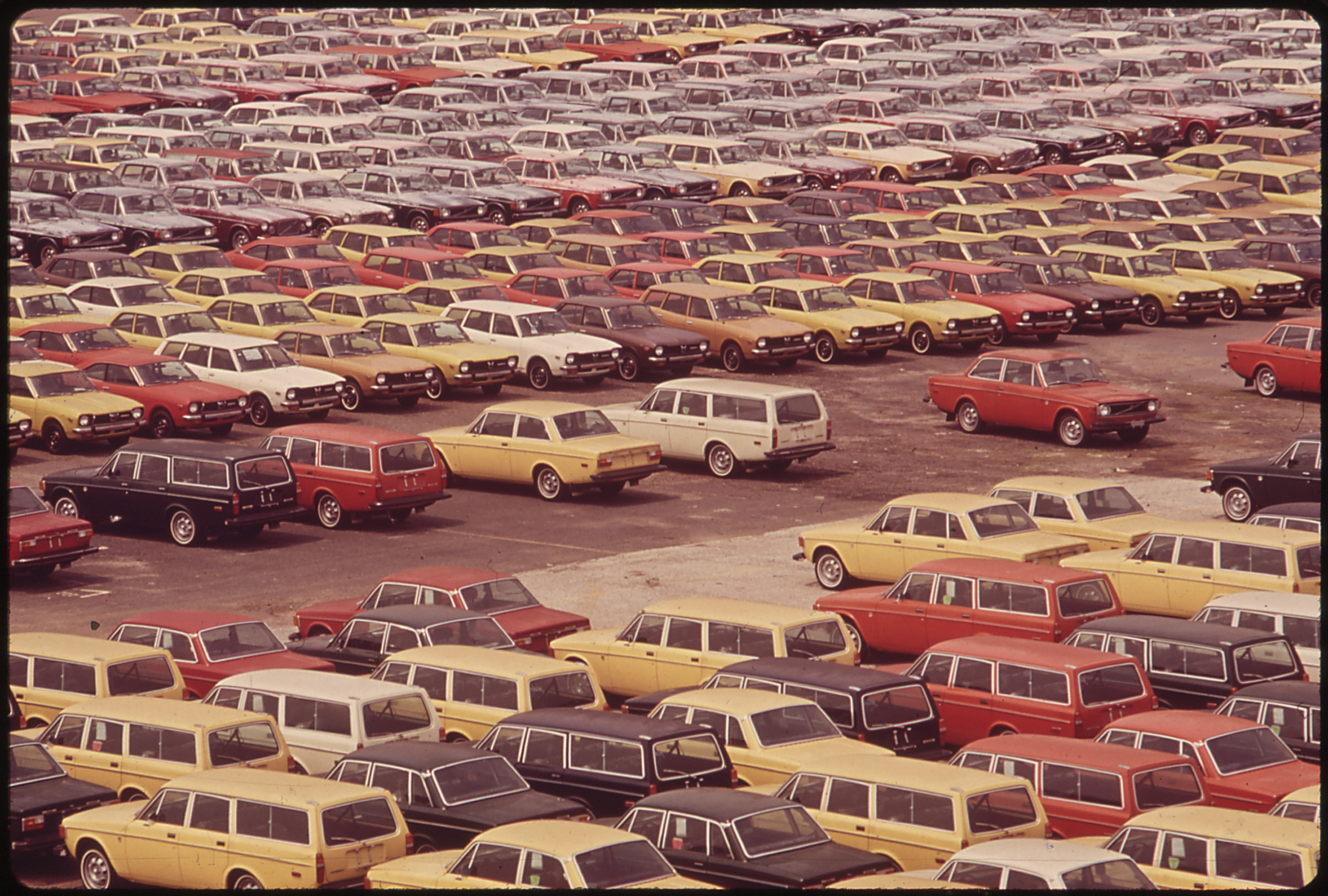
New cars waiting for shipment, 1973

After Baltimore's founding, the waterfront developed into drydocks, warehouses, ship chandlers, and industry, including mills, which were built behind the wharves. In what is now Canton, further southeast of Baltimore and Fells Point along the Patapsco River, John O'Donnell's plantation was developed in the early 1800s for worker housing and industry, including the Canton Iron Works owned by Peter Cooper and later Horace Abbott during the Civil War and others.

The tracks of the Baltimore and Ohio Railroad (B&O) reached Locust Point in 1845. The arrival of B&O and other railroads made the port a central transshipment point between inland points and the rest of the world. By the 1840s, the Baltimore Steam Packet Company ("Old Bay Line") was providing overnight steamship service down the Chesapeake Bay. After the Civil War, coffee ships were designed here for trade with Brazil. Other industrial activities in Canton included Baltimore Copper Smelting Company and small oil refineries, later purchased by Standard Oil. By the end of the nineteenth century, European ship lines had terminals for emigrants from Britain, Ireland, Germany, and Poland.

On March 26, 2024, the container ship MV Dali struck a support pier of the Francis Scott Key Bridge, causing the bridge to collapse into the Patapsco River and blocking the main shipping channel into the Port of Baltimore for about 11 weeks.

=== Harbor channels and approaches ===
Maintenance of harbor channels and navigation aids began early. Dredging in the harbor can be traced back as far as 1783, when the Ellicott brothers (of Ellicott Dredges) excavated the bottom at their wharf in the Inner Harbor. In 1790, the state government began systematic dredging using a "mud machine", which used a horse-drawn drag bucket, later upgraded with steam power. In 1825, Sen. Sam Smith of Maryland petitioned Congress for federal funding for this work.

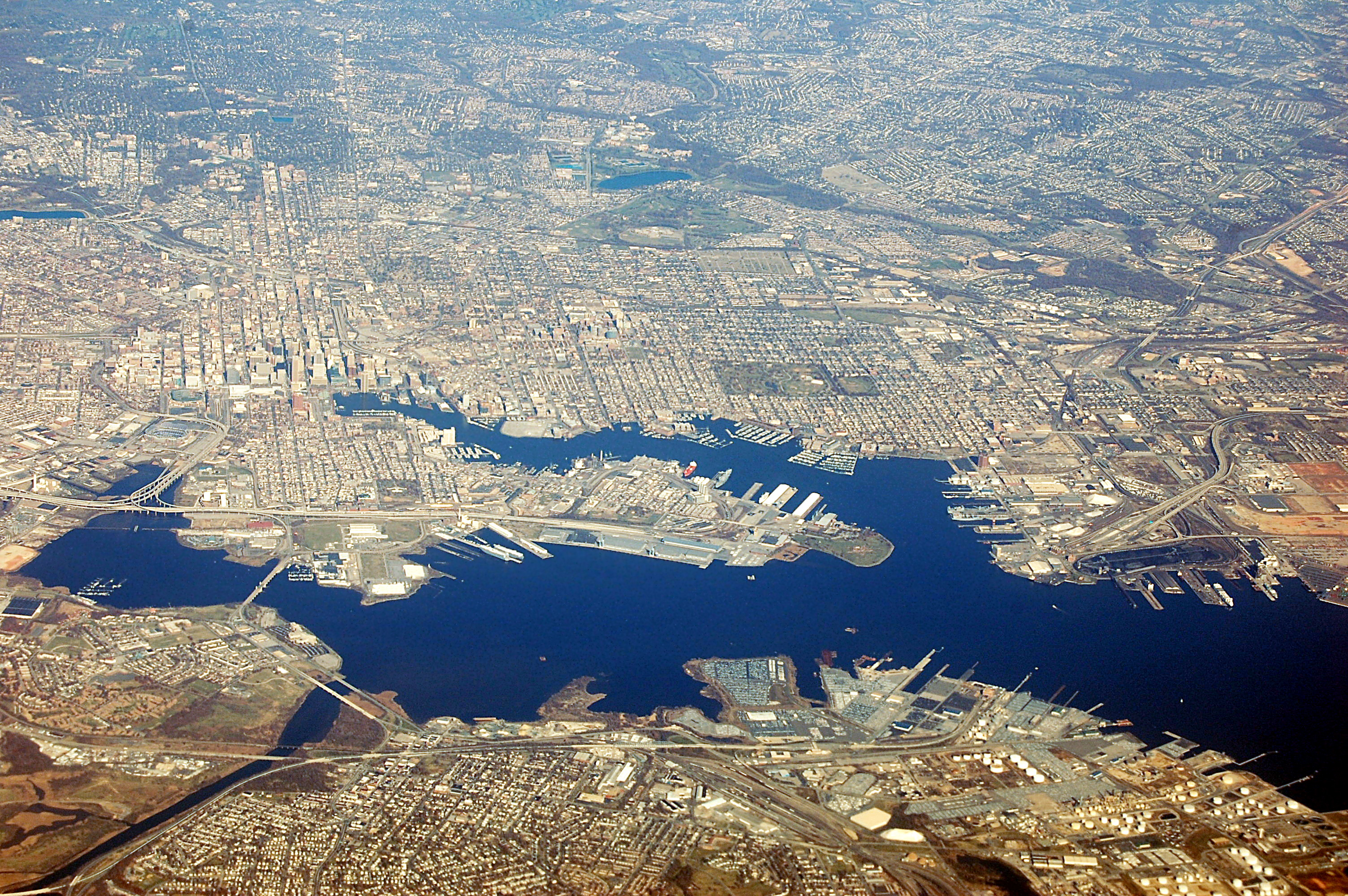
Aerial view of the port

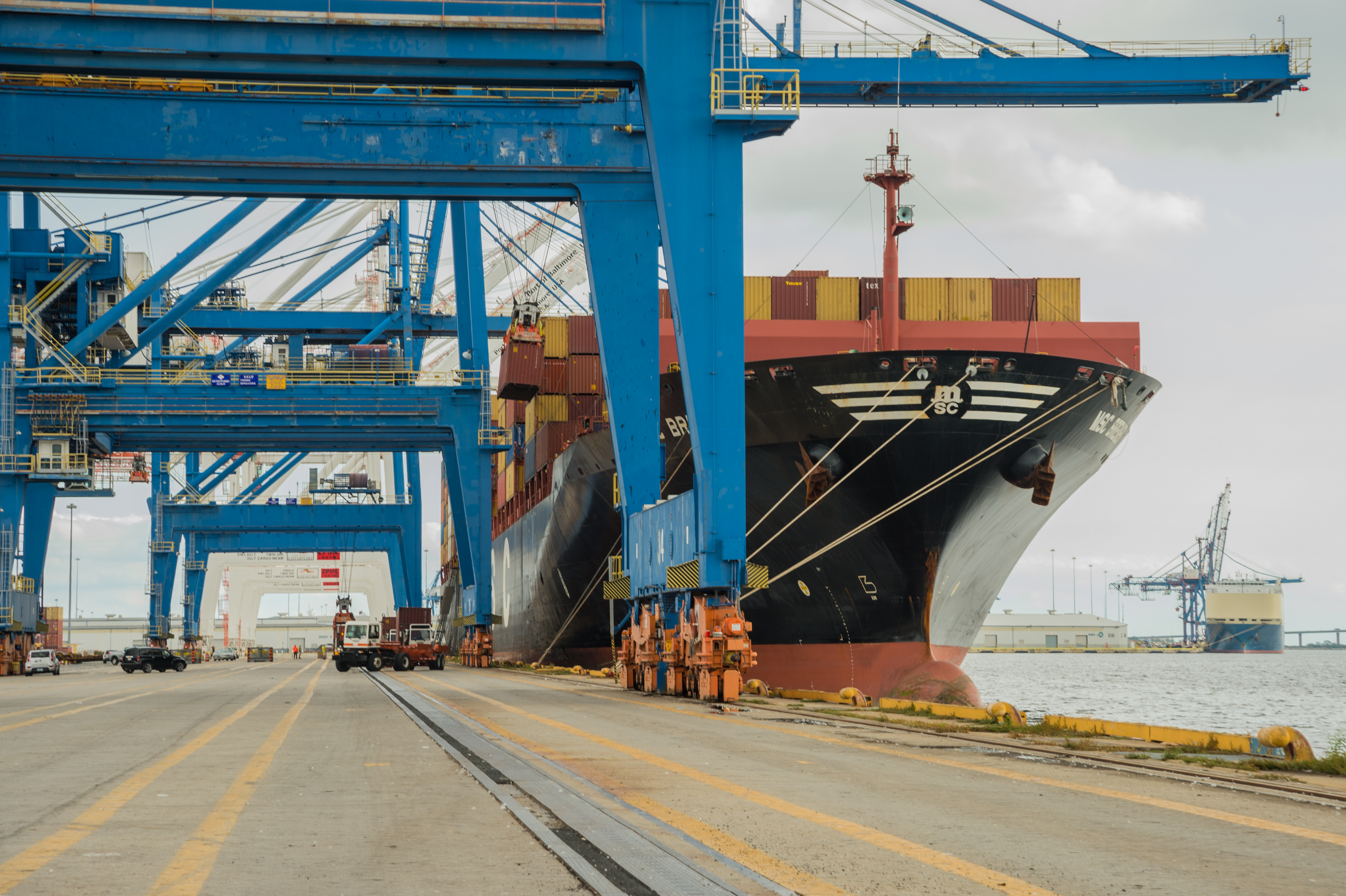
Port of Baltimore, 2014

At this time, Congress was smarting from the incursions of the War of 1812 and had determined to expand naval defenses. In Baltimore, it led to the misconceived construction of Fort Carroll, an island three-tiered brick fortification in the 1840s (similar to various other East Coast island forts built such as the famous Fort Sumter in Charleston harbor, South Carolina), supervised by young Col. Robert E. Lee of the United States Army Corps of Engineers but federal dredging appropriations preceded that project, beginning in 1830. This first project was completed in 1838. In the 1850s, a second dredging project was undertaken under Capt. Henry Brewerton, who was also later in charge of the Fort Carroll project. He excavated a straight channel from Sparrows Point out to the mouth of the Patapsco near Seven Foot Knoll Light between North Point and Hawkins Point, which was erected in 1855; this channel, known today as the Brewerton Channel, continues to be the central link in the path into the harbor.

In 1865, Maj. William Price Craighill took over as Baltimore District Engineer of the Corps of Engineers. His initial survey of the Brewerton Channel disclosed severe shoaling at the mouth of the river. He excavated a new channel starting from the older channel at a point just northwest of Seven Foot Knoll and running south to the mouth of the Magothy River, where it turned to the south-southeast and continued to Sandy Point, just north of the present location of the Chesapeake Bay Bridge. In the 1870s, a cutoff channel was dug to ameliorate the turn between the old and new channels; the Brewerton Channel was also extended to provide a connection to the Chesapeake and Delaware Canal. Enlarged and extended to access various facilities within the port, the Brewerton and Craighill Channels continue to be used to the present, essentially unaltered in configuration.

Federal lighthouse construction in the bay began in the 1820s, and one early project was the erecting of range lights to guide ships into the Patapsco. The North Point Range Lights were lit in 1822, marking a path roughly the same as that of the current Craighill Cutoff Channel. Subsequent channel construction was followed shortly by light projects. Brewerton's channel was marked by the Hawkins Point and Leading Point lights, constructed in 1868 and converted to skeleton towers in 1924. The original (lower) Craighill Channel was marked with range lights in 1875, following two years of temporary lightships; the cutoff was marked with the upper range lights in 1886, replacing the North Point range, which had been discontinued in 1873. In later years, a pair of skeleton towers were erected on Locust Point to mark the Fort McHenry Channel, the final leg from the end of the Brewerton Channel to Curtis Point and the Inner Harbor. These lights remain in use, though they have all been automated. The Craighill Channel Lower Range Rear Light is the tallest lighthouse in Maryland.

In 2006, then-Maryland Governor Bob Ehrlich participated in naming the port after Helen Delich Bentley during the 300th anniversary of the port.

== Operations ==
The port has container cranes, roll-on/roll-off ramps, and bulk facilities, especially for steel.

From 2014 to 2017, the Port of Baltimore was the fourth fastest-growing port in North America. In 2017, it ranked 8th of 36 US ports for gross tonnage and 7th in dollar value. It handled 9.8% more cargo than the previous year; in the third quarter, it handled 15% more than the same quarter in the previous year. The port handled around 700,000 vehicles annually, including (as of 2004) most Mercedes-Benz cars imported into the U.S.

In 2019, the port handled 43.6 million short tons (38.9 million long tons; 39.6 million metric tons) in foreign commerce (imports and exports), valued at $58.4 billion. In 2019, the Port of Baltimore ranked 11th of 36 US ports in handling foreign tonnage and 9th in dollar value of the cargo handled.

In 2024, the port's public and private marine terminals handled 45.9 million tons of cargo, its second-highest annual total, worth a total of $62.2 billion. It processed more than 25.5 million tons from July to December, reflecting a strong recovery from the Key Bridge collapse disruption.

The Port handles one-fourth of the country's coal exports.

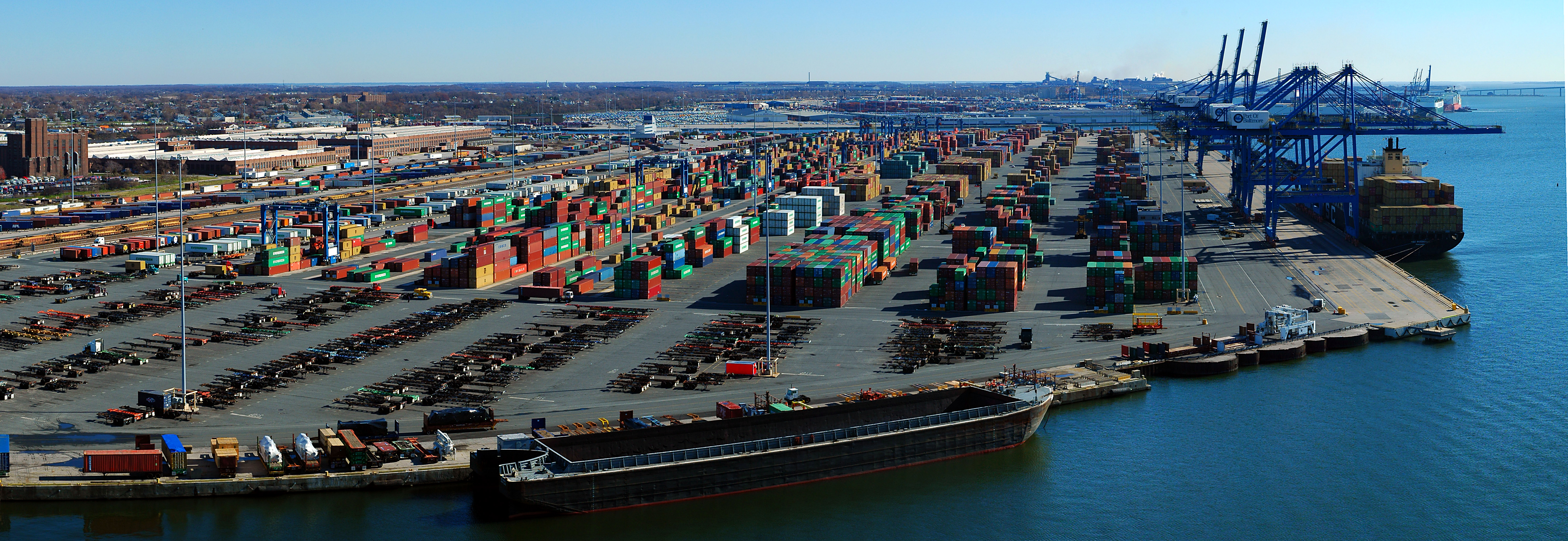
Seagirt Terminal

== Facilities ==
Port of Baltimore terminal locations
1 Dundalk Marine Terminal
2 Seagirt Marine Terminal
3 Fairfield Marine Automobile Terminal
4 North Locust Point
5 South Locust Point

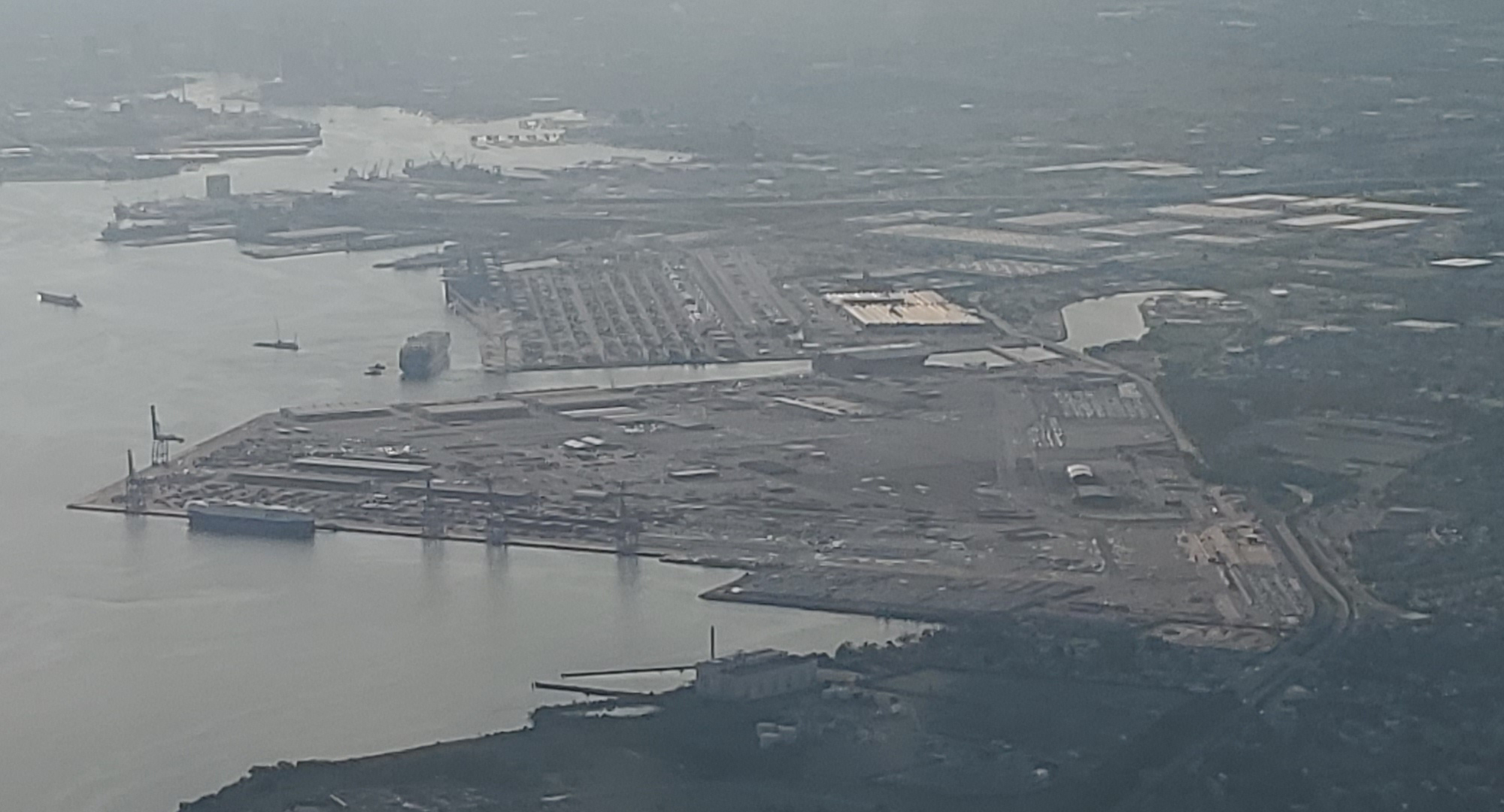
Dundalk and Seagirt Marine Terminals

The Port of Baltimore includes five terminal areas, which are located in the Maritime Industrial Zoning Overlay District:

- Dundalk Marine Terminal. This facility handles containers, break-bulk, wood pulp, Ro/Ro, autos, project cargo, and farm and construction equipment on 13 berths. The draft is 34 ft. (10.4 m) at four berths, 42 ft. (12.8 m) at seven berths, and 50 ft. (13.7 m) at two berths. The 570-acre (231 ha) facility features 790,000-square-foot (73,393 m^{2}) of inside storage in 10 sheds and 61-acre (25 ha) of open container storage, 20.1-acre (8 ha) of open break-bulk storage, 225-acre (91 ha) of open automobile storage; and 93-acre (38 ha) of open Ro/Ro storage.
- Seagirt Marine Terminal. This facility handles containers on four berths. Draft is 45 ft. (13.7 m) at three berths and 50ft. (15.2 m) at the other berth. The 284-acre (115 ha) facility features eight super post-Panamax cranes and seven post-Panamax cranes, 22 rubber-tired gantry cranes, and has 134-acre (54 ha) of outside storage.
- Fairfield Marine Automobile Terminal. This facility handles Ro/Ro and autos on two berths. Draft is 49 ft. (14.9 m) at one berth and 23 ft. (8.5 m) at the other. The facility features 61-acre (25 ha) of auto processing buildings.
- North Locust Point. This facility handles wood pulp, lumber, latex, steel, paper, and containers on five finger piers with drafts of 34 ft. (10.4 m). The facility features 180,000-square-foot (16,723 m^{2}) of inside storage and 19-acre (8 ha) of open storage.
- South Locust Point. This facility handles forest products on three general cargo berths with drafts of 36 ft. (11 m). The 79-acre (32 ha) facility features 935,000-square-foot (86,864 m^{2}) of inside storage.

== In popular culture ==
In the 1996 action film Eraser, the final battle takes place on and around a Russian cargo ship in the Port of Baltimore, referred to in the movie as the "Baltimore Docks".

The port appeared in the 2002 thriller The Sum of All Fears.

The second season of the HBO series The Wire centers around activity at the port.

In the first season of the Amazon Prime series Jack Ryan, the antagonists smuggle Cesium-137 into the port.

== See also ==
- United States container ports
- Baltimore Insular Line
