= Craighill Channel Upper Range Front Light =

Lighthouse in Maryland, United States

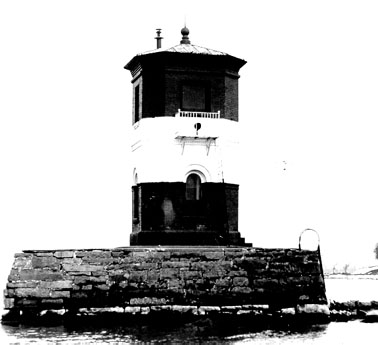
- undated photograph of the Craighill Channel Upper Range Front Light (USCG)
- Location: West of Fort Howard (North Point) on the north shore of the Patapsco River
- Coordinates: 39.1971°N 76.4482°W

Tower
- Foundation: stone
- Construction: brick
- Automated: 1929
- Height: 15 feet (4.6 m)
- Shape: square tower
- Heritage: National Register of Historic Places listed place

Light
- First lit: 1886
- Focal height: 4.5 m (15 ft)
- Characteristic: Fixed red (originally white)
- Cut-Off Channel Range Front Light Station
- U.S. National Register of Historic Places
- Nearest city: Fort Howard, Maryland
- Area: less than one acre
- Built: 1886
- MPS: Light Stations of the United States MPS
- NRHP reference No.: 02001415
- Added to NRHP: December 2, 2002

The Craighill Channel Upper Range Front Light is one of a pair of range lights that marks the second section of the shipping channel into Baltimore harbor.

== History ==
Work on the upper range lights commenced in 1885 and was completed in time to allow activation in January 1886. An initial plan to reuse the west North Point Range Light was discarded in favor of a tiny brick structure constructed on the foundation of the old light. The keeper's house was built on the shore, and a long wooden bridge allowed access to the light itself. Initially a locomotive headlight was installed to show a fixed white light.

Three years after improvements to the keeper's house were made in 1890, the bridge to the light was destroyed by a storm. Rather than rebuild it, the headlight was moved to the exterior of the light, and the keeper took up residence in the light itself. The light was electrified and automated in 1929. Although there are some claims that the light was rebuilt in 1938, this is believed to be a misunderstanding based on discrepancies in the reported height of the light over the years.
