= North Point Range Lights =

Lighthouse in Maryland, United States

- Location: Off Fort Howard (North Point) on the north shore of the Patapsco River
- Coordinates: 39.1971°N 76.4482°W (west light); 39.1940°N 76.4419°W (east light)

Tower
- Foundation: stone
- Construction: stone
- Height: 34 feet (10 m) (front); 40 feet (12 m) (rear)
- Shape: conical towers

Light
- First lit: 1822
- Deactivated: 1873
- Lens: sixth-order Fresnel lens
- Characteristic: Fixed white

The North Point Range Lights were some of the earliest lights in the Maryland portion of the Chesapeake Bay. Intended to guide ships headed for Baltimore harbor into the Patapsco River, they were superseded by channel construction in the 1870s and 1980s, and were replaced by the Craighill Channel Upper Range front and rear lights.

== History ==
Benjamin Latrobe submitted drawings for these lights before his death in 1820, but the range was not erected until 1822. Both houses stood in shallow water off North Point, with footbridges connecting them to the shore. A single keeper served both lights, and he was paid nearly double the usual amount for his services. The construction of the lights was apparently substandard, and in 1830 John Donahoo was called upon to repair and shore them up.

When they were constructed, no ship channel had yet been dredged in the Patapsco, though some dredging had been performed in the Inner Harbor area. In the 1850s the Brewerton Channel was constructed, but it headed straight out of the harbor to the mouth of the river. Therefore, the range lights never marked a specific channel. Complaints about the visibility and usefulness of the lights were common.

In the 1870s the construction of the main Craighill Channel made the lights obsolete, since it ran in a different direction and had its own range lights. Therefore, the North Point lights were abandoned in 1873. When the Craighill Channel Cutoff was constructed in the 1880s, it was initially planned to adapt the North Point west light as the front light for a range for the new channel. The old light proved unsatisfactory, however, and it was torn down; its foundation was preserved and used for the new Craighill Channel Upper Range Front Light. The new rear light was placed at a completely different location on Sparrows Point. The foundation of the east light remains, charted as an obstruction but otherwise unmarked.
