= Gary Stevenson =

Gary Stevenson may refer to:

- Gary E. Stevenson (born 1955), American LDS church leader
- Gary R. Stevenson (born 1956/1957), American sports marketing executive
- Gary Stevenson (campaigner) (born 1986), British YouTuber
