= Maritime Industrial Zoning Overlay District =

Coordinates: 39°16′N 76°34′W

The Maritime Industrial Zoning Overlay District (MIZOD) was created in Baltimore, Maryland in 2004 to preserve deepwater access for port and maritime industrial uses. As waterfront residential and commercial development encroached on maritime industrial uses within the city, waterfront industries were finding it harder to receive loans from banks to upgrade and expand their operations. MIZOD is a zoning district overlaid across existing industrial zones along the water to allow only industries that use or need deep water access. The Overlay district was set to expire in 2014, but was recently extended to expire in 2024.

== History and Enactment ==
Baltimore, Maryland's port came in danger of withering into obscurity due to practically unrestrained development of the waterfront by commercial and residential developers. The development of Harborplace on the Downtown Baltimore waterfront in 1980 near the then vacant Inner Harbor steamship docks was the harbinger of commercial and residential waterfront development on industrial lands in Baltimore. The 1990s and 2000s lead to rapid development and reuse of industrial buildings, including Tide Point, the reuse of a soap manufacturer into offices and Silo Point, which converted an unused grain silo into a high rise condominium development These projects were important in the development of the Marine Industrial Overlay District (MIZOD) in 2004 to limit the use of land in the district to uses served by the deep water ports. This included forbidding Planned Unit Developments (PUD), the reuse of industrial properties to mixed use developments and disallowed office and hotel uses from conditional use in the zoning laws. The City of Baltimore wrote the following in the legislative file which enacted MIZOD:

“The Maritime Industrial Overlay District is designed to ensure the preservation of limited deep water frontage of the Port of Baltimore for maritime use. The intent is to delineate an area where maritime shipping can be conducted without the intrusion of non-industrial uses and where investment in maritime infrastructure is encouraged.”

Baltimore had been experiencing rapid growth on the waterfront and planners feared that much of the infrastructure that supported the Port of Baltimore would be removed to allow for further waterfront gentrification. Once this infrastructure was removed it would be either impossible or very expensive to replace including both property with deep water access and railway and truck routes that support them. While MIZOD was created to protect industries around the harbor and port facilities relying on deep water access, the intended effect was to incubate manufacturing growth in the entire city and region. Many manufacturing firms outside of the MIZOD boundaries rely on the proximity to an international and national transportation hub. Baltimore is in a unique position to take advantage of international events, the expansion of the Panama Canal due to be completed in 2014 will open the East Coast to much larger ships called “Mega Ships” or Panamax ships. The canal will allow for ships a quarter of a mile long that can accommodate 14,000 shipping containers as opposed to the ships that carry 4,500 containers that can currently pass through the canal. Baltimore is currently in a position to take advantage of much of this new traffic due to the lack of infrastructure in larger East Coast ports. The channels that serve Savannah and Charleston are too shallow to accommodate the deeper drafts of the ships and the Bayonne Bridge blocks access to Newark by these larger ships. This will put Baltimore in a position to share the opportunity of “Mega Ship” traffic with only a few other East Coast ports.

Industrial protection is needed both out of necessity to protect industries from encroaching non-compatible uses and to preserve high-wage, low education jobs. The encroachment of commercial and residential uses on industrial land makes banks very cautious about lending money to marine and industrial companies in areas where non-compatible uses are developed in the surrounding areas. Banks understand the power and political persuasion residents have once they move into or near an industrial area. The traffic and noise created by early morning and late night shifts and shipping lead to complaints to the city and eventually the lobbying efforts by residents lead to restrictions on industrial properties and activities which puts the productivity, profit and viability of an industrial company in jeopardy. A University of Wisconsin report on planned manufacturing districts used the phrase “industrial displacement” to describe the process of non-compatible uses forcing industry out of areas, especially those around the central core of a city.

== Resistance to MIZOD ==
Maritime Industrial Zoning Overlay Districts met resistance and brought up many concerns over trying to protect industrial lands. Baltimore was experiencing declines in manufacturing and port traffic, one reason why the industrial properties were experiencing such pressure from gentrification was that there were many vacant buildings to be converted to other uses. Many argued that preserving industry was not the “highest and best use” for the land, residential and commercial development could turn underutilized, low tax value properties into tax producing developments . The concern of vacant buildings remaining unused would further deteriorate the neighborhoods, thirty percent of all land in Baltimore is used for industry, of that land 13.5% remains vacant. There is still a relatively high vacancy rate in the MIZOD and the owners of that land are now unable to sell that land to residential, commercial or even some industrial developers. This land is likely to remain vacant with no reimbursement of missed opportunity costs and the inability to sell or develop the land drops the property values of these lots. Developers in Baltimore were especially resistant to the MIZOD since redevelopment and adaptive reuse projects such as Silo Point and Tide Point were such successes. Many manufacturing company owners were against the creation of MIZOD, arguing that if their buildings became too small, old or obsolete, the properties would be difficult to sell if they needed to move to a larger or more advanced property.

== Effects of MIZOD ==
Baltimore realized that the loss of maritime industrial land would impede on their ability to attract port traffic. The creation of MIZOD and the security it has given to maritime industry, the continued dredging of shipping lanes and the impending expansion of the Panama Canal has spurred a lot of private investment. Banks are now more comfortable to loan to the industrial operations in the areas covered by the MIZOD and within two years of MIZOD's implementation, there has been millions of dollars spent on improvements to piers and the additions of production lines in the maritime based industries. According to the Baltimore Development Corporation's 2007 annual report; among the large companies in the Port of Baltimore under MIZOD protection that have expanded or plan to expand operations are: CSX Railroads, which operates coal and raw materials piers have spent $19 million on pier repairs and shop improvements; Domino Sugar has relocated threatened operations in New York and Louisiana to Baltimore adding employees, an additional 1.5 million dollar production line and are considering adding more production lines, warehouses and a research and development facility; Maryland Port Authority which has added a $26.4 million cruise terminal and completed the North American Paper Terminal and Rukert Terminals Corporation, which just built a new 1000 foot “state of the art” 50 foot deep draft pier for $25 million. In November 2009, the state of Maryland agreed to lease the state owned Seagirt container facility to a private company for 50 years. The company is investing $105 million Dollars to construct a 50 foot deep berth to accommodate the “mega ships.” This will create 2,700 more permanent port related jobs and 3,000 construction jobs, 1,000 for the construction of the Berth and 2,000 state and city contractors to improve infrastructure around the terminal including roads and bridges. Over the 50 years the leasers of the port are expected to invest $500 million (Dresser 11-20-2009). This neoliberal approach to privatization of government owned facilities will reduce the amount of capital investment required by the state, while modifying port facilities for the influx of larger ships.
