= Todd Farmhouse (Fort Howard, Maryland) =

Historic house in Maryland, United States

- U.S. National Register of Historic Places
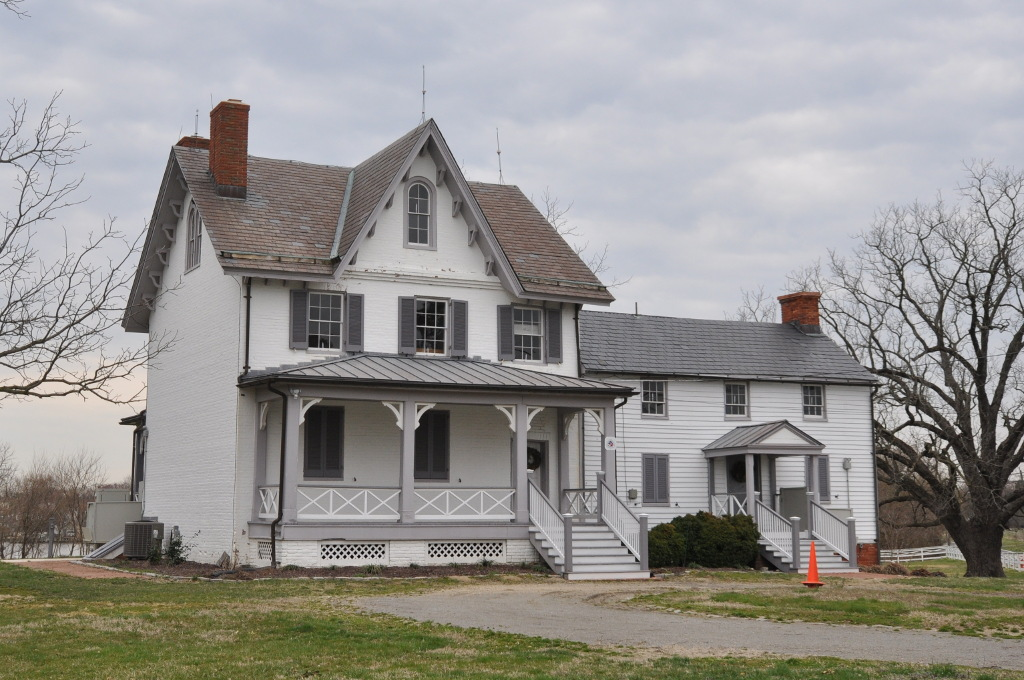

- Location within Maryland Location within the United States
- Location: 9000 North Point Rd, Edgemere, Maryland
- Coordinates: 39°12′49″N 76°26′18″W
- Area: 5 acres (2.0 ha)
- Built: 1816
- Architectural style: Italianate, Federal
- NRHP reference No.: 73000901
- Added to NRHP: October 18, 1973

Todd Farmhouse is a historic home located at Fort Howard, Baltimore County, Maryland, United States. It is a 2 1/2-story, brick dwelling that is three bays in width. Although initially of a Federal architecture inspired plan, later Italianate alterations dominate its present exterior appearance. It features a steeply pitched gable roof. Also on the property are several farm buildings and a family cemetery.

== History ==
In 1664, Thomas Todd made the first purchase of land in what would become over 1000 acres of Baltimore County, MD. During the War of 1812, the house, which overlooks Shallow Creek and the Chesapeake Bay, was used by the Todd family as a lookout point to observe the approaching British Fleet. When troops were spotted coming ashore, family members would sound an alarm. As they withdrew from Baltimore on September 14, 1814, following the Battle of North Point, the British burned the house in retaliation. The Todd farmhouse was one of the few private properties burned by the British.

The house was rebuilt in 1816 and remodeled in 1867. The Todd family owned the property until the early 1970s, when it was purchased by Mr. Elmer H. Cook, a teacher and historian who grew up in the Fort Howard area. After his death in 1996, the house stood vacant and was vandalized. It underwent further renovations in 2009, and was opened to the public as part of the annual Defenders Day celebrations held in September.

The Todd House is owned by the State of Maryland and overseen by the Maryland Department of Natural Resources. An all-volunteer group, Todd's Inheritance Historic Site, Inc., is responsible for daily operations.

The Todd Farmhouse was listed on the National Register of Historic Places in 1973.
