= Gary R. Stevenson =

American sports marketing executive (born 1956)

- Education: Duke University; George Washington University School of Business

Gary R. Stevenson (born 1956 or 1957) is an American sports marketing executive. A graduate of Duke University and George Washington University, he helped start The Golf Channel, developed the business plan for the Women's National Basketball Association (WNBA), and launched Pac-12 Networks. He built a consulting firm, OnSport, that crafted the Wachovia Championship and put together the NASCAR Nationwide Series. After 10 years, he sold OnSport to Wasserman Media Group for a reported $25 million. Since 2013, he has been president and managing director of MLS Business Ventures, a division of Major League Soccer. Stevenson has also served as an independent director for Kilroy Realty Corporation, a publicly traded real estate investment trust, since 2014.

== Background and education ==
Gary Stevenson, the youngest of Robert and Eleanor Stevenson's four children, grew up in Elyria, Ohio, a bedroom community of Cleveland. He graduated from Elyria High School, where he was a two-sport athlete in football and basketball, in 1974; Stevenson was inducted into the Elyria Sports Hall of Fame in 1996. He earned his BA from Duke University and completed an MBA from George Washington University in 1982.

== Career ==
Stevenson started his sports marketing career in Houston in 1980 at ProServ, one of the earliest sports management firms. When two partners in the company, Frank Craighill and Lee Fentress, left in 1983 to form competitor Advantage International, taking about 50 clients with them, Stevenson followed. As vice president in charge of marketing at Advantage International, he developed business opportunities for clients John Elway, John McEnroe, Moses Malone, Hana Mandlíková, and Dan Marino, among others.

=== Golf and basketball ===
Stevenson left Advantage International in 1987 for his first in-house role with a sports league, the PGA Tour. There he eventually became executive vice president of business affairs. At the end of 1994, Stevenson moved to The Golf Channel as executive vice president and chief operating officer, responsible for overseeing day-to-day operations. The channel debuted in January 1995, but struggled to get cable systems to carry it. In August it abandoned its original $6.95-a-month subscriber fee for a price structure that allowed cable operators to sell it bundled with basic cable, as part of a tier, or as premium channel at a cost of $3.95 to $6.95 a month. In September, with the channel forecasting a $40 million loss for the year, and its long-term future uncertain, Stevenson resigned to pursue other business opportunities.

In February 1996, David Stern, the commissioner of the National Basketball Association (NBA), brought Stevenson in as a consultant on two projects, a summer league and a women's league. Stevenson co-drafted the original business plan for the Women's National Basketball Association (WNBA), pitched the projects to owners, and, said Stern, was "instrumental in getting the WNBA off the ground". In August, NBA Properties, the marketing arm of the NBA, tapped Stevenson for president of its marketing and media group, located in New York City. For the next year he oversaw marketing, sponsorship, and media sales for the NBA, WNBA, and USA Basketball.

=== OnSport ===
Raleigh, North Carolina businessman Frank Daniels III, a friend of Stevenson since their Duke University undergraduate days, was forming Total Sports, an online sports information venture. He persuaded Stevenson to join its board of directors in May 1997.

In August, Stevenson left NBA Properties. He moved his family to Raleigh and parlayed his industry knowledge, experience, and contacts into his own media and sponsorship consultancy. Stevenson and his agency, which eventually settled on the name OnSport, had a reputation for forthrightness. Rick Welts, a colleague of his at the NBA and a partner in the agency before he left to be president and chief operating officer of the Phoenix Suns, said "He's never shy about offering an opinion, even if it's not politically correct". This assessment was echoed by Frank Daniels III, who said, "His great talent is that he is very direct ... He gives recommendations based on what he feels, not what he thinks clients want to hear."

Total Sports, with flat revenues and heavy startup costs, foundered as the dot-com bubble collapsed, but OnSport continued to grow. Casey Wasserman joined as a partner in 2001, then left a year later to found Wasserman Media Group. OnSport's employee count rose to 18 and revenue approached the mid-seven figures in 2004.

OnSport specialized in strategic planning around TV sports rights and sponsorship packages. It worked with Stevenson's former employers, the PGA Tour and the NBA, as well as with other sports properties such as Major League Soccer (MLS), the Pac-10 conference, and the U.S. Tennis Association. Among its corporate clients were American Express, Coke, Nationwide, and Wachovia. For the latter, OnSport built a PGA Tour event, the Wachovia Championship, from the ground up. OnSport also put together the NASCAR Nationwide Series.

In June 2007, Stevenson sold OnSport to his former partner's company, Wasserman Media Group, reportedly for $25 million. He remained with the combined company until September 2010.

At the same time as running OnSport, Stevenson taught a course on the business of sport at his alma mater, Duke University.

=== Collegiate sports and soccer ===
The collegiate Pac-10 added two schools to become the Pac-12 Conference in July 2011. Later the same month they announced plans to launch a national TV network and six regional cable networks. Commissioner Larry Scott, impressed with what Stevenson had done with OnSport, turned to him in August to head a new subsidiary, Pac-12 Enterprises. It would oversee three companies: Pac-12 Networks, which would be responsible for the national TV network, six regional cable networks, and relationships with existing network partners ESPN and Fox Sports; Pac-12 Digital Network, which would cover streaming, mobile, and internet presence; and Pac-12 Properties, which would handle all sponsorship, licensing and event management.

Stevenson moved to the San Francisco Bay Area to be near Pac-12 headquarters in Walnut Creek. The first employee of Pac-12 Enterprises, he assembled a staff of 130. They found 70,000 square feet of space in San Francisco, and by August 2012 built a network studio and offices there (using over 100 different contractors), developed broadcasting infrastructure on 12 campuses, scheduled up to 850 broadcasts for the first year, and negotiated carriage agreements with cable providers that made the content available to 48 million homes at launch.

In April 2013, eight months after the successful launch of Pac-12's seven networks, Stevenson stepped down. In June, he was named president and managing director of MLS's new business unit, New York-based MLS Business Ventures. There he "oversees the domestic and international commercial business of MLS which includes Soccer United Marketing (SUM), media and broadcasting, digital, club services, marketing, consumer products, special events and content creation and distribution."
