= Fort Howard Veterans Hospital =

- United States Department of Veterans Affairs
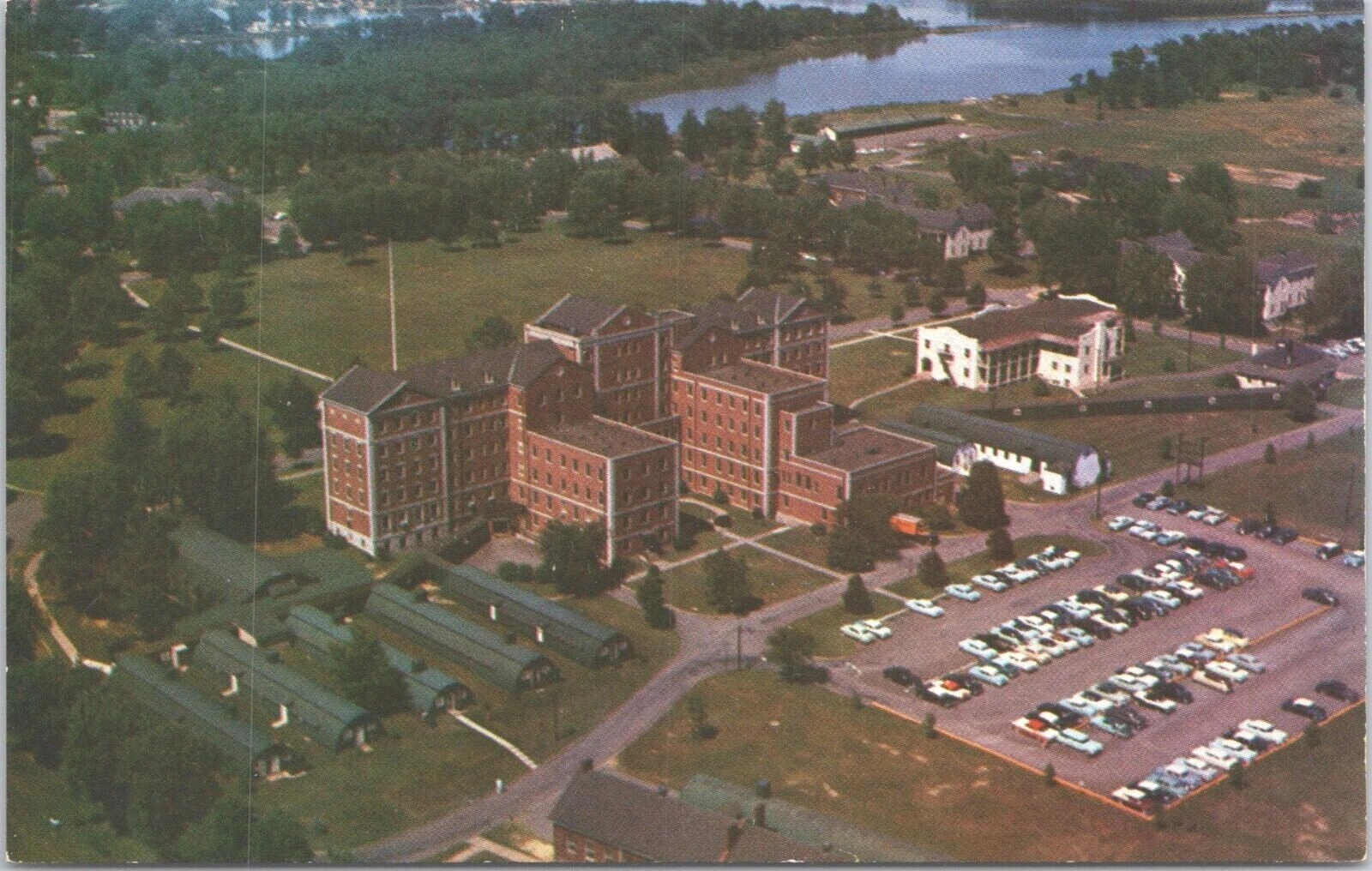
- The main building, likely sometime in the 1970s

Geography
- Location: end of North Point Road, Fort Howard, Maryland, United States
- Coordinates: 39.1994°N 76.446°W

History
- Opened: about 1940
- Closed: 2000

Links
- Lists: Hospitals in Maryland

Fort Howard Veterans Hospital is an abandoned hospital in Fort Howard, Maryland, located at the end of North Point Road. It occupies part of the grounds of Fort Howard, an early fortification protecting Baltimore harbor.

== History ==
The Fort Howard Veterans Hospital sat on the site of Fort Howard, a site that saw military action dating back to the War of 1812 when the British landed thousands of men there as the precursor to the Battle of Baltimore. In August 1940 the Veterans Administration (VA) acquired the title to the fort, and began moving operations there in January 1941. When the VA took over the site, the Medical Corps building was renovated to be the nurses’ home, infirmary, and attendants’ quarters. From 1925 to 1928 that nurses' home was the headquarters of General Douglas MacArthur. The hospital officially opened for patient care in 1943.

Starting in 1958, the hospital was a major health services research site in the VA's early effort to increase care and efficiency in its hospital system in what became known as the Fort Howard Program. The program was the initiation of the Health Services R&D Service (HSR&D). During the program, the HSR&D established the VA's first intensive care unit to test the value of individual monitoring.

The hospital closed in the early 2000s and the VA is leasing the site for mixed-use development for veterans.

In 2014, vandals set fire to the main hospital building, resulting in significant damage to the structure. After this incident, the property was guarded by private security due to arsonists previously setting fire to several of the buildings.

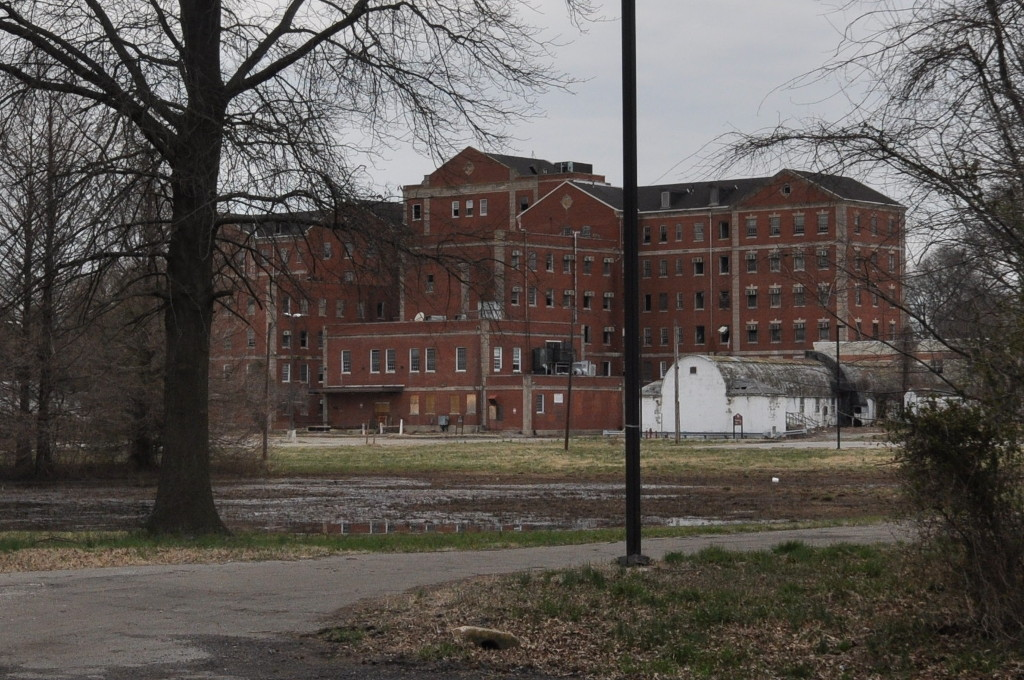
The main building in 2019

As of 2025, the current status of the site's redevelopment and future use is in limbo, as the community opposes the developers plans.

The property remains closed to the public and is marked by fences and private security.
