= Fort McHenry Guard =

The Fort McHenry Guard is a dynamic volunteer unit that serves Fort McHenry National Monument and Historic Shrine.

Dedicated men and women of all ages from across Maryland, Guard members dress in period clothes from the War of 1812 and help interpret the Battle of Baltimore and the role of Fort McHenry for the many visitors who come to the park annually. Beyond the park, the Guard assists in other War of 1812 events and reenactments at places such as Riversdale and Havre de Grace.

Among their members is former Governor of Maryland, Martin O'Malley who was named their honorary colonel in 2003.

In 2005, the Guard was presented the George B. Hartzog award for serving as the National Park Service's best volunteer unit.
