= Leading Point Light =

Lighthouse in Maryland, United States

- Location: Leading Point west of the Francis Scott Key Bridge on the south bank of the Patapsco River
- Coordinates: 39.2137°N 76.5518°W

Tower
- Constructed: 1868
- Construction: Brick
- Height: 34 ft
- Shape: House with lantern/daymark on roof

Light
- First lit: 1868
- Deactivated: 1924
- Focal height: 21 m (69 ft)
- Characteristic: F G

The Leading Point Light was an unusual lighthouse which displayed the rear light to the Brewerton Channel Range. It was eventually superseded by an iron tower on the same foundation.

== History ==
This light was built in 1868, along with the Hawkins Point Light, to provide range lights marking the Brewerton Channel, excavated in the 1850s to provide a fixed deepwater channel into Baltimore Harbor. In form, it was like no other lighthouse in the area, a brick house with a short tower holding the lantern surmounted with a tall pole supporting a large ball, to be used as a daymark.

In 1924 both lights in this range were torn down and replaced with skeleton towers, which remain in use.
