= Lloyd R. Craighill =

American missionary (1886–1971)

Lloyd Rutherford Craighill (葛兴仁, September 3, 1886 – March 13, 1971) (Honorary D.D., Virginia Theological Seminary) was an American missionary to China, born in Lynchburg, Virginia. Craighill was consecrated on November 29, 1940, as the second Bishop of Anking. He succeeded Daniel Trumbull Huntington, who had served as first missionary Bishop of Anking. Craighill left China in 1949. His resignation was accepted by the 1949 General Convention of the Episcopal Church, on September 28, and was effective immediately. He is buried at Oak Grove Cemetery in Lexington, Virginia.

== See also ==
- Christianity in China
