= Fort McHenry =

United States fort in Baltimore, Maryland

Fort McHenry National Monument and Historic Shrine
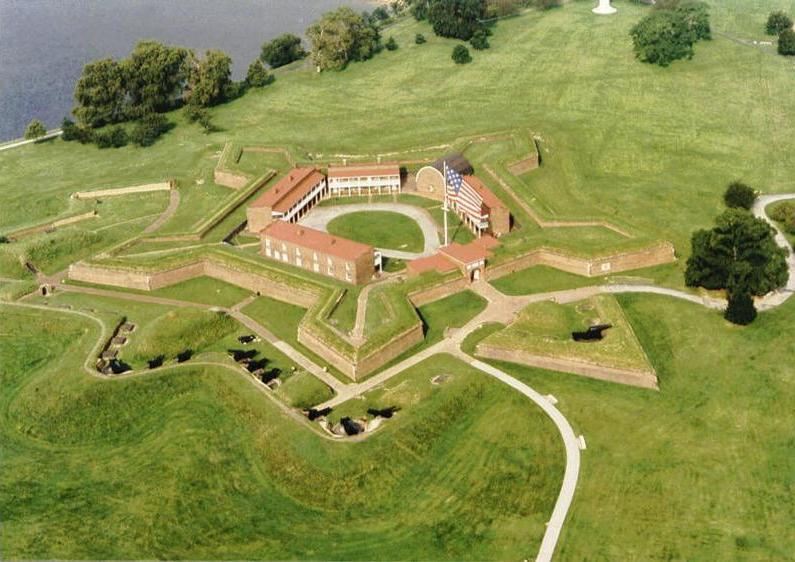
- Interactive map of Fort McHenry National Monument and Historic Shrine
- 39°15′48″N 76°34′48″W
- Location: 2400 East Fort Avenue; Baltimore, Maryland, U.S.

Site notes
- Area: 43.26 acres (17.51 ha)
- Governing body: National Park Service
- Visitors: 635,736 (in 2018)
- Website: www.nps.gov/fomc

U.S. National Monument
- Designated: August 11, 1939

U.S. National Register of Historic Places
- Designated: October 15, 1966

Baltimore City Landmark
- Designated: 1986

Fort McHenry is a historical American coastal pentagonal bastion fort on Locust Point, now a neighborhood of Baltimore, Maryland. It is best known for its role in the War of 1812, when it successfully defended Baltimore Harbor from an attack by the British Royal Navy from the Chesapeake Bay on September 13–14, 1814.

The fort was built in 1798 and was used continuously by U.S. armed forces through World War I and by the United States Coast Guard in World War II. It was designated a national park in 1925, and, in 1939, was redesignated a U.S. National Monument.

During the War of 1812, an American storm flag, 17 by 25 feet (5.2 m × 7.6 m), was flown over Fort McHenry during the British bombardment of the fort. The flag was replaced early on the morning of September 14, 1814, with a larger American garrison flag, 30 by 42 feet (9.1 m × 12.8 m). The flag's continued flying signaled that the fort continued to remain in American hands, leading British forces to withdraw and ending the Battle of Baltimore in an American victory.

The sight of the ensign inspired Francis Scott Key to write the poem "Defence of Fort M'Henry" that was later set to music in the song "To Anacreon in Heaven", which was later known and designated as "The Star-Spangled Banner", the national anthem of the United States.

== Construction ==
Fort McHenry was built on the site of the former Fort Whetstone, which was used to defend Baltimore from 1776 to 1797. Fort Whetstone stood on Whetstone Point in the residential and industrial area of present-day Locust Point in Baltimore, which juts into the opening of Baltimore Harbor between the basin at the present-day Inner Harbor and Northwest branch on the north side and the Middle and Ferry (now Southern) branches of the Patapsco River on the south side.

The Frenchman Jean Foncin designed the fort in 1798, and it was built between 1798 and 1800. The new fort's purpose was to improve the defenses of the increasingly important Port of Baltimore from future enemy attacks.

The new fort was a bastioned pentagon, surrounded by a dry moat—a deep, broad trench. The moat would serve as a shelter from which infantry might defend the fort from a land attack. In case of such an attack on this first line of defense, each point, or bastion could provide a crossfire of cannon and small-arms fire.

Fort McHenry was named after early American statesman James McHenry (1753–1816), a Scots-Irish immigrant and surgeon-soldier. He was a delegate to the Continental Congress from Maryland and a signer of the United States Constitution. Afterwards, he was appointed United States Secretary of War (1796–1800), serving under Presidents George Washington and John Adams.

== Events ==
=== Battle of Baltimore ===
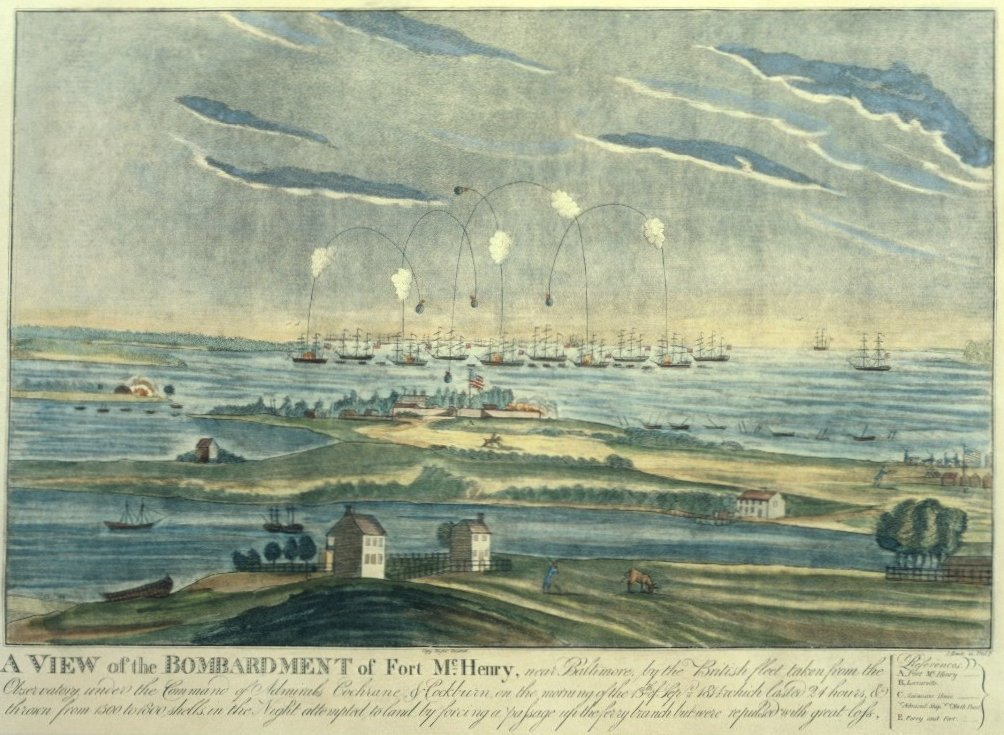
Bombardment of Fort McHenry

Beginning at 6:00 a.m. on September 13, 1814, British warships under the command of Vice Admiral Alexander Cochrane continuously bombarded Fort McHenry for 25 hours. The American defenders had 18-, 24- and 32-pounder (8, 11, and 16 kg) cannons. The British guns had a range of 2 miles (3 km), and the British rockets had a 1.75-mile (2.8 km) range, but neither guns nor rockets were accurate. The British ships were unable to pass Fort McHenry and penetrate Baltimore Harbor because of its defenses, including a chain of 22 sunken ships, and the American cannons. The British vessels were able to fire their rockets and mortars at the fort only at the weapons' maximum range. The poor accuracy on both sides resulted in very little damage to either side before the British, having depleted their ammunition, ceased their attack on the morning of September 14. Only one British warship, a bomb vessel, received a direct hit from the fort's return fire, which wounded one sailor. The British withdrew after the bombardment, ending the Battle of Baltimore in an American victory.

The Americans, under the command of Major George Armistead, lost four killed—one woman was cut in half by a bomb as she carried supplies to the troops—and 24 wounded, including one black soldier, Private William Williams. At one point during the bombardment, a bomb crashed through the fort's powder magazine. However, either the rain extinguished the fuse or the bomb was a dud.

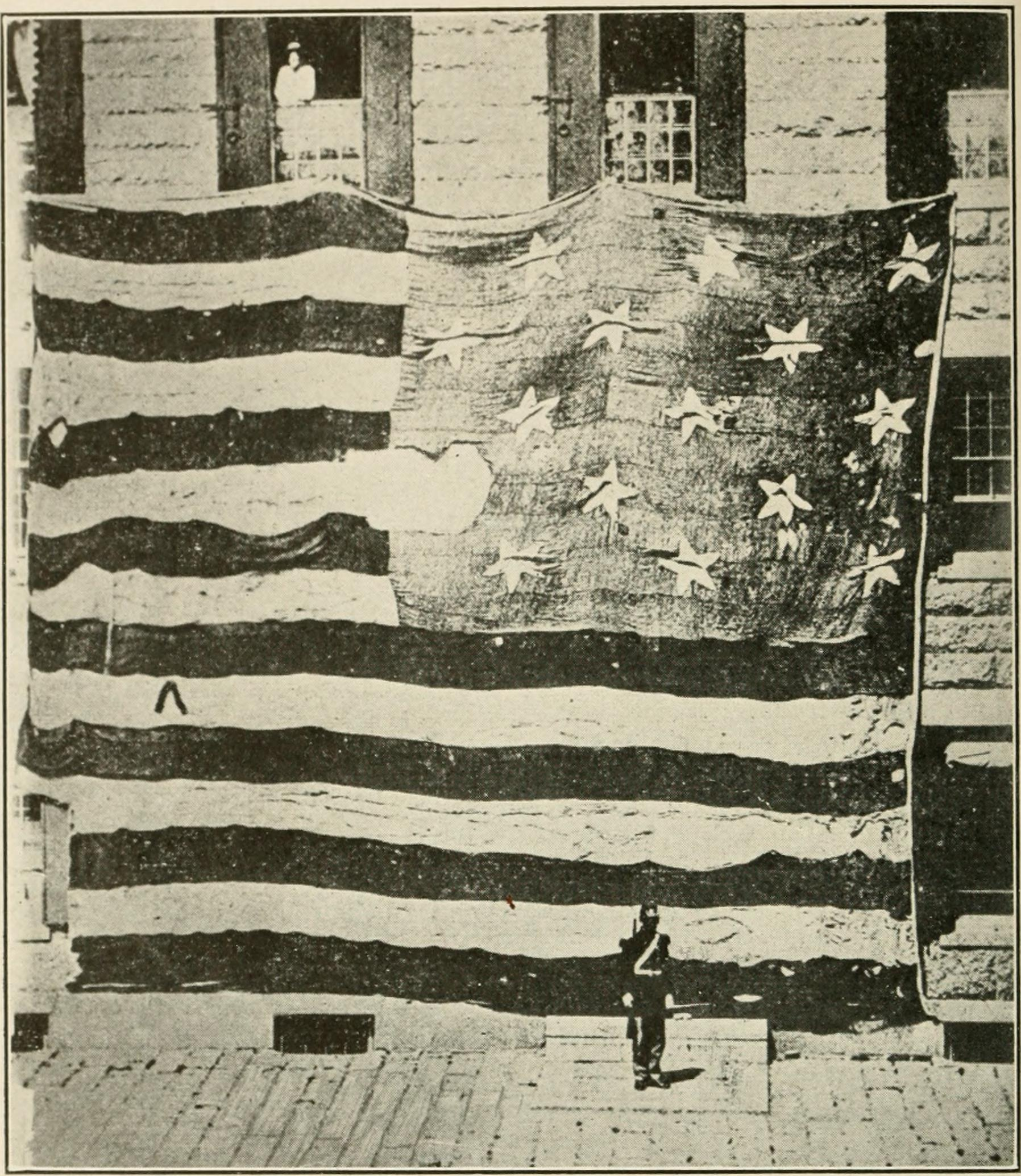
Flag that flew over Fort McHenry during its bombardment in 1814, which was witnessed by Francis Scott Key. The family of Major George Armistead, the commander of the fort, donated the flag to the Smithsonian Institution in 1912.

==== National anthem inspiration ====
Washington lawyer Francis Scott Key went to Baltimore to negotiate the release of Dr. William Beans, a civilian prisoner of war, and there he witnessed the bombardment from a nearby truce ship. An oversized American flag had been sewn by Mary Pickersgill for $405.90 in anticipation of the British attack on the fort. Key saw the flag emerge intact in the dawn of September 14, and he was so moved that he began to compose "Defence of Fort M'Henry" set to the tune "To Anacreon in Heaven". It was renamed "The Star-Spangled Banner" and became the United States' national anthem, and has even been translated into various languages, targeted mostly for US immigrants who later acquired American citizenship.

=== Military prison ===
During the American Civil War the area where Fort McHenry sits served as a military prison, confining both Confederate soldiers, as well as a large number of Maryland political figures who were criticizing then President Abraham Lincoln. The imprisoned included newly elected Baltimore Mayor George William Brown, the city council, and the new police commissioner, George P. Kane, and members of the Maryland General Assembly along with several newspaper editors and owners. Francis Scott Key's grandson, Francis Key Howard, was one of these political detainees. Some of the cells used still exist and can be visited at the fort. Fort McHenry also served to train artillery at this time; this service is the origin of the Rodman guns presently located and displayed at the fort.

On May 25, 1861 John Merryman was arrested in Baltimore County and imprisoned in Fort McHenry. Merryman had had a role in destroying bridges in Maryland to impede the movement of Union troops. Merryman petitioned Supreme Court Chief Justice Roger B. Taney for a writ of habeas corpus, and Taney granted the petition, demanding that Merryman appear in his courtroom the next day and sending U.S. Marshals to the fort to enforce the ruling. A famous and dramatic standoff then occurred at the gates of the fort between the Federal Marshals and General George Cadwalader, the commander of Union troops of the Fort. The commander refused to comply with the order on the grounds that he was acting under orders from President Abraham Lincoln, who had suspended habeas corpus. The court case, Ex parte Merryman, remains unresolved, and the Executive Branch continued to refuse to comply with Taney's ruling.

=== 20th century ===
==== World War I ====
During World War I, an additional hundred-odd buildings were built on the land surrounding the fort in order to convert the entire facility into an enormous U.S. Army hospital for the treatment of troops returning home from the European conflict. None of those buildings remain, while the original fort has been preserved and restored to essentially its condition during the War of 1812.

==== World War II ====
During World War II, Fort McHenry served as a Coast Guard base. Used for training, the historic sections remained open to the public.

==== National monument ====
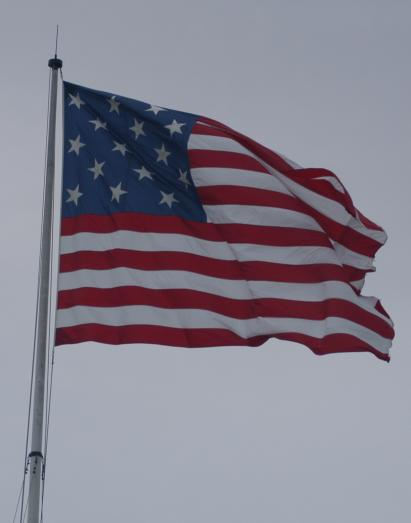
A replica of the 15-star/15-stripe U.S. flag that currently flies over Fort McHenry

The fort was made a national park in 1925; on August 11, 1939, it was redesignated a "National Monument and Historic Shrine", the only such doubly designated place in the United States. It was placed on the National Register of Historic Places on October 15, 1966. It has become national tradition that when a new flag is designed it first flies over Fort McHenry. The first official 49- and 50-star American flags were flown over the fort and are still located on the premises.

=== Today ===
The fort has become a center of recreation for the Baltimore locals as well as a prominent tourist destination. Thousands of visitors come each year to see the "Birthplace of the Star-Spangled Banner." It's easily accessible by water taxi from the popular Baltimore Inner Harbor. However, to prevent abuse of the parking lots at the Fort, the National Park Service does not permit passengers to take the water taxi back to the Inner Harbor unless they have previously used it to arrive at the monument.

Several authorized archaeological digs have been conducted, and found artifacts are on display in one of the buildings surrounding the Parade Ground. These structures, as well as the Visitor Center, have numerous other exhibits as well that show the fort's use over time.

Every September, the City of Baltimore commemorates Defenders Day in honor of the Battle of Baltimore. It is the biggest celebration of the year at the Fort, accompanied by a weekend of programs, events, and fireworks.

In 2005 the living history volunteer unit, the Fort McHenry Guard, was awarded the George B. Hartzog award for serving the National Park Service as the best volunteer unit. Among the members of the unit is Martin O'Malley, the former mayor of Baltimore and Governor of Maryland, who was made the unit's honorary colonel in 2003.

The flag that flew over Fort McHenry, the Star-Spangled Banner Flag, has deteriorated to an extremely fragile condition. After undergoing restoration at the National Museum of American History, it is now on display there in a special exhibit that allows it to lie at a slight angle in dim light.

The United States Code currently authorizes Fort McHenry's closure to the public in the event of a national emergency for use by the military for the duration of such an emergency.

In 2013, Fort McHenry National Monument and Historic Shrine was honored with its own quarter under the America the Beautiful Quarters Program.

On September 10–16, 2014, Fort McHenry celebrated the bicentennial of the writing of the Star-Spangled Banner called the Star-Spangled Spectacular. The event included a parade of tall ships, a large fireworks show, and the Navy's Blue Angels

As of 2015, restoration efforts began to preserve the original brick used in construction of the Fort, primarily through mortar replacement.

On August 26, 2020, when due to the COVID-19 pandemic a normal Republican National Convention could not be held, vice president Mike Pence held his acceptance speech at Fort McHenry after being nominated for a second term as vice president of the United States.

On November 21, 2025, Fort McHenry was closed temporarily due when construction workers unearthed what appeared to be unexploded ordnance. It was safely deposed of, and the fort reopened the next day.

== Gallery ==
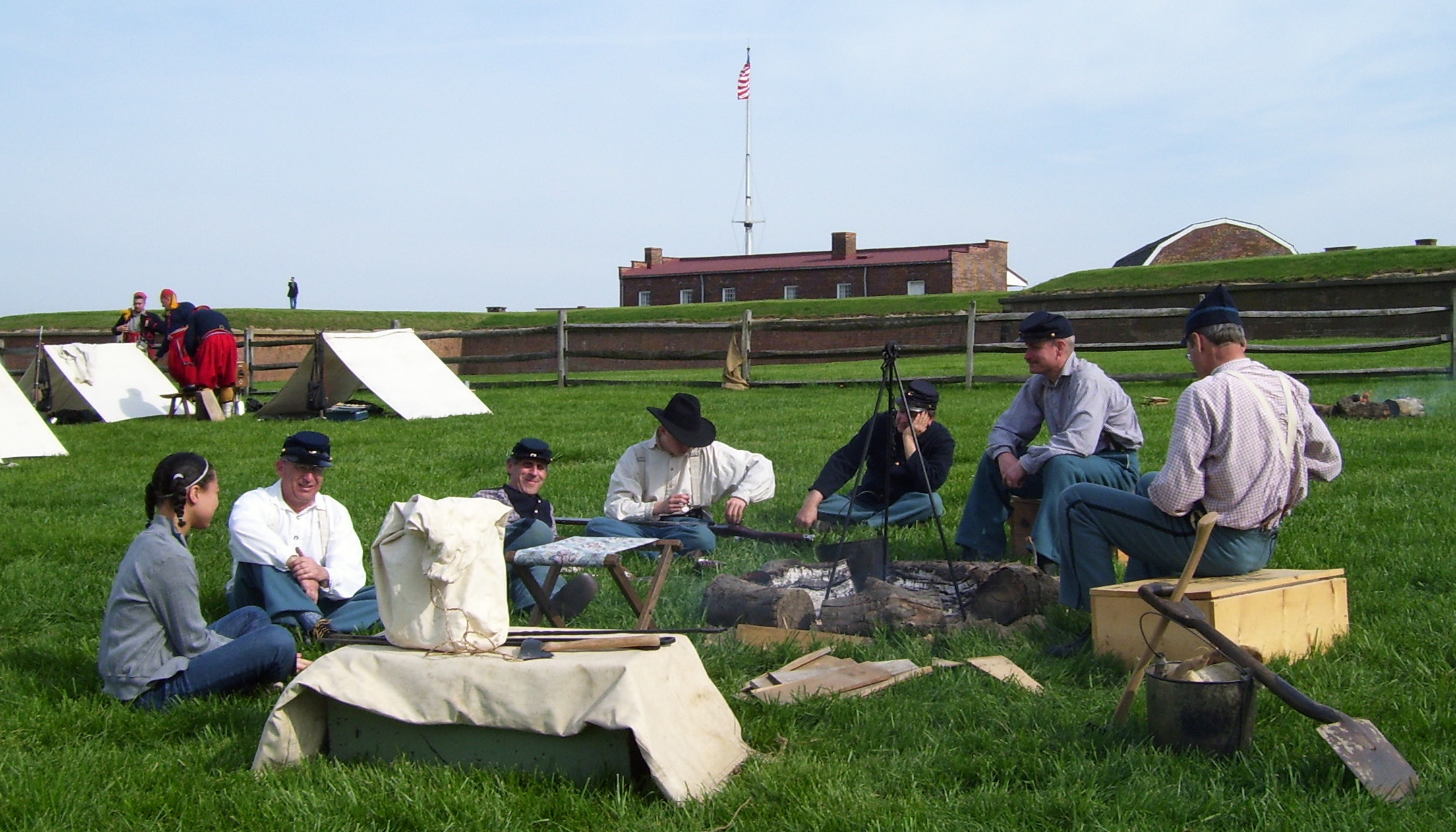
Historical re-enactment at Fort McHenry

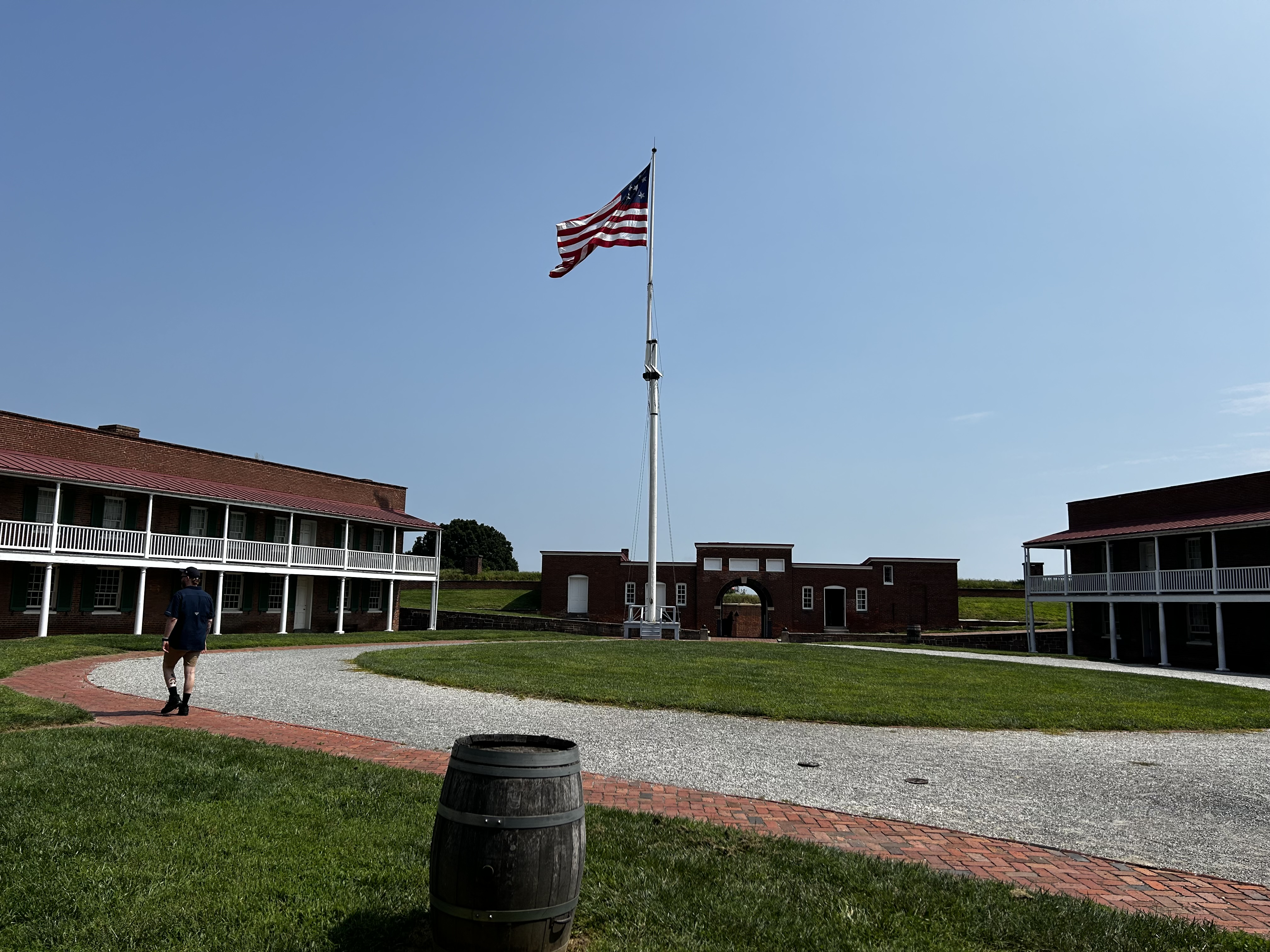
The interior of modern Fort McHenry

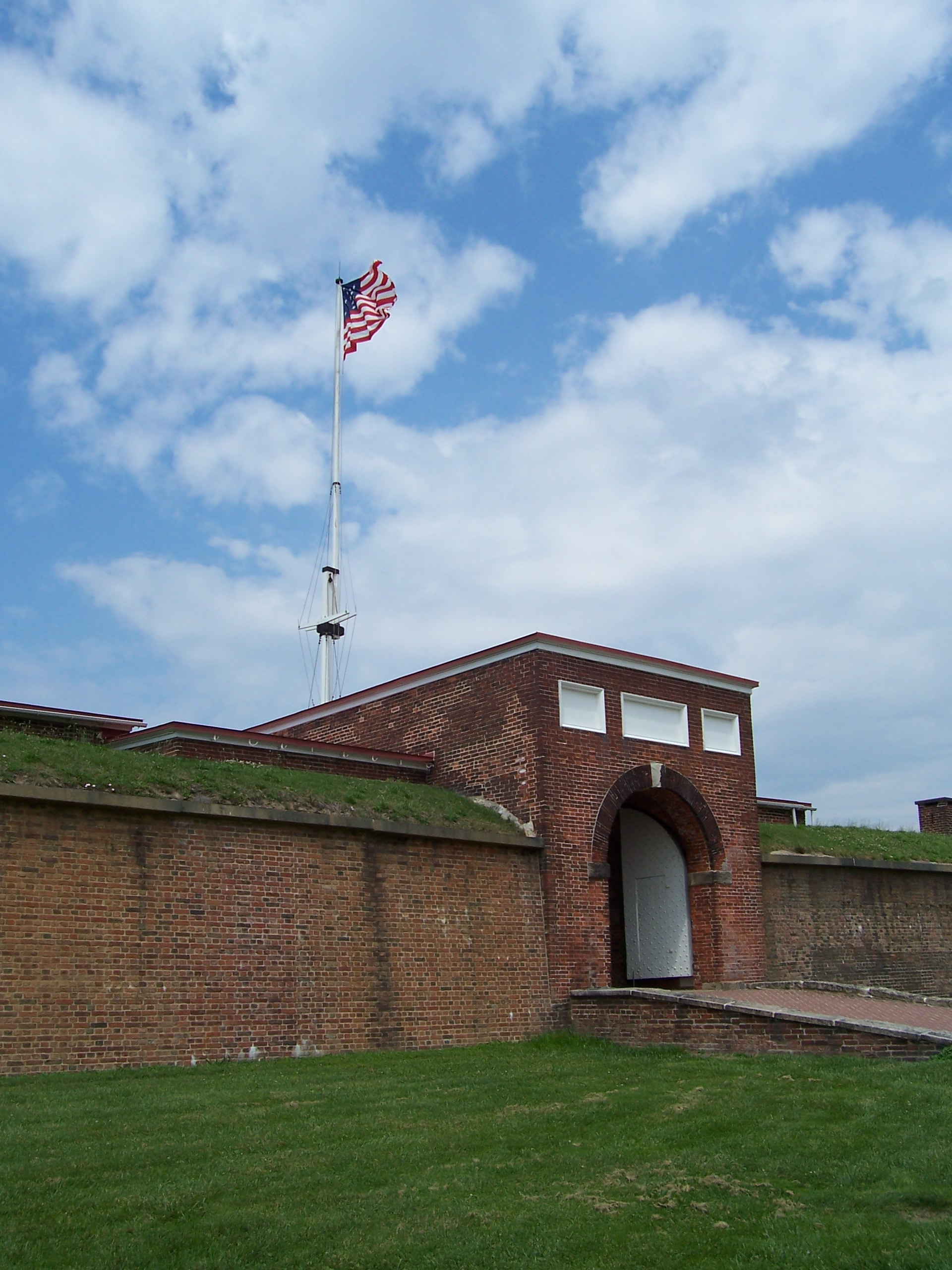
The sally port (main entrance) into Fort McHenry.

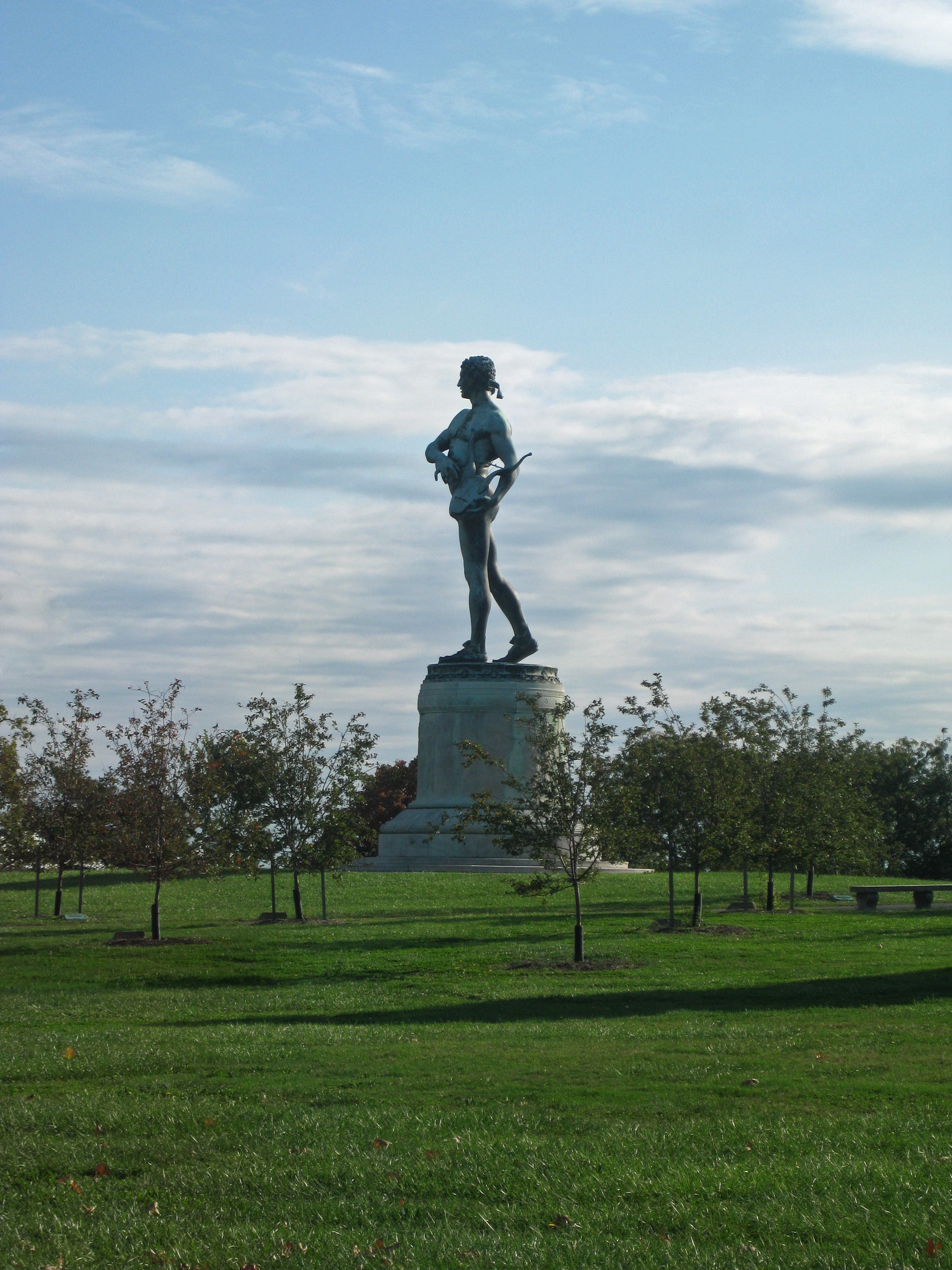
Adjacent to Fort McHenry lies a monument of Orpheus that is dedicated to the soldiers of the fort and Francis Scott Key.

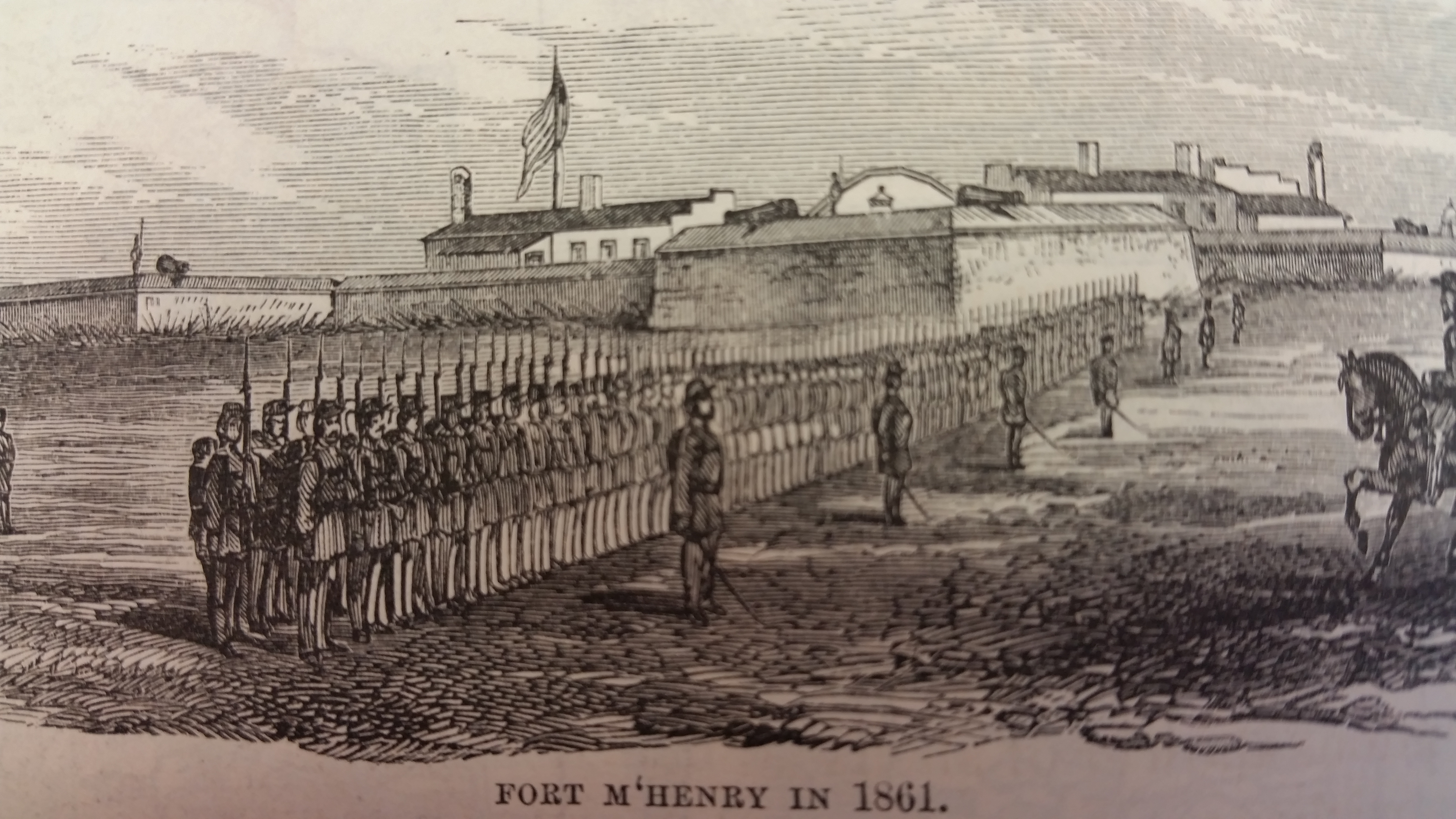
Fort McHenry

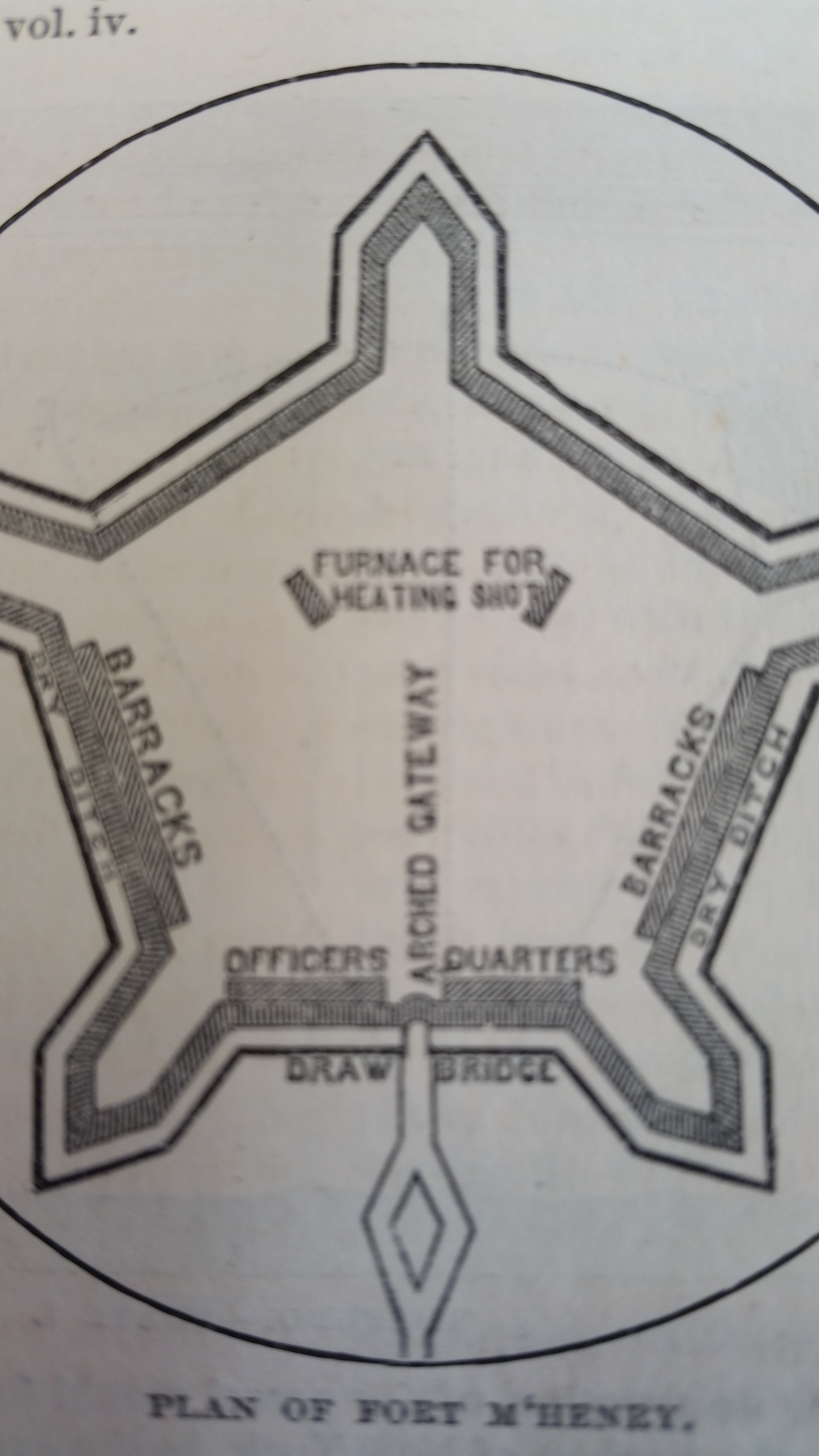
Fort McHenry map

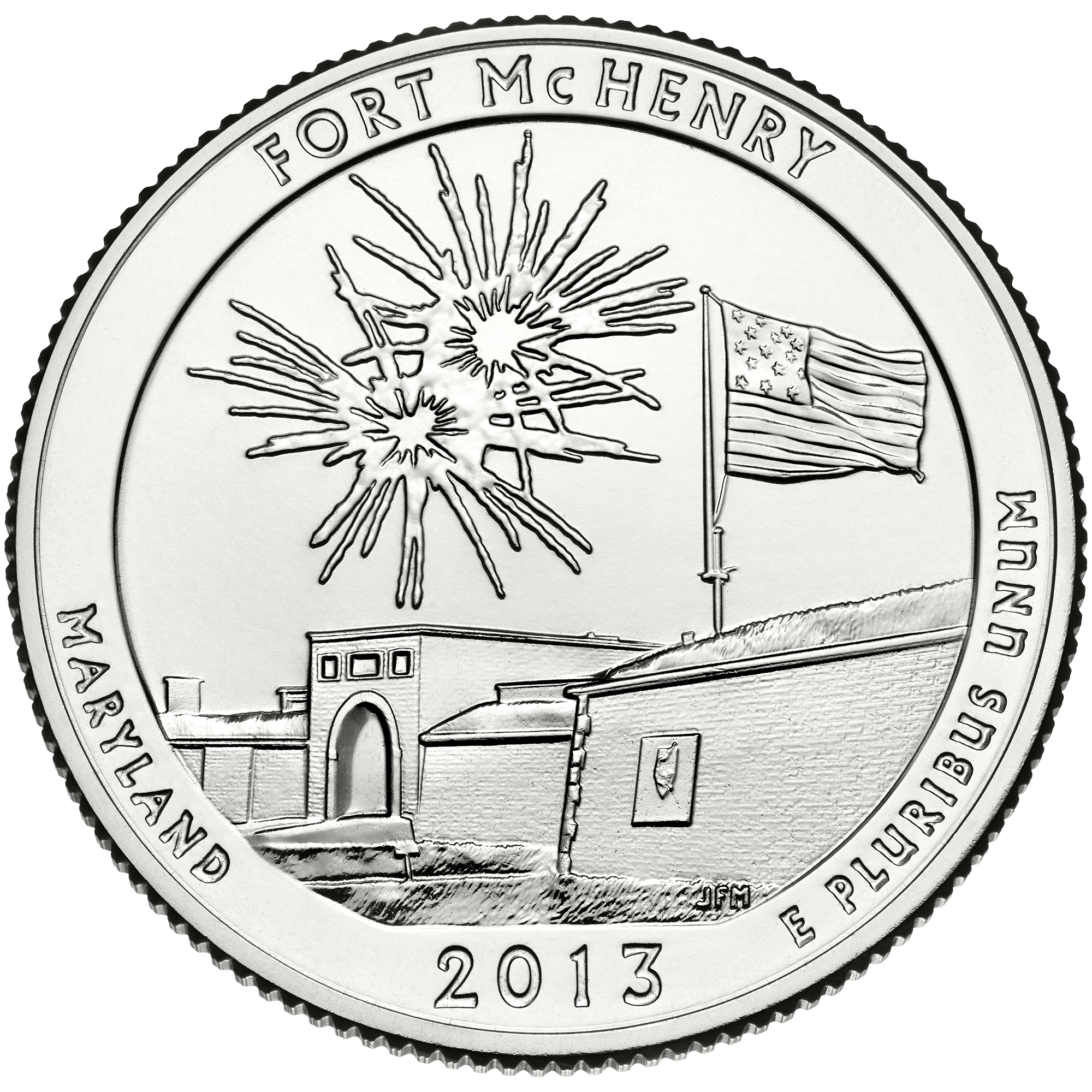
Fort McHenry is featured on Maryland's America the Beautiful quarter.

== See also ==
- Battle of Baltimore
