= Hawkins Point Light =

Lighthouse in Maryland, United States

- Location: Hawkins Point just south of the Francis Scott Key Bridge on the south bank of the Patapsco River
- Coordinates: 39.2079°N 76.5326°W

Tower
- Constructed: 1868
- Foundation: screw-pile
- Construction: cast-iron/wood
- Height: 34 ft
- Shape: square house

Light
- First lit: 1868
- Deactivated: 1924

The Hawkins Point Light was an unusual screw-pile lighthouse which displayed the front light to the Brewerton Channel Range. It was eventually superseded by an iron tower on the same foundation.

== History ==
This light was built in 1868 as part of a project to mark the Brewerton Channel, which had been excavated in the 1850s to provide a fixed deepwater channel into Baltimore Harbor. It served as the front of a pair of range lights, with the Leading Point Light serving as the rear.

Like most lights constructed on the bay in this period, Hawkins Point was a screw-pile structure, but of a unique configuration. The square foundation had an outrigger on each side, so that the rectangular house, viewed from above, appeared to sit diagonally on its base. As originally built, it housed two lights. The range light itself shone from a window in the second story of the house, while a second beacon was mounted in a tower on the roof. This tower was removed in the early 1900s, leaving a curiously truncated roofline.

In 1924 the house was removed, and a skeletal tower erected on the iron foundation. This light continues to serve as the front light of the Brewerton Channel Range, but it no longer is given a name in navigational charts.
