= Fort Howard (Maryland) =

Former fort in Baltimore County, Maryland, US

Coordinates: 39°11′54″N 076°26′37″W

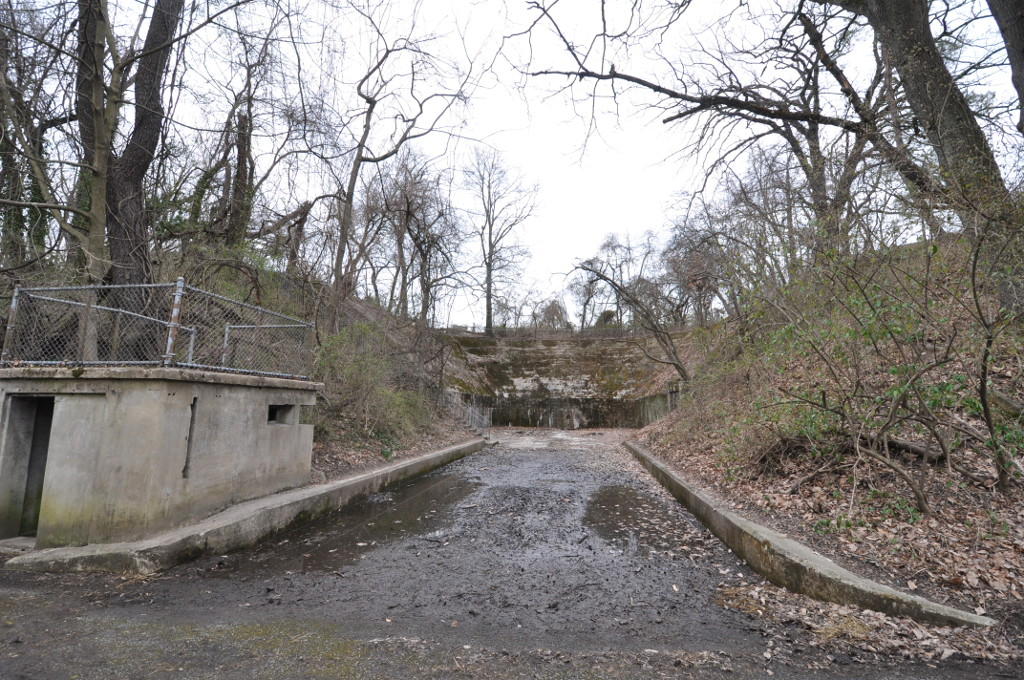
One of the fort's two mortar pits, 2019

Fort Howard was a military installation located on the North Point peninsula, overlooking the main channel of the Patapsco River leading into the harbor of Baltimore, Maryland, United States. Although militarily important since the early 19th century, the surviving elements of the fort and its name date to the Spanish–American War. It was named by Elihu Root, Secretary of War under President Theodore Roosevelt, in 1902 after Colonel John Eager Howard (1752–1827). The installation earned the nickname of the "Bulldog at Baltimore's Gate", serving as the headquarters for the coast defenses of Baltimore. Fort Howard's historical significance is its military connection with the War of 1812, the Spanish–American War, and World War II.

The fort grounds are now divided between a public park, which encompasses the sites of its batteries, and the non-public grounds of the former Fort Howard Veterans Hospital, which are in the process of redevelopment.

== Location ==
Fort Howard is located in the present-day unincorporated community and census-designated place of Fort Howard, Maryland. It is strategically situated on the North Point peninsula, which overlooks the mouth of the Patapsco River leading directly to Baltimore Harbor, at the northern end of the Chesapeake Bay. The mouth of the Back River is to the east, while Old Road Bay is to the west, forming the boundaries of the peninsula.

== History ==
=== War of 1812 ===
Then known as North Point in 1793 after sea Captain Robert North, Fort Howard is the beach-head location of the British expeditionary marine forces landing of approximately 4,500 as a part of the land and sea campaign to capture and burn Baltimore during the War of 1812 on September 12, 1814 in the Battle of Baltimore. To date the invasion is the largest in United States history.

In coordination with their Royal Navy's bombardment of Fort McHenry (September 13–14 under the command of Lt. Col. George Armistead), the British troops were to march up the North Point peninsula and capture Baltimore from the east but the British advance was demoralized when the commander, Major-General Robert Ross (1766–1814), was killed by a skirmish sharpshooter, identified as either Daniel Wells or Henry G. McComas.

The advance was then temporarily stalled by the Americans' fierce resistance by several regiments of the Maryland Militia under the command of Brig. Gen. John Stricker, (1758–1825), in the Battle of North Point on September 12, southeast of the city. After the several hours battle that afternoon, the American left-wing finally collapsed and retreated in good order to the far more substantial dug-in fortifications with about 100 cannons and 20,000 volunteer and drafted citizens and militia erected under the supervision of Maj. Gen. Samuel Smith, (1752–1839), on the heights east of the city, "Loudenschlager Hill" (later "Hampstead Hill"). When the British, now under Col. Arthur Brooke, (1772–1843), perceived the strength of the substantial American defenses and failing to make any successful flank attacks, awaited the reinforcements of the British fleet to come upriver to bomb and shell the Fort and force a passage past the sunken ship obstacles in the Harbor channel.

After two days and a rainstorm-filled night, disheartened, the British troops withdrew retreating back to North Point, reboarded their ships leaving Baltimore not to return.

=== Late 19th and early 20th century ===
The site was taken over in 1896 by the U.S. Department of War for the construction of coastal artillery fortifications (known as the "Endicott" or "Third Period") in the pre-Spanish–American War era before 1898.In 1902, reinforced concrete coast batteries were erected at Fort Howard. The batteries were named in honor of famous Marylanders of the War of 1812. Fort Howard, called the "Bulldog at Baltimore's Gate," was manned by four companies of Coast Artillery Corps – the 21st, 40th, 103rd, and 140th. The guns at the Fort included 12-inch disappearing rifles, 12-inch mortars, 6-inch rifles, and 4.7 and 3-inch rapid-fire weapons. Each battery contained from two to four guns. The gunners who manned these batteries were among the best coast artillerymen in the world. In 1908 they were credited with setting a world’s record by hitting a moving target over 5,000 yards away, nine out of ten times. The shell that missed was defective.

In 1917, the troops at Fort Howard were doubled and its men were put on a wartime basis due to the concerns of an impending war. To keep in shape, the gunners drilled by mock firing on steamers which were the only crafts sighted in their waters. The artillerymen who lived on the base resided in what was like any ordinary small city. Along the main driveway were attractive officers' cottages, one of which belonged to the commander of the Fort. The “Bachelors’ Quarters” was one of the four barracks housing single enlisted men, while married men were permitted to live outside of the gate.

=== Later uses ===
It was the first headquarters of the newly formed Third Corps Area in 1920, and became the Headquarters of the Coast Defenses of Baltimore in 1922. The nurses' home was the headquarters of General Douglas MacArthur from 1925 to 1928. In 1934 and 1935, Laurence Halstead commanded the 12th Infantry Regiment and Fort Howard.

The installation was turned over to the U.S. Veterans' Administration (now the U.S. Department of Veterans Affairs) in 1940, which still owns the majority of the property, and which established the Fort Howard Veterans Hospital on the site. During World War II it was used as a holding center for German prisoners of war and Japanese and German "enemy aliens" (non-citizen residents of the U.S. who were arrested as potential fifth columnists but, in most cases, denied due process).

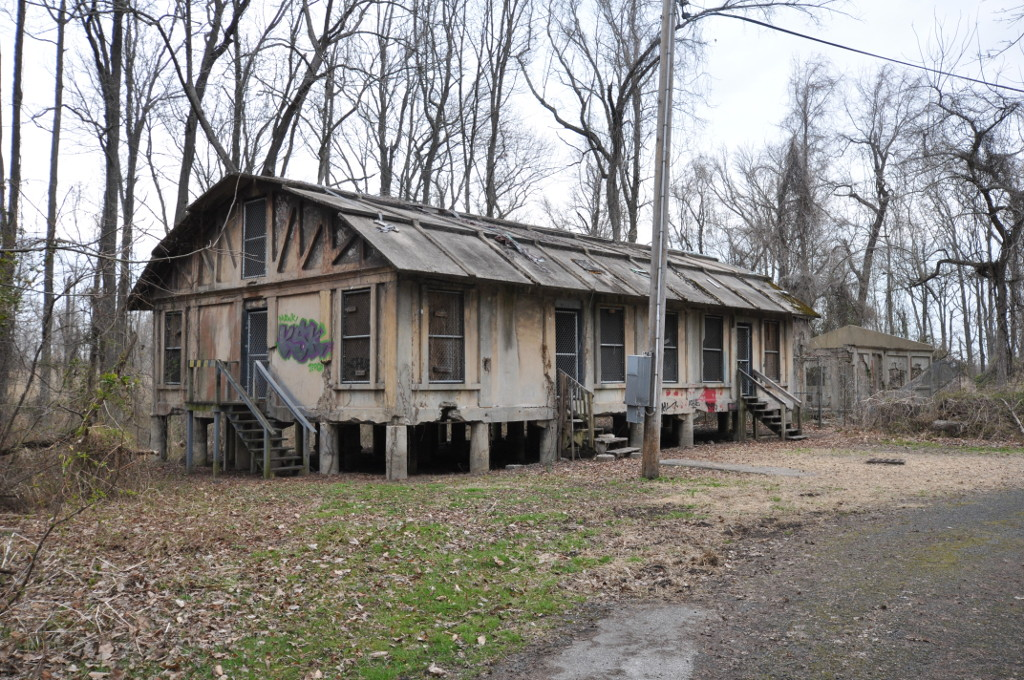
An imitation Vietnamese house built for training purposes

In the 1960s it was used as an auxiliary training area for the U. S. Army Intelligence School at Fort Holabird in Dundalk. A typical Vietnamese village was built there to train Special Forces ("green Berets") for counterinsurgency operations in the Vietnam War. The village had realistic tunnels. Instructors acted the part of insurgents who were captured and subjected to training interrogation and often to harsh treatment. Also in the 1960s and until the mid-1970s, other students were trained there in water and land infiltration and instructors were the opposition. When students were caught they were interrogated in the underground coastal defense bunkers. Interrogation usually meant the students holding bricks on their outstretched arms while standing naked on rubber tires. All training ceased when the Intelligence school moved to Fort Huachuca in Arizona.

The portion of the property containing the old coastal artillery fortifications was declared surplus federal land and was transferred to Baltimore County in 1975 for use as a historical park. Interpretive plaques and signs were placed throughout the park explaining the various military fortifications, weapons and their purposes.

Two surviving examples of the 4.7 inch Gun M1906 designed and issued by the US Army Ordnance Department in 1906 are on display at Fort Howard.

The Edgemere Sparrows Point Recreation Council has long utilized the park as a fundraising haunted attraction during the annual Halloween season titled "The Fort Howard Haunted Dungeons." The park is closed to the public during this annual tradition which typically runs from late September through October and is a major community fundraiser.

A free trick or treat event for children is hosted annually by the organization and gives the public the chance to view inside of the former concrete coastal batteries at no cost.
