= Craighill Channel Upper Range Rear Light =

Lighthouse in Maryland, United States

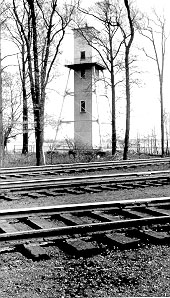
- Craighill Channel Upper Range Rear Light
- Location: East side of Sparrows Point on the north shore of the Patapsco River
- Coordinates: 39°12′58.32″N 76°27′45.72″W

Tower
- Foundation: stone
- Construction: iron skeleton tower
- Automated: 1929
- Height: 64 feet (20 m)
- Shape: pyramidal with square central shaft
- Heritage: National Register of Historic Places listed place

Light
- First lit: 1886
- Focal height: 22.5 m (74 ft)
- Characteristic: Fixed red (originally white)
- Cut-off Channel Range Rear Light Station
- U.S. National Register of Historic Places
- Nearest city: Edgemore, Maryland
- Area: less than one acre
- Built: 1886
- MPS: Light Stations of the United States MPS
- NRHP reference No.: 02001423
- Added to NRHP: December 02, 2002

The Craighill Channel Upper Range Rear Light is one of a pair of range lights that marks the second section of the shipping channel into Baltimore harbor.

== History ==
This light was constructed in 1885 as part of a range light pair to mark the then newly excavated Craighill Cutoff Channel. A modest iron skeleton tower was erected, pyramidal in form with a wooden, corrugated iron-sheathed square shaft at its center to house the lamp and the access stairway. Its only architectural ornaments were a few windows to light the stairwell and a gallery to allow the outside of the light's window to be cleaned. A keeper's house was built nearby, connected to the light by a brick walk. The original light was a locomotive headlight displaying a fixed white light; this has since been replaced with a more conventional fixture displaying a red light.

The grounds were (and are) surrounded by private property, and in 1888 there was a dispute over access to the light. Other than that the light has passed a quiet life, punctuated only by automation in 1929 and the demolition of the keeper's house. It is still an active aid to navigation.
