= Frank Craighill =

Sports agent (1939–2025)

- Born: May 20, 1939
- Died: December 25, 2025 (aged 86)
- Occupation: Sports agent

Frank Craighill (May 20, 1939 – December 25, 2025) was a sports agent who was one of the founding partners of the sports marketing firm ProServ. ProServ was created in 1970 in Washington, D.C. by attorney and former professional tennis player and U.S. Davis Cup captain Donald Dell and Craighill. Their first clients were Dell’s Davis Cup teammates Arthur Ashe and Stan Smith. At its peak, ProServ represented more than 200 professional athletes and coaches, including Michael Jordan, Patrick Ewing, Stan Smith, Arthur Ashe, and Jimmy Connors. The company also managed and promoted professional sporting events and created ProServ Television to handle sports television production and rights representation.

Craighill died on December 25, 2025, at the age of 86.
