= Fort Howard, Maryland =

Unincorporated community in Maryland, United States

- Census-designated place
- Location within the State of Maryland Fort Howard (the United States)
- Coordinates: 39°12′26″N 076°26′42″W
- Country: United States
- State: Maryland
- County: Baltimore

Area
  - Total: 0.143 sq mi (.370 km^{2})
  - Land: 0.075 sq mi (.194 km^{2})
  - Water: 0.068 sq mi (.176 km^{2})
- Elevation: 13 ft (4.0 m)

Population (2010)
  - Total: 303
  - Density: 7,840/sq mi (3,027/km^{2})
- Time zone: UTC-5 (Eastern (EST))
  - Summer (DST): UTC-4 (EDT)
- ZIP code: 21052
- Area codes: 410,443 and 667
- GNIS feature ID: 590227

Fort Howard is an unincorporated community and census-designated place in Baltimore County, Maryland, United States. The population was 303 at the 2010 census. The median age is 47.9. 52.86% are female and 47.14% are male. 58.9% are married and 41.1% are single. The average household size is 2.64.

== Geography ==
Fort Howard, Maryland, is located at 39.2073° N, 76.4450° W.

According to the United States Census Bureau, the CDP has a total area of .143 square mile, of which .075 square mile is land and .068 square mile, or 47.3% is water.

Fort Howard is geographically situated at the confluence of the lower Patapsco River, which flows into the Chesapeake Bay, and the Back River, which form the east and south shores of the North Point peninsula with the western shore bound by Old Road Bay. North Point was named by Captain Robert North (1793), who owned a 50-acre patent at the south-most tip, where he launched his ship the Content.

== Demographics ==
As of the census of 2010, there were 303 people, 86 households, and 75 families residing in the CDP. The population density was 7,840 inhabitants per square mile (3,030/km^{2}). There were housing units at an average density of 2/sq mi (134.4/km^{2}). The racial makeup of the CDP was 100% white.

== History ==
The area was occupied by the tribes of the Susquehannock Indians since the last Ice Age. First explored by European John Smith in 1608, when while conducting an expedition up the Chesapeake Bay he landed on the area known as the Patapsco Neck. In 1664 Thomas Todd of Virginia patented 1,150 acres (4.7 km2) of land on the Patapsco Neck, this being the first deed in Baltimore County. The Todd family farmhouse is today a nationally registered landmark with the National Park Service on the North Point State Park. It is known today as the Todd Farmhouse or "Todd's Inheritance".

The North Point peninsula was settled beginning in the 1660s by families with various land grants from King Charles I and the lord proprietor of the Province of Maryland, Cecilius Calvert, 2nd Baron Baltimore (1605–1675), and his brother Leonard Calvert (1606–1647), who served as the first governor.

Fort Howard is the location of the actual artillery installation of 1898, Fort Howard, a Baltimore County Designated Historic Park Landmark granted to Baltimore County in 1973 by the federal government under a national park program initiated during the Johnson administration. Fort Howard Park is a former military establishment from the late 1890s to World War I, and the site of a British Army and Royal Navy landing during the War of 1812 to attack Baltimore, and the Battle of North Point on September 12, 1814.
