= Battery Gunnison =

Battery John Gunnison / New Fremont Peck
- Fort Hancock, New Jersey

Site information
- Controlled by: US National Park Service
- Open to the public: Yes
- Condition: Under Ongoing Restoration, c. 2003

Location
- Location within New Jersey
- Coordinates: 40.460042°N 73.995484°W

Site history
- Built: 1904
- In use: 1904-1948
- Materials: Concrete
- Events: The Army Ground Forces Association hosts monthly Work Weekends, which are open to the public, to support the restoration of the battery, as well as spring and fall living-history programs; the National Park Service also hosts additional tours and educational programs at the battery throughout the year.

Garrison information
- Occupants: Army Ground Forces Association (https://www.armygroundforces.org)

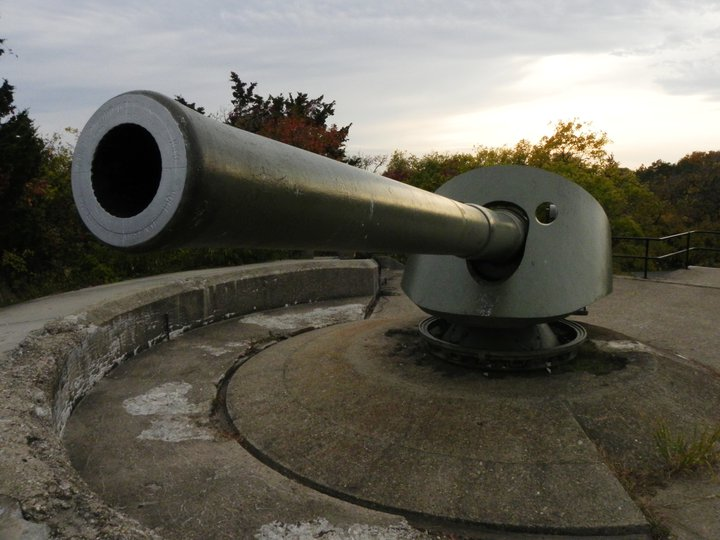
6-Inch Gun M1900, Serial Number 23; made at Watervliet Arsenal in Albany, NY in 1903; mounted on M1900 Barbette Carriage in Emplacement Number 1 of Battery Gunnison / New Peck.

Battery John Gunnison, known as Battery New Peck following its modernization in 1943, is a six-inch US Army coast artillery gun emplacement located at Fort Hancock in New Jersey.

== History ==
Battery John Gunnison was built in 1904 as a rapid fire twin six inch disappearing gun battery. It was named in honor of Captain John Williams Gunnison, a US Army topographical engineer, who was attacked and murdered by Indians during an expedition in Utah on October 26, 1853. The two M1903 six-inch guns, mounted on counter-weight disappearing carriages, were medium caliber weapons that could be fired rapidly at faster moving enemy vessels, such as patrol boats, destroyers, or minesweepers.

In 1943, the battery was extensively modified both internally and externally for two M1900 six inch barbette (pedestal mounted) guns, two shell hoists and a modern and expanded Plotting Room. The guns were moved from (old) Battery Fremont Peck to Battery Gunnison's location gaining a better field of fire. The battery was then renamed — Battery "New Peck." Initially, Battery Peck was named for Lieutenant Fremont Pearsons Peck, a US Army Ordnance Corps officer killed at Sandy Hook Proving Ground in a weapons testing explosion on February 19, 1895. The now-vacant Battery Peck emplacement was then modified as well, for .90 mm M1 Anti-Motor Torpedo Boat guns.

Following conversion, which was completed by the summer of 1943, Battery New Peck became the Examination battery for the Advanced Harbor Entrance Control Post No. 1, located on the roof of Battery Potter, also at Fort Hancock. This was one of three harbor entrance control posts operating in New York Harbor. The primary command and control post was located within Fort Tompkins, an older masonry coast defense fort dating from the 1840s, located high on the bluffs on the Fort Wadsworth reservation in Staten Island, with vantages overlooking the entire harbor and all sea approaches. The second was the Advanced Harbor Entrance Control Post No. 1 at Fort Hancock, which was responsible for confirming the identification of every last Allied ship within all convoys, as well as other vessels, as they entered into New York Harbor from the open ocean, all as the U-boat War and the Battle of the Atlantic raged off the Jersey Shore. Advanced Harbor Entrance Control Post No. 2 was at Fort Tilden on Long Island, and supervised the out-bound convoys heading out to sea. These were no small feats, as convoys could have an average number of over 100 ships.

Twenty-four hours a day, New York Harbor hummed with hundreds of fully laden ammunition ships, fuel tankers, freighters, and troop ships. These were supplied by a hub of highways and railroads connecting factories and refineries, all leading into massive storage facilities ringing the harbor in New York and New Jersey. With 60% of all Allied war material destined for Africa, the Mediterranean, and the European Theater leaving from New York, Brigadier General Philip S. Gage, Sr, the New York Harbor Defense Commander, testified before Congress, stating, "I am the defender of twenty million people and the industrial heartland of the nation."

The primary threat to all American harbors at this time was commerce raiding and blockships, which could offer a far more devastating attack than that of a conventional warship. With such a high concentration of war material in so dense an area, if a Merchant raider could sneak past the harbor forts disguised as an Allied vessel, they could barrage the harbor infrastructure and supply depots with deck guns in a surprise attack. A blockship attack was also greatly feared. The US Navy reported to the US Army harbor defense command that a scuttled enemy vessel in the outer harbor in deep water would take a minimum of thirty days to raise or clear. With the Ambrose Channel blocked, this would effectively bring the flow of supplies going overseas to a halt for a month. Therefore, maximum effort was taken to ensure that only Allied vessels would gain entrance to the harbors.

As ships approached New York Harbor, they would be flashed a challenge code from the Advanced Harbor Entrance Control Post No. 1 via signal lamp; signal flags could also be used. Vessels that got their challenge code reply wrong, failed to follow protocol, or simply acted suspiciously, would be ordered to halt, pending an immediate investigation and inspection via boarding, conducted by the US Navy and/or US Coast Guard. This order would also be issued in conjunction from the examination vessel, anchored near the mouth of the Ambrose Channel. A US Navy destroyer or a US Coast Guard cutter would often be orbiting the area as a guard ship, supporting the Examination vessel.

If a vessel still failed to stop, and ignored the Guard ship and Examination vessel, Battery Gunnison / New Peck would be been alerted via telephone by the Harbor Entrance Control Post No. 1; a description of the vessel's class, paint scheme, national flag flown, speed, and proximity to the nearest buoy in either the Ambrose or Sandy Hook Ship Channels.

Observers in fire control towers assigned to Battery Gunnison / New Peck would immediately begin tracking the ship, and relaying information to the Battery's plotting room. Once the proper calculations were made, the ship would be brought under fire via "bring to" shots fired by the battery. These were warning shots using inert shells, fired well in front of the vessel, straight into the water, to get its attention with the shell splash. If the vessel still failed to heave-to at this time, Battery Peck would begin "destructive fire" with armor-piercing, high-explosive ammunition to neutralize the threat before it could get close enough to attack the harbor or scuttle in one of channels. The Jersey shore was considered a full war-zone during World War II, and operations at Fort Hancock were on a "Shoot First - Ask Later" mindset in dealing with potential threats.

So tense was the nature of the defense, and so real the threat, that from September 1943, and September 1944, Battery Gunnison / New Peck would open fire on thirteen separate occasions. On each occasion, the vessels turned out to be Allied ships. The battery remained on 24-hour alert status through the end of World War 2.

Battery New Peck was put into caretaker status following the end of World War II in 1945. It fired for the last time in 1948, when a Reserve Officer Training Corps Coast Artillery class came to Fort Hancock and performed annual summer target practice. Although the coastal defense component of Fort Hancock's history ended in 1948, it remained on active duty as an Air Defense Artillery post from the early 1950s to 1974 with anti-aircraft guns, and later on, Nike Ajax and Hercules missiles. In the early 1960s, the two M1900 guns and carriages were removed from the battery and brought down to a government storage facility in Maryland, pending their placement in a military museum that was yet to be built. The roof of now empty Battery Gunnison / New Peck structure was used as a recreational trap-shooting range for the soldiers at Fort Hancock.

In 1974, Fort Hancock closed, and was ceded to the National Park Service as part of Gateway National Recreation Area. The two M1900 rifles and carriages were still in storage in Maryland, where they had been for nearly a decade; the museum where they were to be placed was never built. The National Park Service quickly worked with the US Army to have them returned, and the guns and carriages came home on a bitterly cold day in February 1976. For the next 27 years, and stripped of all its original equipment save for the two shot hoists, sand, grit, salt corrosion, and vandalism took a heavy toll on the battery and the guns.

== Restoration and preservation ==
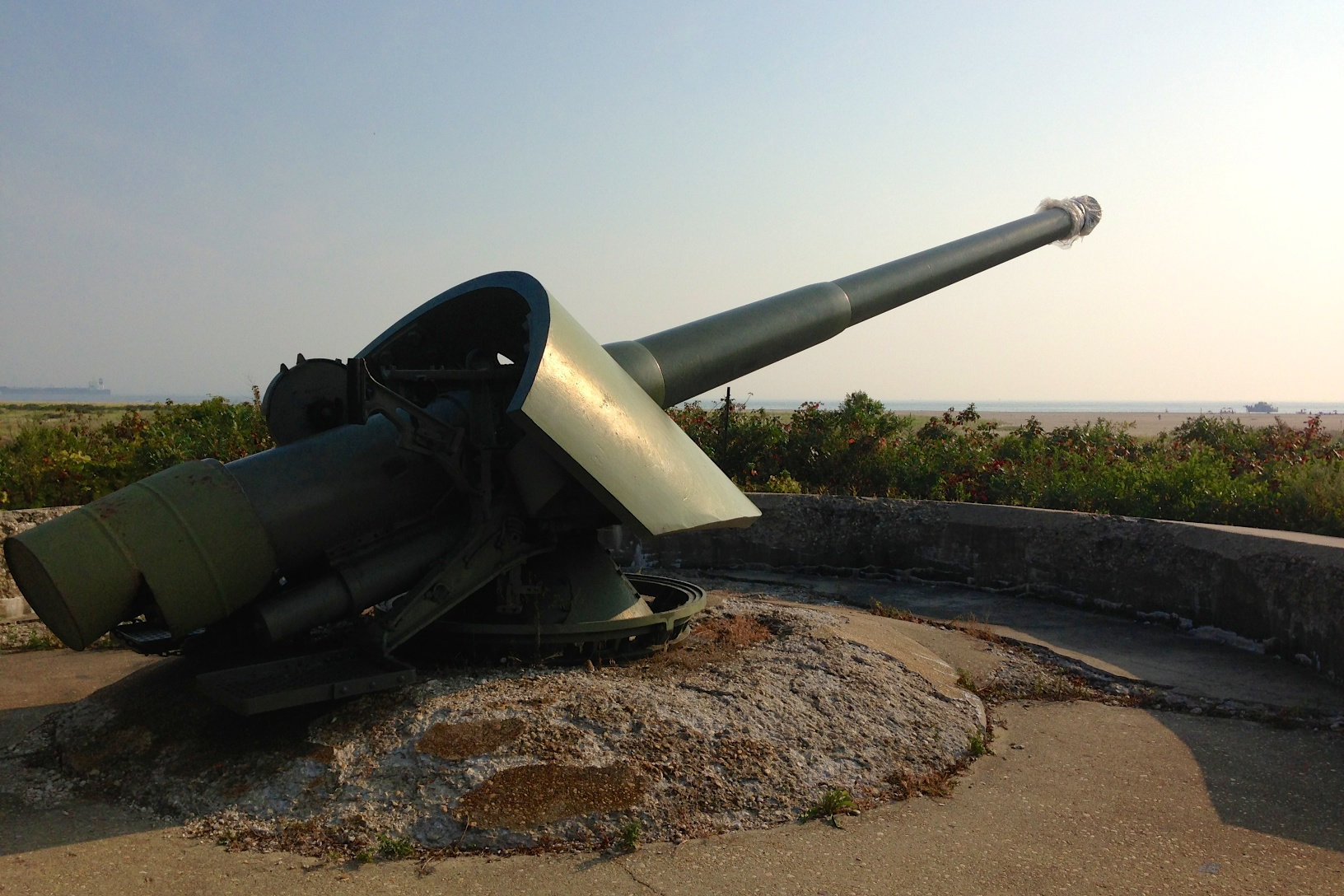
Restored 6-inch rifled gun on model 1900 pedestal mount at Battery Gunnison/New Peck

In 2003, the Army Ground Forces Association, a non-profit 501(c)3 living history group, began to volunteer at the battery, and transformed the structure from two rusty cannons and a time and nature-worn concrete artillery emplacement to the most extensively preserved and restored seacoast battery in the United States. While other coastal batteries around the nation - Battery 519 at Ft Miles, DE; Battery Osgood-Farley, Ft. MacArthur, CA; Battery Worth, Ft. Casey, WA; as well as several others - have been well preserved, with some form of ordinance in their emplacements (non-correct display weaponry), or offer extensive museum displays of artifacts in the battery's rooms, only Battery Gunnison/New Peck is preserved and restored as a seacoast battery.

Of all former concrete seacoast artillery emplacements in the United States, it is the only battery to offer the full spectrum of ammunition service, correct weaponry, and a working range section. Both guns have been restored so visitors can traverse (turn) the guns, and articulate the breech blocks. Original Army spotting telescopes dating to the 1940s allow visitors to view and track ships on the horizon. Internally, the battery is lit with original 100-year-old Army Corps of Engineers electrical fixtures. The powder and shell magazines are filled with inert (non-functioning) six inch shell bodies and powder canisters. In the Plotting Room, an M3 plotting board has been recreated, as well as other pre-computer devices for tabulating mathematical solutions for the guns. Visitors can talk to one another at all locations, as the telephone network has also been rebuilt, using vintage EE-91 Coast Artillery telephones.

In the spring of 2017, a restoration milestone was achieved when the concrete ammunition bridges leading from the ammunition shot hoists to the gun platforms were reintroduced. In November 2017, the battery commander's station stairs were custom fabricated and installed. Another key project, the reintroduction of period-correct exterior lighting, which was begun in the summer of 2015, and was completed in October 2019. The wooden range display board operator's platform, part of the 1943 modernization, was reconstructed and built from scratch using the original plans, and completed in July and August 2019. The Army Ground Forces Association generally hosts one work weekend a month, which is open to the public. They also host two "living history" events a year, held in May and October. "Coastal Defense Weekend," held on Armed Forces Day Weekend (the weekend prior to Memorial Day Weekend), and "Fort Hancock Day," in October, which commemorates the founding of the Fort Hancock on October 30, 1895. All work days and living history events are posted by the National Park Service with the program guides getting updated quarterly for the spring, summer, fall and winter time periods. Army Ground Forces Association members are uniformed as members of the 245th Coast Artillery Regiment, which manned Battery New Peck in 1943, and give Lantern Tours, historical displays, and gun drills with the M1900s.

== See also ==
- Gunnison Beach, which takes its name from Battery Gunnison.
- List of coastal fortifications of the United States
