= Fort Hancock and the Sandy Hook Proving Ground Historic District =

Historic district in New Jersey, United States

- U.S. National Register of Historic Places
- U.S. National Historic Landmark District
- New Jersey Register of Historic Places
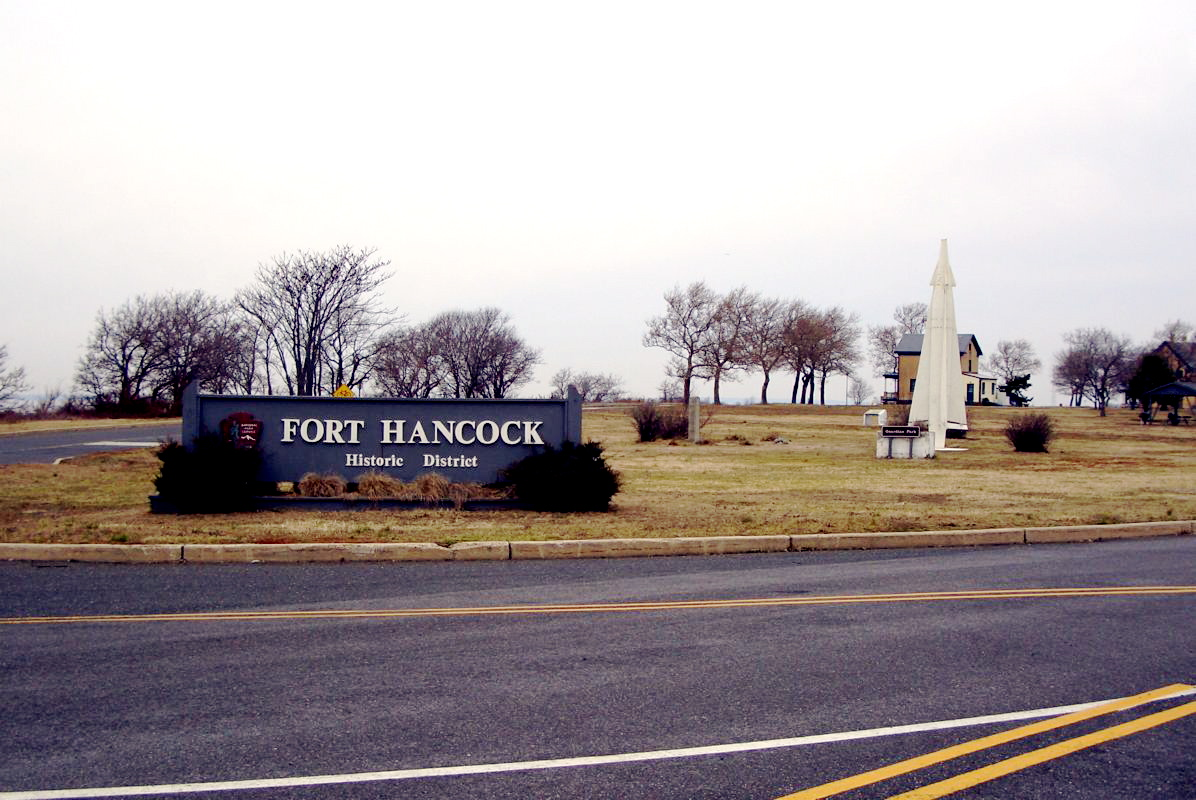

- Location within Monmouth County, New Jersey Location within New Jersey Location within the United States
- Location: Sandy Hook, New Jersey
- Coordinates: 40°26′41″N 73°59′44″W
- Area: 4,584 acres (1,855 ha)
- Built: 1859
- Built by: United States Army
- NRHP reference No.: 80002505
- NJRHP No.: 2024

Significant dates
- Added to NRHP: April 24, 1980
- Designated NHLD: December 17, 1982
- Designated NJRHP: October 3, 1980

Fort Hancock and the Sandy Hook Proving Ground Historic District is a National Historic Landmark District that includes Fort Hancock and the Sandy Hook Proving Ground on Sandy Hook in Middletown Township, Monmouth County, New Jersey, United States. The district was added to the National Register of Historic Places on April 24, 1980, and designated a National Historic Landmark on December 17, 1982. It is part of Gateway National Recreation Area, administered by the National Parks of New York Harbor office of the National Park Service.

== Sandy Hook Proving Ground ==
Sandy Hook Proving Ground was founded in 1874 for the testing and development of artillery. It served in this role until 1918–19, a period which included the nation's rise to a position of global power. Weapons developed here were deployed for use both as coastal defenses elsewhere in the United States, and by the United States Army for field use. Surviving buildings associated with its use include test batteries, magazines, and a gun park, as well as bombproof observation structures and target platforms. The Sandy Hook property also includes an early life saving station built by the United States Life-Saving Service (a predecessor to the United States Coast Guard), and the 1764 Sandy Hook Light, the nation's oldest working lighthouse.

== Fort Hancock ==
Fort Hancock is the name given to the series of coastal defenses located at Sandy Hook. As it overlooks the approaches to New York Harbor, the area has been of military importance since colonial days, and has been home to a succession of defense establishments. Most of the surviving structures date to the Endicott Period beginning in the 1890s, when the area was formally named Fort Hancock. Earlier surviving structures include a single bastion from a fort dating to the period of the American Civil War. Completed in 1868, the fort was declared obsolete in the 1890s and most of it was torn down to reuse its stone. Although most of the surviving structures at the fort date to before World War II, the grounds also includes a Nike missile site from the 1950s Cold War period.
