= National Parks of New York Harbor =

Office of the National Park Service

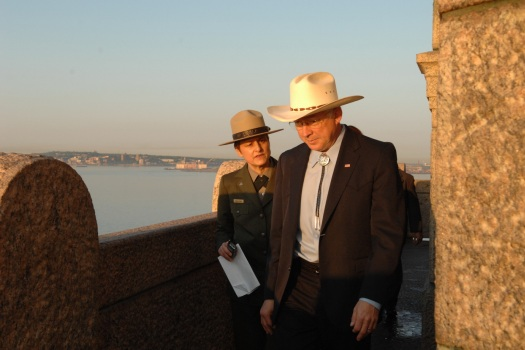
Maria Burks, commissioner of the National Parks of New York Harbor, and Secretary of the Interior Ken Salazar at the Statue of Liberty in May 2009

National Parks of New York Harbor is an office of the National Park Service that coordinates administration of eleven NPS sites, including 23 unique destinations located in the New York metropolitan area. National Parks of New York Harbor was formed in 2003 and administers properties ranging from the Statue of Liberty National Monument in New York Harbor to Gateway National Recreation Area in several locations and Saint Paul's Church National Historic Site in Mount Vernon, New York. Despite its name, technically the office does not oversee any national parks, but rather national monuments, national memorials, national historic sites, and a large national recreation area. Properties overseen by the office make up 27,000 acres (110 km^{2}) and attract more than 12 million visitors each year. They are served by a visitor center at Federal Hall National Memorial.

== History ==
The National Parks of New York Harbor umbrella was created in September 2003 as a means of drawing more visitors to the National Park Service properties in the New York City region. The organizers' primary concern was the under-visitation of the parks that comprise the Gateway National Recreation Area, one of the first urban parks when it was created, rather than the acquisition of parkland. Maria Burks, the first Commissioner, was charged with increasing awareness of park units other than the Statue of Liberty and Ellis Island, and saw the solution to this problem as increasing the number of ferries that connect and serve the properties. As a result, when the ferry contract for the Statue of Liberty was up for bid, a discussion occurred about asking interested parties to include increased harbor service as part of their packages, but this request did not receive much focus in the end.

Part of Federal Hall National Memorial was repurposed as a new visitors' center in late 2006 to meet the needs of the organization's diverse properties and the visitors thereto and the center has been used as a forum for visitor input into National Park Service programming.

== Sites ==
As of 2017, sites included:

=== New York Harbor ===
- Statue of Liberty National Monument
  - Statue of Liberty
  - Ellis Island
- Governors Island National Monument

=== Manhattan ===
- Federal Hall National Memorial
- Castle Clinton National Monument
- Hamilton Grange National Historic Site
- General Grant National Memorial
- Theodore Roosevelt Birthplace National Historic Site
- African Burial Ground National Monument
- Stonewall National Monument

and an affiliate, the Lower East Side Tenement Museum

=== Jamaica Bay ===
- Canarsie Pier
- Floyd Bennett Field
- Jamaica Bay Wildlife Refuge
- Jacob Riis Park/Fort Tilden

=== Staten Island ===
- Fort Wadsworth
- Miller Field
- Great Kills Park

=== Sandy Hook ===
- Fort Hancock
- Sandy Hook Lighthouse
- Gunnison Beach

=== Mount Vernon, New York ===
- Saint Paul's Church National Historic Site

== Fire suppression ==
Many of the National Park Service (NPS) sites in New York and New Jersey maintain structural firefighters or wildland firefighters depending on the type of the site.

- Structural fire suppression for the Statue of Liberty (Liberty Island) is provided by the City Of New York Fire Department and by the Jersey City Fire Department at Ellis Island. Initial and supplemental support is provided by the National Park Service which created the Statue of Liberty Fire Brigade in 2011. The Statue of Liberty Fire Brigade consists of a crew of federal NPS firefighters who are trained and certified as Structural Firefighter I, Structural Firefighter II and Wildland Firefighters.
- Fire suppression for Sandy Hook National Recreation area is provided solely by the National Park Service Sandy Hook Fire Brigade and an NPS Wildland Fire Crew with Wildfire Brush Truck is maintained year-round in Staten Island for the Staten Island Gateway Sites. For additional wildland fire support on large fires (such as the fires at Great Kills Park in recent years) firefighters from the Statue of Liberty Fire Brigade and the Sandy Hook Fire Department have responded to supplement the NPS wildland firefighters assigned to Staten Island.
- Fire suppression for Governors Island is provided by the Fire Department of the City of New York.

== Emergency medical services ==
- Emergency medical care on Liberty Island and Ellis Island is provided year-round by National Park Service Emergency Medical Technicians. Patient transports are coordinated with Jersey City Medical Center Ambulances but emergency response and patient care on the islands falls solely upon the National Park Service Emergency Medical Technicians.
- Emergency medical care at Gateway parks in Brooklyn and Staten Island is provided jointly by seasonal National Park Service Emergency Medical Technicians and the City Of New York.
- Emergency medical care at Governors Island and Manhattan sites are provided by contracted "Senior Care EMS" Emergency Medical Technicians.

== Conservancy ==
The National Parks of New York Harbor Conservancy is a 501(c)(3) non-profit organization with offices on Wall Street in New York that works in partnership with the National Parks of New York Harbor. Its 2006, revenues (mostly donations) were $1.255 million.

Among its programs are a tour of the forts that comprise the harbor properties and efforts to deepen the connections between Gateway and the other properties in the harbor.
