= Fort Hancock U.S. Life Saving Station =

- U.S. National Register of Historic Places
- New Jersey Register of Historic Places

- Location within Monmouth County, New Jersey Location within New Jersey Location within the United States
- Nearest city: Highlands, New Jersey
- Coordinates: 40°25′36.1″N 73°59′3.5″W
- Area: 2 acres (0.81 ha)
- Built: 1894
- NRHP reference No.: 81000080
- NJRHP No.: 2025

Significant dates
- Added to NRHP: November 30, 1981
- Designated NJRHP: March 15, 1976

The Fort Hancock U.S. Life Saving Station, also known as Spermaceti Cove No. 2 Life-Saving Service Station, is located on Sandy Hook, north of Highlands, New Jersey. Originally built on the grounds of Fort Hancock, the area has been part of the Sandy Hook Unit of Gateway National Recreation Area since 1974.

A United States Life-Saving Service station was first located in the area in 1848 or 1849. The current structure was built in 1894 about 1,000 feet (305 m) from the 1848 site. It is a 1 1/2-story shingle-style building with a boathouse and a four-story tower. When the Life-Saving Service was merged into the United States Coast Guard in 1915, the site became a Coast Guard Station until decommissioned in 1949. It later served as administrative offices for a New Jersey state park, and, beginning in 1974, as a visitors' center for Gateway NRA. It was added to the National Register of Historic Places on November 30, 1981.

== See also ==
- National Register of Historic Places listings in Monmouth County, New Jersey
