= Gunnison Beach =

Beach in New Jersey, United States

Coordinates: 40°27′36″N 73°59′44″W

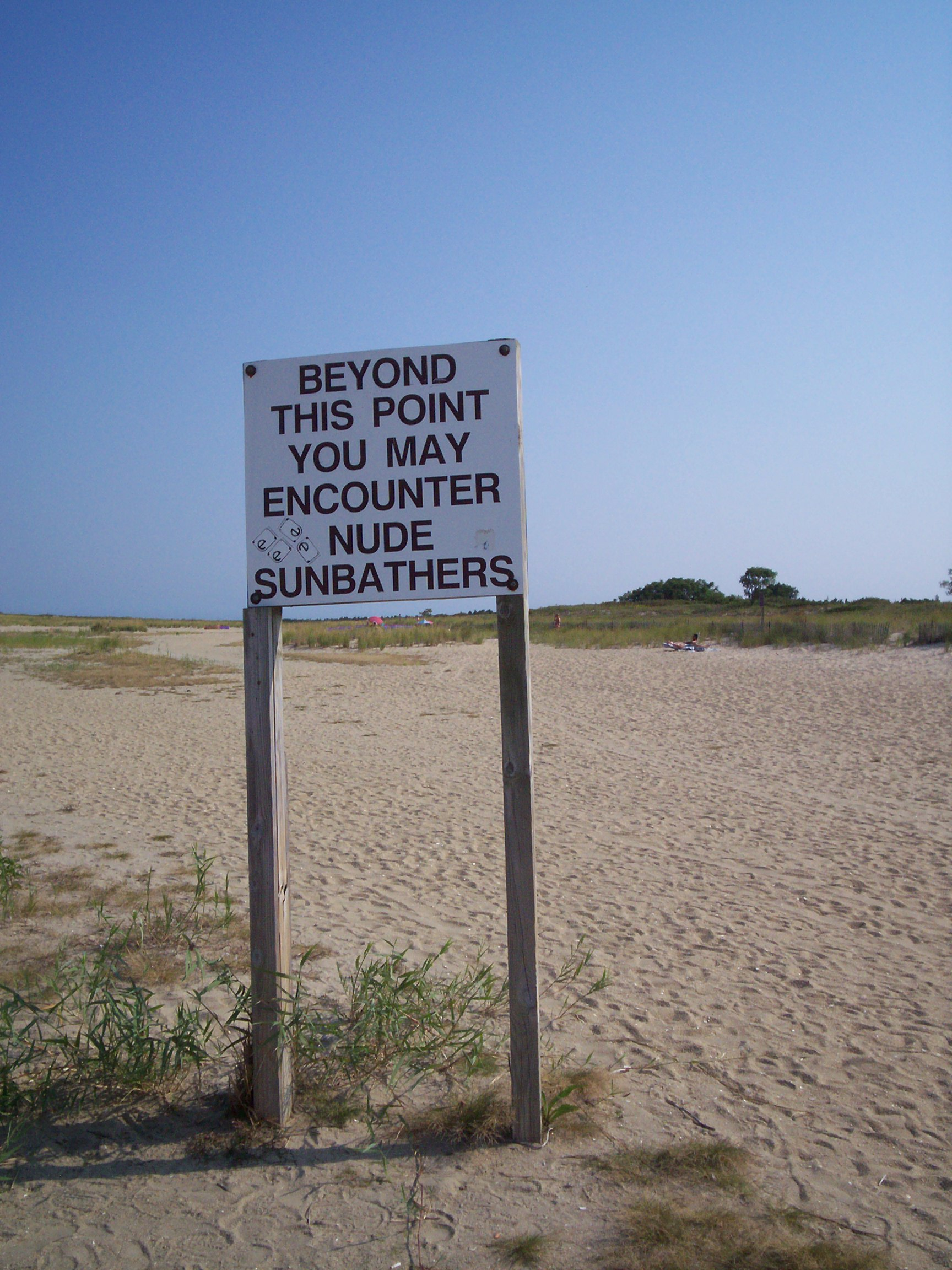
Gunnison Beach, Sandy Hook

Gunnison Beach is a beach within the Sandy Hook unit of the Fort Hancock and the Sandy Hook Proving Ground Historic District which is the Sandy Hook Unit of Gateway National Recreation Area, on the Atlantic coast of New Jersey. It is located in Middletown Township, Monmouth County, but is on federal land managed by the National Park Service. It is New Jersey's only legal clothing-optional beach. It takes its name from adjacent Battery Gunnison, which visitors must pass next to in order to get to and from the beach.

== History ==
Gunnison Beach takes its name purely out of convenience: Battery Gunnison, a Coastal Artillery fortification built by the U.S. Army in 1904 to protect New York Harbor at Fort Hancock, New Jersey. The Battery, which has been undergoing an extensive restoration to its c. 1943 configuration since 2003, sits directly next to the Gunnison Beach walkway that leads out to the ocean. Beach goers and visitors must pass directly next to the Battery's Number 2 Gun Emplacement to walk out to the ocean. Known as Battery Gunnison / New Peck following a weapons conversion in 1943, it is part of Fort Hancock, the largest US Army Coast Artillery fort on the eastern seaboard. The Sandy Hook Proving Ground, the first of its kind in the nation, operated at Fort Hancock / Sandy Hook from 1874 to 1919. The U.S. Army manned Fort Hancock as a Coast Artillery post from 1890 to 1948. It was then armed with conventional anti-aircraft guns from 1950 to 1954, when it became the site of a Nike missile defense installation. The Fort closed in 1974, and was ceded to the National Park Service as a unit of Gateway National Recreation Area. Contrary to popular belief and urban legend, there was no nude bathing en masse on the part of the United States Army garrison that led to the formation of the nude beach. It was the discovery of Gunnison Beach's natural seclusion by park visitors in the late 1970s and early 1980s that led to its inception as a nude beach.

In 1999, New Jersey passed a law that allows municipalities and counties to prohibit all types of nudism on state or local beaches in their jurisdiction. Gunnison Beach, however, is on land owned and managed by the federal government and therefore is not subject to state or local regulations. As a result, Gunnison became the only legal nude beach in the state. Gunnison is the largest clothing-optional recreation area on the East Coast. The clothing-optional beach, which offers dramatic views of Brooklyn and the Verrazzano–Narrows Bridge, attracts nearly 5,000 naturists per weekend in the summer months. From May through September, daily ferry service is available from Manhattan to the Sandy Hook Ferry Landing, with a free shuttle service that stops at all the beaches of Sandy Hook. Gunnison Beach is among the most popular choices, especially on weekends. Part of the beach is shared on a seasonal basis with a reserved breeding ground for the endangered piping plover, a native shore bird.
