= National Parks of New York Harbor Conservancy =

The National Parks of New York Harbor Conservancy is a 501(c)(3) non-profit organization with offices on Wall Street in Manhattan, New York City, that works in partnership with the National Parks of New York Harbor (NPNH). Its 2006 revenues (mostly donations) were $1.255 million.

The conservancy embodies a public-private partnership with the NPNH, sanctioned as its primary partner under a U.S. Department of the Interior General Agreement. The NPNH is a designation given to the 10 national park system units making up 23 unique destinations in four boroughs of New York City (Manhattan, Queens, Brooklyn and Staten Island), Westchester, and New Jersey. These sites spread around New York Harbor include such icons as the Statue of Liberty and Ellis Island and host approximately 12 million visitors annually.

== Goal ==
The National Parks of New York Harbor Conservancy states as its primary goal the forging of increased waterborne transportation connections to inner and outer harbor park destinations. The Conservancy is also involved in the development of programs, capital projects and activities aimed at thematically connecting the sites to each other and to other places on the waterfront.

== History ==
The Conservancy’s founders are Marian Sulzberger Heiskell, David Rockefeller, Jr. and Marie Salerno. The entity is a founding member of the City of New York’s Harbor District Advisory Board, a consortium of inner harbor parks in support of cooperative initiatives including transportation linkages among federal, state and city parks.
