= Sandy Hook Proving Ground =

Former US Army facility in New Jersey

- United States
- Sandy Hook; Near Atlantic Highlands, New Jersey in United States
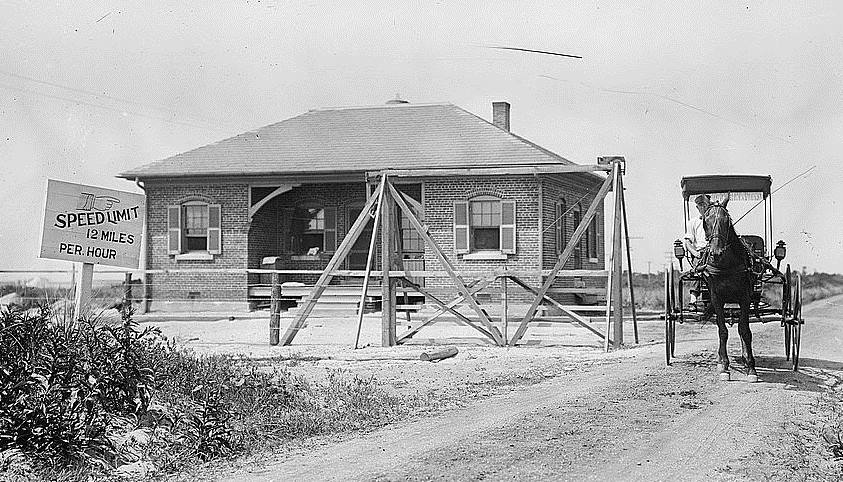
- Entrance (1911)

Site information
- Type: Proving ground
- Owner: United States Department of War
- Operator: United States Army
- Controlled by: U.S. Ordnance Department
- Open to the public: Yes, with restrictions
- Condition: Poor
- Adjoining facility: Fort Hancock

Location
- Location of the Proving Ground on Sandy Hook
- Coordinates: 40°28′2.852″N 73°59′57.203″W

Site history
- Built: August 7, 1874
- Built by: United States Army
- In use: 1876-1919
- Fate: Facilities relocated; buildings abandoned

Test information
- Other tests: Artillery
- Remediation: None
- Fort Hancock and the Sandy Hook Proving Ground Historic District
- U.S. National Historic Landmark District – Contributing property
- U.S. Historic district – Contributing property
- Visitation: 6,021,713 (2014)
- Part of: Fort Hancock and the Sandy Hook Proving Ground Historic District (ID80002505)

Significant dates
- Designated NHLDCP: December 17, 1982
- Designated CP: April 24, 1980

The Sandy Hook Proving Ground was a military facility along the Atlantic coast of New Jersey established by the Secretary of War on August 7, 1874, to serve as the United States Army's first proving ground for the testing of ordnance and materiel. The facility was located at Sandy Hook, a narrow coastal spit of land, approximately 6 miles (9.7 km) in length and 0.5 miles (varying between 0.1 and 1 miles) wide, in Middletown Township in Monmouth County. The facility was operated in conjunction with the adjoining Fort Hancock. Essentially abandoned in 1919 for a larger facility, the area was left to degrade and most of the structures still remain today. The proving ground and parts of Fort Hancock are now property of the National Park Service and mostly closed to the public.

== Background ==
The Civil War, just ten years earlier, had introduced several new innovations in weaponry. Rifled cannon fired pointed-nosed projectiles farther and faster than cannonballs and ironclad warships with mounted guns that could destroy the walls of a traditional fort. The Army needed a place to test its own new weapons. The Sandy Hook Peninsula met the Army's needs for an experimental testing area for heavy ordnance and was on land that was already government owned, which provided flat and open areas for testing. Sandy Hook was distant enough to be far from towns but close enough to large cities and transportation by water. In 1874, most of Sandy Hook was covered with holly and cedar forests and tidal marshes which still cover a large percentage of it today. Most of the Federal development of the Hook was concentrated on the northern end. A huge granite five-bastioned fort near the northern end of the Hook dominated the area, even though it was still incomplete and was destined never to be completed. In addition to the fort, there was the Engineer's wharf, erected on the western shore in 1857, to accommodate the fort's construction, the Engineers' shop and quarters, and the Sandy Hook Life-Saving Station, established on the northeastern shore in 1854. It was decided to lay out the Proving Ground on the eastern margin of the Hook, just below the southeast bastion of a Civil War-era fort. The firing range was to extend southward along the beach with the facilities consisting of the wooden gun platforms of the proof battery, a bombproof, a frame instrument house, and sand butts on the firing range.

After its formal establishment in 1874, it was nearly two years before facilities were completed that allowed staffing and testing to reach its potential. Because of the period of time involved, the bulk of the weaponry designed, built and installed for coastal defense under both the Taft and Endicott Boards were tested at Sandy Hook. Over time, several red brick buildings, including structures used as maintenance buildings and an Officers Club, were built as part of the Proving Ground. When Fort Hancock was commissioned in 1895 as a Coast Artillery Post, it shared the peninsula with the Proving Ground.

== Proof Battery ==
The "Proof Battery," where new and converted guns would be fired, was built at the northeastern end of Sandy Hook along the ocean side. The firing range extended 3,000 yards (2,700 m) south along the beach and for long range test firing, guns would be aimed out to sea to provide the necessary distance. The first test firing took place in October 1874, when a 10-inch (25 cm) Rodman smoothbore cannon, converted into an 8-inch (20 cm) rifled gun, was fired. After firing 700 rounds, the Ordnance Board found the gun to still be "sound and serviceable."

To test the guns' striking power, armor-piercing projectiles were fired at large, thick iron plates, similar to those used in making warships. These tests proved that rifled Rodman guns could penetrate the armor but only at limited distances. In the 1880s, new high- powered, breech-loading rifled cannons made of steel were introduced. They had greater ranges and more striking power. When new models of guns and mortars passed their ordnance tests, they were mass-produced at gun foundries around the country and then sent to Sandy Hook for testing before being issued for use. Many new types of gunpowder, artillery shells, fuses and primers used to explode projectiles were also tested.

In 1900, Proof Battery was relocated because of Fort Hancock's need for the location to build a gun battery. The new Battery was built southeast of its old location. The eastern end of the new Proof Battery was designed for test firing machine guns, field and siege guns, and howitzers – larger guns like a 14-inch (36 cm) caliber – were test fired at the west end of the battery. In the middle were mounted a variety of guns from 1-to-12-inch (2.5 to 30.5 cm) caliber. When a gun was fired, the gun crew stood behind 12-foot (3.7 m) thick concrete walls in the niches in case the gun blew up during testing and personnel could watch from atop a 50-foot (15 m) observation tower behind the traverses.

== Base railroad ==
In 1889, a narrow gauge railroad was constructed to bring equipment and guns from the docks to the proof battery. In 1893, a standard gauge railroad was completed to the mainland and connected with commercial railroad lines that were originally built to allow civilians from steamships to travel down the shore. It is believed that the New Jersey Southern Railroad had a dock in Horseshoe Cove. The train would then take the tourists that came from New York City to destinations including Long Branch.

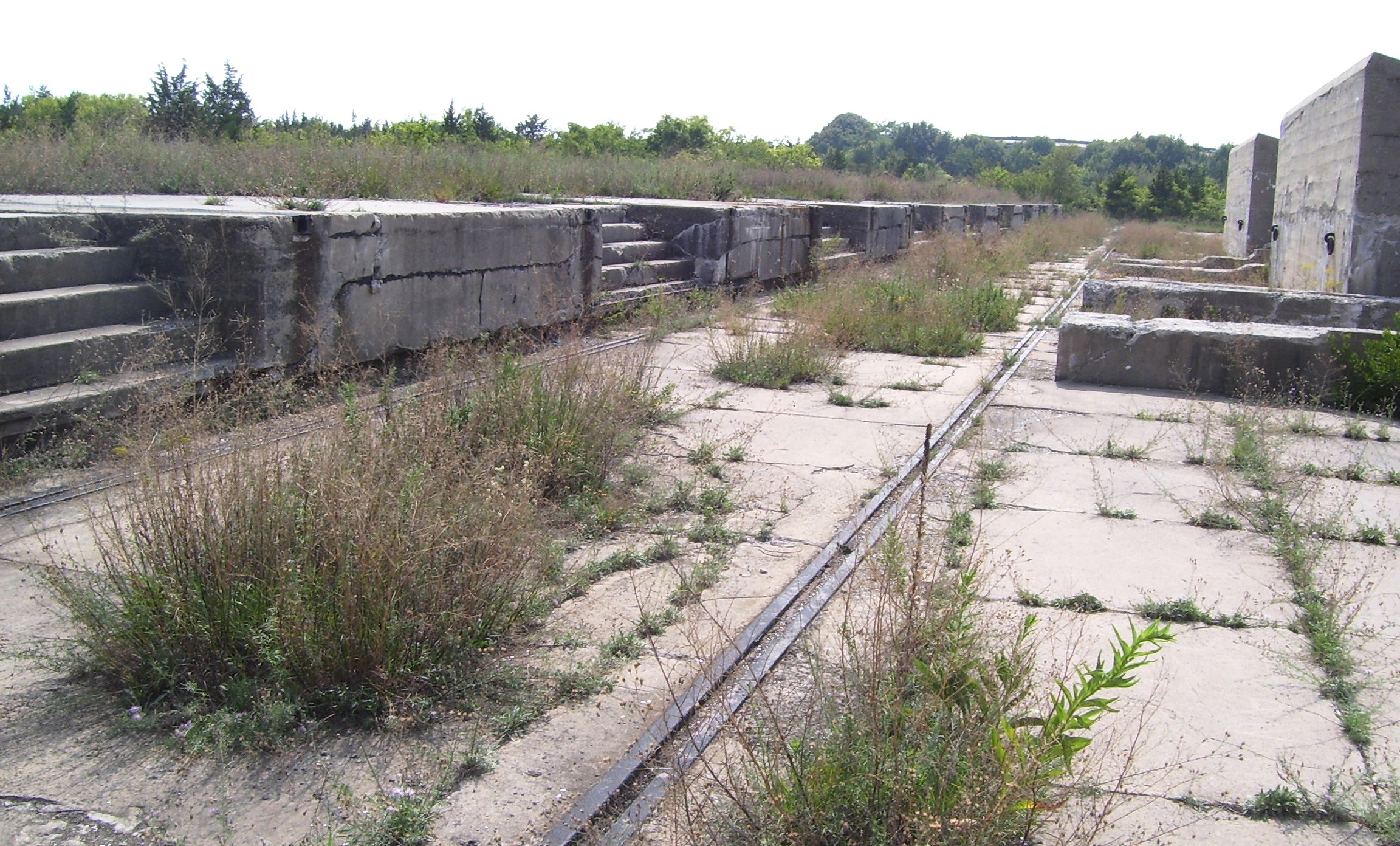
Abandoned gun platforms and traverses (protective walls, seen on the right) of the Sandy Hook Proving Ground. Soldiers used a 20-foot gantry crane on rails to lift guns and carriages onto the platforms to be tested, or "proved". These platforms were part of the "new" Proof Battery, established in 1901 because of boundary disputes with Fort Hancock, replacing the original proof battery, which operated from 1874 to 1900.

When Fort Hancock did not want civilians near its facilities, the civilian railroad was moved to a dock in the Spermaceti Cove vicinity and later removed altogether. Later, the Sandy Hook Proving Ground took over the railroad on the Hook, and utilized it for passenger, troop train, and railway gun movements. This also allowed for interchange with Class 1 railroads at Highlands, New Jersey. The Sandy Hook Proving Ground's engine was named "General Rodman". When they left circa 1920, the railroad operation was transferred to the engineer unit at Fort Hancock.

== Final years ==
Sandy Hook Proving Ground became a permanent installation in 1903 and continued to test weapons through World War I. During the war, the site was commanded by Colden Ruggles, who later served as the Army's Chief of Ordnance. A dual military command existed with the Sandy Hook Proving Ground – contained within the site of Fort Hancock – continuing to test ordnance equipment while the Coast Artillery Corps exercised the harbor defense mission for New York Harbor. However, as guns could hit targets further and further away, Sandy Hook lacked enough space to test new long-range guns. In 1919, when Sandy Hook could no longer contain the ever-increasing range of larger and more powerful weapons, testing was moved to the Aberdeen Proving Ground in Aberdeen, Maryland.

== Gallery ==
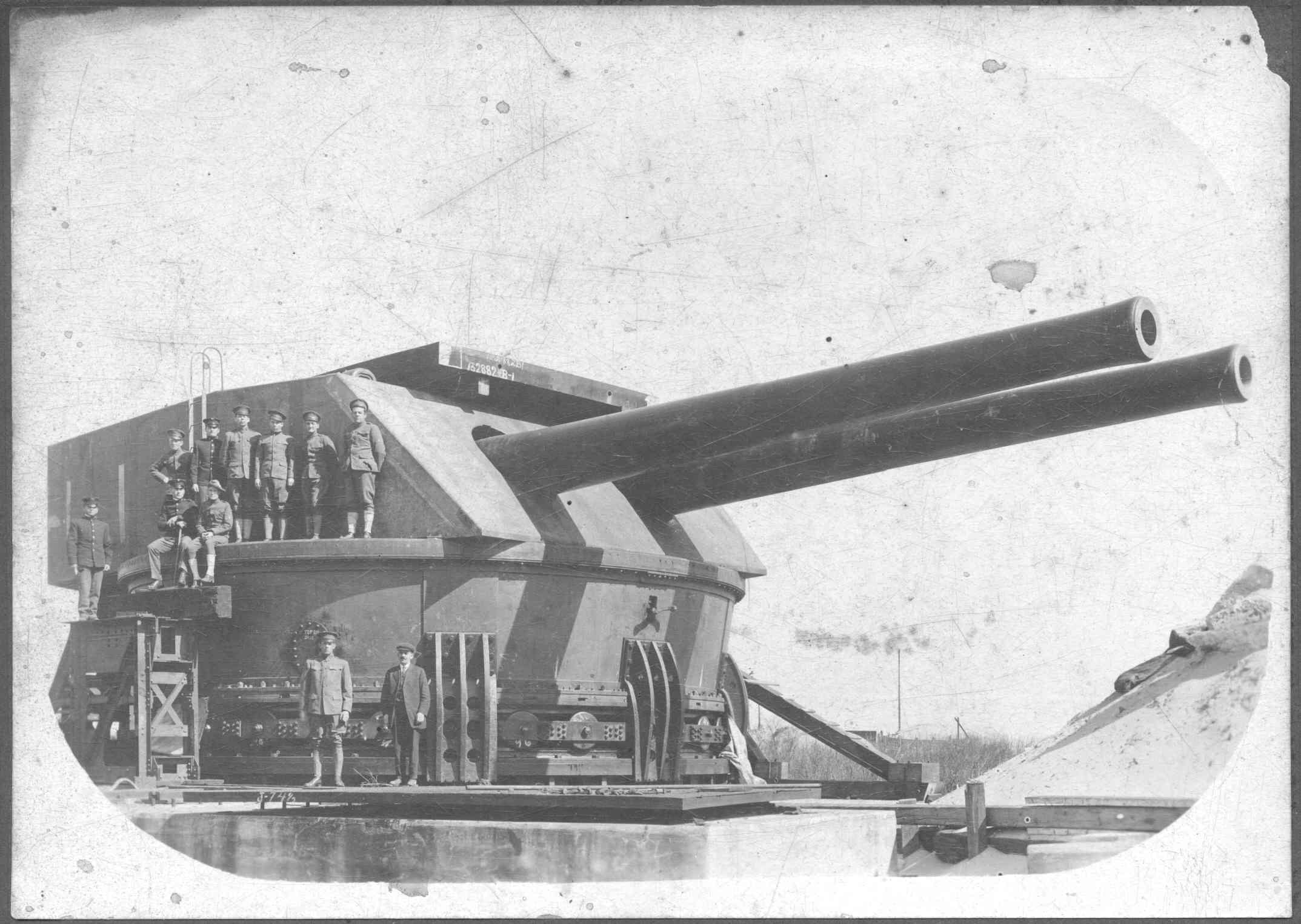
Twin 14-inch (356 mm) gun turret for Fort Drum undergoing tests at Sandy Hook Proving Ground.

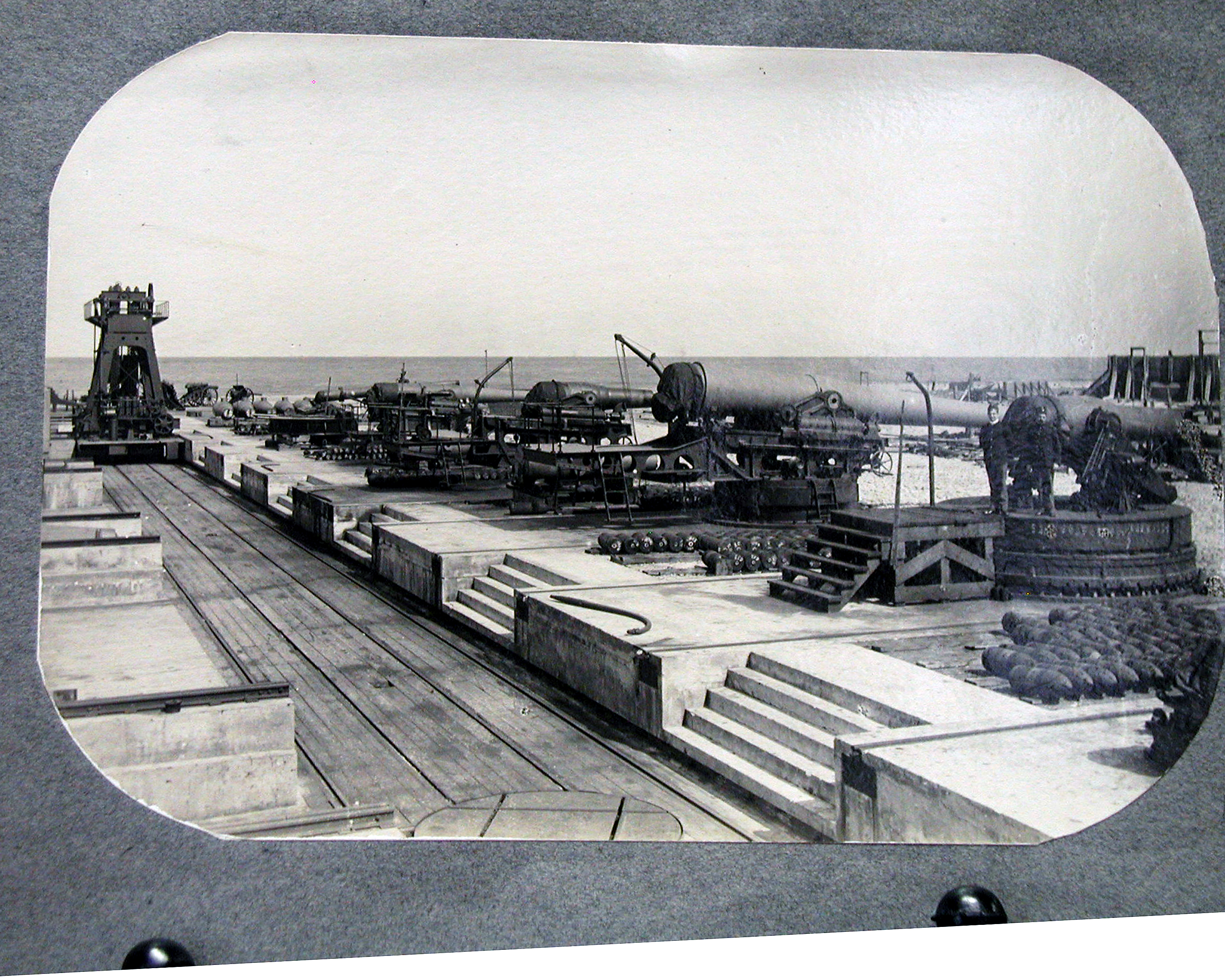
The Proof Battery circa 1900.

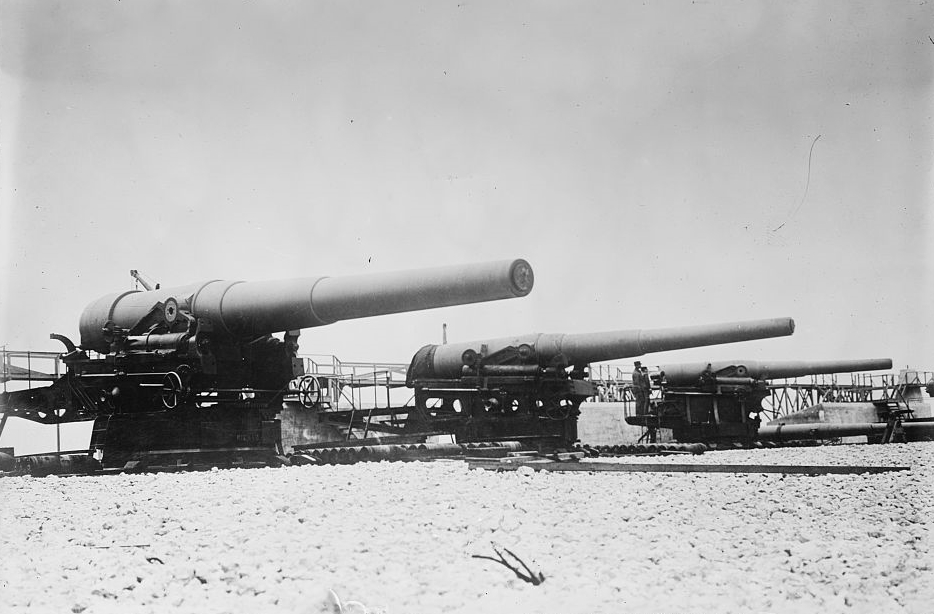
8" (203 mm), 10" (254 mm), and 12" (305 mm) guns on barbette carriages at Sandy Hook

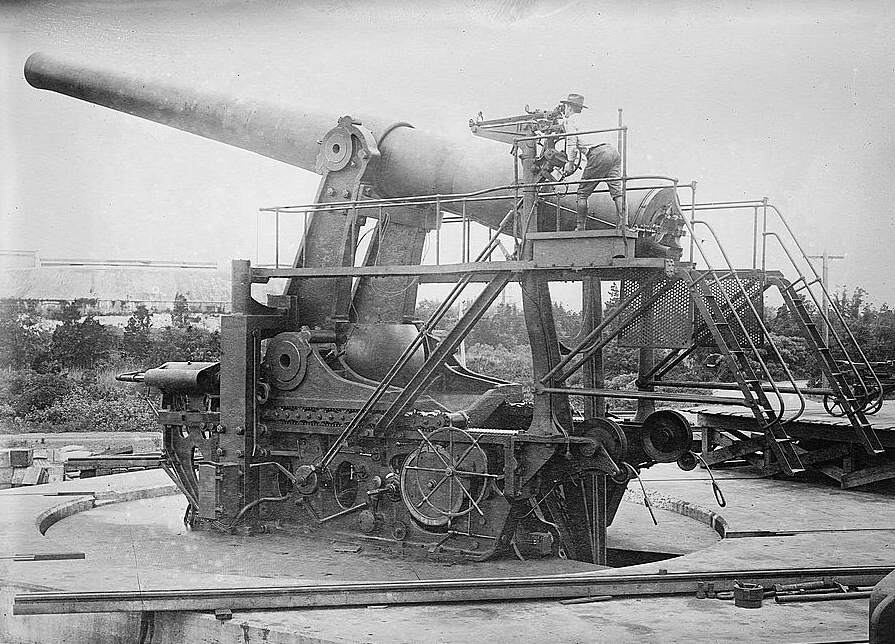
A 14" (356 mm) disappearing gun being tested at Sandy Hook
