= Fort Hancock (New Jersey) =

Former United States Army fort

- Fort Hancock and the Sandy Hook Proving Ground Historic District
- U.S. National Historic Landmark District – Contributing property
- U.S. Historic district – Contributing property
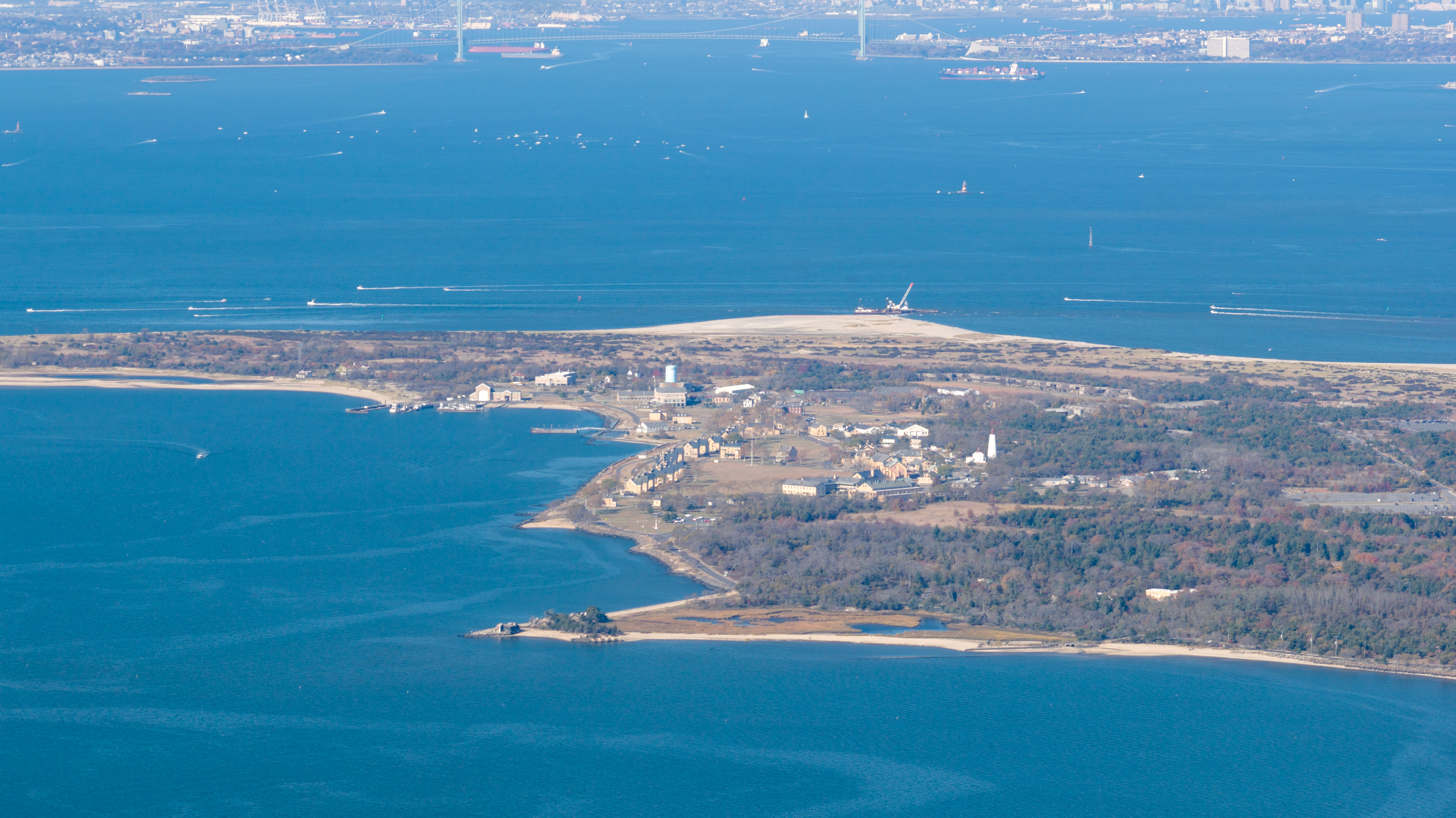
- An aerial view of the greater Fort Hancock area, November 2025

- Location within Monmouth County, New Jersey
- Location: Sandy Hook, New Jersey
- Coordinates: 40°27′50″N 74°00′10″W
- Built: 1857 (Fort at Sandy Hook); 1874 (proving ground); 1890 (Fort Hancock)
- Architect: Capt. Robert E. Lee, United States Army Corps of Engineers
- Architectural style: Third System (1857 fort), Endicott Program (Fort Hancock)
- Part of: Fort Hancock and the Sandy Hook Proving Ground Historic District (ID80002505)

Significant dates
- Designated NHLDCP: December 17, 1982
- Designated CP: April 24, 1980

Fort Hancock is a former United States Army fort at Sandy Hook in Middletown Township, New Jersey. The coastal artillery base defended the Atlantic coast and the entrance to New York Harbor, with its first gun batteries operational in 1896. The fort served from then until 1950 as part of the Harbor Defenses of New York and predecessor organizations. Between 1874 and 1919, the adjacent US Army Sandy Hook Proving Ground was operated in conjunction with Fort Hancock. It is now part of Fort Hancock Memorial Park. It was preceded by the Fort at Sandy Hook, built 1857–1867 and demolished beginning in 1885.

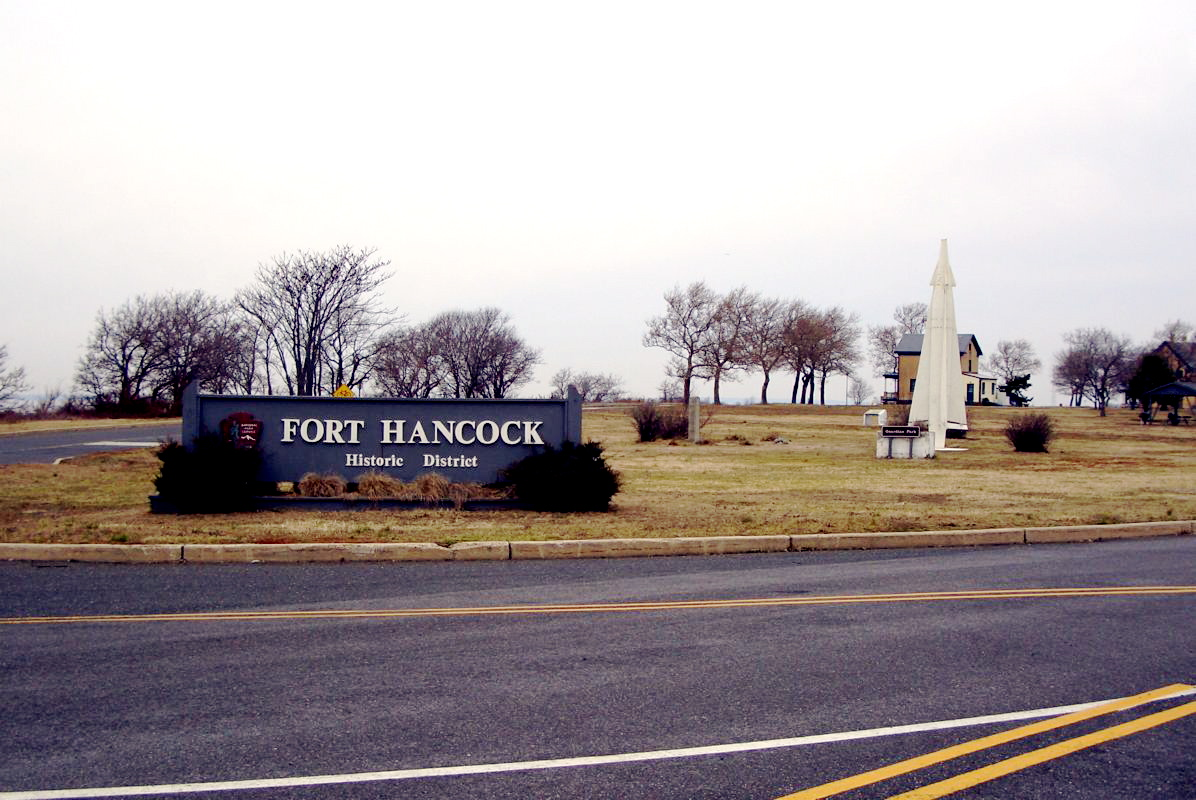
Fort Hancock Memorial Park

The Sandy Hook Light, built in 1764 and the oldest working lighthouse in the United States, is located on the grounds of Fort Hancock.

== History ==
=== Fort at Sandy Hook ===
The Sandy Hook area was first fortified as part of the third system of US fortifications. Construction on the Fort at Sandy Hook began in 1857 and ceased in 1867, with the fort serviceable though largely incomplete. This fort was never officially named, but since the area was named Fort Hancock in 1895 it is often called by that name. It was sometimes locally called Fort Lincoln or Fort Hudson. Originally two tower forts were proposed, but a much larger single fort was decided on instead. The initial design of the fort was by then-Captain Robert E. Lee of the Army Corps of Engineers. The fort was designed as a five-bastion irregular pentagon, with two tiers (one casemated, one barbette) of cannon totaling 173 guns on three seacoast fronts, with another 39 guns covering the landward approaches. As was common in Third System forts in the Northeast, it was built primarily of granite. At some point, with the casemate tier of the three seacoast fronts largely complete, the fort was redesigned to speed its overall completion, basically by eliminating the landward bastion and simplifying its neighboring bastions. Following the Civil War, it was determined that masonry forts were vulnerable to rifled guns, and funding for their construction was cut off in 1867. The fort remained incomplete until 1885, when almost all of it was cannibalized to build the Sandy Hook Proving Ground, the new Fort Hancock, and supporting structures such as a seawall. A small portion of one wall remains in place with four cannon ports.

=== Fort Hancock ===
In 1874 the Sandy Hook Proving Ground was established as a weapons testing area, primarily for coast defense weapons. This was operated by the Ordnance Department and was organizationally separate from Fort Hancock.

In 1890 construction began on the artillery batteries at Fort Hancock, which was named for Major General Winfield Scott Hancock in 1895. These resulted from the large-scale Endicott Program, which in 1885 proposed a new, comprehensive system of forts defending port cities. Fort Hancock was one of the first forts built and prototyped several weapon installations. The first batteries begun at Fort Hancock were Battery Potter and Battery Reynolds (later Reynolds-McCook), initially the "Gun Lift Battery" and the "Sandy Hook Mortar Battery", both of which were built with high walls all around for land defense, a feature not found in most subsequent US installations.

Battery Potter

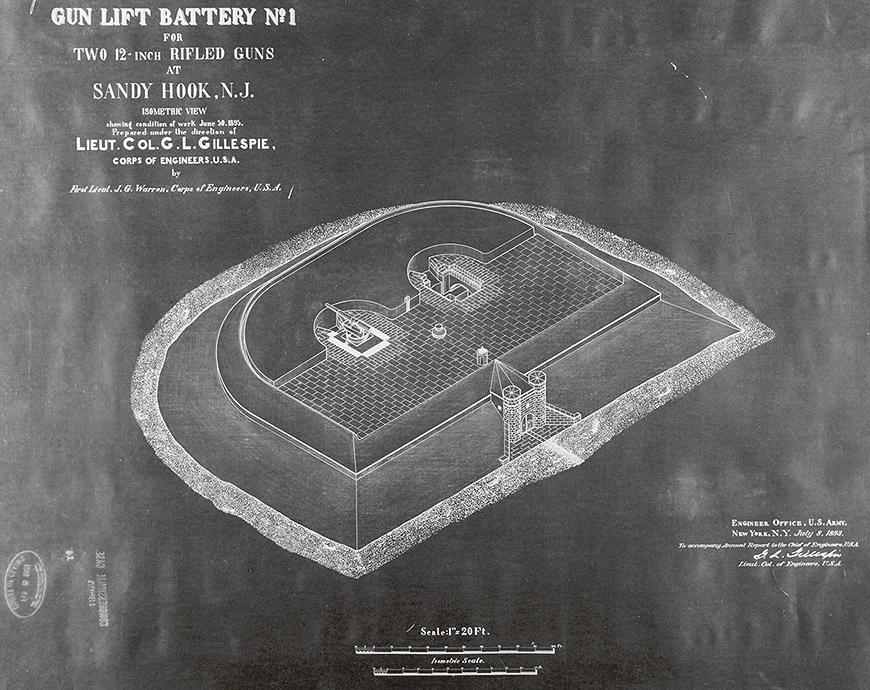
Drawing of Battery Potter

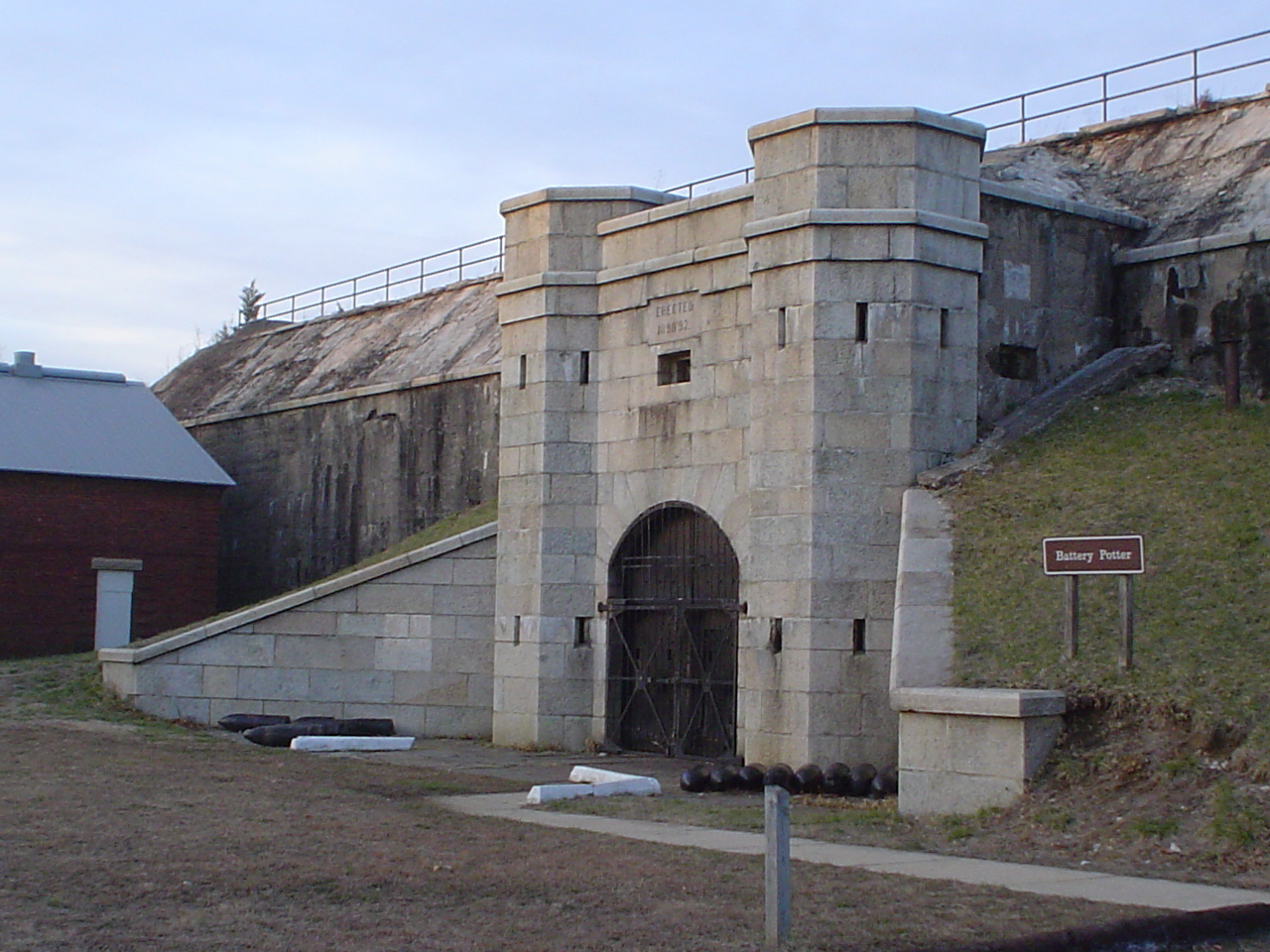
Contemporary view of entrance to Battery Potter

Battery Potter was the prototype battery for the steam-hydraulic gun lift carriage. The Endicott Program centered on disappearing guns, which would remain concealed behind a concrete-and-earth parapet until raised to fire. Most of the weapons in the program were mounted on Buffington-Crozier disappearing carriages. However, early on there was doubt that this carriage could successfully raise and lower a 12-inch (305 mm) gun. The alternative developed for this was the gun lift carriage, essentially a barbette carriage mounted on a hydraulic elevator. A steam plant powered the hydraulic system. One advantage of the gun lift carriage not found in most US disappearing gun installations was 360° all-around fire. Battery Potter (known as "Gun Lift Battery No. 1" until named in 1903) received its first gun in 1892 (a 12-inch (305 mm) gun M1888, Watervliet serial no. 11, the first operational gun of the Endicott Program) and was completed in 1894, but for some reason was not accepted for service until 1898, possibly due to extensive testing. The gun lift system proved expensive to build and operate, as the steam plant had to be running continuously to provide pressure for elevator operation. Other early 12-inch gun installations were on simple non-disappearing barbette carriages until the M1896 Buffington-Crozier carriage was developed for the 12-inch gun. Although a few installations such as Battery Torbert at Fort Delaware were begun as gun lift batteries, these were completed with disappearing guns, and Battery Potter was the only gun lift battery completed. In 1903 Battery Potter was named for Joseph H. Potter, a Civil War general. By 1907 several additional batteries were completed at Fort Hancock, and with the construction of Battery Arrowsmith under way to cover its sector, Battery Potter was disarmed. Three spare gun lift carriages were modified as barbette carriages, designated Altered Gun Lift Carriage M1897, and emplaced at Fort Flagler (2) and Fort Worden (1) in the Puget Sound area of Washington state.

Battery Reynolds

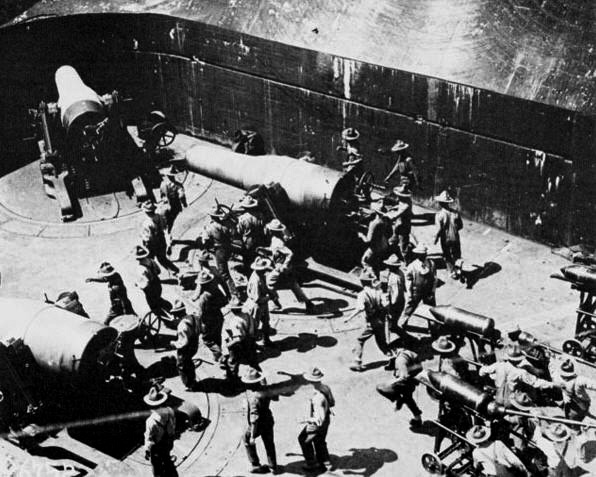
This photo shows a mortar pit of the Abbot Quad period. This illustrates the difficulty of reloading four mortars in this configuration. Three of four mortars and 30 soldiers are visible in the crowded space.

Battery Reynolds (half of which was renamed as Battery McCook in 1906) was a battery of sixteen 12-inch caliber mortars in the "Abbot Quad" arrangement. This was designed to place the mortars as closely together as possible, in the hope of scoring multiple hits on an enemy ship by firing simultaneously in a bracketing "shotgun" pattern. The battery had four pits in a square arrangement, with four mortars per pit, also in a square. The pits were separated by a traverse, which were the ammunition magazines and storages areas that ran the width and breadth of the Battery. These were built of concrete, backfilled with sand, and covered with vegetation. The entire battery was surrounded by a high concrete wall covered with earth for land defense. This arrangement was used at a number of early Endicott forts. However, simultaneously reloading the mortars in each pit proved cumbersome. Four mortars - the mortar closest to the magazine door in each pit - were removed and emplaced in the adjacent Navesink Highlands at the Highlands Military Reservation. In later battery design, the pits were first built with open backs for the four mortars, and then ultimately redesigned to be arranged in a line with open backs, and two mortars per emplacement.

Initial construction

By 1909 the following batteries were constructed:

Name	No. of guns	Gun type	Carriage type	Years active
Dynamite	2	15-inch (381 mm) dynamite gun	pedestal	1896–1902
Dynamite	1	8-inch (203 mm) dynamite gun	pedestal	1896–1902
Potter	2	12-inch (305 mm) gun M1888	gun lift M1891	1898–1907
Reynolds	8	12-inch (305 mm) mortar M1886	barbette M1891	1898–1918
McCook	8	12-inch (305 mm) mortar M1886	barbette M1891	1898–1923
Alexander	2	12-inch (305 mm) gun M1888	disappearing M1896	1899–1943
Bloomfield	2	12-inch (305 mm) gun M1888	disappearing M1896	1899–1944
Richardson	2	12-inch (305 mm) gun M1895	disappearing M1901	1904–1944
Halleck	3	10-inch (254 mm) gun M1888	disappearing M1896	1898–1944
Granger	2	10-inch (254 mm) gun M1888	disappearing M1896	1898–1942
Arrowsmith	3	8-inch (203 mm) gun M1888	disappearing M1894	1909–1920
Peck	2	6-inch (152 mm) gun M1900	pedestal M1900	1903–1946
Gunnison	2	6-inch (152 mm) gun M1903	disappearing M1903	1905–1946
Engle	1	5-inch (127 mm) gun M1897	balanced pillar M1896	1898–1917
Unnamed	1	4.72-inch (120 mm) Schneider gun	pedestal	1898-1898
Urmston	4	3-inch (76 mm) gun M1898	masking parapet M1898	1903–1920
Urmston	2	3-inch (76 mm) gun M1903	pedestal M1903	1909–1946
Morris	4	3-inch (76 mm) gun M1903	pedestal M1903	1908–1946

Facilities for planting and controlling an underwater minefield were built as well. Battery Dynamite was one of a few built for Zalinski pneumatic dynamite guns; these used a dynamite-loaded projectile with a much larger explosive charge than conventional guns of similar bore. However, they also had a much lower velocity with consequent fire control problems and were withdrawn from service by 1902. Batteries Bloomfield, Richardson, Halleck, and Alexander together formed the "Nine Gun Battery" with one of the longest continuous gun lines in the Endicott system. They were begun as the seven-gun Battery Halleck in 1896, built on top of the third system fort, and were divided in 1904 after expansion to nine guns. The unnamed one-gun battery contained a 4.72-inch (120 mm) French-made Schneider gun unique in the US artillery system; it was probably a test gun from the Proving Ground pressed into service after the outbreak of the Spanish–American War. The 3-inch (76 mm) batteries were often called "mine defense" guns, intended to defend a minefield against minesweepers.

=== Organization ===
Fort Hancock was originally part of the New York Artillery District, part of which became the Coast Defenses of Southern New York in 1913, along with Fort Hamilton and Fort Wadsworth. However, circa 1915 Fort Hancock became its own coast defense command as the Coast Defenses of Sandy Hook. In 1924 this was renamed as the Harbor Defenses of Sandy Hook. On 9 May 1942 Fort Hancock became part of the Harbor Defenses of New York and the Sandy Hook command was disestablished.

In 1901 coast artillery companies were created by redesignating the heavy artillery companies which previously garrisoned forts, and in 1907 the United States Army Coast Artillery Corps was established to operate the country's new defenses.

=== World War I ===
Following the American entry into World War I a number of changes took place at forts in the US, with a view to getting US-manned heavy and railway artillery into service on the Western Front. Fort Hancock was less affected than most forts, probably due to its being a primary defense for New York City. One 10-inch (254 mm) gun of Battery Halleck was removed for potential service as railway artillery; several other weapons including the other guns of Battery Halleck and the three 8-inch (203 mm) guns of Battery Arrowsmith were listed for removal but remained at the fort. Battery Engle's single 5-inch (127 mm) gun was removed for service as a field gun on a wheeled carriage and not returned to the fort, as were almost all of the 5-inch (127 mm) M1897 guns forcewide. Also, four mortars (one from each pit) of Battery Reynolds-McCook were removed in 1917 to be remounted at the Highlands Military Reservation to the south of Sandy Hook. In 1917 construction began on two 12-inch (305 mm) batteries at Fort Hancock with two guns each on long-range barbette carriages; these were completed in 1921 and named Battery Kingman and Battery Mills.

=== Interwar period ===
Following World War I a number of additional changes took place in the Coast Artillery, and Fort Hancock was no exception. The proving ground functions were relocated to Aberdeen Proving Ground in Maryland. The three 8-inch (203 mm) guns of Battery Arrowsmith were removed. Unusually, Battery Reynolds-McCook was stripped of all its mortars, and the mortars at Highlands were also removed. The 3-inch (76 mm) M1898 guns of Battery Urmston were removed in 1920 as one of several weapon types withdrawn from service at this time. The new long-range 12-inch (305 mm) batteries and a 16-inch (406 mm) gun battery at Fort Tilden had become the primary gun defenses for Greater New York; however, the older guns remained in place until World War II. The new 12-inch batteries originally had open emplacements; these were casemated against air attack in 1942–43. Fort Hancock was generally in caretaker status from 1919 until the 1930s. In 1931 Batteries C and E of the 2nd Battalion, 52nd Coast Artillery (Railway) Regiment, totaling two 12-inch railway mortars and two 8-inch railway guns, were stationed at the fort. Subsequently, the fort was used as a practice range for other railway artillery units.

The fort was also used as a Citizens' Military Training Camp.

=== World War II ===
In 1940–41 Fort Hancock served as a mobilization center, with first a tent city and subsequently numerous temporary buildings accommodating trainees. With Batteries Kingman and Mills and 16-inch (406 mm) batteries at Fort Tilden and the Highlands Military Reservation providing adequate gun defenses for Greater New York, Fort Hamilton's other 6-inch (152 mm) through 12-inch (305 mm) weapons were gradually scrapped in 1942–43. In 1943 a harbor entrance control post was built on the long-defunct Battery Potter, and Battery Gunnison was rebuilt to accommodate the 6-inch pedestal-mounted guns of Battery Peck as an examination battery. This battery also became known as Battery New Peck. Two Anti-Motor Torpedo Boat (AMTB) batteries were established at the fort, each with an authorized strength of four 90 mm (3.54 in) guns, two on fixed mounts and two on towed mounts. AMTB 7 was at a location that is unclear from references, while AMTB 8 was at the "old" Battery Peck.

=== Cold War ===
In 1946 it was determined that gun defenses were obsolete, and Fort Hancock's guns were scrapped. The fort was deactivated with the demise of the Coast Artillery Corps in 1950, but a year later was re-activated as a base for 90 mm (3.54 in) and 120 mm (4.72 in) antiaircraft guns, the first stateside Cold War defenses. The fort was deactivated again in 1953, but reactivated in 1956 as a Nike missile base (site NY-56). This lasted through 1974, when the stateside Nike missile system was deactivated.

=== Post-Cold War ===
Hurricane Sandy damaged Buildings 119 and 120, built during World War II, and in 2018 the NPS decided to raze the buildings, with demolition beginning in 2020.

== Present ==
Fort Hancock was decommissioned as an active U.S. Army installation in 1974. It is now part of the National Parks of New York Harbor under the National Park System. A museum is managed as part of the Sandy Hook Unit of Gateway National Recreation Area. In 2013, the Park Service introduced Nubian goats to the fort in order to clear away poison ivy that has been growing unchecked on the six-acre property for about 40 years.

The 21st Century Federal Advisory Committee was formed in September, 2012, intended for citizens to advise the National Park Service on potential redevelopment of the Fort's unused buildings. Since then, various rehabilitation and adaptive re-use proposals have been solicited for lease of the various buildings from the National Park Service. As of 2018, a few of the structures are under lease or letters of intent. The NPS is also seeking repairs to structures heavily damaged by Hurricane Sandy in 2012.

A 20-inch (508 mm) Rodman gun (the biggest gun produced in the Civil War era), a 10-inch (254 mm) Rodman gun, several Nike missiles, and two rare 6-inch (152 mm) M1900 guns at Battery New Peck a.k.a. Battery Gunnison are displayed at the fort. Battery Gunnison was the only gun battery at Fort Hancock that wasn't salvaged for scrap after World War 2, and still retains these two guns on barbette carriages, made in 1903. The Battery has been undergoing an in-depth restoration since 2003 by the Army Ground Forces Association, a non-profit group of living historians who have brought the Battery back to how it looked in 1943, and who offer living history programs throughout the year. The Army Ground Forces Association is also an official Park Partner with the National Park Service.

Fort Hancock has one of the largest collections of preserved Endicott batteries anywhere, including various experimental batteries at the former proving ground. Significant remains include the dynamite gun battery and the test battery for the 14-inch (356 mm) gun turrets of Fort Drum in Manila Bay, Philippines. Many of the garrison buildings survive. However, only a small part of one wall of the third system fort, with four embrasures, remains.

Nike Site NY-56 remains one of the few Nike batteries left in the nation where both the launch and radar sections survive intact. The Launch Area was heavily damaged in Hurricane Sandy, but the radar site, located at Horseshoe Cove, is under restoration by US Army Air Defense Artillery veterans of the Cold War era, several of whom were stationed at Fort Hancock in the 1960s-70s.

== Gallery ==
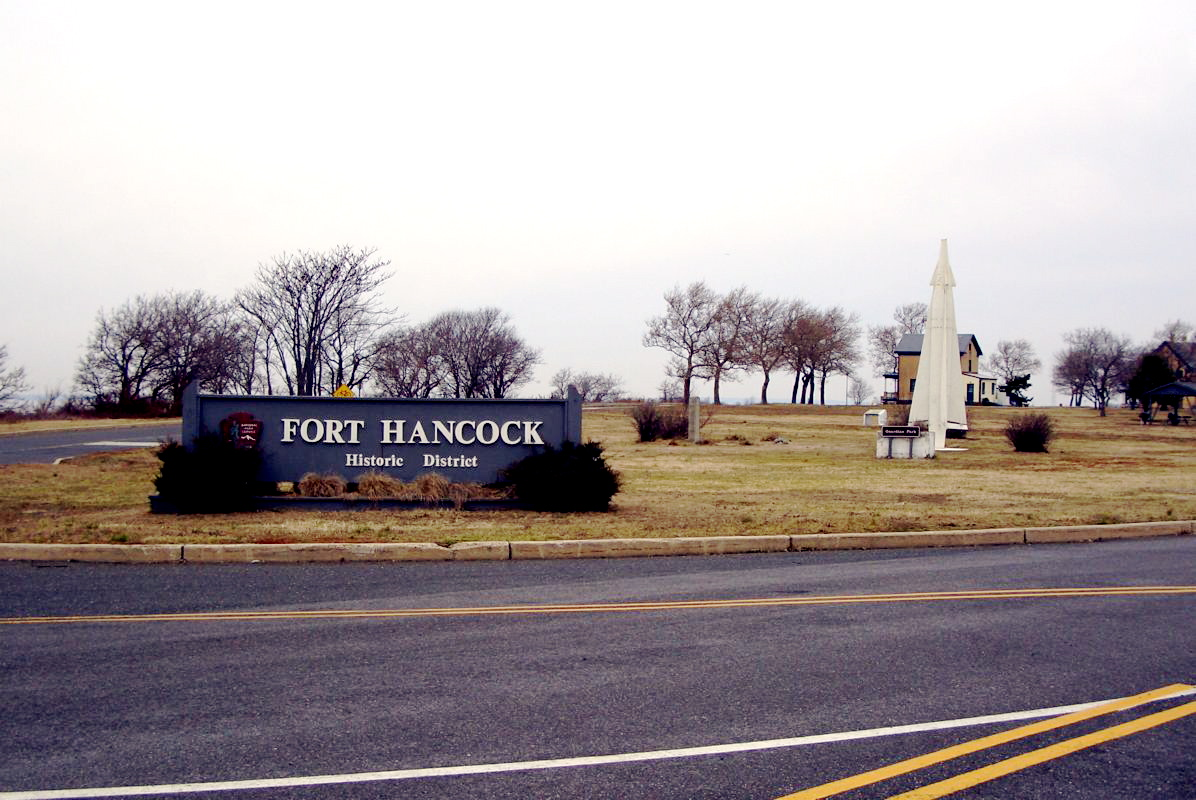
Fort Hancock Historic Post, showing Guardian Park, with Nike-Hercules missile

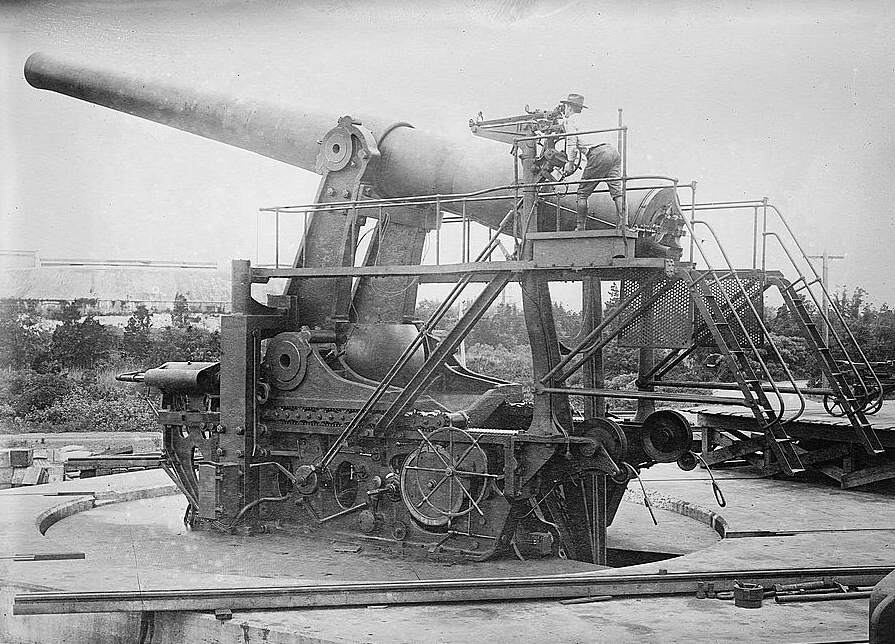
A 14" disappearing gun at the proving ground

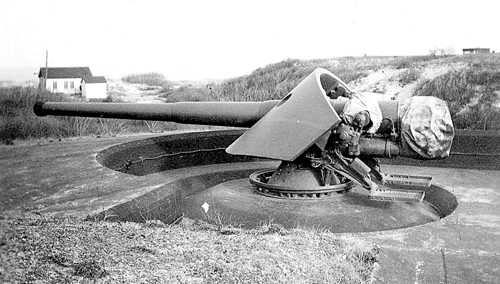
6-inch gun on M1900 pedestal mount, seen at Emplacement Number 1 of Battery Fremont Peck. This exact gun, and an identical gun also mounted at Battery Peck, were moved to Battery John Gunnison in 1943, where the Battery became "Battery New Peck." They remain there to this day, and Battery Gunnison / New Peck is undergoing a full restoration to how it looked in 1943 at the height of World War 2.

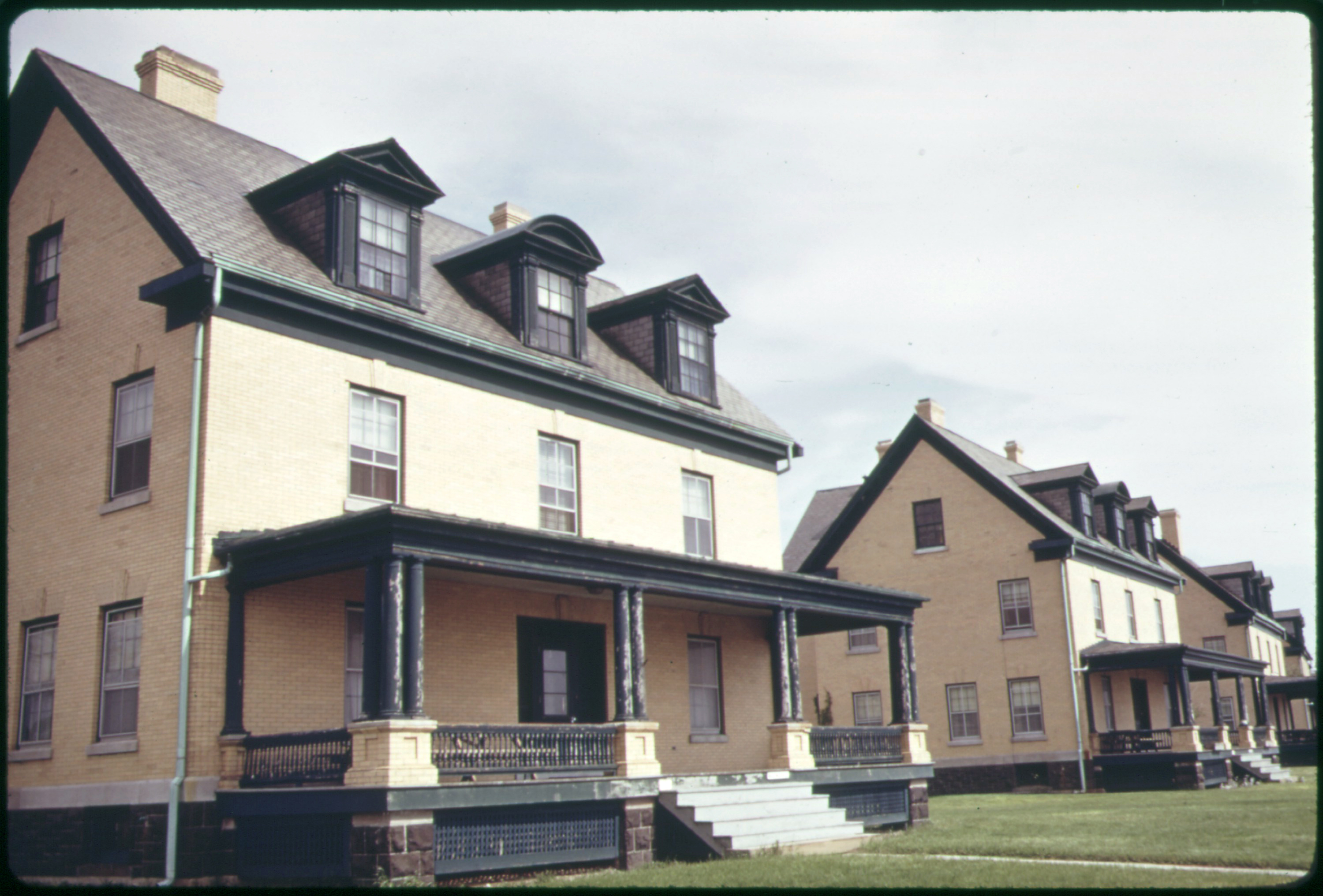
Officers' Row, 1973. Photo by Arthur Tress

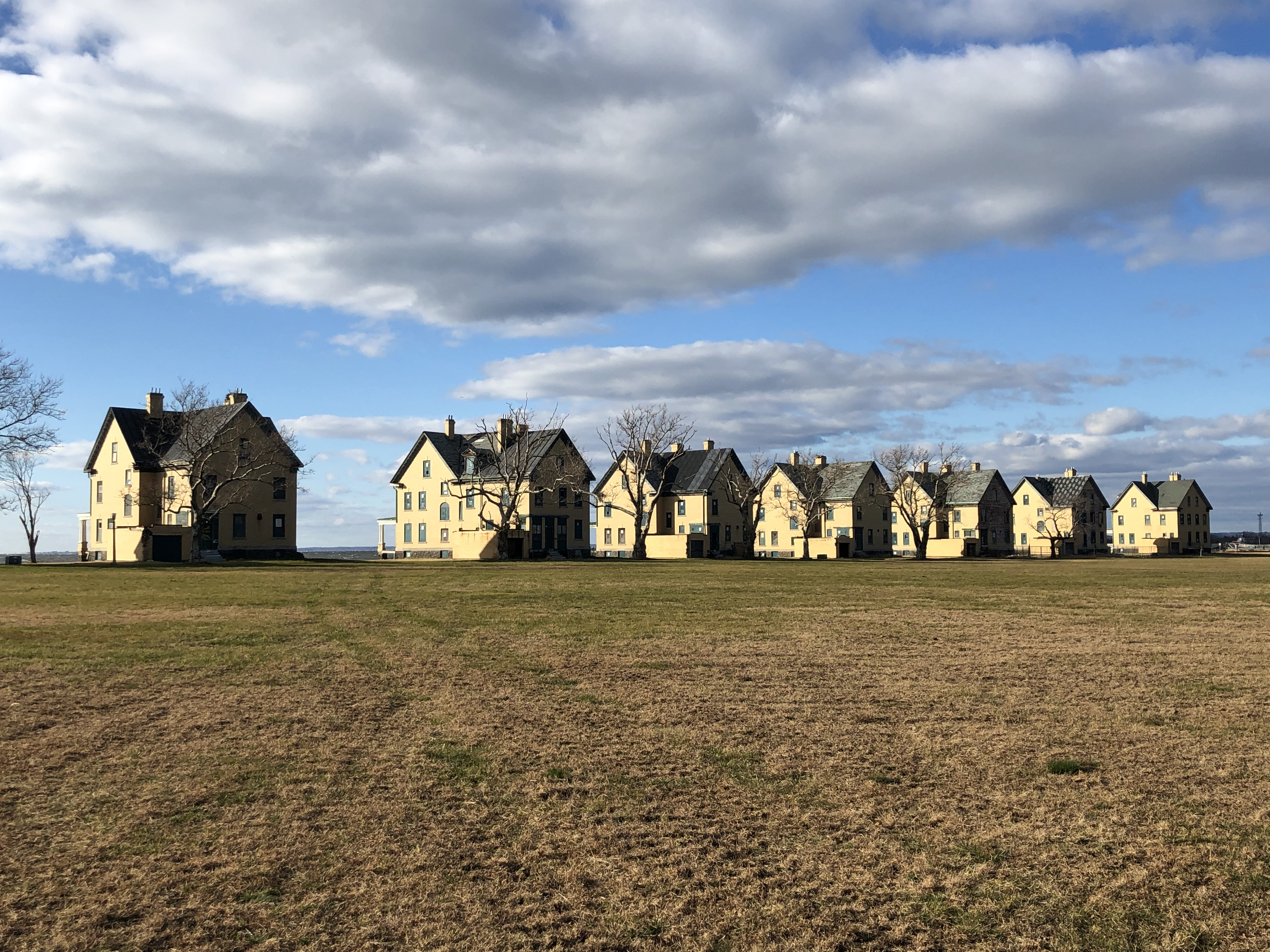
Officers Houses, seen in 2021

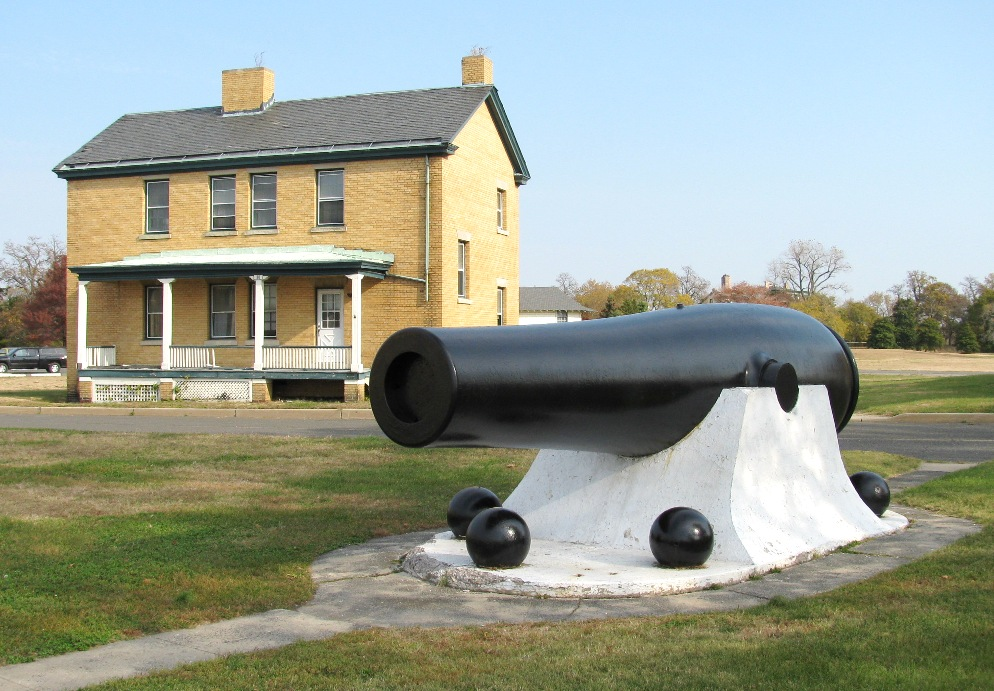
20-inch Rodman gun with shells

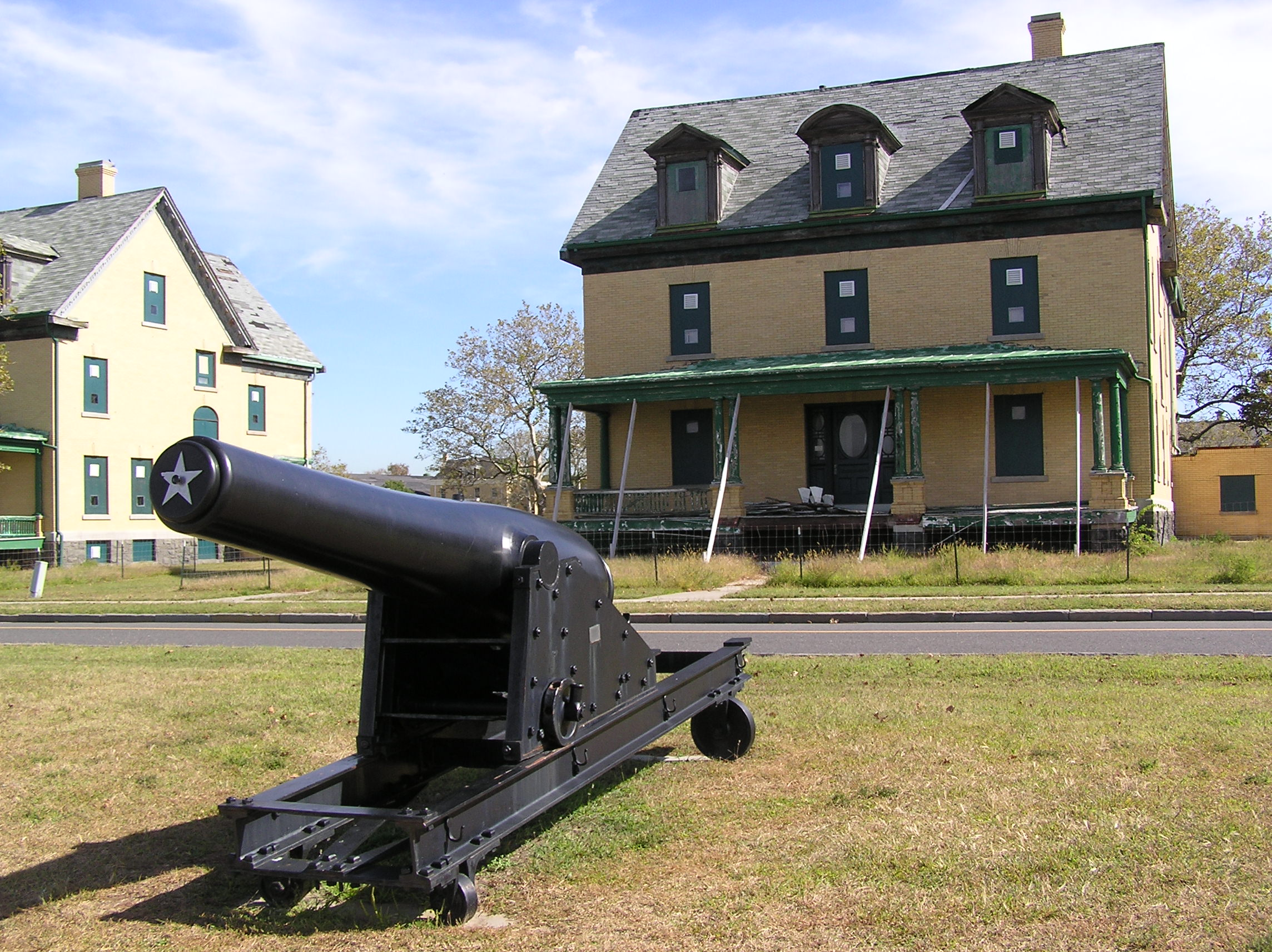
10-inch Rodman gun in front of officers' quarters

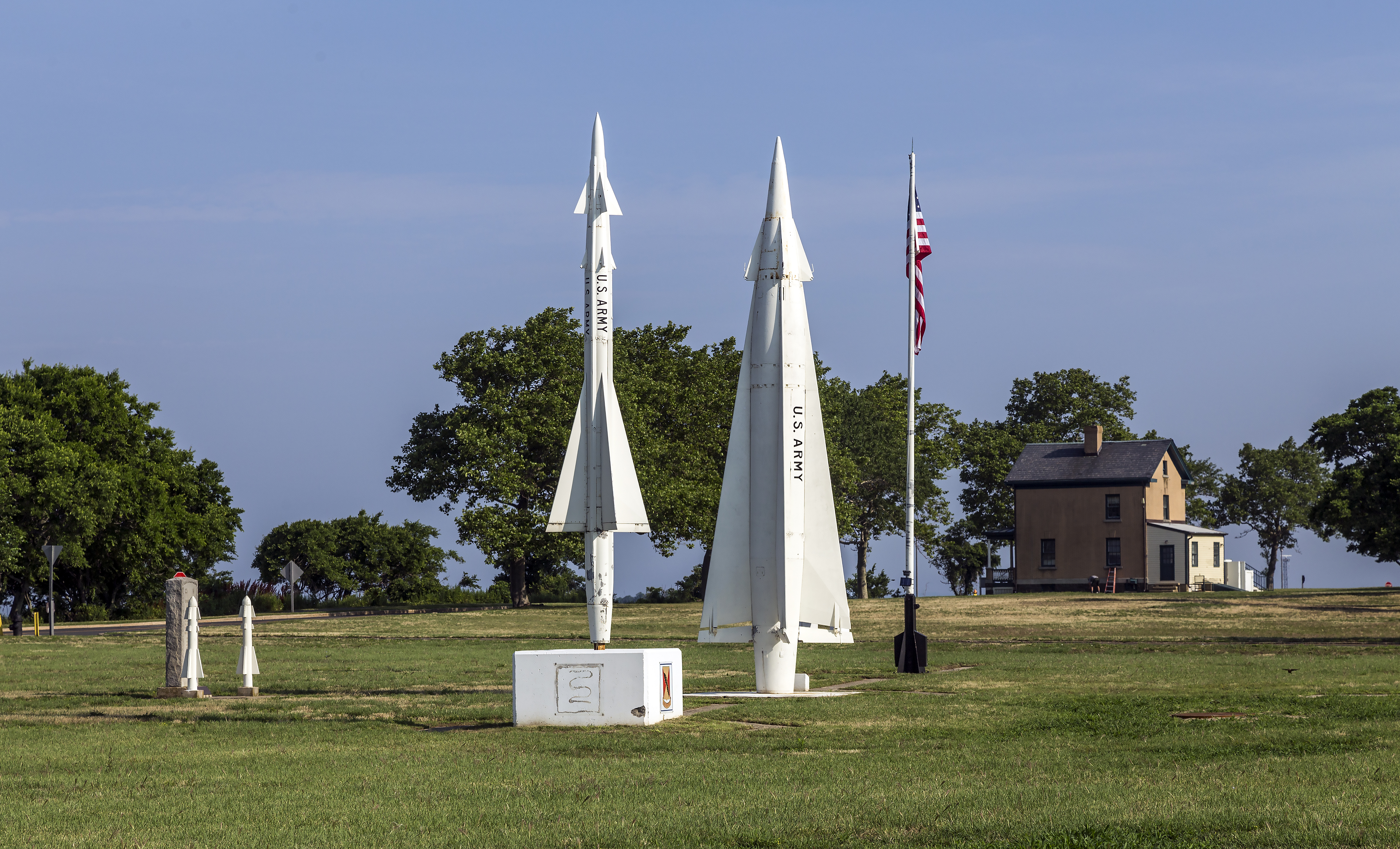
Nike-Ajax and Nike-Hercules missiles

== See also ==
- Sandy Hook Light
- Raritan Bayshore
- Seacoast defense in the United States
- United States Army Coast Artillery Corps
- Battery Gunnison

== Bibliography ==
- Berhow, Mark A., ed. (2004). American Seacoast Defenses, A Reference Guide (Second ed.). CDSG Press. ISBN 0-9748167-0-1.
- Gaines, William C., Coast Artillery Organizational History, 1917-1950, Coast Defense Journal, vol. 23, issue 2, pp. 6-8, 25-27
- Lewis, Emanuel Raymond (1979). Seacoast Fortifications of the United States. Annapolis: Leeward Publications. ISBN 978-0-929521-11-4.
- Rinaldi, Richard A. (2004). The U. S. Army in World War I: Orders of Battle. General Data LLC. ISBN 0-9720296-4-8.
- Roberts, Robert B. (1988). Encyclopedia of Historic Forts: The Military, Pioneer, and Trading Posts of the United States. New York: Macmillan. ISBN 0-02-926880-X.
- Stanton, Shelby L. (1991). World War II Order of Battle. Galahad Books. ISBN 0-88365-775-9.
- Weaver II, John R. (2018). A Legacy in Brick and Stone: American Coastal Defense Forts of the Third System, 1816-1867, 2nd Ed. McLean, VA: Redoubt Press. ISBN 978-1-7323916-1-1.
