= Sandy Hook =

Peninsula in New Jersey

- Spit
- Sandy Hook in November 2025

- Location within Monmouth County, New Jersey
- Coordinates: 40.4530°N 73.9950°W
- Location: Middletown Township, Monmouth County, New Jersey, United States
- Water bodies: Atlantic Ocean (to the east); Shrewsbury River (to the west)
- Age: Last Glacial Maximum ("LGM"; ≈25,000 years old)
- Formed by: Wisconsin glaciation period
- Operator: National Park Service

Area
  - Total: 2,044 acres (827 ha)

Dimensions
  - Length: 6 miles (9.7 km)
  - Width: 0.1 to 1.0 mile (0.16 to 1.61 km)
  - Depth: 250 to 300 feet (76 to 91 m)
- Elevation: 2.1 m (7 ft)
- Designation: Barrier spit

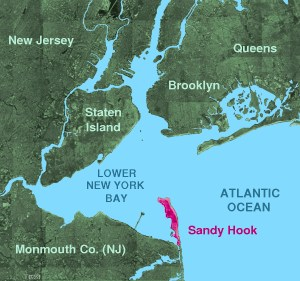
Sandy Hook, part of the Gateway National Recreation Area

Sandy Hook is a barrier spit in Middletown Township, Monmouth County, New Jersey, United States. The barrier spit, approximately 6 miles (9.7 km) in length and varying from 0.1 to 1.0 mile (0.16 to 1.61 km) wide, is located at the north end of the Jersey Shore. It encloses the southern entrance of Lower New York Bay south of New York City, protecting it from the open waters of the Atlantic Ocean to the east.

The Dutch called the area "Sant Hoek", with the English "Hook" deriving from the Dutch "Hoek" (corner, angle), meaning "spit of land". For over three centuries mariners tasked with guiding ships across the Sandy Hook bar have been known as Sandy Hook pilots.

Most of Sandy Hook is owned and managed by the National Park Service as the Sandy Hook Unit of Gateway National Recreation Area.

== Description ==
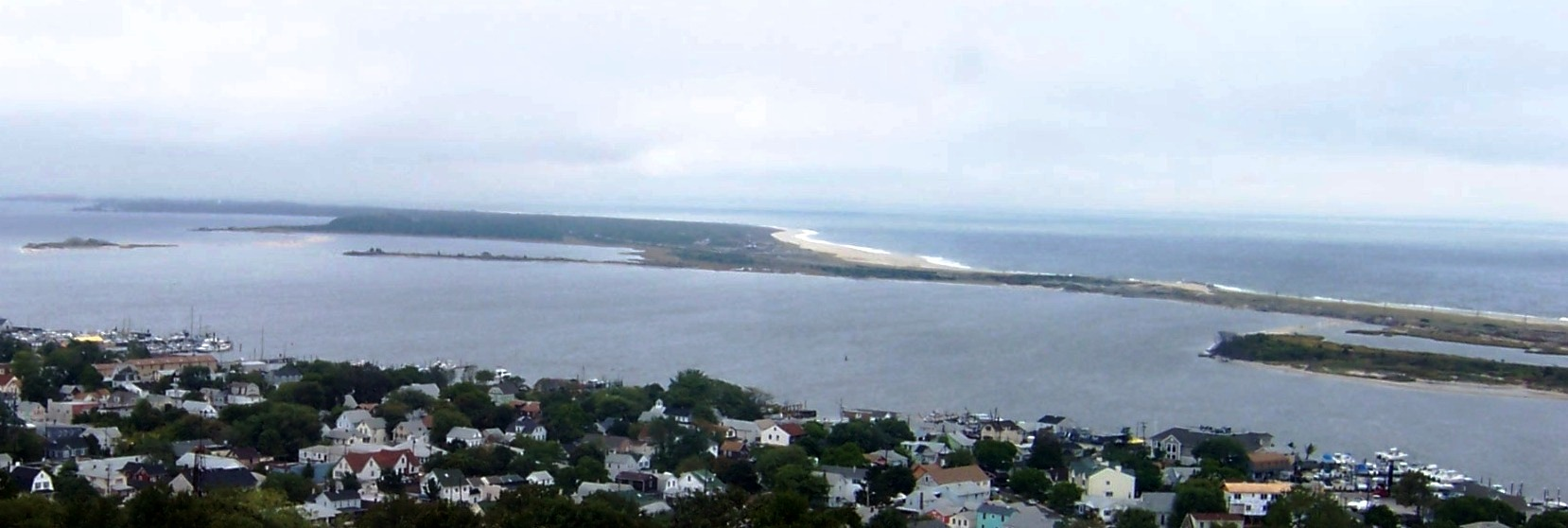
Sandy Hook as seen from the top of Navesink Twin Lights, Highlands, New Jersey

Geologically, Sandy Hook is a large sand spit or barrier spit, the extension of a barrier peninsula along the coast of New Jersey, separated from the mainland by the estuary of the Shrewsbury River. On its western side, the peninsula encloses Sandy Hook Bay, a triangular arm of Raritan Bay. The 2,044-acre (8.27 km^{2}) peninsula was discovered by Henry Hudson, and, historically, Sandy Hook has been a convenient anchorage for ships before proceeding into Upper New York Harbor.

Sandy Hook is part of Middletown Township, although not contiguous with the rest of the Township. Because the peninsula is also federal enclave, Middletown and the federal government have a Concurrent jurisdiction. The community of Highlands overlooks the southern part of the hook.

Sandy Hook is owned by the federal government. Most of it is managed by the National Park Service and U.S. National Park Service rangers as the Sandy Hook Unit of Gateway National Recreation Area. The eastern shoreline consists of public beaches: North Beach, Gunnison Beach, and South Beach. The southern part of the spit consists of public beaches and fishing areas. The peninsula's ocean-facing beaches are considered among the finest in New Jersey and are a popular destination for recreation in summer when seasonal ferries bring beachgoers from its various docking points including NYC. Gunnison Beach is one of the largest clothing optional beaches on the East Coast.

Sandy Hook Lighthouse is located within the fort grounds, as is the Marine Academy of Science and Technology (MAST), a magnet high school, part of the Monmouth County Vocational School District. At the entrance to Fort Hancock is Guardian Park, a plaza dominated by two Nike missiles. Some of the buildings of Fort Hancock are closed to the public because their structural integrity in decay, and to preserve its profile for future visitors. A proposal was recently accepted to allow adaptive reuse of some of the buildings in Fort Hancock for private use. This partnership will hopefully help these historic structures to be maintained more effectively.

== Military history ==
The defunct U.S. Army post Fort Hancock at the north end of the peninsula is open to visitation by the National Park Service. The Sandy Hook Proving Ground was used for many years—beginning after the Civil War until 1919, when the facility was moved to Aberdeen, Maryland—and was later the site of a Nike missile defense installation. The Sandy Hook Nike station is one of a very few stations that are still intact. Almost all of the fort's gun batteries are closed to the public due to their hazardous condition. The exceptions to this are Battery Potter and Battery Gunnison. Battery Potter is open frequently for tours on the weekends, as well as Battery Gunnison which is being restored by volunteers and has two six-inch (152 mm) M1900 guns installed; the weapons were placed there in 1976. Guided tours show visitors a Nike missile, the missile firing platforms, and a radar station with 1960s-era computers. A Civil War-era 20-inch Rodman gun is also in the park; this was an experimental gun that was the largest type produced by either side of that war.

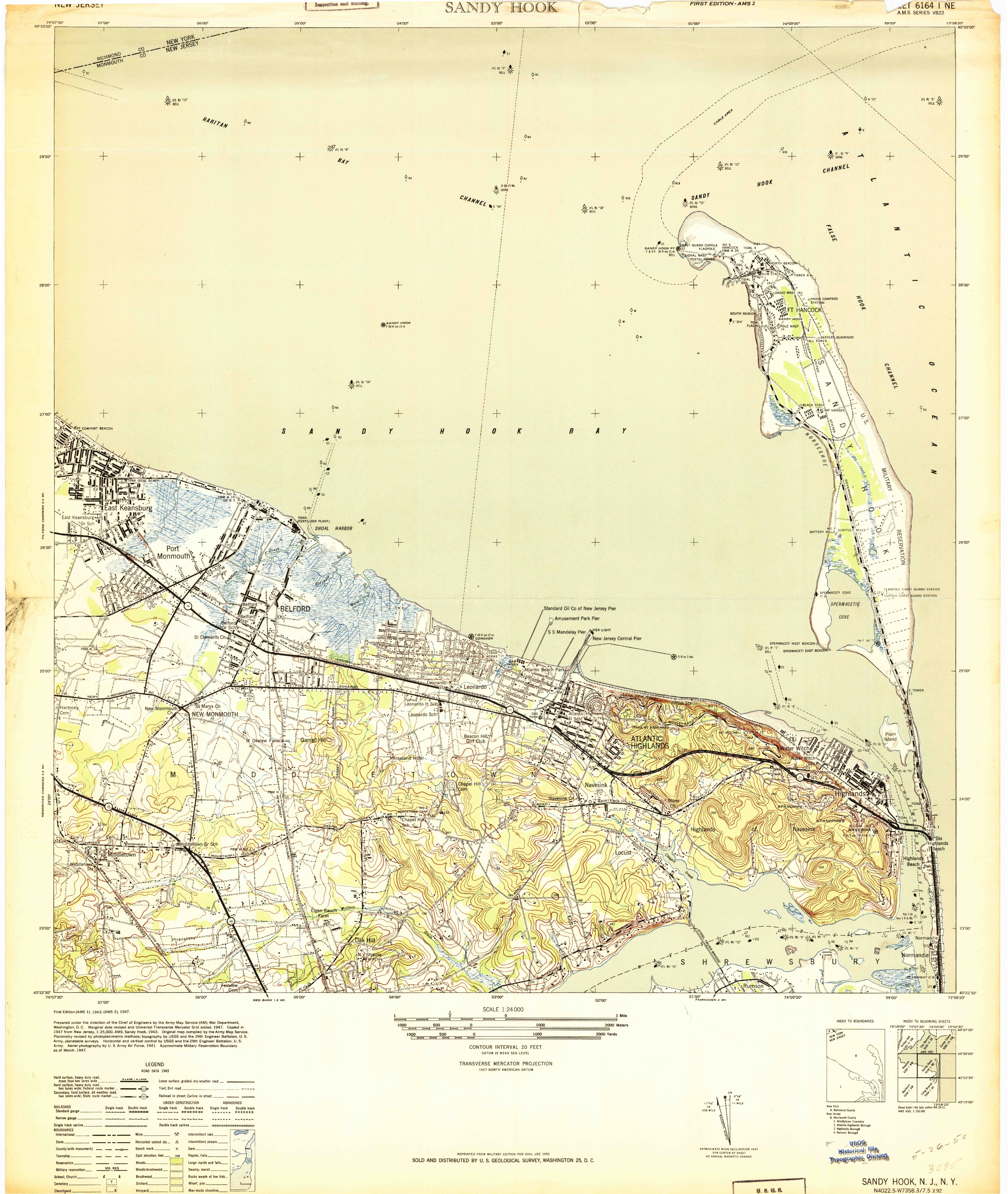
U.S. Geological Survey map of Sandy Hook in 1947

North of Fort Hancock on the western part of the "hook" is an active station of the United States Coast Guard. This is one of the original Life Saving Stations built in 1848 at a site "on bay side, one-half mile south of point of Hook." The site was changed several times through the years due to a change in land or at the request of the War Department, which owned the land. This area is administered by the Department of Homeland Security and is closed to the general public.

== Tourism and recreation ==
The beaches along the Atlantic shore of Sandy Hook—North Beach, Gunnison Beach and the Southern Beaches, A, B, C, D, E—feature parking lots, lifeguards, rest rooms and seasonal concession stands. They do not permit pets on the beaches yearly after March 15. Nude or partially nude sunbathers may be encountered at Gunnison Beach as it is clothing optional. In contrast, the western shore includes vast acres of sand and trails and a paved path without lifeguards or rest rooms. These stretches are favored by cyclists and kite surfers, and leashed dogs are permitted.

Within Sandy Hook some laws and regulations are different. Sandy Hook falls under Title 36 of the Code of Federal Regulations, as well as New Jersey State Code in instances where federal laws do not pertain. In Sandy Hook a misdemeanor could be a federal crime while outside the park it would be a minor infraction.

Accommodations near Sandy Hook include bed and breakfasts such as the Sandy Hook Cottage and Seascape Manor, as well as Grand Lady by the Sea, and Nauvoo at Sandy Hook, which are all located in Highlands. Dining options have changed drastically since Superstorm Sandy, which destroyed the island's only eating location, the Sea Gulls' Nest Deck Restaurant. On the peninsula, various food trucks can be found and nearby is the locally known Bahr's Landing, Moby's and Something Fishy. The Mule Barn Tavern, located near the lighthouse, was opened in 2023.

Local activities include the Sandy Hook All Woman Lifeguard Tournament in July, boat rentals for fishing, parties and tours, and paved path for biking, rollerblading, and walking. The Henry Hudson Trail, accessible from Highlands, New Jersey, stretches nine miles (14 km) from Aberdeen to Atlantic Highlands and is wheelchair accessible.

The northern tip of Sandy Hook is the traditional finish of the 16.1 mile Ederle-Burke Swim, which runs from the Battery at the tip of Manhattan Island through the Narrows and into Lower New York Bay. The first successful swim occurred in 1913, when New York lifeguard Alfred Brown came ashore in 13 hours, 38 minutes. As a prelude to her English Channel triumph, Gertrude Ederle swam the same course in 1925, finishing in 7 hours, 11 minutes.

== Transportation ==
The road that connects to Sandy Hook is Route 36. The road to the peninsula branches from Route 36 at the northern end of Sea Bright becoming Hartshorne Drive within the park. The Highlands-Sea Bright Bridge crosses the Shrewsbury River and carries the road traffic of Route 36 from Highlands in the west to Sea Bright in the east, near the entrance to Sandy Hook.

A bicycle path parallels the motor road. The SeaStreak ferry serves Sandy Hook from Manhattan in summertime.

== Climate ==
According to the Köppen climate classification system, Sandy Hook has a humid subtropical climate (Cfa). Cfa climates are characterized by all months having an average temperature > 32.0 °F (0.0 °C), at least four months with an average temperature ≥ 50.0 °F (10.0 °C), at least one month with an average temperature ≥ 71.6 °F (22.0 °C) and no significant precipitation difference between seasons. Although most summer days feature slight-to-moderate humidity and a cooling afternoon sea breeze in Sandy Hook, episodes of heat and high humidity can occur with heat index values > 105 °F (41 °C). Since 1981, the highest air temperature was 99.7 °F (37.6 °C) on August 9, 2001, and the highest daily average mean dew point was 78.0 °F (25.6 °C) on July 19, 2019. The average wettest month is July which correlates with the peak in thunderstorm activity.

Since 1981, the wettest calendar day was 5.61 inches (142 mm) on August 27, 2011. During the winter months, the average annual extreme minimum air temperature is 6.3 °F (−14.3 °C). Since 1981, the coldest air temperature was −3.0 °F (−19.4 °C) on January 21, 1985. Episodes of extreme cold and wind can occur with wind chill values < −3 °F (−19 °C). The average seasonal (Nov-Apr) snowfall total is between 18 and 24 inches (46 and 61 cm), and the average snowiest month is February which corresponds with the annual peak in nor'easter activity.

Climate data for Sandy Hook, 1981–2010 normals, extremes 1981–2019
Month	Jan	Feb	Mar	Apr	May	Jun	Jul	Aug	Sep	Oct	Nov	Dec	Year
Record high °F (°C)	70.2 (21.2)	77.6 (25.3)	82.1 (27.8)	90.1 (32.3)	94.3 (34.6)	95.3 (35.2)	99.4 (37.4)	99.7 (37.6)	96.2 (35.7)	92.1 (33.4)	77.5 (25.3)	74.6 (23.7)	99.7 (37.6)
Mean daily maximum °F (°C)	39.1 (3.9)	41.9 (5.5)	48.7 (9.3)	58.3 (14.6)	68.0 (20.0)	77.7 (25.4)	82.8 (28.2)	81.7 (27.6)	75.4 (24.1)	64.4 (18.0)	54.5 (12.5)	44.5 (6.9)	61.5 (16.4)
Daily mean °F (°C)	32.7 (0.4)	34.9 (1.6)	41.2 (5.1)	50.6 (10.3)	60.4 (15.8)	70.1 (21.2)	75.5 (24.2)	74.7 (23.7)	68.3 (20.2)	57.1 (13.9)	47.8 (8.8)	38.4 (3.6)	54.4 (12.4)
Mean daily minimum °F (°C)	26.3 (−3.2)	28.0 (−2.2)	33.7 (0.9)	43.0 (6.1)	52.8 (11.6)	62.5 (16.9)	68.3 (20.2)	67.7 (19.8)	61.1 (16.2)	49.7 (9.8)	41.2 (5.1)	32.2 (0.1)	47.3 (8.5)
Record low °F (°C)	−3.0 (−19.4)	2.3 (−16.5)	10.0 (−12.2)	19.1 (−7.2)	40.2 (4.6)	48.2 (9.0)	54.0 (12.2)	49.4 (9.7)	42.9 (6.1)	33.4 (0.8)	17.1 (−8.3)	1.6 (−16.9)	−3.0 (−19.4)
Average precipitation inches (mm)	3.27 (83)	2.55 (65)	3.63 (92)	4.01 (102)	3.67 (93)	3.96 (101)	4.57 (116)	3.92 (100)	3.54 (90)	3.69 (94)	3.32 (84)	3.77 (96)	43.90 (1,115)
Average relative humidity (%)	66.3	62.5	61.6	62.8	66.8	70.1	70.4	70.8	71.9	68.7	67.3	65.9	67.1
Average dew point °F (°C)	22.7 (−5.2)	23.4 (−4.8)	29.0 (−1.7)	38.4 (3.6)	49.3 (9.6)	59.9 (15.5)	65.2 (18.4)	64.6 (18.1)	58.9 (14.9)	46.9 (8.3)	37.5 (3.1)	28.0 (−2.2)	43.7 (6.5)
Source: PRISM

Climate data for Sandy Hook Buoy, NJ (Ocean Water Temperature)
Month	Jan	Feb	Mar	Apr	May	Jun	Jul	Aug	Sep	Oct	Nov	Dec	Year
Daily mean °F (°C)	37 (3)	36 (2)	40 (4)	46 (8)	55 (13)	62 (17)	69 (21)	72 (22)	68 (20)	59 (15)	51 (11)	43 (6)	53 (12)
Source: NOAA

== Ecology ==
According to the A. W. Kuchler U.S. potential natural vegetation types, Sandy Hook would have a dominant vegetation type of Northern Cordgrass (73) with a dominant vegetation form of Coastal Prairie (20). The plant hardiness zone is 7b with an average annual extreme minimum air temperature of 6.3 °F (−14.3 °C). The average date of first spring leaf-out is March 23 and fall color typically peaks in early November. The local forest can be considered as belonging to both the Northeastern coastal forests and Atlantic coastal pine barrens. Deer live in the area, as well as many seabirds such as the Least tern nesting bird. Gulls such as the American herring gull and the Laughing gull are native to the area, among others.

== Gallery ==
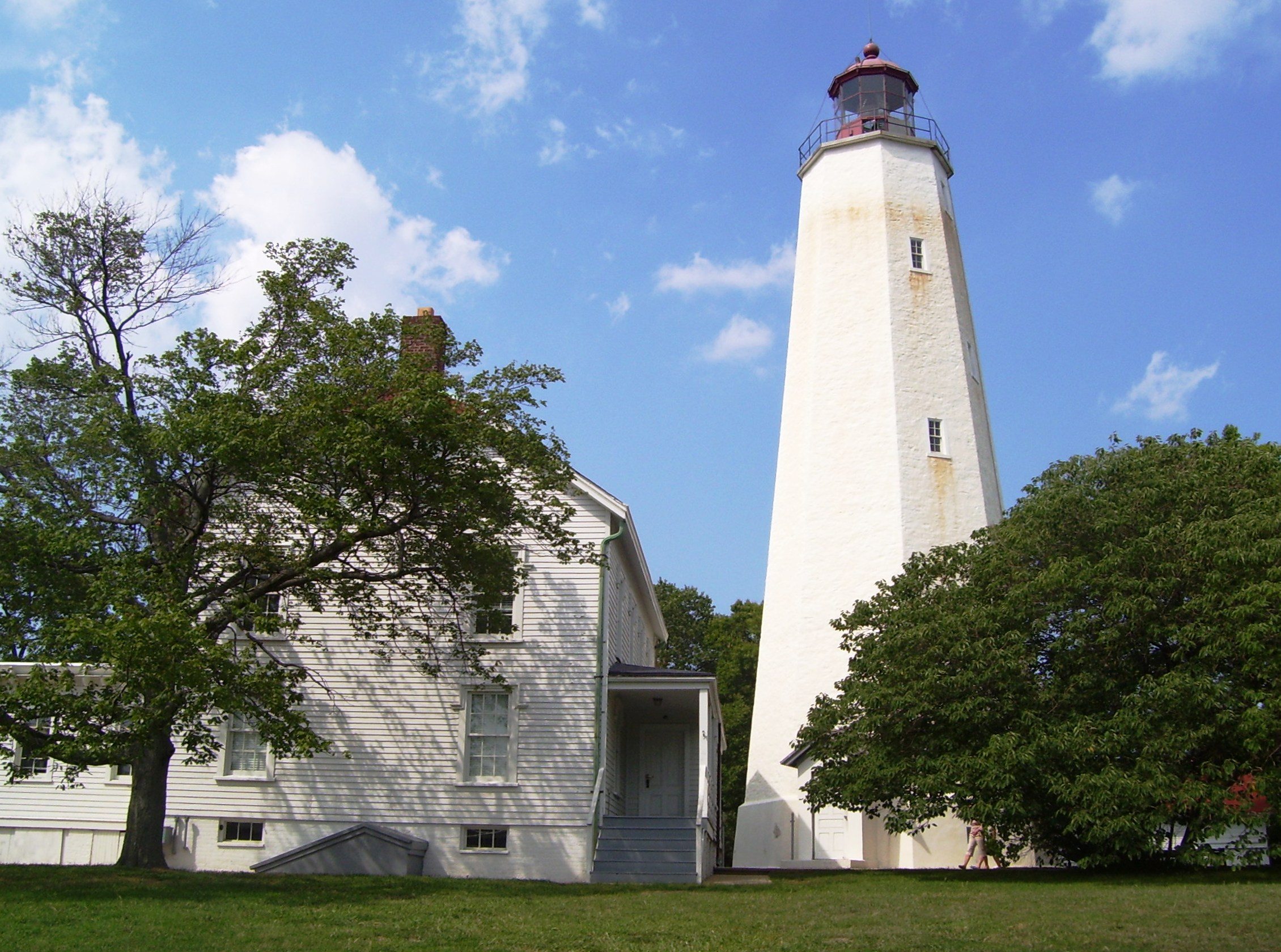
Sandy Hook Light

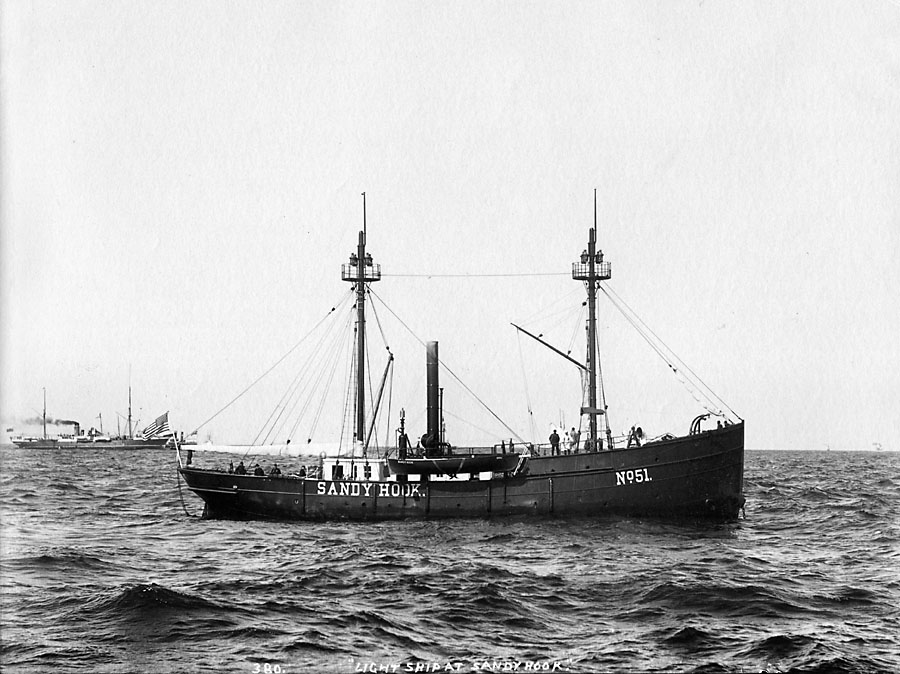
Lightship #51 at Sandy Hook as it appeared in the 1890s.

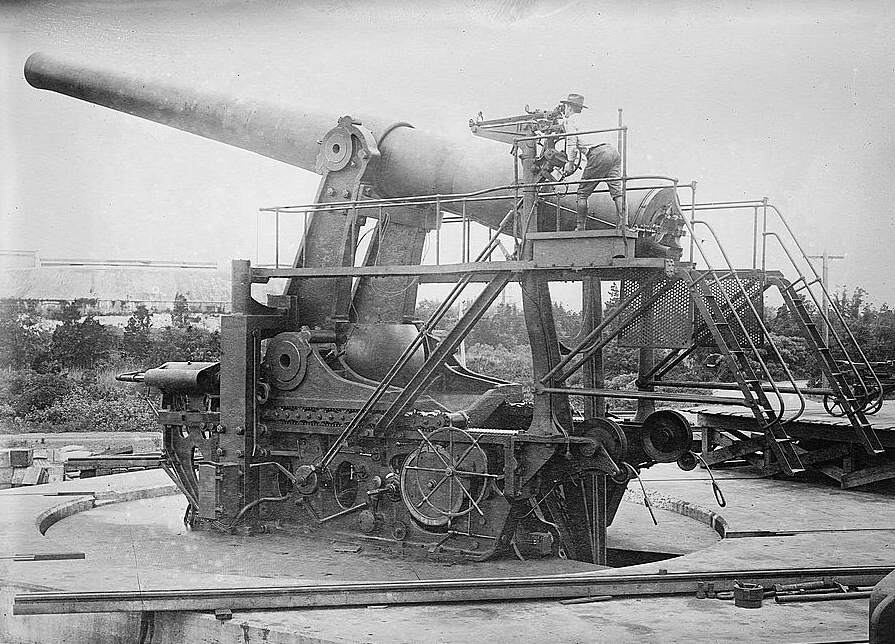
Aiming a 14-inch gun at the Sandy Hook Proving Ground

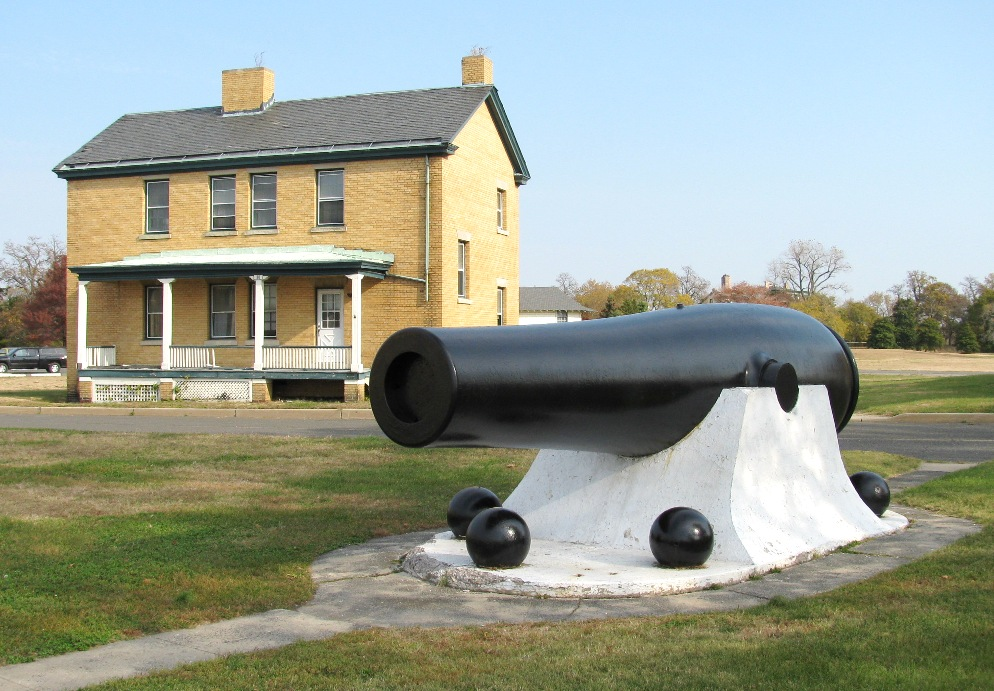
20-inch Rodman gun with shells

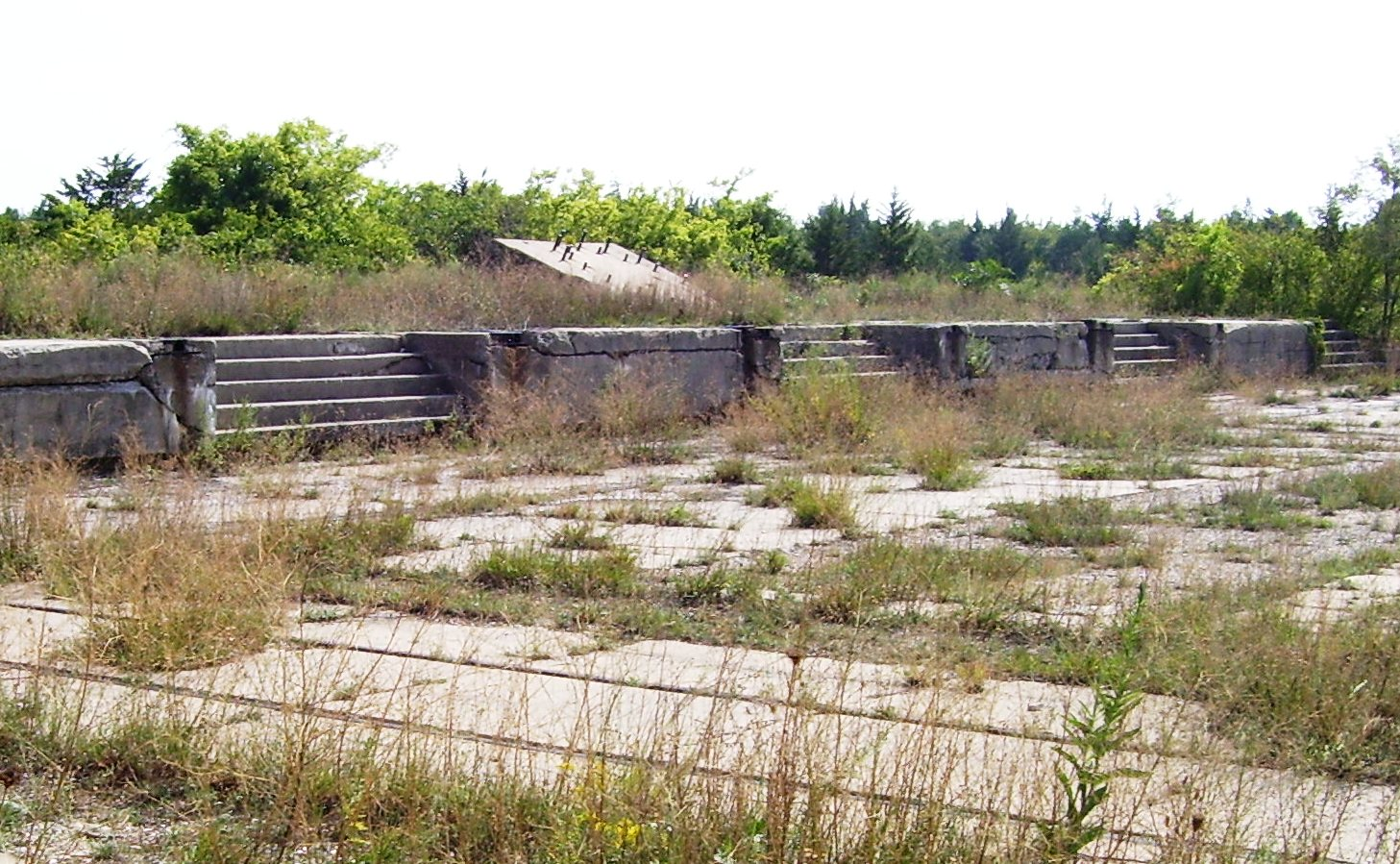
Abandoned gun platforms of the Sandy Hook Proving Ground

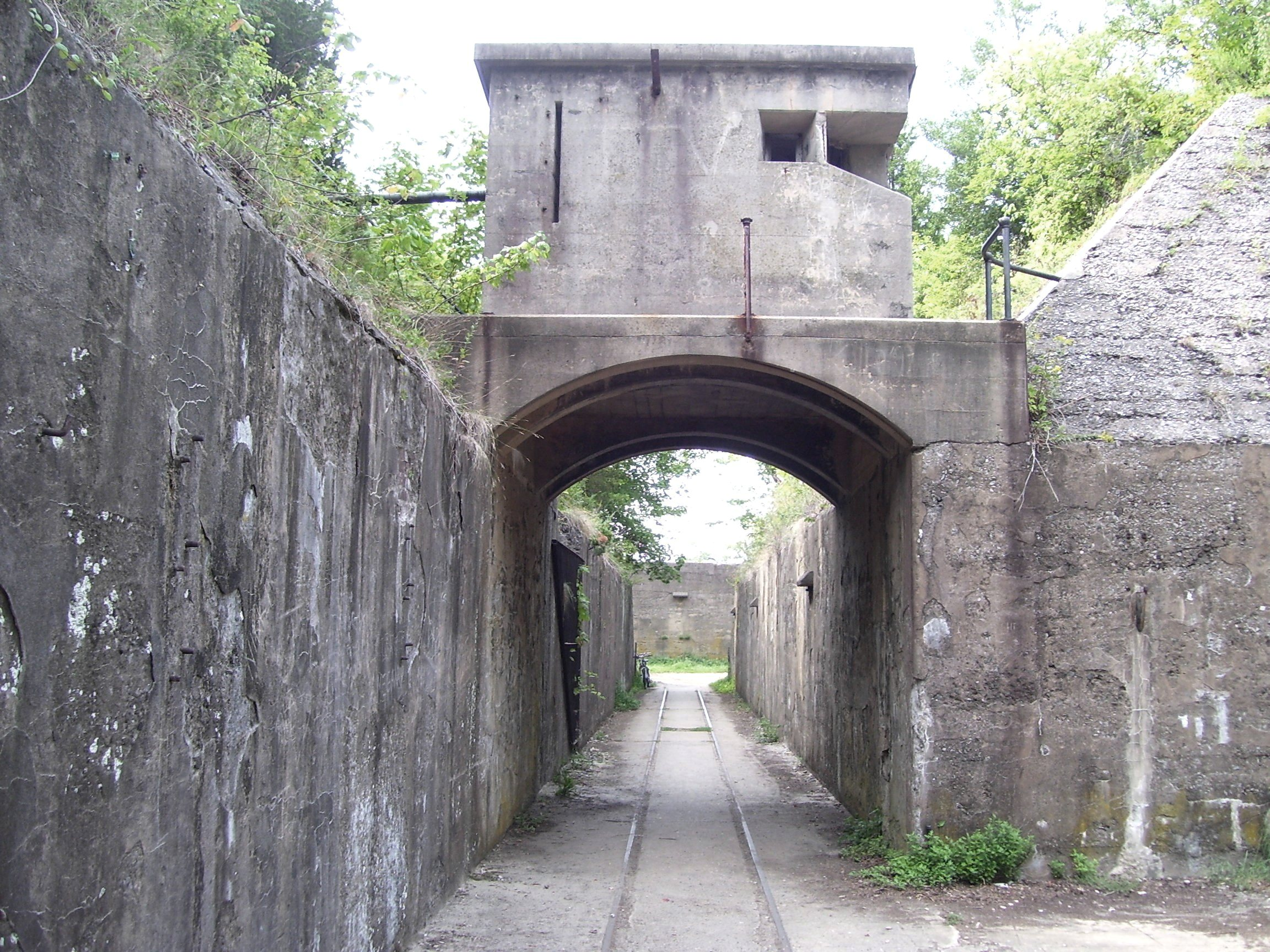
Part of a mortar battery installation near Sandy Hook Light

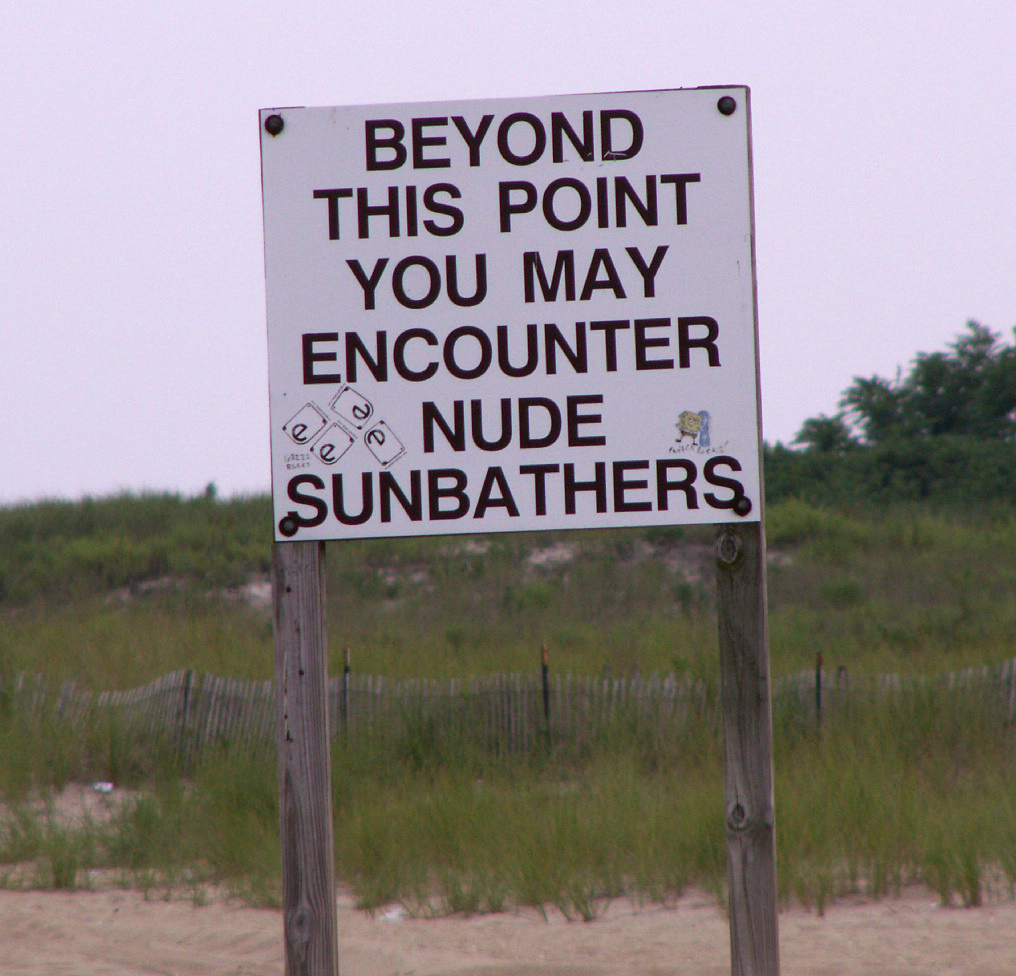
Among the many beaches on Sandy Hook, Gunnison Beach is clothing optional.

== See also ==
- Atlantic Highlands, New Jersey
- Fort Hancock, New Jersey
- Gateway National Recreation Area
- Sandy Hook Light
- Sandy Hook Pilots
- Sandy Hook Proving Ground
- The Leander affair

Preceded by Keansburg	Beaches of New Jersey	Succeeded by Highlands
