= Harbor Defenses of New York =

Coordinates: 40°36′31″N 74°01′56″W

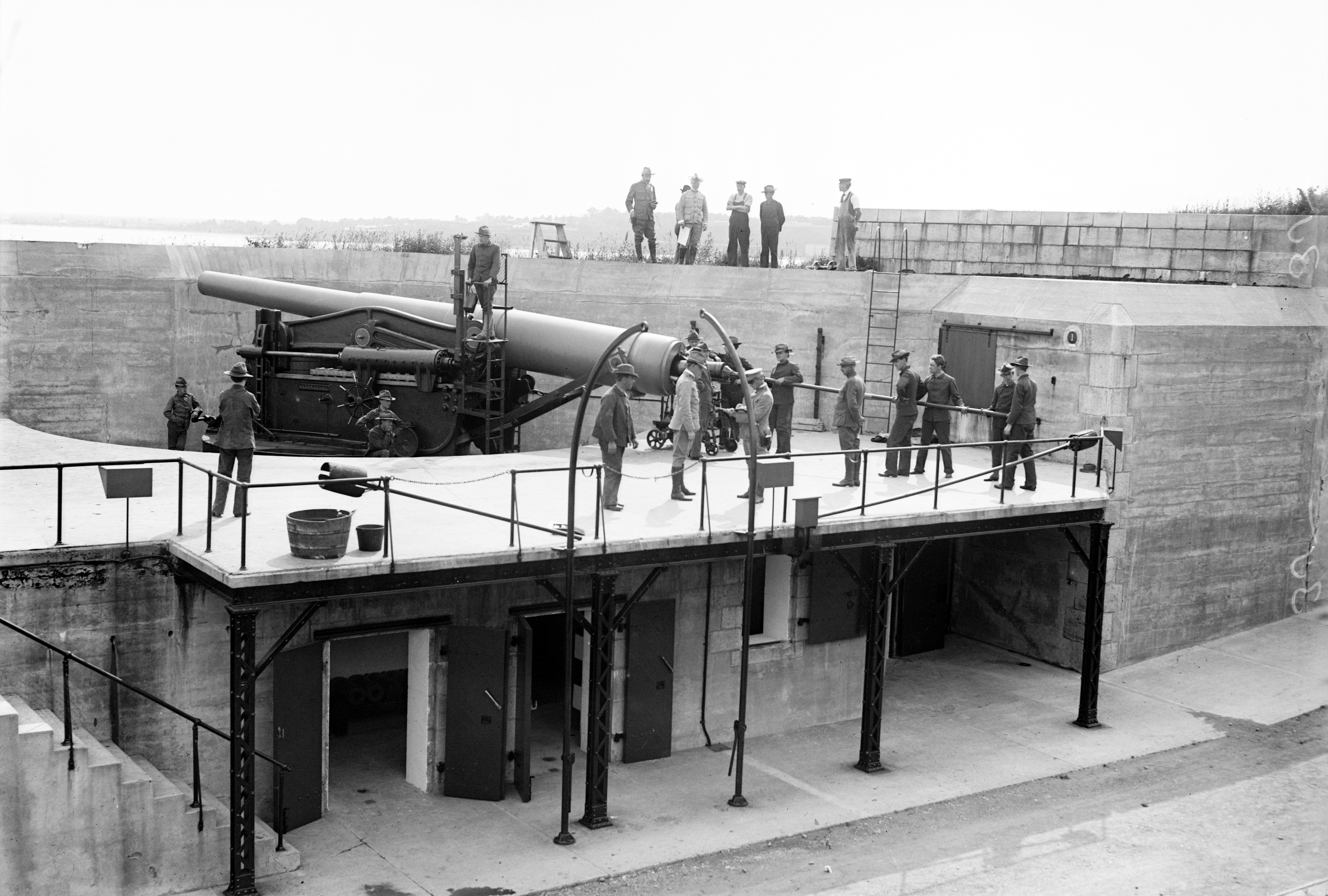
- In June 1908, the 10th Company of the 13th Artillery District, New York National Guard (later the 245th Coast Artillery) loads a 10-inch gun at Fort Hamilton in Brooklyn.
- Active: 1895–1950
- Country: United States
- Branch: United States Army Coast Artillery Corps
- Type: Coast artillery
- Role: Harbor Defense Command
- Part of: First Army 1933–1941; Eastern Defense Command 1941–1945
- Garrison/HQ: Fort Hamilton, Brooklyn, New York
- Mascot: Oozlefinch

The Harbor Defenses of New York was a United States Army Coast Artillery Corps harbor defense command. It coordinated the coast defenses of New York City from 1895 to 1950, beginning with the Endicott program, some of which were located in New Jersey. These included both coast artillery forts and underwater minefields. The command originated c. 1895 as an Artillery District(s) and became the Coast Defenses of Eastern New York and Coast Defenses of Southern New York in 1913. Circa 1915 the Coast Defenses of Sandy Hook separated from the latter command. In 1925 the commands were renamed as Harbor Defense Commands, and in 1935 the Harbor Defenses of Eastern New York was almost entirely disarmed, although possibly retaining the minefield capability. The New York and Sandy Hook commands and the Harbor Defenses of Long Island Sound were unified as the Harbor Defenses of New York on 9 May 1942.

== History ==
=== Early forts in New York City ===
==== Colonial period ====
Giovanni da Verrazzano, an Italian working for France, is credited with being the first European to explore the New York City area, in 1524. He was closely followed the next year by a Spanish expedition led by the Portuguese explorer Estêvão Gomes. In 1542 the French established a fortified trading post known as Fort d'Anormée Berge (Fort of the Grand Scarp), in southern Manhattan on an island in a lake later called Collect Pond. It is unclear when it was disestablished. Dutch settlement of the area began with an expedition in 1609 by Henry Hudson, an Englishman working for the Dutch East India Company, for whom the Hudson River (called the North River in the Dutch period) and other places are named. Other Dutch-sponsored explorers soon followed him, with a blockhouse/trading post in Manhattan by 1612. In 1614 Fort Nassau, a factorij or fortified trading post, was established at what is now Albany, New York. This was the first permanent Dutch settlement in the area, by the New Netherland Company as part of the colony of the same name. This colony was established primarily to exploit the North American fur trade, and grew over the next forty years with fortified settlements from the South River (Delaware River) to what is now Rhode Island.

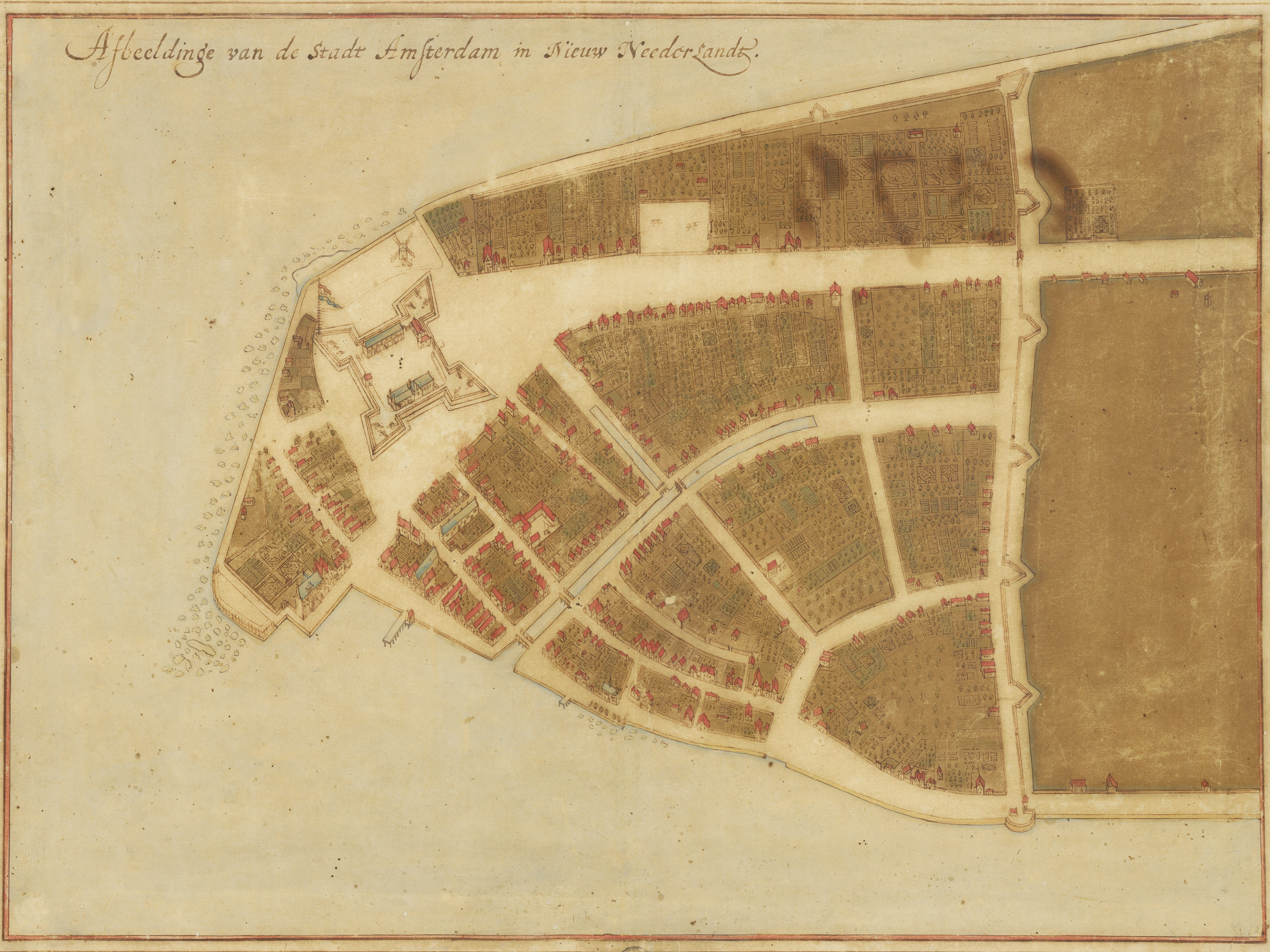
Map of New Amsterdam showing Fort Amsterdam and the wall, published 1660 (north is to the right).

In 1621 the Dutch West India Company took over management of New Netherland and other Dutch possessions in the New World. In 1624, after floods showed that Fort Nassau was untenable, it was replaced with Fort Orange. Also in that year, Dutch settlement of what became New York City began with a colony on Noten Eylandt (Nut or Nutten Island, now Governors Island). The next year the colony moved to Manhattoes (now southern Manhattan) to establish New Amsterdam, which has been settled ever since, and built Fort Amsterdam to protect themselves. In 1653 the wall at what is now Wall Street was added for protection from potential English attack. In 1655 Peter Stuyvesant led an expedition that subjugated the New Sweden colony along the Delaware River. In that same year, several hundred Munsee briefly occupied New Amsterdam during the Peach War and caused significant damage and loss of life in Pavonia and on Staten Island. In 1664 an English expedition arrived in what is now New York Harbor and demanded the colony's surrender. Stuyvesant felt the colony could not defend itself, regretting that his prior requests for troops and defensive resources from the Dutch West India Company had not been met, and on 8 September he surrendered New Netherland to the English. The English renamed the city "New York" at this time and established the Province of New York from the former New Netherland, also establishing the Province of New Jersey the next year. The colony was named for its nominal ruler, James, Duke of York, who later became King James II of England. Fort Amsterdam was renamed Fort James in his honor. Lingering resentment over the takeover was a cause of the Second Anglo-Dutch War in 1665. This ended with the Treaty of Breda in 1667, which made the English takeover official. In 1673, during the Third Anglo-Dutch War, the Dutch seized New York from the English, but the English regained the colony the following year via the Treaty of Westminster that ended that war.

The Signal Hill site on Staten Island at The Narrows, eventually known as Fort Wadsworth, was first fortified with a blockhouse by Dutch settler David Pieterszen de Vries in 1636. This blockhouse was destroyed in the Peach Tree War of 1655. The site is said to have been "continuously garrisoned" since another blockhouse was built in 1663 until the fort's closure in 1994, making it the oldest such site in the Thirteen Colonies until that time. The 1663 blockhouse survived at least through 1808; sources state that it was enclosed intact by the first Fort Tompkins at that time.

James II proved to be deeply unpopular in England, and he was deposed in the "Glorious Revolution" of 1688, being replaced by William and Mary. Some of James' colonial governors were not immediately replaced, and some of these were unpopular in the colonies they governed. Shortly before James' overthrow New England, New York, and New Jersey were combined as the Dominion of New England, with Edmund Andros as governor in Boston and Francis Nicholson as lieutenant governor in New York. In 1689 many of the locally recruited militia in both cities revolted as the Boston Revolt in April and Leisler's Rebellion at the end of May. Both Andros and Nicholson were imprisoned, and the New England colonies re-established their governments. In Boston the rebellion was soon over, but in New York Jacob Leisler acted as de facto governor of the province for nearly two years. The French took advantage of the situation by raiding Schenectady with their Indian allies in February 1690, causing Leisler to divert most of his resources to an unsuccessful retaliatory expedition against New France. On 19 March 1691 the newly appointed royal governor Henry Sloughter arrived in New York and imprisoned Leisler and several of the rebellion's leaders. Leisler and one other were executed on 16 May.

The fort in Manhattan went through several name changes from 1685 through 1714, finally becoming Fort George. In 1699 the wall that Wall Street is named for was dismantled.

New York City was a base for British operations in the French and Indian War (the North American theater of the Seven Years' War) from 1754 to 1763. That conflict united the colonies for the first time in common defense, and ended by eliminating the French military threat that the colonists had relied upon Britain to defend them from. In 1765 the British Parliament imposed a Stamp Act to augment local expenditures for defending the colonies. One result was that delegates from nine colonies met to protest at what would later be known as Federal Hall in Manhattan as the Stamp Act Congress, protesting "taxation without representation". In November of that year a committee of the Sons of Liberty was established in New York.

==== Revolutionary War ====
In April 1775 the American Revolution broke out full-scale at Lexington and Concord in Massachusetts. In March 1776 Patriot forces captured Boston. Their commander, General George Washington, thought the evacuating British force would immediately attempt to capture New York and sent troops to the city, soon followed by himself. Several forts were built by the patriots in the New York City area in June and July 1776, including Fort Washington in northwestern Manhattan and Fort Constitution (later Fort Lee) across the Hudson in the town later named for it. Both forts were just south of the current George Washington Bridge. Fort Lee was named for Patriot general Charles Lee. A chevaux de frise barrier was placed in the Hudson between the two forts to prevent ships passing. Both forts were hastily built and had few defensive features, even lacking ditches. Another fort that proved important was a set of batteries on Nutten Island (now called Governor's Island). Numerous small forts were also built in the city.

On 3 July 1776 the British landed unopposed on Staten Island and soon captured Flagstaff Fort on Signal Hill, later the site of Fort Wadsworth. The British forces were under General Sir William Howe. They included troops evacuated from Boston along with reinforcements, some of which were Hessian troops from Germany. On 4 July 1776 a small American battery called the Narrows Fort, on the site of the later Fort Hamilton (the Brooklyn side of the Narrows), fired into one of the British men-of-war convoying the British invasion force. HMS Asia suffered damage and casualties, but opposition to the immense fleet could be little more than symbolic. However, the Nutten Island batteries engaged HMS Phoenix and HMS Rose on 12 July 1776; this may have made the British cautious about entering the East River. In late August the British landed in Brooklyn and on 27 August the Battle of Long Island was fought, the largest battle of the Revolution in total number of troops engaged. Washington's forces were thrown back to their fortifications on Brooklyn Heights, and soon made a withdrawal under cover of night and fog across the East River to Manhattan, unimpeded by the Royal Navy.

On 6 September the submarine Turtle made the first recorded submarine attack in history in New York Harbor. This one-man hand-powered submarine had been built the previous year by David Bushnell, an inventor from Connecticut. Turtle was crewed by Sergeant Ezra Lee, also from Connecticut. Lee reported that he attempted to attack HMS Eagle, flagship of Admiral Sir Richard Howe, brother of the general. Turtle was equipped to attach a mine (called a "torpedo" in those days) to a ship by means of a spike or possibly an auger. Lee reported that he was unable to attach the mine to the ship, and surfaced and retreated. He also stated that British boats approached him from Governors Island, so he released the mine, which exploded. On 5 October another attempt was made, but Lee withdrew when the target's crew spotted him. Later that month the British captured Turtle and scuttled her near Fort Lee, New Jersey, although Bushnell may have salvaged her later. Her final fate is unknown.

During the Long Island battle the British had captured General John Sullivan. Admiral Howe convinced him to deliver a message to the Continental Congress in Philadelphia, and released him on parole. Washington also gave his permission, and on 2 September Sullivan told the Congress that the Howes wanted to negotiate, and had been given much broader powers to treat than those they actually held. This created a diplomatic problem for Congress, which did not want to be seen as aggressive. Consequently, Congress agreed to send a committee to meet with the Howes in a move they did not think would bear any fruit. On 11 September, the Howe brothers met with John Adams, Benjamin Franklin, and Edward Rutledge in the Staten Island Peace Conference. The Americans insisted on retaining independence as expressed in the Declaration of Independence, and the Howes said they had no authority to allow that, and specifically regarded the patriot delegates as British subjects. So the war continued.

On 15 September the British landed in southern Manhattan and quickly took the city, which only extended to the southern part of the island at the time. Washington felt the city could not be defended, and held out on the high ground around Fort Washington now known as Washington Heights, successfully repulsing a British attack the next day in the Battle of Harlem Heights. After a standoff of nearly a month, the British attempted to outflank Washington by landing in southeastern Westchester County, initially thwarted at Throgs Neck on 12 October, but overcoming opposition at Pelham on 18 October. Washington moved the bulk of his forces northward, fighting the Battle of White Plains on 28 October. Although the Patriots were pushed back in that battle, Howe waited four days for reinforcements before following them, and the Patriots were able to retreat to high ground. Howe and Henry Clinton, one of his principal subordinates, had been in command at the costly British victory in the Battle of Bunker Hill in June 1775, and a desire to avoid heavy casualties in assaults on fortified positions seems to have colored their actions through the rest of the war. In mid-November Howe returned to Manhattan, capturing Fort Washington and taking 3,000 prisoners, and within a few days also capturing Fort Lee. Washington retreated to northern New Jersey. In early December Howe detached a force under Cornwallis to pursue Washington (who retreated to Pennsylvania), and sent a naval force carrying 6,000 troops under Clinton to seize and occupy Newport, Rhode Island, where they remained for nearly three years.

In early 1777 the British planned to cut New England off from the rest of the colonies by sending a force under John Burgoyne southward from Montreal through the Lake Champlain area and the Hudson Valley to Albany. This was intended to be supported by a force under Howe advancing northward from New York City. However, George Germain, a British civilian official managing the war in London, also gave approval for Howe to capture Philadelphia. Howe proceeded with the Philadelphia plan and failed to support Burgoyne's campaign. The Philadelphia campaign was time-consuming but successful; the British took a lengthy water route through Chesapeake Bay, marched overland to defeat Washington at the Battle of Brandywine on 11 September, and entered Philadelphia unopposed on 26 September. However, by that time the initial success of Burgoyne's campaign had come to a defeat in the first of the Battles of Saratoga, at Freeman's Farm on 19 September. Shortly after this, Henry Clinton, having returned from the Rhode Island expedition, moved north from New York City and on 6 October successfully attacked Forts Clinton and Montgomery, just north of Bear Mountain on the Hudson. Clinton's expedition also raided as far north as Kingston. However, all three dispatch riders sent to inform Burgoyne of their success were captured, so Burgoyne was unaware of this. Following defeat at Bemis Heights on 7 October and a subsequent siege, Burgoyne surrendered his army on 17 October. This victory persuaded France to enter the war on the Patriot side. Word of it reached Commissioner Benjamin Franklin in Paris on 4 December, and negotiations resulted in France declaring war on Britain in March 1778. Howe resigned his command and Henry Clinton took charge of the British force in Philadelphia. Due to the French naval threat, Clinton was ordered to abandon Philadelphia and bring his army to New York City. The British left Philadelphia on 18 June. Washington's army shadowed Clinton's, and Washington successfully forced a battle at Monmouth Courthouse on 28 June, the last major battle in the North. By July, Clinton was in New York City, and Washington was again at White Plains, New York. Both armies were back where they had been two years earlier. The military focus of the war shifted to the southern colonies. Eventually, the American victory in the Yorktown campaign on 19 October 1781 proved to be the key to independence; the British received word of it on 25 November. This precipitated a collapse of Lord North's Tory government in March 1782. The new Whig government suspended offensive operations in the Thirteen Colonies and commenced lengthy peace negotiations, culminating in the Treaty of Paris that ended the war on 3 September 1783. On 25 November the British forces departed New York City; this is remembered as Evacuation Day.

==== 1783-War of 1812 ====
Unlike most other harbors, post-independence fort-building in New York was begun by the state rather than the federal government. The former Fort Amsterdam was demolished in 1790. The series of forts completed nationwide circa 1794 to 1800 later became known as the first system of US seacoast fortifications. In New York this was initially limited to the large Fort Jay on Governors Island, along with some small batteries on Oyster Island (later Ellis Island) and Bedloe's Island (later Liberty Island). These were simple earthworks at the time. Congress contributed to building Fort Jay in 1797, and in 1800 the state sold the fort, Governors Island, and Bedloe's Island to the federal government for one dollar. Oyster Island was similarly transferred in 1808. The federal government commenced building improved stone forts at all three locations.

In June 1807, the Chesapeake–Leopard affair caused a war scare with Britain that accelerated a round of fort-building in the US. This was later called the second system of US fortifications. New York Harbor became the most heavily fortified place in the United States as a result, probably the reason it was never attacked in the subsequent War of 1812. The federal forts included a complete rebuild of Fort Jay with granite and brick, mounting 60 guns, begun in 1806. At some point in 1806–07 the new fort was renamed Fort Columbus. It was joined on Governors Island by the unique, mostly circular Castle Williams, built 1807–1811. This was the United States' first multi-tiered fort, mounting 78 guns in three of its four tiers (one tier, although casemated, was used as barracks space). The South Battery was built on Governors Island in 1812 to guard Buttermilk Channel. Fort Wood (now the base for the Statue of Liberty) was built on Bedloe's Island from 1806 to 1811 as a stone 11-pointed star fort mounting 24 guns. Crown Fort (later Fort Gibson) was built on Oyster Island circa 1808 as a circular stone fort with 14 guns and a mortar battery. Castle Clinton (initially the West Battery) was built in 1809, a bit west of the southern tip of Manhattan on an artificial island that has since been enclosed by land reclamation. It remains as an oval stone fort for 28 guns. Another battery under construction in 1808 and completed by 1811 was the 16-gun North Battery, built in the Hudson River of stone, connected by a bridge to the west end of Hubert Street in Manhattan.

New York state acquired the Signal Hill site on Staten Island in 1806; the site was eventually named Fort Wadsworth in the 1890s. The state commenced building four forts in the area. These included the red sandstone Fort Richmond (on the site now called Battery Weed) and Fort Tompkins, on the sites of the current forts but of different design, and Forts Morton and Hudson, with positions for a total of 164 guns in the four forts. Fort Richmond was initially semicircular while Fort Tompkins was a regular pentagon with circular bastions, both very different from their Third System replacements. These forts were contemporary with the federal second system but not part of it. Fort Tompkins was primarily a land defense fort, on Signal Hill to the rear of the other three forts.

The outbreak of the War of 1812 accelerated fort construction in New York. Fort Gansevoort was built in 1812 near the west end of 12th Street in Manhattan. Fort Lafayette, a diamond-shaped stone fort with 72 guns on an artificial island near Brooklyn in the Narrows, was begun in 1815 and completed in 1822. Numerous small forts were also erected in the city. An example of a fort built with local resources was Fort Masonic in Brooklyn, built in 1814 partly by the Freemasons, a fraternal society that many Founding Fathers and early presidents of the United States were members of. The forts around Signal Hill on Staten Island were augmented by numerous batteries; reportedly over 900 cannon were amassed in the area by the war's end in 1815.

==== 1816–1890 ====
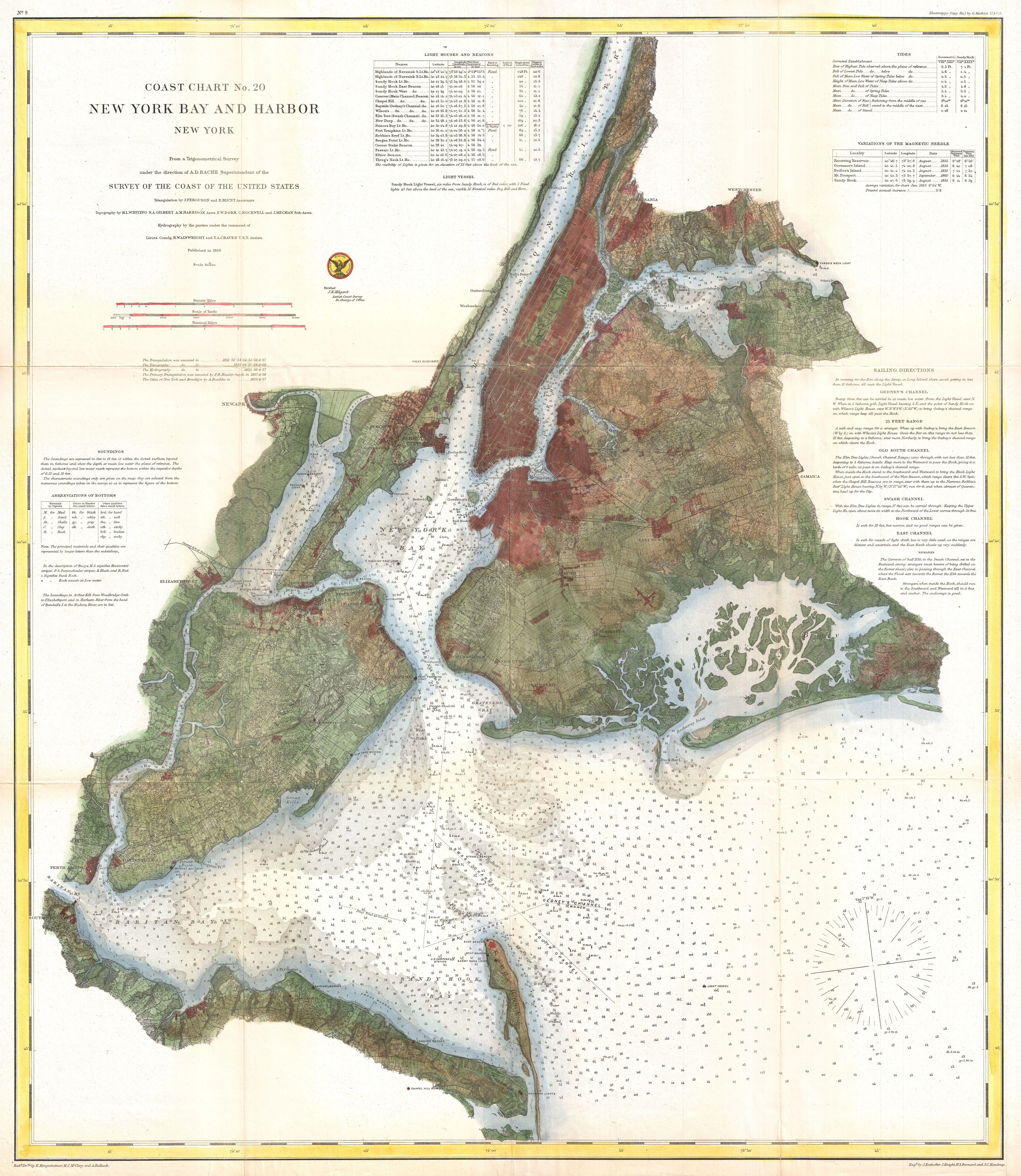
1866 United States Coast Survey chart of New York Bay and Harbor, showing most of the city's forts.

Although New York was not attacked in the War of 1812, Washington, DC was captured and burned due to inadequate defenses locally and in the Chesapeake Bay area. A new series of masonry forts, larger than previous US forts, was proposed and became the third system of US seacoast fortifications. Funding was slow, with most forts not begun until the 1830s and several still unfinished in 1867, when building of masonry forts was halted. The New York area received six major forts under this program; initial plans for the latter four of these are said to have been drawn up by Robert E. Lee during his tenure as post engineer at Fort Hamilton in the 1840s. Fort Hamilton in Brooklyn was the first of these forts, built 1825–1831 primarily as a land defense for Fort Lafayette. Fort Schuyler on Throgs Neck in the Bronx was built 1833–1856, defending the approach to the city from Long Island Sound. Forts Richmond and Tompkins (in the area later named Fort Wadsworth) were considered unfit for use by 1835; however, it took over a decade for the federal and state governments to arrive at a purchase agreement; work finally began on replacement forts in 1847. The two new forts were still incomplete but ready for service when the Civil War broke out in 1861. The Fort at Sandy Hook in New Jersey (later Fort Hancock) was begun in 1857, but only its seaward casemates were completed when work stopped in 1867. The Fort at Willets Point (in Queens opposite Fort Schuyler, later Fort Totten) was not begun until 1862, and only one of a planned four tiers of casemates was completed.

Although no combat of any kind took place nearby, New York City was important to the Union war effort in the Civil War. As the principal entry point for immigrants and having a large prewar population, the city provided a large share of the Union's personnel. It was also the most important media center. Paradoxically, by late 1864 the city was also a center for the Peace Democrats, and Lincoln carried New York state in that election by less than one percent. One of the most tragic events in the city's history was the draft riots of 13–16 July 1863, sparked by the implementation of military conscription by the federal government. At least 120 persons were killed. There were few troops in the city to deal with the riots, and some members of the forts' garrisons most likely served in riot control. A Confederate plot to start fires in the city on Election Day in 1864 was initially forestalled, but was executed on 25 November. Fires were set at some hotels, P. T. Barnum's museum, and other landmarks. The majority of the conspirators escaped to Canada. However, former Confederate officer Robert Cobb Kennedy was arrested, court-martialed, and hanged at Fort Lafayette on 25 March 1865. Fort Lafayette and possibly other forts in New York served as prisons for Confederate POWs and political prisoners. In 1865 Fort Richmond was renamed Fort Wadsworth to honor General James S. Wadsworth, killed in the Civil War the previous year.

The Civil War had shown that masonry forts were vulnerable to modern rifled cannon, particularly in the siege of Fort Pulaski near Savannah, Georgia in 1862. Also, the 15-inch (381 mm) smoothbore Rodman gun was introduced during the war. However, the Civil War's Parrott rifles had proven prone to bursting, and although many were retained in service until the 1900s, no new weapons of this type were procured after the war. To provide heavy rifled guns, many 8-inch (203 mm) "converted" rifles were produced postwar by adding liners to 10-inch smoothbore Rodman guns. New earth-protected batteries were constructed in the 1870s at a number of locations to provide more survivable forts armed with the new Rodman weapons. One of the first of these was a 27-gun battery at the Fort at Willets Point, where the US Engineer Battalion was stationed in 1866 and the Engineer School of Application was established in 1868. The school's first commander, Major Henry Larcom Abbot, worked on projects that paved the way for the Army's future coast defense efforts. He developed the "Abbot Quad" arrangement for mortar batteries with a 16-mortar battery at Willets Point, and pioneered a modern controlled underwater minefield system at Willets Point and Fort Schuyler, both of these in the 1870s. New earthen batteries were also built or begun at Fort Wadsworth, Fort Hamilton, and Fort Schuyler. The Sandy Hook Proving Ground was established near the abandoned, incomplete Fort at Sandy Hook in 1874 to test coast defense weapons. However, in the late 1870s coast defense funding was cut off, and it was nearly 20 years before new coast defenses began to enter service.

=== Endicott period ===
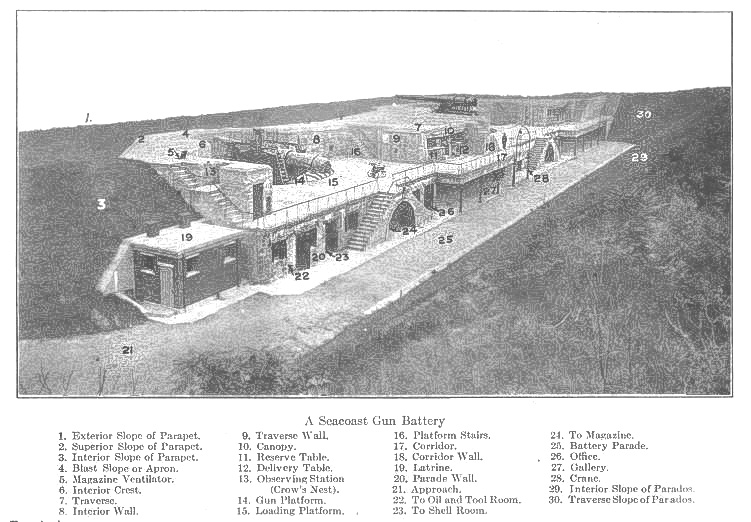
Typical US disappearing gun battery for two guns.

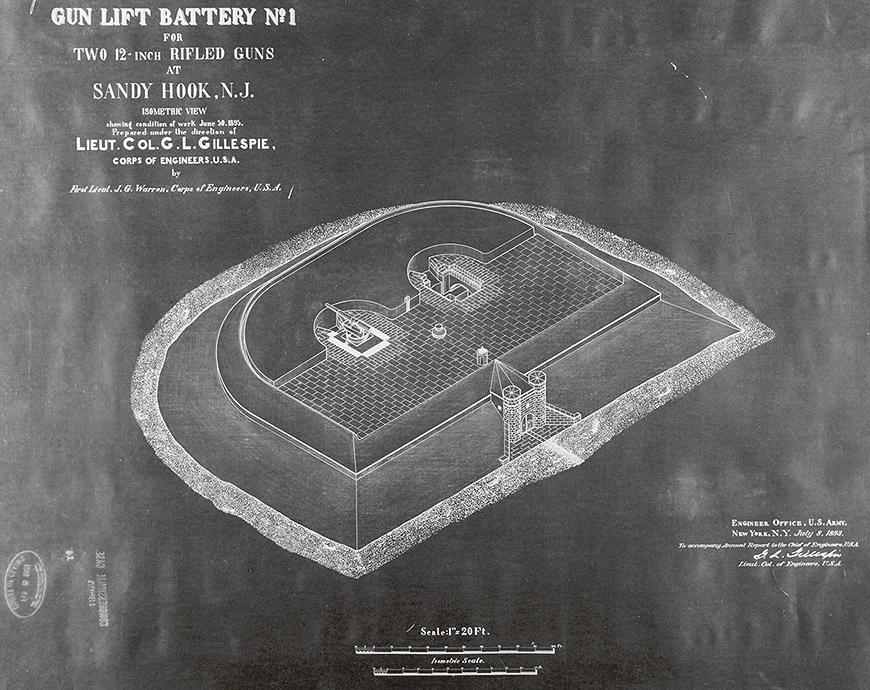
Drawing of the unique Gun Lift Battery at Fort Hancock.

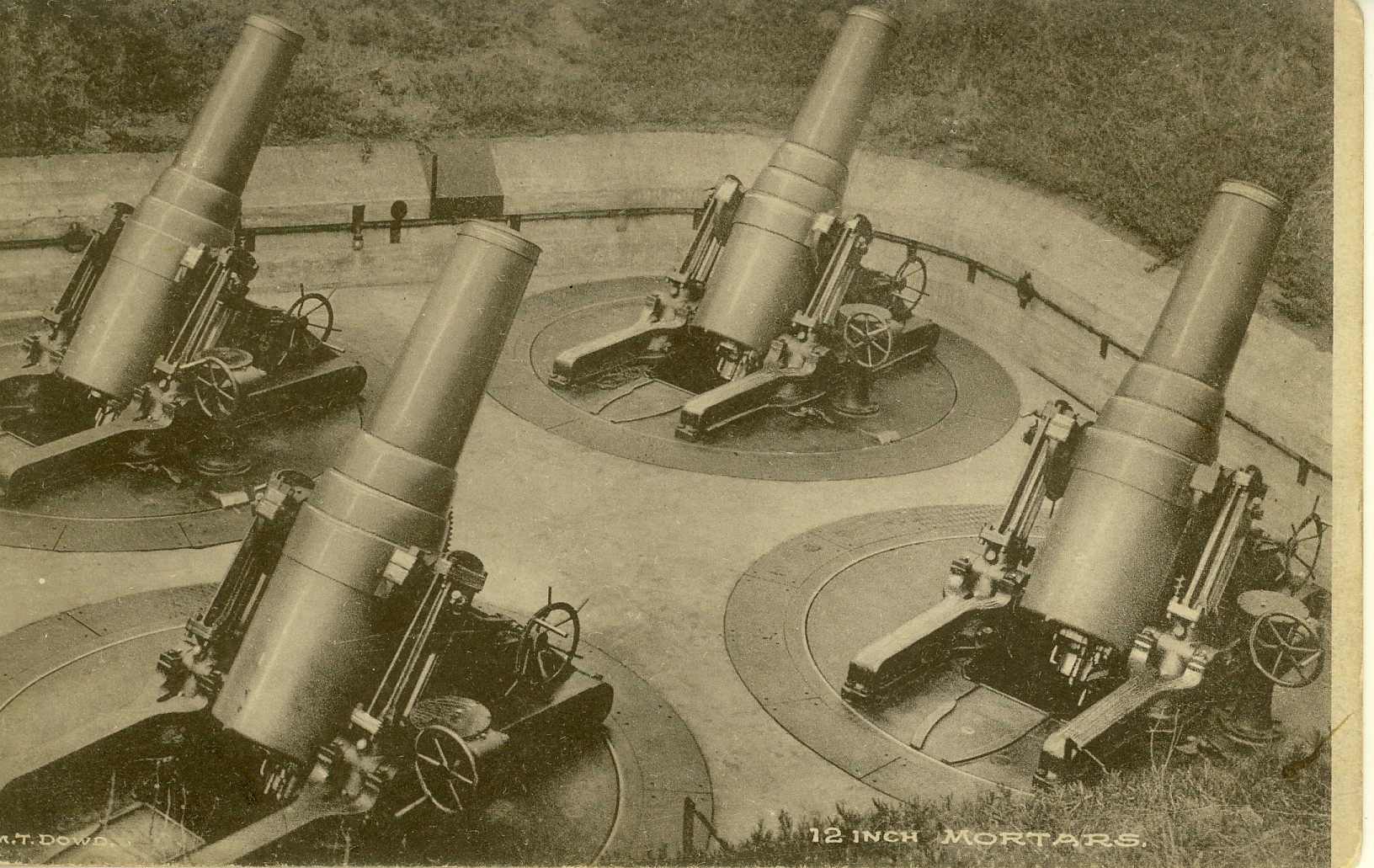
12-inch mortars, similar to those at Fort Hancock and Fort Slocum.

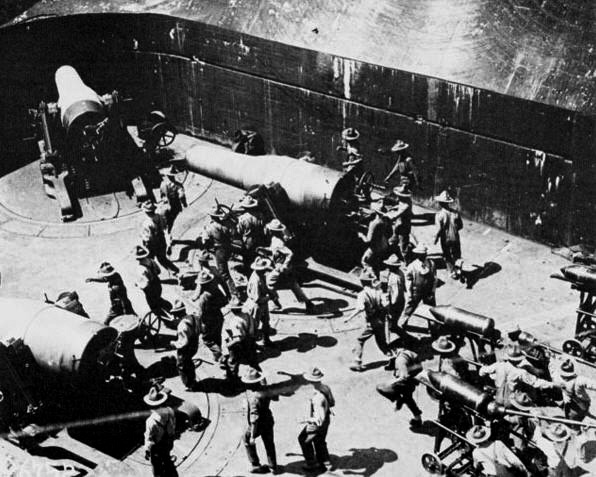
This photo shows a mortar pit of the Abbot Quad period. This illustrates the difficulty of reloading four mortars in this configuration. Three of four mortars and 30 soldiers are visible in the crowded space.

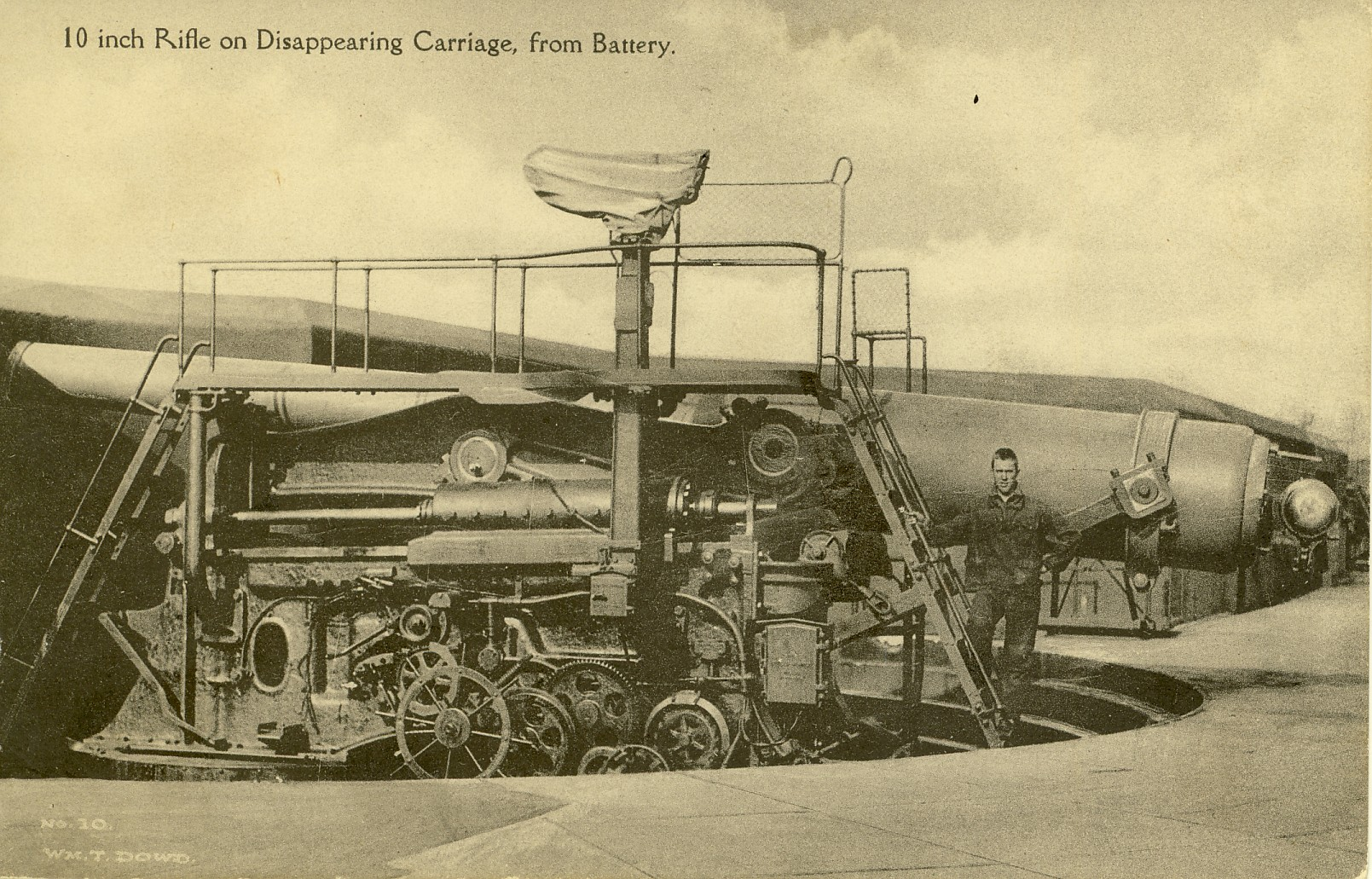
10-inch gun M1888 on disappearing carriage M1896, similar to other large disappearing guns.

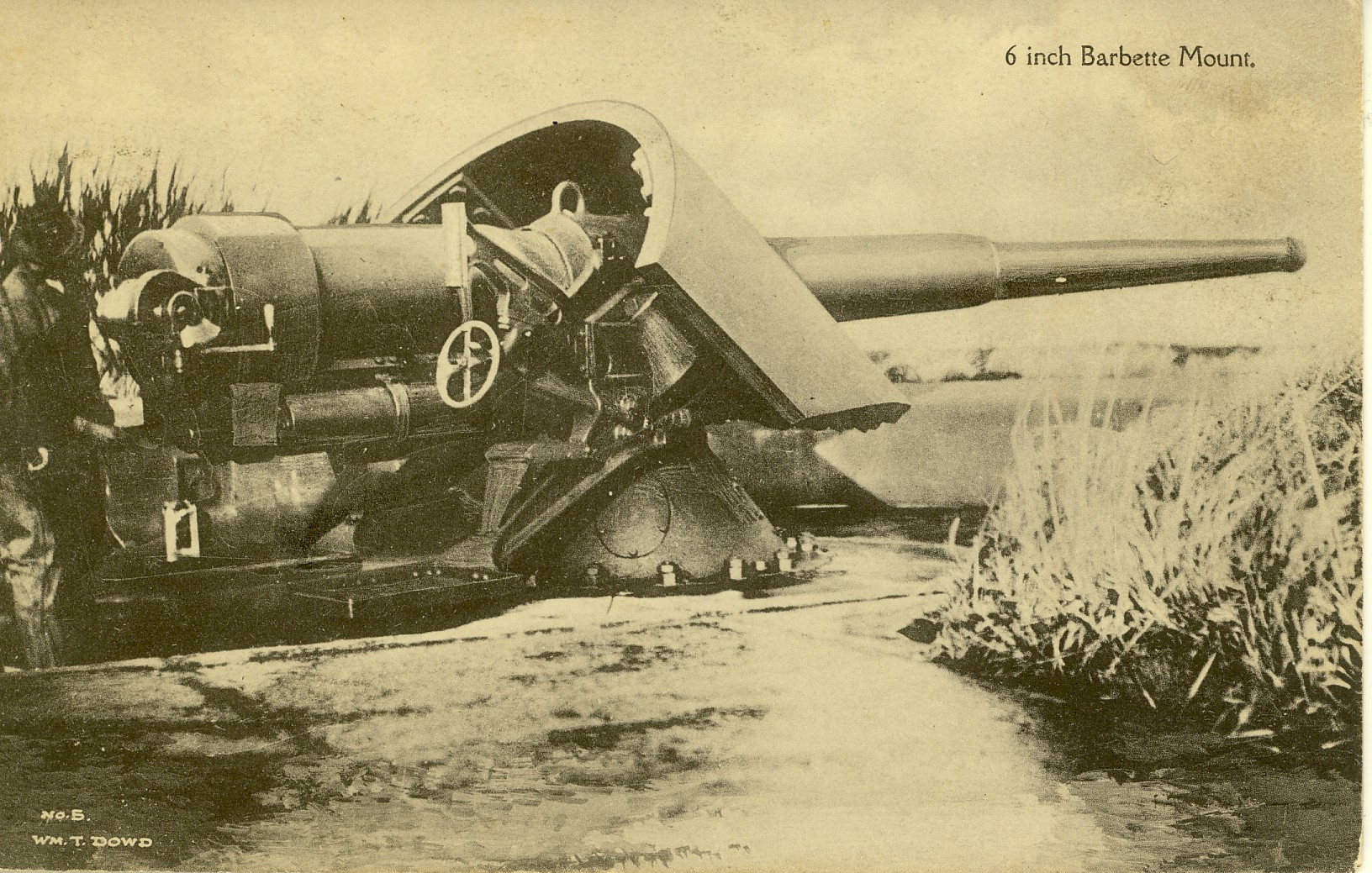
6-inch gun M1900 on pedestal mount M1900, similar to two surviving weapons at Battery Gunnison, Fort Hancock.

The Board of Fortifications was convened in 1885 under Secretary of War William Crowninshield Endicott to develop recommendations for a full replacement of existing coast defenses. Most of its recommendations were adopted, and construction began in 1890 on new batteries and controlled minefields to defend New York City, mostly near existing forts. Fort Hancock was the first to begin construction, followed by the other Endicott forts and batteries over the next ten years.

One of the Endicott program's policies was to officially assign each fort and battery a name, in most cases a deceased Regular Army or Continental Army officer's name; the fort's name usually included the entire military reservation it was on. In the 1890s and early 1900s the Fort at Willets Point became Fort Totten, the Fort at Sandy Hook became Fort Hancock, and the entire Signal Hill area (except Fort Tompkins) became Fort Wadsworth (with the previous Fort Wadsworth renamed Battery Weed). Another renaming occurred in 1904 as one of Elihu Root's last acts as Secretary of War, that of reverting Fort Columbus to its original name of Fort Jay.

In addition to Forts Totten, Hancock, and Wadsworth, new batteries were built at Fort Hamilton, Fort Schuyler, and the new Fort Slocum on Davids Island near New Rochelle, New York, which was in the approach to Forts Totten and Schuyler. In most cases the new batteries were built near the previous forts; however, about two-thirds of Fort Hamilton was demolished to make room for Endicott batteries, and almost all of the Fort at Sandy Hook was demolished to build Fort Hancock and expand the proving ground. Forts Hancock, Hamilton, and Wadsworth were the Coast Defenses of Southern New York and Forts Schuyler, Totten, and Slocum were the Coast Defenses of Eastern New York. These appear to have initially been Artillery Districts, were renamed as Coast Defense Commands in 1913, and again renamed as Harbor Defense Commands in 1924.

Fort Hancock's first batteries were prototypes. The first was the Gun Lift Battery (later Battery Potter) and the second was the Sandy Hook Mortar Battery (later Battery Reynolds-McCook). The Endicott Program centered on disappearing guns, which would remain concealed behind a concrete-and-earth parapet until raised to fire. Most of the weapons in the program were mounted on Buffington-Crozier disappearing carriages. However, early on there was doubt that this carriage could successfully raise and lower a 12-inch (305 mm) gun. The alternative developed was the gun lift carriage, essentially a barbette carriage mounted on a hydraulic elevator. A steam plant powered the hydraulic system. The gun lift system proved expensive to build and operate, as the steam plant had to be running continuously to provide pressure for elevator operation. Other early 12-inch gun installations (and a few smaller early installations) were on simple non-disappearing barbette carriages until Buffington-Crozier carriages were developed for later installations. For 12-inch guns, the first disappearing carriage was the M1896. Although a few other installations such as Battery Torbert at Fort Delaware were begun as gun lift batteries, these were completed with disappearing guns, and Battery Potter was the only gun lift battery completed. In 1903 Battery Potter was named for Joseph H. Potter, a Civil War general. By 1907 several additional batteries were built at Fort Hancock, and with the construction of Battery Arrowsmith underway to cover its sector, Battery Potter was disarmed.

The Sandy Hook Mortar Battery was a battery of 16 12-inch (305 mm) mortars in the "Abbot Quad" arrangement, pioneered at the Fort at Willets Point twenty years earlier by Henry Larcom Abbot. This was designed to place the mortars as closely together as possible, in the hope of scoring multiple hits on an enemy ship by firing simultaneously. The battery had four pits in a square arrangement, with four mortars per pit, also in a square. The pits were separated by walls and were surrounded by a high concrete wall covered with earth for land defense. This arrangement was used at a number of early Endicott forts. However, simultaneously reloading the mortars in each pit proved cumbersome, and in later forts the pits were arranged in a line with open backs. During World War I the two rear mortars in each pit were removed at most forts to further improve reloading and provide weapons for a railway artillery program.

Fort Hancock had another unusual battery from 1896 to 1902, "Battery Dynamite" with two 15-inch (381 mm) and one 8-inch (203 mm) pneumatic dynamite guns. These guns used compressed air to fire a large projectile loaded with dynamite. However, the projectile's velocity was too low for effective fire control against moving targets, and the weapon was abandoned in the early 1900s.

The initial armament of the forts was quite extensive. The Coast Defenses of Southern New York (CD Southern New York) were as follows: by the end of 1905 Fort Hancock on Sandy Hook, New Jersey, had eight 12-inch (305 mm) guns, sixteen 12-inch mortars, five 10-inch (254 mm) guns, four 6-inch (152 mm) guns, one 5-inch (127 mm) gun, and four 3-inch guns. Fort Hamilton in Brooklyn had six 12-inch guns, eight 12-inch mortars, seven 10-inch guns, fourteen 6-inch guns, two 4.72-inch guns, and four 3-inch guns. Fort Wadsworth on Staten Island had eight 12-inch guns, four 10-inch guns, five 8-inch (203 mm) guns, four 6-inch guns, two 4.72-inch guns, and fourteen 3-inch guns.

Also by the end of 1905, the Coast Defenses of Eastern New York (CD Eastern New York) had at Fort Slocum on Davids Island sixteen 12-inch mortars, two 6-inch guns, and two 5-inch guns. Fort Schuyler on Throgs Neck had two 12-inch guns, two 10-inch guns, two 5-inch guns, and two 3-inch guns. Fort Totten in Queens had eight 12-inch mortars, two 12-inch guns, two 10-inch guns, two 8-inch guns, two 5-inch guns, and six 3-inch guns.

Generally, the heavy batteries were built first, followed by the 3-inch and then the 6-inch batteries. However, the Spanish–American War broke out in early 1898. Most of the Endicott batteries were still years from completion, and it was feared the Spanish fleet would bombard the US east coast. A number of batteries of medium-caliber rapid-fire guns were hastily built, along with batteries of Civil War-era smoothbore Rodman guns. Fort Wadsworth and Fort Hamilton each received a pair of 4.72-inch (120 mm) Armstrong guns, purchased from the United Kingdom, 40 calibers long at Fort Wadsworth and 45 calibers long at Fort Hamilton. Fort Wadsworth also received a pair of 6-inch (152 mm) Armstrong guns. Batteries for a total of six 8-inch (203 mm) guns were also built at locations that are unclear from references, including three modern 8-inch M1888 guns on modified 1870s Rodman carriages and three 8-inch Rodman converted rifles. At least two of the M1888 guns were at Fort Wadsworth.

In 1907, with the completion of the Coast Defenses of Long Island Sound on islands to the east of Long Island, Fort Slocum was deemed surplus and removed from its coast defense command. However, the fort retained its guns until the United States entered World War I. Three 8-inch guns and six 3-inch guns were added at Fort Hancock by 1910. In 1913 Fort Hamilton's pair of 4.72-inch/45 caliber guns was moved to Hawaii, due to centralizing this type of weapon there. In 1915 the battery of five 8-inch guns at Fort Wadsworth was disarmed and abandoned due to inferior concrete. At some time prior to 1917 Fort Hancock separated from CD Southern New York as the Coast Defenses of Sandy Hook (CD Sandy Hook).

=== World War I ===
Although neutral in the early part of World War I, the United States was producing munitions (primarily artillery ammunition) for the Allies: the British blockade of Germany prevented trade with the Central Powers after 1915. The Black Tom explosion occurred at an ammunition storage area in Jersey City, New Jersey, near Liberty Island, on 30 July 1916. It broke windows in lower Manhattan and damaged the Statue of Liberty's raised arm; since then tourists have not been allowed to visit the torch. The blast was initially reported as an accident, but years later was acknowledged to be sabotage by agents working directly and indirectly for Germany.

The American entry into World War I in April 1917 brought many changes to the Coast Artillery and the coast defense commands in the New York area. Numerous temporary buildings were constructed at the forts to accommodate the wartime mobilization. As the only component of the Army with heavy artillery experience and significant manpower, the Coast Artillery was chosen to operate almost all US-manned heavy and railway artillery in that war. At most coast defense commands, garrisons were drawn down to provide experienced gun crews on the Western Front, mostly using French- and British-made weapons. However, this did not initially occur at CD Southern New York, where some batteries were directed to be ready to fire 24/7. Some weapons were removed from forts with the intent of getting US-made artillery into the fight. 8-inch, 10-inch, and 12-inch guns and 12-inch mortars were converted to railway artillery, while 5-inch and 6-inch guns became field guns on wheeled carriages. 12-inch mortars were also removed to improve reload times by reducing the number of mortars in a pit from four to two; this happened at Fort Hamilton to provide mortars elsewhere. Few US Army railway artillery pieces were mounted and few or none saw action before the Armistice; however, a railway artillery force was built up prior to the Treaty of Versailles in mid-1919 and remained in service or in reserve through early World War II. The remounted 5-inch and 6-inch guns were sent to France, but their units did not complete training in time to see action. By this time, pedestal mounts for 6-inch guns were known to be superior to disappearing mounts, being able to more rapidly track targets with a faster rate of fire. Thus, most disappearing guns (except the M1897, shorter than the others) were dismounted for use as field guns, while most of the few pedestal guns dismounted were returned to the forts soon after the war. The removed 6-inch disappearing guns (primarily M1903 and M1905) were stored and many returned to service in World War II.

Weapons removed from the New York City forts for potential service overseas were as follows: all of Fort Slocum's weapons, Fort Schuyler's pair of 5-inch guns, Fort Totten's pairs of 12-inch, 10-inch, 8-inch, and 5-inch guns (the 10-inch guns went to Fort Hamilton), three 10-inch guns and 8 6-inch guns at Fort Hamilton, two 10-inch guns at Fort Wadsworth, and only one 5-inch gun at Fort Hancock. At Fort Totten, only eight mortars and six 3-inch guns remained.

In 1917 one mortar from each pit of the mortar battery at Fort Hancock on Sandy Hook was removed to create a battery at the new Highlands Military Reservation (a.k.a. Navesink Military Reservation), in Navesink, NJ near the base of Sandy Hook. Four mortars were removed at Fort Hamilton to create a battery at Camp Rockaway Beach, later Fort Tilden, in Far Rockaway, Queens. Two pairs of 6-inch guns on pedestal mounts were also relocated there, from Fort Slocum and Fort Hamilton.

Also in 1917, construction began at Fort Hancock on two batteries of a new type: 12-inch guns on long-range barbette carriages. There were two guns per battery, initially without cover but positioned where they were difficult to see from the ocean. Each battery had a large earth-covered concrete bunker for ammunition and fire control. These batteries were completed in 1921. The long-range carriage was developed in response to the rapid improvement of dreadnought battleships in the naval arms race.

References indicate that the authorized strength of CD Eastern New York in World War I was 13 companies, that of CD Southern New York was 45 companies, including 13 from the New York National Guard (NYNG), and CD Sandy Hook was 24 companies, including 12 NYNG.

=== Interwar ===
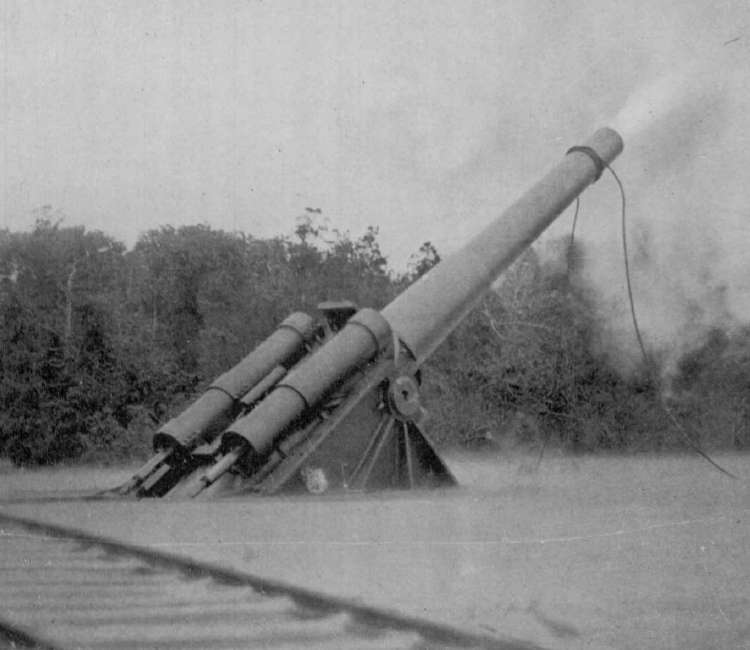
12-inch gun M1895 on M1917 long-range barbette carriage, similar to the first emplacements of this type at Fort Hancock.

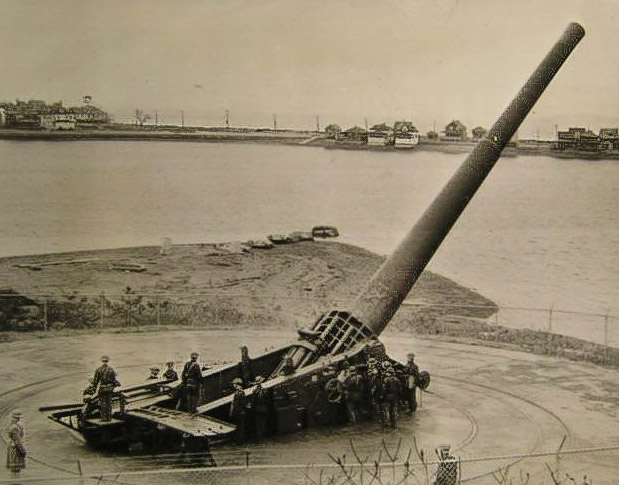
16-inch gun M1919, similar to the first emplacements at Fort Tilden.

In 1919 the Sandy Hook Proving Ground was disestablished and its functions transferred to Aberdeen Proving Ground. The mortars at Camp Rockaway Beach were replaced with railway mortars, as the fixed mortars were very near Naval Air Station Rockaway and could cause damage there when fired. In 1920 the mortars at Highlands Military Reservation were removed, and the mortars in Rockaway were withdrawn in 1921, although the 6-inch guns remained. Circa 1920–1923 the mortar batteries at Fort Hancock were disarmed, but the mortar battery later became a harbor defense command post.

During and after World War I two- or three-gun antiaircraft batteries armed with M1917 3-inch (76 mm) guns on fixed mounts were built at some forts. Some of these weapons remained in service through early World War II; others were replaced by towed 3-inch guns in the 1930s.

During World War I, in response to rapid improvements in dreadnought battleships, the Coast Artillery developed a new weapon, the 16-inch gun M1919 (406 mm). The first of these was deployed at Fort Michie in the Coast Defenses of Long Island Sound, on an improved disappearing carriage with elevation increased from 15° to 30°. However, shortly after developing this carriage, the Coast Artillery's experience in delivering plunging fire with howitzers on the Western Front (especially the French-made French-made 400 mm (15.75 inch) Modèle 1916 railway howitzer) was used to develop a new barbette carriage with a 65° elevation, thus maximizing the guns' range and exploiting weak deck armor on potential target ships. All subsequent US 16-inch gun installations used the high-angle carriage, and no further disappearing emplacements of any kind were built for the Coast Artillery. HD Southern New York received two (of seven total) of these weapons, at Fort Tilden in Far Rockaway, Queens. The new battery was built 1921–1923. Like the long-range 12-inch weapons, these were initially in open mounts.

In 1919–1920 several weapon types were declared obsolete and removed from coast defenses. These included all 5-inch guns, all Armstrong guns (6-inch and 4.72-inch), and 3-inch M1898 guns. Only in rare cases were these weapons replaced.

On 1 July 1924 the harbor defense garrisons completed the transition from a company-based organization to a regimental one, and on 9 June 1925 the commands were renamed from "Coast Defenses..." to "Harbor Defenses..." as Harbor Defense Commands. The 5th Coast Artillery regiment was the Regular Army component of HD Southern New York from 30 June 1924 through 24 February 1944. The 7th Coast Artillery regiment was the Regular Army component of HD Sandy Hook from 30 June 1924 through 24 February 1944. The 244th Coast Artillery regiment (tractor-drawn) (155 mm gun) was a New York National Guard component of HD Southern New York and HD Sandy Hook until shortly after mobilization on 16 September 1940. The regiment then moved to HD Chesapeake Bay, and none of its components returned to HD New York for the duration of hostilities. The 245th Coast Artillery regiment was the primary New York National Guard component of HD New York from 1 January 1924 through 7 October 1944. The 52nd Coast Artillery regiment, initially with 8-inch M1888 railway guns, was stationed at Fort Hancock in 1940 and sent detachments to Bermuda and Newfoundland in early 1941, with most of the regiment transferred elsewhere in 1941–42. In early 1942 the remaining railway artillery units at Fort Hancock were rearmed with ex-Navy 8-inch Mk. VI railway guns, two batteries of which were transferred to Fort Miles, Delaware in March and September 1942. Most of the remainder of the regiment was transferred to Fort John Custis, Virginia by 1 May 1943, when it was broken up into battalions. One battery remained at Fort Hancock until March 1944, when it was deactivated.

On 10 July 1926 lightning sparked a catastrophic series of explosions at the Lake Denmark Naval Ammunition Depot (now Picatinny Arsenal in Rockaway Township, New Jersey). This led to a greater concern for ammunition safety.

In 1935 the Harbor Defenses of Eastern New York effectively completed disarmament; however, the command was not inactivated until 1942. Fort Schuyler became the State University of New York Maritime College, Fort Slocum had already been disarmed, and Fort Totten was disarmed except for four 3-inch guns, which remained through World War II. It is possible that the minefield capability also remained through World War II. Fort Slocum and Fort Totten remained as administrative and training posts, especially for air defense systems post-World War II. Fort Slocum was closed in 1965, and Fort Totten followed in 1974, although the latter remains an Army reserve center.

=== World War II ===
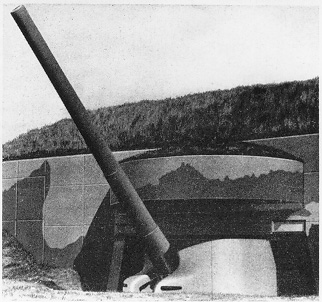
16-inch casemated gun, similar to those at Fort Tilden and the Highlands Military Reservation.

Early in World War II numerous temporary buildings were again constructed at the forts to accommodate the rapid mobilization of men and equipment.

After the Fall of France in 1940 the Army decided to replace all existing heavy coast defense guns, except the long-range 12-inch guns, with 16-inch guns. In the New York area, one of the few with a pre-war 16-inch installation, this meant one additional two-gun battery at the Highlands Military Reservation. This was Battery 116, built in 1942–43 with two ex-Navy 16-inch Mark 2 guns. This battery, along with the 16-inch battery at Fort Tilden and the long-range 12-inch batteries at Fort Hancock, superseded all other heavy weapons in the New York City area. All of these batteries were casemated during the war with heavy concrete enclosures for protection against air attack. Two additional 16-inch batteries, Battery 115 at Fort Wadsworth and Battery 117 near what is now JFK Airport, were proposed but not built.

The 16-inch batteries were supplemented by new two-gun 6-inch (152 mm) batteries. These included heavy earth-covered concrete bunkers for ammunition and fire control, with the guns protected by open-back shields. The guns for these batteries were mostly the 6-inch guns removed in World War I for field service and stored since that war; a new 6-inch gun M1 of similar characteristics was developed when this supply of guns began to run out. Three of these batteries were built in the New York area, Battery 220 at Fort Tilden, Battery 218 at Fort Wadsworth, and Battery 219 at the Highlands Military Reservation. However, only Battery 219 was armed.

Six 90 mm gun (3.5 inch) Anti-Motor Torpedo Boat (AMTB) batteries were built in the New York City area. These had 90 mm dual-purpose (anti-surface and anti-aircraft) guns. Each battery was authorized two 90 mm guns on fixed mounts, two on towed mounts, and two single 40 mm Bofors guns, although the weapons on hand may have varied. AMTB 7 and 8 were at Fort Hancock, with AMTB 21 at Rockaway Point (along with two relocated 3-inch guns), AMTB 19 at Norton Point (along with four 3-inch guns), AMTB 12 at Swinburne Island, and a battery of unknown designation at Miller Field.

As the new defenses were built, in 1942–43 the vast majority of the older guns were scrapped. However, the 6-inch pedestal guns and some of the 3-inch guns were retained in service through the end of the war, with some relocations.

Following mobilization in 1940 the HD New York commands were subordinate to First Army, with headquarters at Fort Jay. On 24 December 1941 the Eastern Theater of Operations (renamed the Eastern Defense Command three months later) was established, with all east coast harbor defense commands subordinate to it, along with antiaircraft and fighter assets. Its headquarters was also at Fort Jay. This command was disestablished in 1946. On 4 May 1942 the Harbor Defenses of Long Island Sound were inactivated and consolidated with the Harbor Defenses of New York. On 9 May 1942 HD Southern New York merged with HD Sandy Hook and a remnant of HD Eastern New York into the Harbor Defenses of New York. HD Southern New York, HD Eastern New York, and HD Long Island Sound were disbanded on 22 May 1944.

The 265th Coast Artillery Regiment (HD) of the Florida National Guard was stationed at Fort Hancock and operated defenses there from February through June 1943, then was transferred to Alaska.

The US Navy also participated in defending the New York area with net defenses and submarine-detecting indicator loops, including stations at Fort Tilden and Fort Hancock, with an administrative HQ at Fort Wadsworth.

The removal of most weapons and an Army-wide shift from a regimental to a battalion-based system meant more organizational changes in New York's defenses. On 24 February 1944 the 5th and 7th Coast Artillery regiments were effectively disestablished, and on 7 October 1944 the 245th Coast Artillery was redesignated as the 192nd and 245th Coast Artillery Battalions, which themselves were disestablished on 1 April 1945. Personnel from these units were absorbed by HD New York.

=== Post World War II ===
Following the war, it was soon determined that gun defenses were obsolete, and they were scrapped by the end of 1948, with remaining harbor defense functions turned over to the Navy. In 1950 the Coast Artillery Corps and all Army harbor defense commands were dissolved. Today the Air Defense Artillery carries the lineage of some Coast Artillery units. An extensive system of 90 mm and 120 mm antiaircraft guns was emplaced in Greater New York in the late 1940s, followed by Nike missile systems in the 1950s; both of these systems reused many of the coast defense sites. The Nike missiles were removed in the early 1970s.

== Present ==
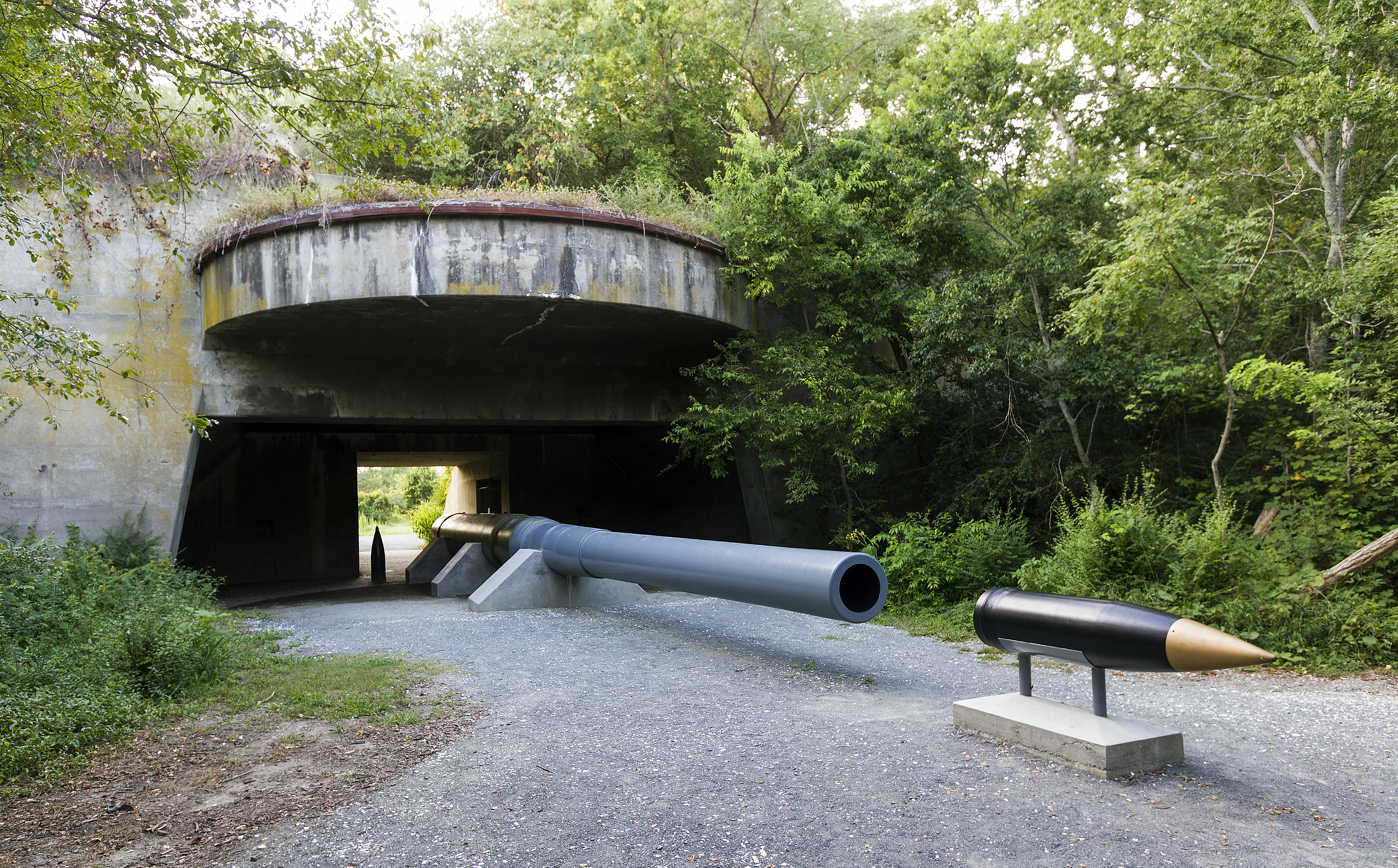
16-inch Mark 7 gun displayed at Fort John Custis, Virginia, similar to the display at Hartshorne Woods Park, the former Highlands Military Reservation.

Fort Wadsworth, Fort Tilden, and Fort Hancock are parts of the Gateway National Recreation Area, managed by the National Park Service and open to the public. Fort Jay and Castle Williams are in Governors Island National Monument, also a national park; they are also open to the public with a collection of Civil War-era cannon and good interpretive signage. The third system fort at Fort Schuyler has been fully converted to office space as part of the State University of New York Maritime College. The old fort is well-preserved, but the Endicott batteries are all demolished or buried. A magazine for the 12-inch battery and a mostly-buried mine casemate remain. Fort Slocum has been mostly demolished; however, a 15-inch Rodman gun remains on the island, along with three of the four mortar pits an 1890s practice battery. Fort Totten is partly used as an Army Reserve center; the stone fort is open to the public but the preserved Endicott batteries are not. The minefield control area is largely intact, but is in use by the New York Police Department. The former Fort Totten Officers' Club, one of many buildings in the United States resembling the Army Corps of Engineers' castle symbol, is now home to the Bayside Historical Society.

Fort Wood remains as the foundation of the Statue of Liberty; Fort Gibson on Ellis Island was demolished in 1892 to make room for the immigration station, and a plaque on the island commemorates it. Castle Clinton remains intact and is used for concerts. Fort Gansevoort was demolished in 1854; the North Battery also no longer exists. Fort Lafayette was demolished in 1960 to make room for the Verrazzano–Narrows Bridge.

Fort Hamilton is the last active Army post in New York City; a number of weapons are displayed at or near the fort, although none of the Endicott batteries remain. These include an experimental 20-inch Rodman gun, the largest US-made weapon of the Civil War era, in John Paul Jones Park just north of the fort (with many projectiles for it at the fort), 10-inch Rodman converted rifles on the fort property, and an ex-Navy 12"/45 caliber Mark V Mod 8 gun, generally similar to the biggest guns at the fort in the Endicott era. Only about a third of the old fort remains intact; however, the fort's remaining caponier houses the Army's Harbor Defense Museum.

Most of the Endicott batteries at Fort Wadsworth have been buried. Paradoxically, much of Battery Duane, the 8-inch battery abandoned in 1915, remains intact near Fort Tompkins. The third system forts Battery Weed and Fort Tompkins are also intact. Battery Weed and Fort Tompkins are only accessible on a ranger-led tour. Battery Dix, Battery Barry, and many of the 1870s emplacements remain unburied but are deteriorating.

Fort Tilden's 16-inch battery can be viewed but not entered. The former Nike Site NY-49 is in use by the park service and not open to the public.

Fort Hancock has one of the largest collections of preserved Endicott and World War II batteries anywhere, including various experimental batteries at the former proving ground. Significant remains include the prototype gun-lift emplacements of Battery Potter, the dynamite gun battery, and the test battery for the 14-inch gun turrets of Fort Drum in Manila Bay, Philippines. Many of the garrison buildings survive, and there are a 20-inch Rodman and a 10-inch Rodman on site. Also rare are the pair of remounted 6-inch M1900 guns at Battery New Peck a.k.a. Battery Gunnison. Only a small part of one wall of the third system fort, with four embrasures, remains. Nike Site NY-56 is partially preserved, with a radar area and some display missiles. The Highlands Military Reservation is now Hartshorne Woods Park, and a Navy 16"/50 caliber Mark 7 gun has been placed on display at one of the 16-inch casemates.

== Coats of arms ==
=== Harbor Defenses of Eastern New York ===
- Blazon
  - Shield: Ermine on a chevron vert a mine case between two Engineer castles argent.
  - Crest: On a wreath of the colors a dexter arm in armor, embowed proper charged with a mullet gules grasping in the naked hand a sword argent hilted or.
  - Motto: The motto Sic Vis Pacem, Para Bellum (If you want peace, prepare for war).
- Symbolism: Fort Totten was originally the site of the Engineer School of Application, later the Coast Artillery School of Submarine Defense. The Chevron in green, the school color, with its charges, shows its history. It is now the seat of the Artillery District shown by the crest, the star indicating a general officer, the arm with sword the power of command.

=== Harbor Defenses of Southern New York ===
- Blazon
  - Shield: Vair, three bars gules, jessant from the middle one a demilion saliant, ragardant or.
  - Crest: On a wreath of the colors (argent and azure) a beaver couchant proper.
  - Motto: The motto Volens et Potens (Willing and Able).
- Symbolism: The crest is the beaver of New York, the only charge on the original arms of New Netherland adopted in 1623, and now on the seal of New York City. The shield symbolizes the battle of Long Island, August 27, 1776, which took place near the present Fort Hamilton. The color of the field is vair, a fur, which is said to come from an animal called Varus, the back of which is blue, the belly white. Tradition relates that a Hungarian general displayed his cloak made of varus fur as an ensign to rally his men and succeeded in turning defeat into victory. Similarly Washington, after the battle of Long Island, by a masterly retreat across the East River, rendered the British victory fruitless. The three bars represent the three enemy forces under Grant and Cornwallis and the British fleet. The lion in a springing position issuing from the center bar symbolizes the piercing of Cornwallis' command by the American brigade under General Stirling.

=== Coast Defenses of Sandy Hook ===
- Blazon
  - Shield: The shield is artillery red on the upper half and gold below, the line between the two being embattled. On the red and rising out of the embattlements is the Statue of Liberty in gold, and in the lower half is the Sandy Hook lighthouse placed between two bursting shells. The lighthouse and shells are black, while the flames from the shells are the natural color of fire.
  - Crest: The crest is a gold panther, breathing fire, placed on the battlements of a red tower.
  - Motto: The motto is Obscurata Lucidior (Dimmed yet Brighter), and refers to the incident when the darkening of the lighthouse furthered the light of liberty in the country.
  - A supporter for these arms to be used in all cases except for the colors. When Hudson explored New York Bay and the river which bears his name in 1609, his ship Half Moon was anchored in the Horse-shoe near Sandy Hook, in commemoration of which the shield of these defenses is displayed in front of the Half Moon.
- Background: The coat of arms was initially approved in 1919 for the Coast Defenses of Sandy Hook. In 1924 the gold panther crest was adopted by the 7th Coast Artillery Regiment.

== See also ==
- Seacoast defense in the United States
- Harbor Defense Command
- List of coastal fortifications of the United States

== Bibliography ==
- Abbatt, William (1901). The Battle of Pell's Point. New York: William Abbatt. "Battle of Pell's Point."
- Berhow, Mark A., ed. (2015). American Seacoast Defenses, A Reference Guide (Third ed.). McLean, Virginia: CDSG Press. ISBN 978-0-9748167-3-9.
- Coats of Arms and Badges of the Coast Artillery Corps, Coast Artillery Journal, August 1923, vol. 59 no. 2, pp. 123-142
- Conn, Stetson; Engelman, Rose C.; Fairchild, Byron (2000) [1964]. Guarding the United States and its Outposts. United States Army in World War II. Washington, D.C.: Center of Military History, United States Army. Archived from the original on 2007-12-25.
- Duchesneau, John T.; Troost-Cramer, Kathleen (2014). Fort Adams: A History. The History Press. ISBN 9781625850584.
- Fowler, William M. (2005). Empires at War: The French and Indian War and the Struggle for North America, 1754-1763. New York: Walker. ISBN 0-8027-1411-0.
- Gaines, William C., Coast Artillery Organizational History, 1917-1950, Coast Defense Journal, vol. 23, issue 2, pp. 6–8, 25–27
- Hainsworth, David Roger; Churches, Christing (1998). The Anglo-Dutch Naval Wars 1652–1674. Sutton Publications Limited.
- Higginbotham, Don (1983). The War of American Independence. Northeastern Classics. ISBN 978-0-9303504-4-4.
- Jackson, Kenneth T.; Dunbar, David S. (2005). Empire City: New York Through the Centuries. Columbia University Press. ISBN 978-0-231-10909-3.
- Ketchum, Richard M (1973). The Winter Soldiers. Garden City, NY: Doubleday. ISBN 0-385-05490-4. OCLC 640266.
- Ketchum, Richard M (1997). Saratoga: Turning Point of America's Revolutionary War. New York: Henry Holt. ISBN 978-0-8050-6123-9. OCLC 41397623.
- McCullough, David (2006). 1776. New York: Simon and Schuster Paperback. ISBN 0-7432-2672-0. "1776 David."
- Miller, H. W., LTC, USA (1921). Railway Artillery, Vols. I and II. Washington: US Government Printing Office.
- Miller, John C. (1943), Origins of the American Revolution, Boston: Little, Brown and Company, archived from the original on 2009-10-23 – via Questia
- Nickerson, Hoffman (1967) [1928]. The Turning Point of the Revolution. Port Washington, NY: Kennikat. OCLC 549809.
- Ordnance Corps, US Army (1922). American Coast Artillery Materiel. Washington: Government Printing Office.
- Riker, James (1883). Evacuation Day, 1783; Its many stirring events; with recollections of Capt. John Van Arsdale of the Veteran Corps of Artillery, by whose efforts on that day the enemy were circumvented and the American flag successfully raised on the Battery. New York: Published by the author.
- Rinaldi, Richard A. (2004). The U. S. Army in World War I: Orders of Battle. General Data LLC. ISBN 0-9720296-4-8.
- Roberts, Robert B. (1988). Encyclopedia of Historic Forts: The Military, Pioneer, and Trading Posts of the United States. New York: Macmillan. ISBN 0-02-926880-X.
- Schecter, Barnet (2002). The Battle for New York. New York: Walker. ISBN 0-8027-1374-2.
- Smith, Edmund Banks (1913), Governors Island: Its Military History Under Three Flags, 1637–1913 (1st ed.), New York: Edmund Banks Smith, p. 178
- Stanton, Shelby L. (1991). World War II Order of Battle. Galahad Books. ISBN 0-88365-775-9.
- Van Rensselaer, Mary Griswold Schuyler (1909). History of the City of New York in the Seventeenth Century: New Amsterdam. New York: Macmillan. OCLC 938239.
- Wade, Arthur P. (2011). Artillerists and Engineers: The Beginnings of American Seacoast Fortifications, 1794–1815. CDSG Press. ISBN 978-0-9748167-2-2.
- Weaver II, John R. (2018). A Legacy in Brick and Stone: American Coastal Defense Forts of the Third System, 1816-1867, 2nd Ed. McLean, VA: Redoubt Press. ISBN 978-1-7323916-1-1.
- Williford, Glen (2016). American Breechloading Mobile Artillery, 1875-1953. Atglen, PA: Schiffer Publishing, Ltd. ISBN 978-0-7643-5049-8.
