= 245th Coast Artillery =

245th Coast Artillery Regiment
- Active: 1924 – 1944
- Country: United States
- Branch: Army
- Type: Coast artillery
- Role: Harbor defense
- Size: Regiment
- Part of: Harbor Defenses of Southern New York; Harbor Defenses of Sandy Hook; Harbor Defenses of New York
- Garrison/HQ: Fort Hancock
- Motto: "Pro Patria Armamus" - Bearing arms for our country
- Mascot: Oozlefinch

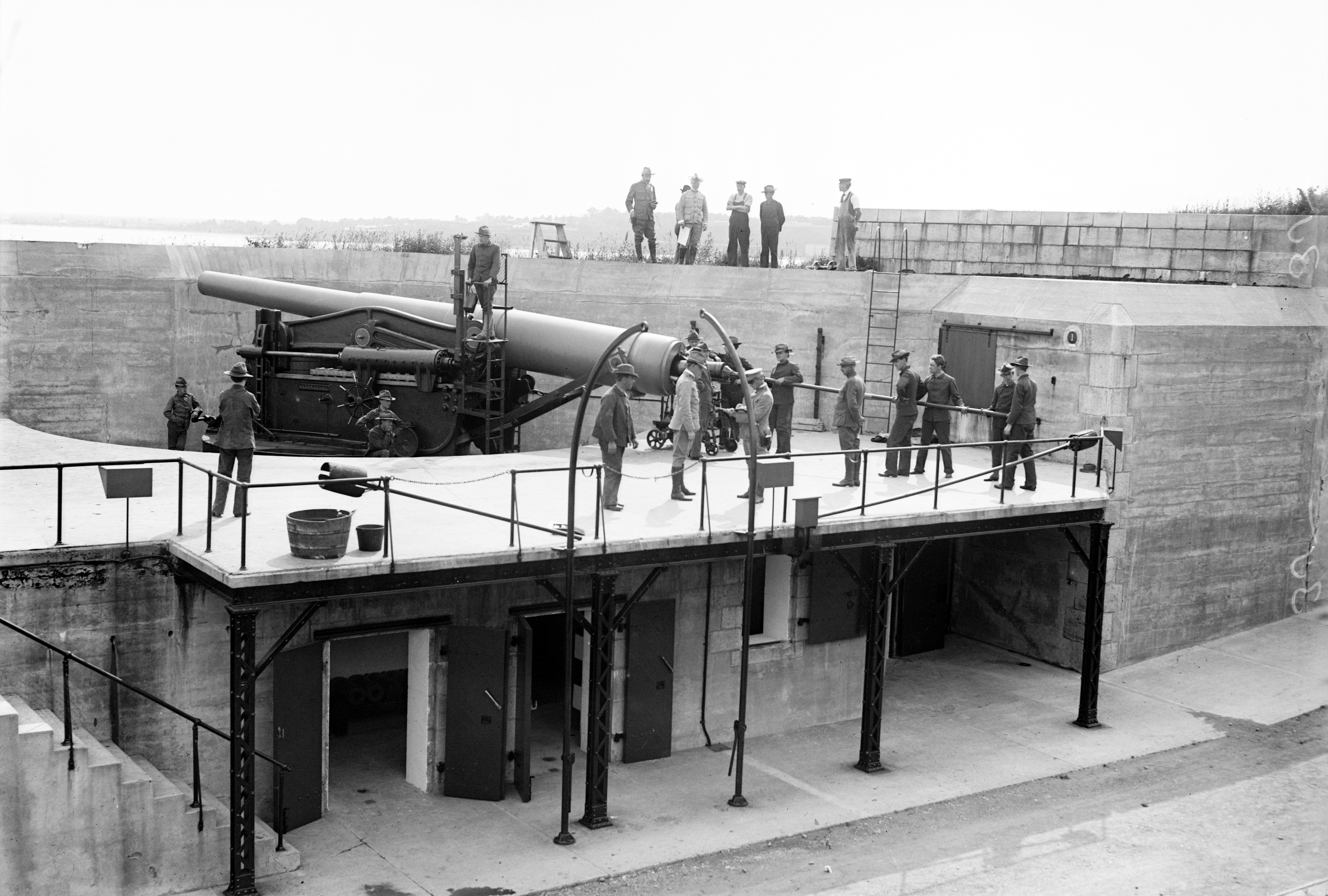
In June 1908, the 10th Company of the 13th Artillery District, NYNG (later the 245th Coast Artillery) loads a 10-inch gun at Fort Hamilton

The 245th Coast Artillery Regiment was a Coast Artillery Corps regiment in the New York National Guard. It garrisoned the Harbor Defenses of New York (HD New York), New York and predecessor commands 1924–1944.

== History ==
The regiment's lineage traces back to the Kings County Militia of the Revolutionary War. This became the 13th New York State Militia in 1847, nicknamed the "13th Brooklyn". Subsequent units served in the Civil War as the 87th New York Volunteer Infantry Regiment and the Spanish–American War as the 22nd New York Volunteer Infantry Regiment. Redesignated 13th Heavy Artillery Regiment 8 February 1900. Redesignated 13th Coast Artillery Corps, NY NG 1 September 1906. Redesignated 13th Artillery District 23 January 1908. Redesignated 13th Coast Defense Command, NY NG CAC 10 August 1914. Mustered into federal service 16 July 1917 and assigned to the Coast Defenses of Southern New York. Six of twelve companies transferred to the 59th Artillery, Coast Artillery Corps, served in France, returned to the US and mustered out in early 1919. Mustered out 7 December 1918. Reorganized as 13th CDC, NY NG 17 August 1919; redesignated 245th Artillery, CAC NY NG 1 January 1924.

The 245th Coast Artillery was organized 14 May 1924 as a New York National Guard component of the Harbor Defenses of Southern New York (HD Southern New York), New York, initially along with the 244th Coast Artillery. Including predecessor organizations such as the 13th Coast Defense Command, the regiment's armory from 1894 through possibly 1944 was at 357 Sumner Ave. (now Marcus Garvey Blvd.) in Brooklyn, New York. The 5th Coast Artillery and 7th Coast Artillery were the Regular Army components of those defenses. In October 1944 the 245th was broken up into two battalions as part of an Army-wide reorganization.

== Lineage ==
Organized 14 May 1924 by redesignating the 245th Artillery, Coast Artillery Corps, New York National Guard.

Inducted into federal service 16 September 1940 at Brooklyn, New York and moved to Fort Hancock in HD Sandy Hook 24 September 1940. Transferred to Bendix, New Jersey 31 October 1941 and returned to Fort Hancock 6 November 1941.

At some time in 1942 HD Sandy Hook and HD Southern New York merged as HD New York.

On 23 September 1942 the 1st Battalion, 7th Coast Artillery transferred, less personnel and equipment, to Fort Tilden, New York to join the 2nd Battalion there. Personnel of the 1st Battalion were reassigned to the 3rd Battalion, 245th Coast Artillery Regiment, and vice versa. This placed the 7th Coast Artillery at Fort Tilden and the 245th Coast Artillery at Fort Hancock.

The regiment (or possibly just the headquarters) moved to Fort Wadsworth 20 May 1943, and to Fort Hancock 1 March 1944.

On 24 February 1944 the 5th and 7th Coast Artillery Regiments were withdrawn from HD New York and soon inactivated, with most of their assets transferred to that command.

On 7 October 1944 the regiment was broken up into the 192nd and 245th Coast Artillery Battalions at Fort Hancock, which were deactivated there 1 April 1945 with their assets transferred to HD New York.

== See also ==
- Seacoast defense in the United States
- United States Army Coast Artillery Corps
- Harbor Defense Command
