= Veteran Corps of Artillery =

Honor guard of the Military Society of the War of 1812

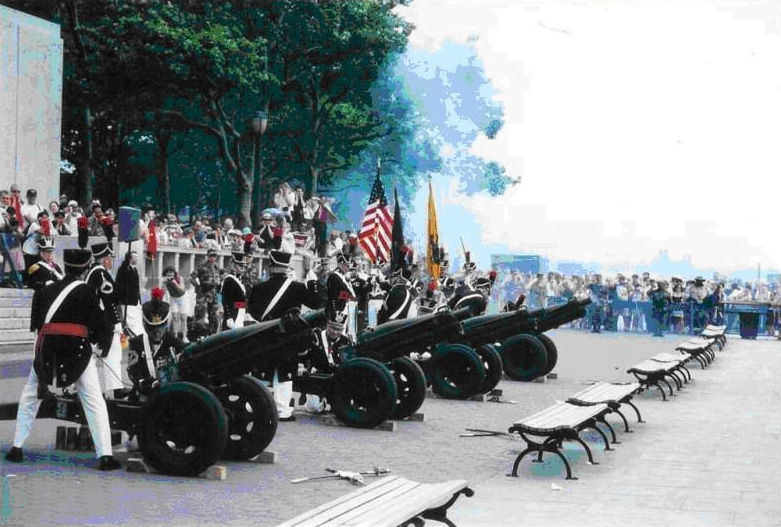
- The Salute Battery in War of 1812 era parade dress
- Active: 1790–present day
- Country: United States
- Allegiance: New York
- Type: Artillery
- Role: Ceremonial Field Artillery, Color Guard and Field Music Regiment
- Size: Regiment
- Headquarters: Fort Hamilton; Brooklyn, New York
- Anniversaries: Evacuation Day
- Arms: 75 mm pack howitzers
- Engagements: War of 1812; Dead Rabbits Riot; American Civil War; New York Draft Riots; World War I
- Website: vcasny.org

Commanders
- Current commander: Col. J. Raymond Mechmann
- Notable commanders: Rev. Morgan Dix; Brevet Maj. Asa B. Gardiner

The Veteran Corps of Artillery (VCA or VCASNY) is an active federally-and state-recognized military command established as an independent artillery unit in 1790 at New York by veterans of the Continental Corps of Artillery. It is the oldest military unit in New York State and one of the oldest in the United States. In 1848, it consolidated with the Military Society of the War of 1812 (formed in 1826 by American veterans of the War of 1812).

The Veteran Corps of Artillery was mustered into federal service for three months in September 1814 and attached to the 3d New York Artillery Regiment. During World War I, the corps offered its services as a home guard to the governor of New York.

The Militia Acts of 1792, 1903 and 1908, Revised US Statutes in the 1870s, National Defense Acts of 1916 and 1956, the Volunteer Act of 1914, 10 US Code 311, three separate New York State statutes, and a Supreme Court decision (Maryland for the Use of Levin) combine to impart both federal and state status to the VCASNY. It is considered a Reserve unit of the United States Army, although it may be called to active duty as part of the US Army, Army National Guard or New York State Guard depending on the circumstances of its activation.

== Membership ==
In 1917, the Veteran Corps of Artillery regulations for membership were amended. Today, in order to apply for the Corps, prospective members must be a U.S. citizen and be 18 years of age or older. Additionally, while prior military service is not a condition for membership, those with prior or active service enter as privates regardless of previous or current rank. In spite of the name, the corps is not a veterans' organization like The American Legion or the Veterans of Foreign Wars of the U.S.

== Background ==
At the time of the American Revolution, the British Colonies in North America did not have a regular standing army. Instead the colonies depended on an independent militia made up mostly of civilian farmers, with few weapons and controlled by the individual colony. While the Continental Congress established a regular army in June 1775, this was more of a formality rather than a reality. In 1776 George Washington wrote "I am wearied to death all day with a variety of perplexing circumstances, disturbed at the conduct of the militia, whose behavior and want of discipline has done great injury to the other troops, who never had officers, except in a few instances, worth the bread they eat" In other words, while the success of the militia itself is debatable, both the regular army and local militia were used to win American Independence.

The official end to the American Revolutionary War did not occur until 1783 when the Treaty of Paris was signed. Until then, British troops, ships and Tories were present and active in New York City, and in fact, Britain would maintain a presence in the United States until 1815 when the War of 1812 ended.

... Nationalists, most of them war veterans, worried that the new nation was too fragile to withstand an international war, or even internal revolts such as the Shays' Rebellion of 1786 in Massachusetts. (see American Revolution)

== History ==
=== Formation ===
Logo in 1901

The Veteran Corps of Artillery is the oldest military organization in New York State. It was formed in Manhattan on Evacuation Day (New York), November 25, 1790 , by Veterans of Washington's Continental Army Corps of Artillery. The founders met at the City Arms Tavern located off Broadway near Trinity Church, to establish an independent artillery company of exempts in the event of a return invasion by the British. Exempts were males beyond serving military age and thereby exempt from regular militia service. They are currently headquartered at Manhattan's 7th Regiment Armory in the City of New York. Under federal law, they are part of the Organized Militia of the State of New York, and under state law it is an Independent Military Organization and an Historic Military Command. Private, Federal and State records indicate that there has been, and may still be a lot of debate on this question even since the early days of the corps. Some government authorities, have considered them an Organized Militia, while others still refer to them as an unorganized militia. In either case, it seems that regardless of their legal definition, the corps has enjoyed fruitful relations with the United States Army, the New York Guard, New York Division of Military and Naval Affairs, and others. This appears to be especially true during the timeframe of World War I, when the corps volunteered for several missions, and received federal, and state backing. In the foreword to The Minute Men of '17, Colonel George W. Burleigh of the NY Guard thanks Major General Leonard Wood United States Army "... for his foresight in giving encouragement and approval to the whole plan. His successor commanding the Department of the East, Major General J. Franklin Bell, continued this support for the Corps ..."

=== 19th century ===
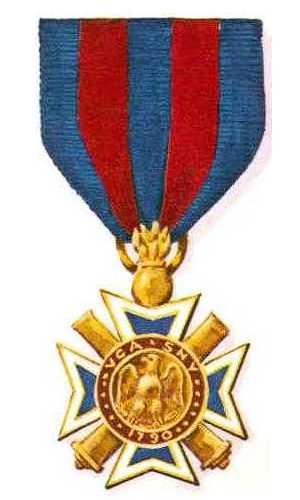
Ceremonial badge of the corps

When the Veteran Corps of Artillery was formed, it consisted exclusively of officers and soldiers of the American Revolutionary War. Few historical records exist to document their activities for the periods between their formation and just prior to the beginning of the War of 1812. It is known however, that the active part of the corps was the Artillery Service Detachment. This section was uniformed and it participated in drills. When hostilities with Britain became imminent, they became the first independent military organization in New York State to volunteer their services for the field. At this time they entered service on June 25, 1812, until July 2, 1812, and then again from September 2, 1814, until March 2, 1815.

In 1814, and then again in 1890, the Veteran Corps of Artillery amended their regulations to include descendants of both the American Revolutionary War and the War of 1812. This was most likely due to their decreasing numbers and the advanced age of its members.

The Military Society of the War of 1812 was formed 03 January 1826 by officers of the War of 1812 to press for pensions and bounty land legislation. The Military Society of the War of 1812 and the Veteran Corps of Artillery of the State of New York on 08 January 1848 merged as a sole organization. Since that time there has been a changing role between the two organizations. At present the Veteran Corps of Artillery of the State of New York operates under the leadership of the Military Society of the War of 1812 .

=== 20th century ===
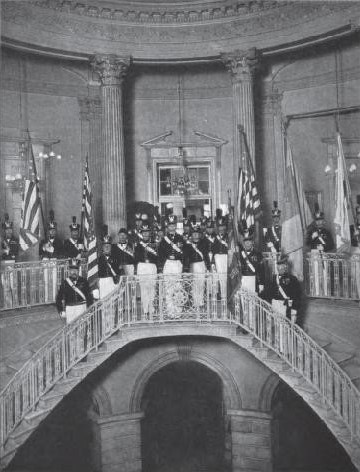
Acting as a guard of honor in 1917

Records indicate that the Veteran Corps of Artillery volunteered as an organization for federal service on various occasions in the early part of the 20th century. As in its origin, the corps at the time consisted of men that were exempt from military service due to age or some other reason; however, given the fact that the United States was at war, "The men of the Corps felt that not only their personal inclinations but the traditions of the organization demanded of them that they serve their country in some definite military capacity.". Tradition also demanded of course that they take up the defense of New York City.

==== Militia Act of 1903 ====
Present day United States Code Title 10, Section 311 states that:

- (a)The militia of the United States consists of all able-bodied males at least 17 years of age and, except as provided in section 313 of title 32, under 45 years of age who are, or who have made a declaration of intention to become, citizens of the United States and of female citizens of the United States who are members of the National Guard.
- (b) The classes of the militia are -
  - (1) the organized militia, which consists of the National Guard and the Naval Militia; and
  - (2) the unorganized militia, which consists of the members of the militia who are not members of the National Guard or the Naval Militia.

This definition is derived from the Militia Act of 1903 which was specifically passed by United States Congress to address the issues of the Militia Act of 1792, as well as the readiness of the existing state militia forces. On the face of it, it appears that the Veteran Corps of Artillery is part of the unorganized militia; however, The National Defense Act of 1916 clarifies this in Section 63:

... Any corps of Artillery, Cavalry, or Infantry existing in any of the States on the passage of the Act of May eighth, seventeen hundred and ninetytwo, which by the laws, customs, or usages of said States has been in continuous existence since the passage of said Act, under its provisions and under the provisions of section two hundred and thirty-two and sections sixteen hundred and twenty-five to sixteen hundred and sixty, both inclusive, of title sixteen of the Revised Statutes of eighteen hundred and seventy-three, and the Act of January twenty-first, nineteen hundred and three, relating to the militia, shall be allowed to retain its ancient privileges, subject, nevertheless, to all duties required by law Of militia: Provided, That said organizations may be a part of the National Guard and entitled to all the privileges of this Act, and shall conform in all respects to the organization, discipline, and training of the National Guard in time of war: Provided further, That for purposes of training and when on active duty in the service of the United States they may be assigned to higher units, as the President may direct, and shall be subject to the orders of officers under whom they shall be serving.

It would appear then that this is the federal precedence that makes the Veteran Corps of Artillery subject to being part of the National Guard in time of war; thus, The Veteran Corps of Artillery State of New York is comprehended under The National Defense Act Public No. 85, 64th Congress (H.R. 12766) as being one of the nine Historic Military Organizations, liable for duty under orders of the President in time of War.

==== World War I ====
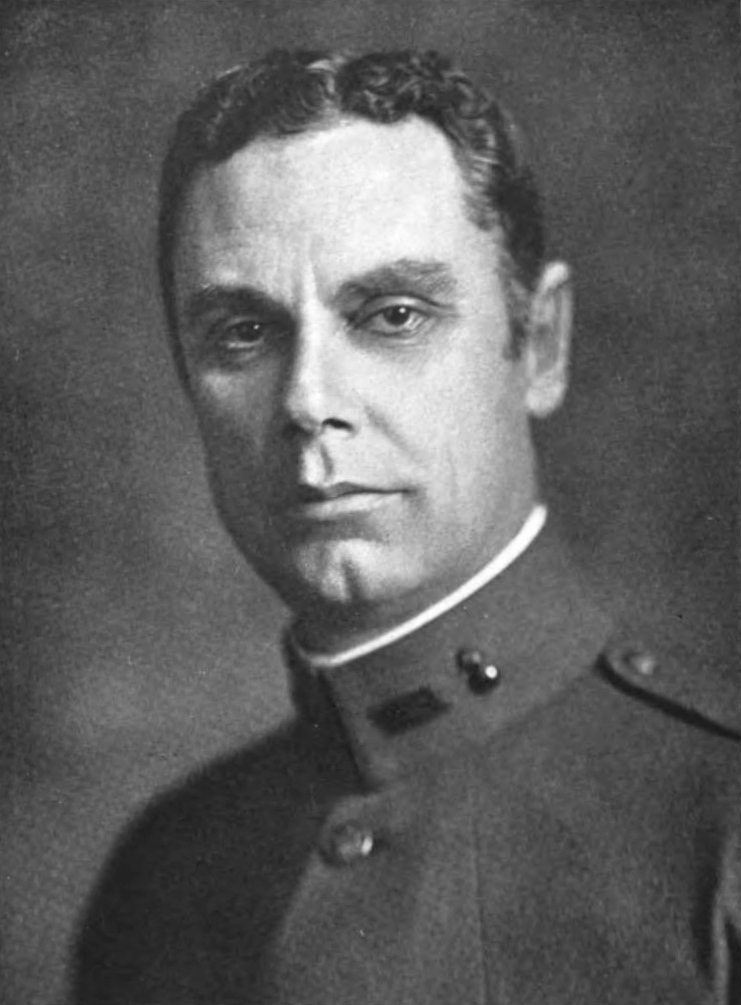
John Delafield

Two items of concern that would affect New York City directly were civil unrest, and submarine aircraft carriers. While the latter did not come into service in World War I, there was concern that, while these vessels could not inflict heavy damage, it would cost a morale issue in the United States. As such, the Veteran Corps of Artillery found a mission that they were suited for; however, they would first have to solve the issue of numbers in the ranks, while also not affecting the war effort. At first recruitment was from other hereditary organizations such as the Sons of the American Revolution, but they found that this would not greatly increase their ranks. So, on February 22, 1917, the regulations of the corps were once again amended to allow for the enlistment of exempts who were "... men of good moral character, not qualified for hereditary membership ...". Although there were some initial problems with the number of recruits the corps would eventually raise, they were eventually supported by New York state legislature and proceeded to form a total of twelve provisional batteries commanded by Colonel John Ross Delafield. Its first official public duty came in May 1917, when they were asked to participate as Honor Guard for the French and British Commission at City Hall. On October 8, 1917, the corps transferred into the 9th Coast Artillery Corps, New York Guard.

=== 21st century ===
With the attacks on the United States on 9/11, the Veteran Corps of Artillery volunteered to assist the 88th Brigade New York Guard. The role of the corps as an organization was minor, but some members assumed their roles in the military, law enforcement, emergency medical services, etc. and participated independently.

Members of the Veteran Corps of Artillery have served in several wars and military actions involving the United States including World War I, World War II, the Korean War, the Vietnam War, as well as Desert Storm and the present WOT conflicts in Iraq and Afghanistan. Members have served in all of the United States military branches, and many VCA members are still serving actively in either the regular branches or the National Guard or reserves including the NY (State) Guard. As noted in its web site, the current mission of the corps is to "preserve the military heritage of the State of New York and to support military activities in the State of New York upon request". The corps today serves primarily as a ceremonial unit, and during the course of its drill year, is invited to participate in numerous New York City parades, civic and patriotic events. Independently or in association with traditional veterans organizations, the corps also serves as honor guard and provides firing parties for military funerals, military anniversaries and other events of military interest. Drills and practice are held in several locations such as the 7th Regiment Armory, Jamaica Armory in Jamaica, Queens, and Camp Smith. Their drill season begins in October with the Columbus Day Parade, and ends with the corps "4th of July" salute to the nation. Here they render an artillery salute from its salute battery of 75 mm pack howitzers. This practice began on July 4, 1794, when the corps fired its first Federal Artillery Salute from the Battery in New York City in celebration of U.S. Independence. Other events that they participate in during the drill year include:

- Memorial Day
- Independence Day
- Columbus Day
- Veterans Day
- Saint Patrick's Day

In addition to this, there are also several social events for Veteran Corps of Artillery members and its sister organization, The Military Society of the War of 1812. These include the corps' annual mess which is held on the Saturday in January nearest to January 15, and The Military Society of 1812 Annual Dinner, held on the Saturday of January nearest to January 8 to celebrate the Battle of New Orleans.

Since the Veteran Corps of Artillery is subject to both federal and state call-up, and because it is legally required to "conform in all respects to the organization, discipline, and training of the National Guard in time of war", it conducts individual weapons qualifications each year at the Camp Smith New York National Guard Training Site in Peekskill, New York.

== Uniforms ==
The Veteran Corps of Artillery follows the United States Army regulations on uniforms. "Upon the Organization of the Corps in 1790, the uniform of the Continental Corps of Artillery of the Revolution was adopted"

- The Parade Dress uniform today is the U.S. Army uniform from the War of 1812. This uniform is worn during parades and patriotic events.
- The ACU (Army Combat Uniform) is typically worn during weapons training, parades, and exercises.
- U.S. Army Class A and Class B uniforms are worn during regular drills. As prescribed by AR 670–1, the VCA is transitioning to the new Army AGSU (Army Green Service Uniform).
- The Blue Corps Blazer with the Corps Blazer Patch-Gold Bullion and the Corps Tie is worn during informal social occasions.

== Commandants ==
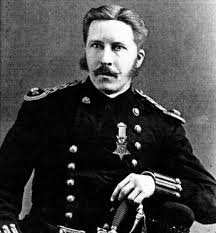
Asa Gardiner

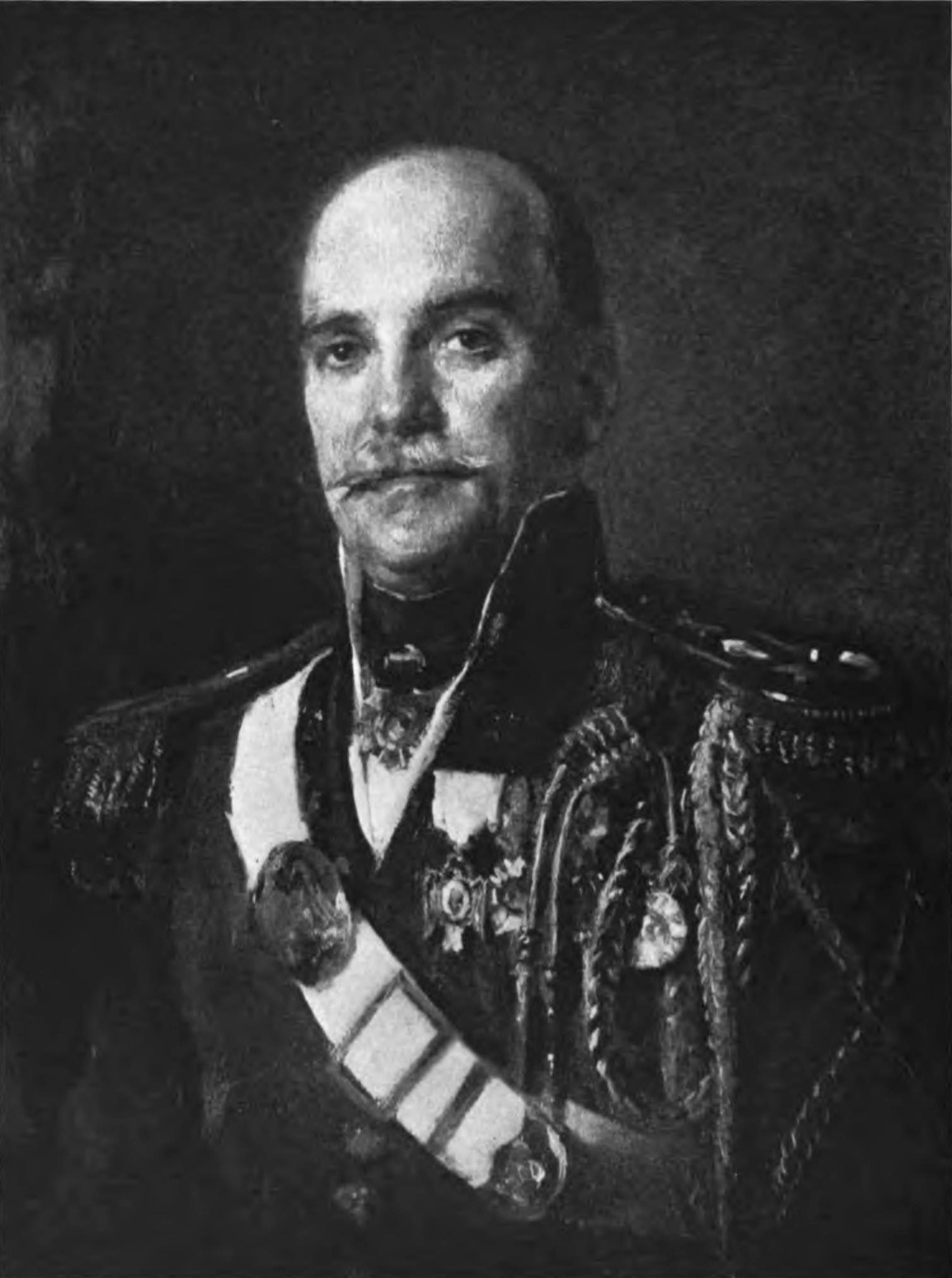
Charles Warren

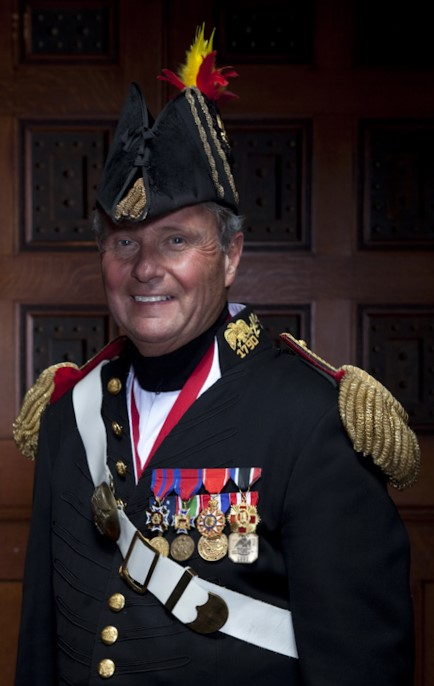
Charles Lucas

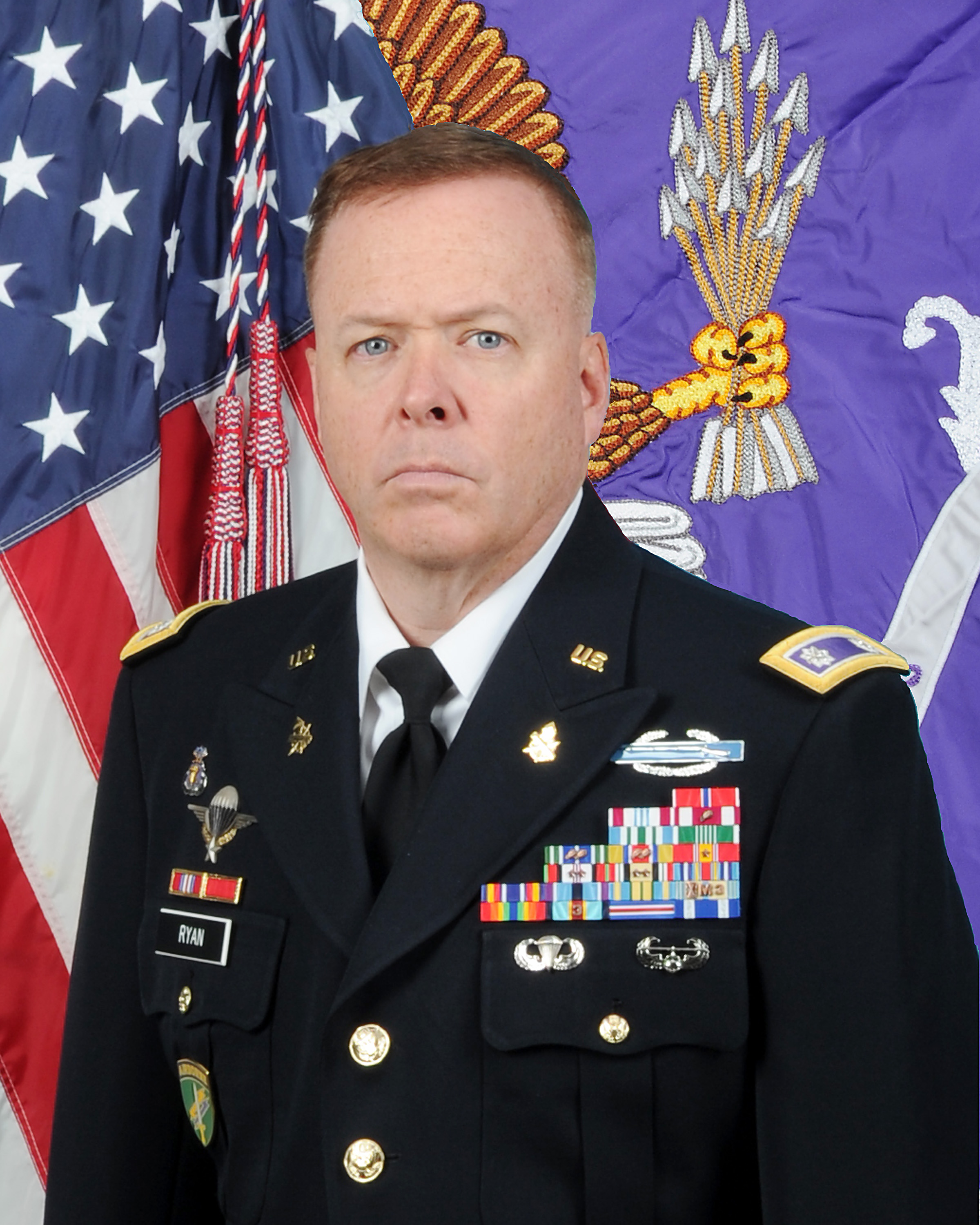
Stephen Ryan

1790–1807 – Captain John Delamater
1807–1809 – Brigadier General William Boyd
1809–1813 – Captain John McLean
1813–1816 – Dr. (Captain) George Warren Chapman
1816–1826 – Captain George Mills
1826–1845 – Dr. (Captain) George Warren Chapman
1845–1850 – Captain Richard Raynor
1850–1853 – Colonel Nicholas Haight
1853–1855 – Colonel James B. Murray
1855–1878 – Brigadier General Henry Raymond
1878–1890 – Brigadier General Abraham Daly Jr.
1890–1908 – Rev. Morgan Dix
1908–1919 – Colonel Asa Bird Gardiner
1919–1922 – Brigadier General William Groves Bates
1922–1946 – Major General Charles Elliot Warren
1946–1947 – Colonel Chandler Smith
1947–1950 – Colonel Edwin Bertan Conklin
1950–1957 – Colonel Frances Florian Steers
1957–1958 – Colonel William Grandy Goodwin
1958–1965 – Colonel Joseph Baird Magnus
1965–1970 – Colonel William Ely Chambers
1970–1975 – Colonel Sherman Post Haight Jr.
1975–1985 – Major General James Watson Gerard II
1985–1996 – Major General John Edward Connelly II
1996–1998 – Brigadier General Ralph Arthur Olson
1998–2002 – Major General John Edward Connelly III
2002–2008 – Major General David J. Ramsay
2008–2011 – Dr. (Colonel) Charles C. Lucas Jr.
2011–2020 – Colonel Stephen J. Ryan
2020–2022 – Colonel William J. McShane
2022–present – Colonel J. Raymond Mechmann

== Timeline ==
| Period | Event | |
|---|---|---|
| 1790 | The Veteran Corps of Artillery was organized on November 25, 1790 , at the City Arms Tavern by officers and soldiers who served in the Continental Army during the American Revolution. "Upon the Organization of the Corps in 1790, the uniform of the Continental Corps of Artillery of the Revolution was adopted" | |
| 1791 | The Veteran Corps of Artillery was approved as a separate and distinct organization in the Militia of the State of New York by then Governor of the State George Clinton on March 8, 1791. | United States Capitol C 1800 |
| 1792 | The Veteran Corps of Artillery was confirmed in statutory and prescriptive rights and privileges as a separate Corps in the Active Militia, of Congress on May 8, 1792 (Sec. 1641, U.S. Revised Statutes), also January 21, 1903 (Sec. 3). | |
| 1812-15 | The Veteran Corps of Artillery volunteered and entered military service of the United States during the War of 1812. | |
| 1824 | During the official return and official state visit of Lafayette to America, the VCA was placed to the right of line a place of honor among other militia units of the state, for his official arrival in New York City. | |
| 1826 | The Military Society of the War of 1812 was established in the City of New York on January 3, 1826, as a military society composed exclusively by commissioned officers of that War: regular and volunteer. | |
| 1848 | The Society of the War of 1812 and the Veteran Corps of Artillery were consolidated on January 8, 1848. | |
| 1857 | The Veteran Corps Artillery guarded the NY State Arsenal from attack during the Dead Rabbits Riot. | |
| 1861 | Veteran Corps of Artillery served as Battery G, 4th Artillery Regiment of the New York State Militia (National Guard) during the American Civil War. | |
| 1863 | The Veteran Corps of Artillery took part in restoring order during the New York Draft Riots, protecting the State Arsenal from being looted of its muskets and ammunition. | |
| 1890 | A "joint resolution" by the Congress of the United States incorporating the Society of the War of 1812 into an historic military command was approved on September 25, 1890. | |
| 1892 | The Society of the War of 1812 was incorporated as a military society under the laws of the State of New York on January 8, 1892. | |
| 1895 | Brigadier General Asa Bird Gardiner begins work on the revitalization of both the Veteran Corps of Artillery, and the Military Society of 1812. The Military Society of 1812 as an organization is ratified by New York State Legislature on 9 March 1895. | Asa Bird Gardiner |
| 1917 | Following America's entry into World War I, The Veteran Corps of Artillery was called up for state active duty by the Governor to help guard the reservoirs in Upstate New York protecting the New York City water supply from sabotage. | |
| 1917-18 | Three officers from the Veteran Corps of Artillery traveled to both Britain and the front lines of France to study and translate (from French) the tactical field manual for Anti-Aircraft Artillery, later adopted as the manual for the U.S. Army. | |
| 1917-19 | The Veteran Corps of Artillery under their Vice Commandant, LTC John Delafield, became the 9th Coast Artillery Corps, New York Guard, embodying the Veteran Corps of Artillery; most of this unit served at Fort Hancock, New Jersey, with some serving in France with the 57th Artillery, Coast Artillery Corps. | |
| 1920-39 | The Veteran Corps of Artillery provided federally approved officer training camps in the summer months for instruction for Organized Reserve Officers. | |
| 1940 | The Corps relocated its headquarters from the 71st Regiment Armory on Park Ave and East 33rd Street to its present location at the 7th Regiment Armory. | |
| 1941-45 | At the outbreak of America's entry in World War II, The Veteran Corps of Artillery was not called up as a unit, however large numbers of its members of military age enlisted and served in various branches of the U.S. Armed Forces and in all theaters of operations. | |
| 1974 | The Veteran Corps of Artillery acquired three 75 mm pack howitzers from the New York Army National Guard to be used once again for ceremonial firings. The VCA resumed firing the annual salute to the nation from the battery for the first time since 1890. | |
| 1986 | The Veteran Corps of Artillery Firing Battery conducted firing battery salutes from multiple locations in and around New York Harbor for the 100th anniversary celebration and re-dedication of the Statue of Liberty on July 4. | |
| 1994 | On June 6 the Veteran Corps of Artillery fired a 21 gun salute to commemorate the 50th anniversary of the D-Day landings in Normandy. The VCA conducted the ceremony on the Great Lawn in New York City's Central Park. | |
| 1996 | On January 1 the VCA resumed its role as the honor guard to the Governor's inauguration for the first time since the administrations of Governor Nelson Rockefeller. | |
| 1998 | August 5 select members of the VCA began volunteering to attend annual training with the New York Guard at the New York Army National Guard's training site, Camp Smith, located across from West Point in Peekskill, New York. | |
| 1999 | On July 3 The VCA firing battery welcomed an international naval flotilla, firing salutes from Fort Hamilton and the following day welcomed the tall ships review breaking with tradition by special request of the U.S. Army and fired its traditional July 4 50 round salute from Fort Hamilton in Brooklyn. | |
| 2001 | Volunteers from The Veteran Corps of Artillery assisted the 88th Brigade New York Guard immediately following the attacks on September 11. Corps members worked from the 7th Regiment Armory at the New York National Guard's emergency operations center. | |
| 2008 | In October the Corps helped plan and conduct the re-dedication for the 100th anniversary of the Prison Ship Martyrs' Monument in Fort Greene Park, Brooklyn, in remembrance to the thousands of American soldiers and sailors held as prisoners of war who suffered and died on board the prison ships anchored off Brooklyn during the American Revolutionary War. | |
| 2008 | On November 25 the VCA led the march of all United States military units through lower Manhattan for the 225th commemoration of Evacuation Day. | |
| 2009 | On November 2 the Veteran Corps of Artillery participated in New York City's official welcome near Ground Zero for the newly constructed naval vessel, USS New York built with steel from the World Trade Center. The ship paused off Battery Park to fire a 21 gun salute as it sailed up the Hudson River to the commissioning ceremony. | USS New York |
| 2011 | On October 28, 2011, and at the request from the office of the U.S. Army Chief of Staff, the Veteran Corps of Artillery (assisted by the 1/258th Field Artillery) began the official celebration of the 125th Anniversary of the Statue of Liberty. At approximately 10:00AM, the VCA fired a single 4 gun volley to signal the start of the event. Later that morning, the VCA fired a 19 Gun Salute in honor of foreign dignitaries present for the celebration. | Statue of Liberty |

== Image gallery ==
Veteran Corps of Artillery gallery

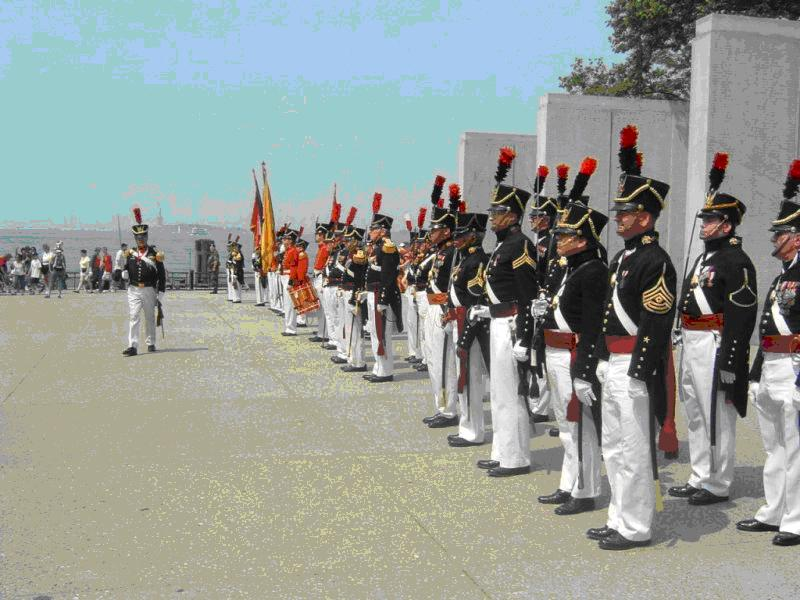
Members of the corps on parade

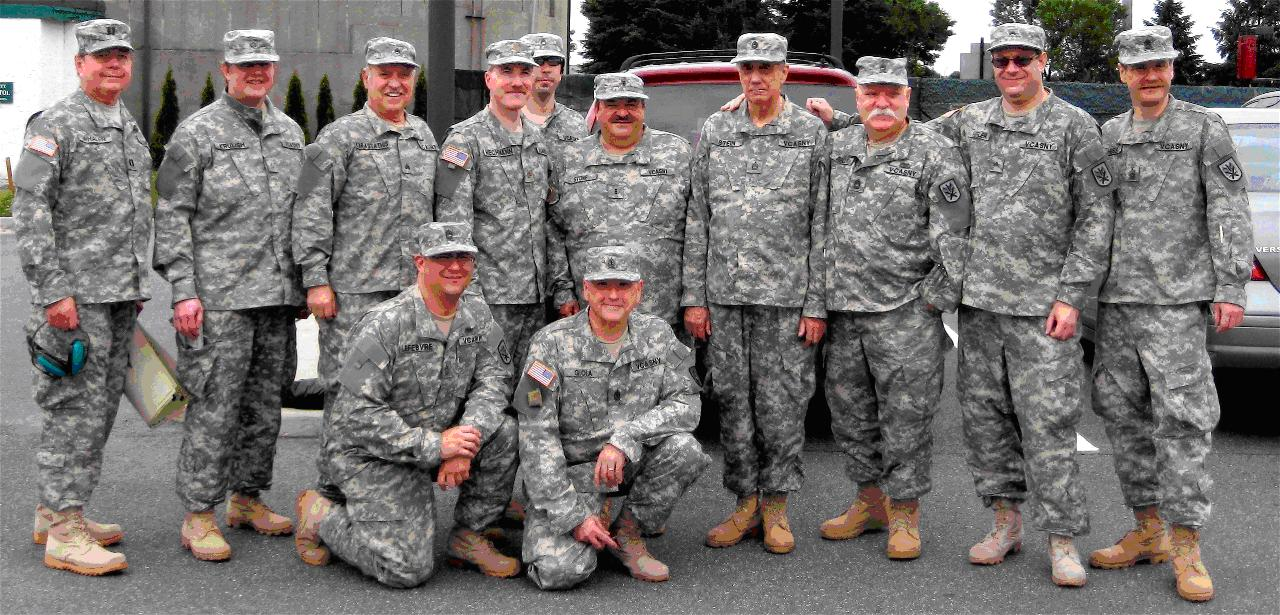
Members of the corps at monthly training

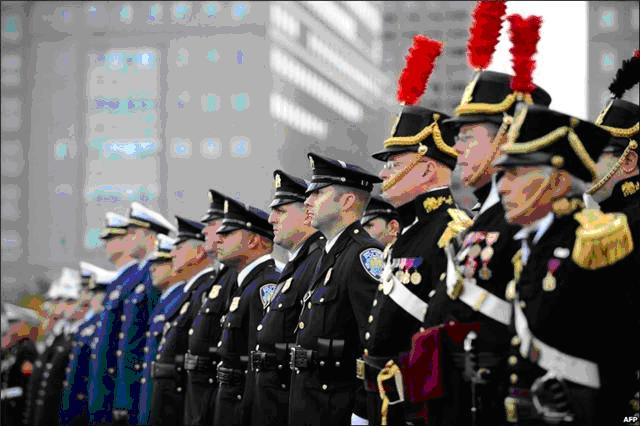
Members of the corps in New York City
