= 244th Air Defense Artillery Regiment =

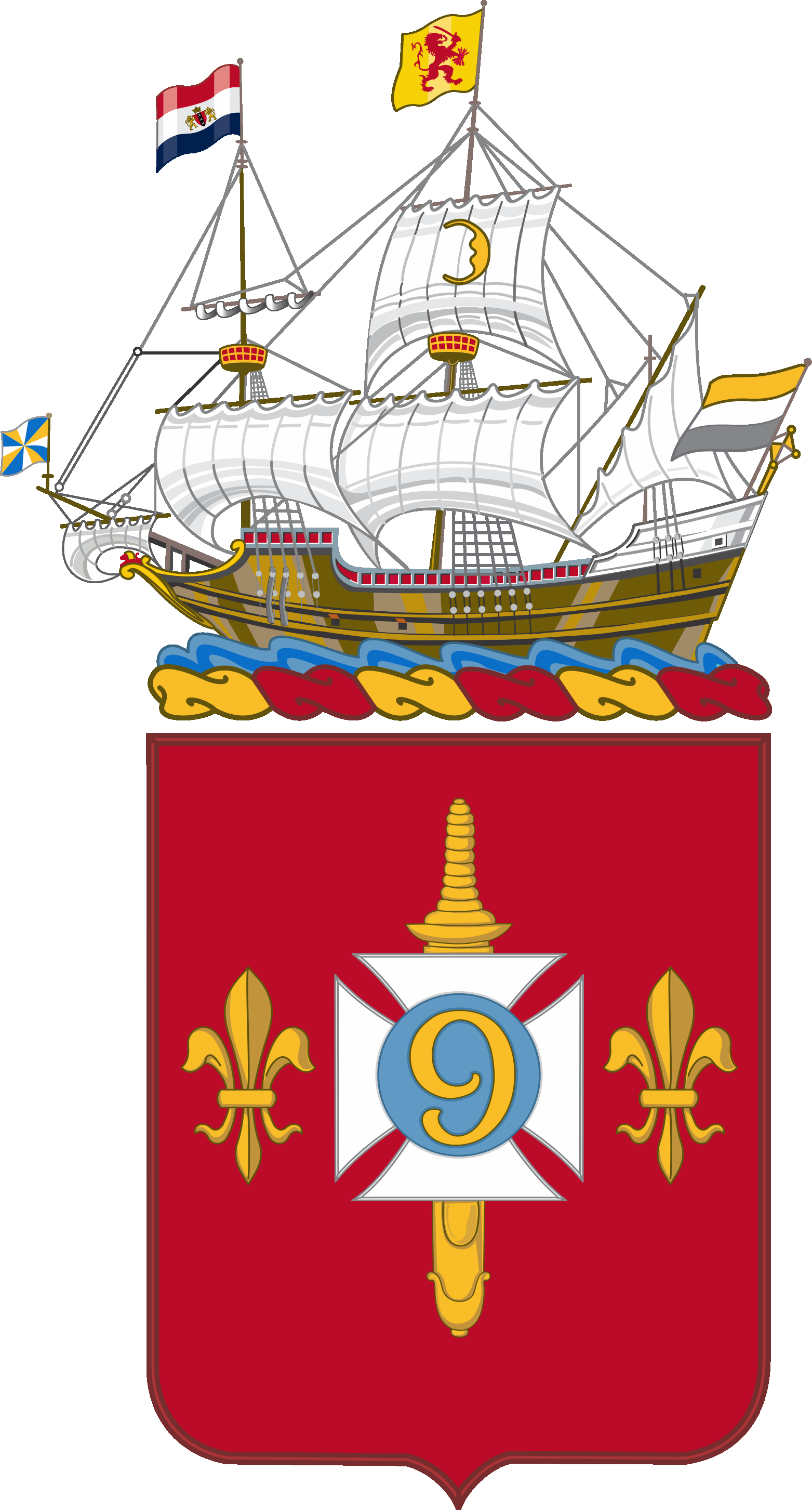
- Active: 1799-present
- Country: USA
- Branch: Army
- Type: Air defense artillery
- Nickname: Irish Ninth
- Motto: Ratione Aut Vi (By Reason Or By Force)
- Engagements: American Civil War; World War II

Commanders
- Notable commanders: Colonel James Fisk

Insignia
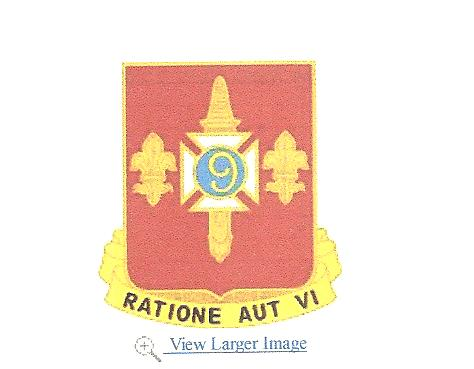
- Distinctive unit insignia

The 244th Air Defense Artillery Regiment is an air defense artillery regiment of the United States Army first formed on June 24, 1799, as the 6th Regiment of Infantry (NYNG).

== History ==
- Constituted 24 June 1799 in the New York National Guard as the 6th Regiment of Infantry and organized from existing units which date back to 1785 by transfer of 4 companies of the 1st Regiment; 3 Companies from the 2nd Regiment; 5 Companies from 3rd Regiment; 2 Companies from 4th Regiment all organized March 4, 1786; 3 Companies from the 5th Regiment organized May 11, 1789; and the Independent Rifle Company organized August 28, 1798.
- March 8, 1800 6th Regiment N.Y.S.I. organized under command of Lt.Col. Commandant Jacob Morton.
- March 27, 1805 designation changed from 6th Regiment of Infantry to 2d Regiment of Artillery, New York City.
- June 13, 1812 designation changed from 2d Regiment of Artillery to 9th Regiment of Artillery.
- December 13, 1813 Regiment reduced to a battalion.
- June 6, 1816 reorganized as a regiment retaining its number, although as a battalion known as 1st Battalion, New York State Artillery.
- May 29, 1850 By a change of regimental districts, officers and men transferred to other regiments; unit became the 9th Regiment, New York State Militia, known as the "Irish Ninth"
- May 3, 1858 "Irish Ninth" disbanded; district of 9th Regiment retained
- June 25, 1859 Regiment comes back into existence.
- From 1859 to 1969 the regiment's armory was at 125 West 14th Street in Manhattan.
- 1861-1864 during US Civil War served as the 83rd New York Volunteer Infantry Regiment.

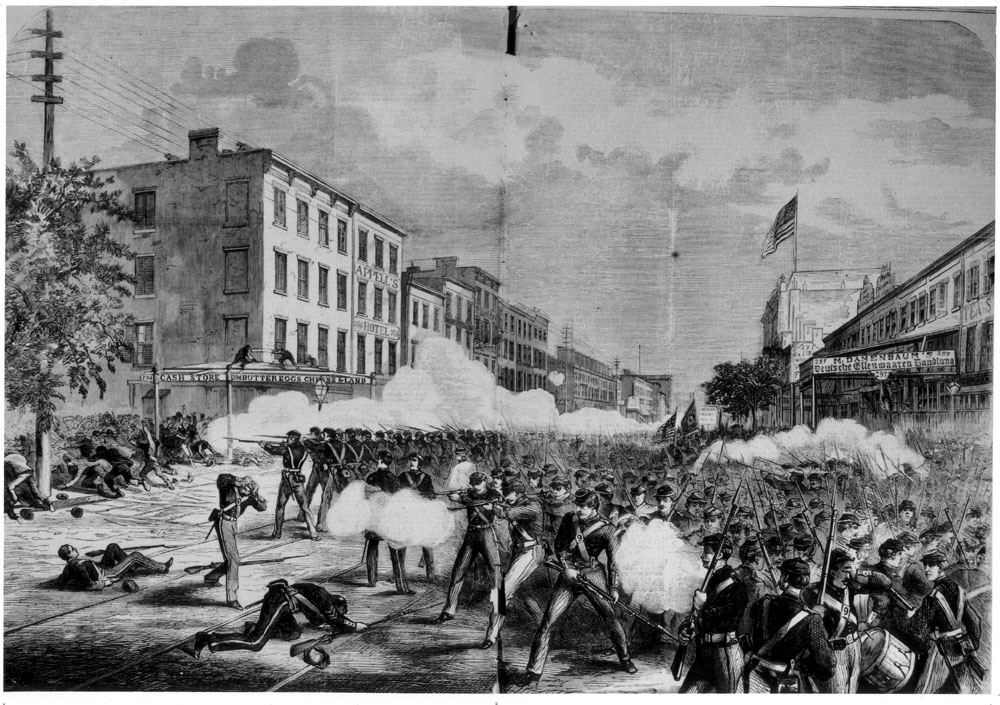
The Orange Riot of 1871 illustration which depicts the 9th N.Y.S.M. Regiment

- May 1898-November 15, 1898 during Spanish–American War served as the 9th New York Volunteer Infantry; increased to a 12 company Regiment by addition of Companies L and M-extra companies disbanded December 22, 1898.
- January 23, 1908 - in order to conform to Military Law, the 9th is converted to Coast Artillery, making it part of the Coast Artillery Corps, National Guard, New York as the 9th Artillery District, with Companies A to K changed to 13th to 22nd Companies, Coast Artillery Corps, respectively.

=== World War I service ===
Mustered into federal service August 5, 1917 and assigned to Coast Defenses of Sandy Hook, New Jersey where redesignated January 11, 1918 as serial numbered companies of CD Sandy Hook. Demobilized December 1918 at Fort Hancock, NJ.

- October 6, 1917 organized as a depot battalion and transferred to 8th Coast Artillery Corps. General Order 45 Adjutant General's Office
- October 8, 1917 Reorganized as 9th Regiment, C.A.C., N.Y.G. (New York Guard) by transfer to it of the Veteran Corps of Artillery of the State of New York.
- August 7, 1919 designation changed to Coast Defense Command (G.O.22 A.G.O.) and changes made to companies as follows.

Companies Mustered into New York Guard and remarks:

- Field And Staff:November 19, 1917.
- Headquarters Company:December 21, 1917. Mustered out November 6, 1919.
- Sanitary Detachment: December 12, 1917.
- Supply Company: November 19, 1917. Mustered out October 15, 1919.
- 1st Company: November 12, 1917. Changed to 13th Company after G.O.22 1919.
- 2nd Company: November 12, 1917. Changed to 14th Company after G.O.22 1919.
- 3rd Company: November 12, 1917. Changed to 15th Company after G.O.22 1919.
- 4th Company: November 14, 1917. Changed to 16th Company after G.O.22 1919.
- Fifth Company (Far Rockaway): October 19, 1917. Transferred to 8th C.A.C. October 6, 1917.
- 5th Company: February 14, 1918. Changed to 17th Company after G.O.22 1919.
- 6th Company: November 13, 1917. Changed to 18th Company after G.O.22 1919.
- 7th Company: November 15, 1917. Changed to 19th Company after G.O.22 1919.
- 8th Company: November 19, 1917. Changed to 20th Company after G.O.22 1919.
- 9th Company: May 2, 1918. Changed to 21st Company after G.O.22 1919.
- 10th Company:January 23, 1918. Changed to 22nd Company after G.O.22 1919.
- 11th Company:December 5, 1917 (organized as Home Defense Unit). Changed to 23rd Company after G.O.22 1919.
- 12th Company:January 23, 1918. Changed to 24th Company after G.O.22 1919; disbanded November 8, 1919 after G.O. 30 (A.G.O.); 12th Company, 13th C.D.C. assigned as 24th Company.
- Machine Gun Company:April 29, 1918. Mustered out November 8, 1919.

Most troops of the 18th, 19th, and 22nd Companies were reassigned to the 57th Artillery, Coast Artillery Corps on January 11, 1918, served in France, returned to the US, and were demobilized in February 1919.

=== Between World War I and World War II ===
On June 18, 1920, the regiment was reorganized and redesignated as the 9th Coast Defense Command, New York National Guard. On February 1, 1924, redesignated as 244th Artillery, Coast Artillery Corps. On May 14, 1924, redesignated as 244th Coast Artillery (Tractor Drawn) Regiment, Coast Artillery Corps. Regiments of this type were usually armed with 24 155 mm GPF guns on towed mounts.

=== World War II service ===
Inducted into federal service September 16, 1940 at New York City and moved to Camp Pendleton, Virginia, September 23, 1940. Participated in the Carolina Maneuvers from September 29, 1941, to December 3, 1941, whereupon it returned to Camp Pendleton until December 21, 1941.

The HHB was inactivated in May 1942 with personnel transferred to the 50th Coast Artillery (Tractor Drawn).

On December 21, 1941, the 1st Battalion moved to Fort Macon, North Carolina, where it established the Temporary Harbor Defenses of Beaufort, North Carolina. Reinforced by the 2nd Battalion, 54th Coast Artillery (Colored) in July 1942, it served at Fort Macon until September 1942, when it was relieved by the 3rd Battalion, 2nd Coast Artillery and moved via the New York Port of Embarkation to the United Kingdom. The 1st Battalion was inactivated on May 17, 1944, at Honiton, reorganized, and redesignated as the 633rd Antiaircraft Artillery Automatic Weapons Battalion. This unit landed in France on June 16, 1944, and served in the European Theater until it returned to New York and was inactivated on October 6, 1945.

On December 24, 1941, the 2nd Battalion moved to Fort Lewis, Washington, where it staged for deployment to the Territory of Alaska via the Seattle Port of Embarkation. 2nd Battalion was inactivated in Alaska on June 5, 1944, and reorganized and redesignated as the 289th Coast Artillery Battalion (155 mm gun). It moved to Camp Joseph T. Robinson, Arkansas, and was reorganized and redesignated as the 782nd Field Artillery Battalion (8-inch howitzer), on August 17, 1944. This unit was further reorganized and redesignated as the 782nd Chemical Mortar Battalion on July 5, 1945, at Camp Bowie, Texas, and was inactivated there on September 8, 1945.

The 3rd Battalion departed Camp Pendleton on January 17, 1942, and deployed to New Caledonia in the South Pacific Area. On January 20, 1943, the 3rd Battalion was reorganized and redesignated as the 259th Coast Artillery Battalion (155 mm gun). This unit deployed to Guadalcanal, Fiji, New Guinea, and the Philippines, and was inactivated on August 20, 1945, in the Philippines.

== Awards ==
As of 1915, the regiment was authorized to place silver rings on its colors as engraved as follows:

On the National Color:

- War against Great Britain, 1812–1815
- New York Harbor June 22-December 15, 1812 (North Battery)
- New York Harbor September 2-December 3, 1814 (West Battery)
- War of the Rebellion 1861-1865
- Harper's Ferry Va July 4, 1861
- Warrenton Junction, Va April 6, 1862
- Warrenton Junction, April 16, 1862
- North Fork River, Va. April 18, 1862
- Rappahannhock River. Va May 5, 1862
- Cedar Mountain, Va August 9, 1862
- Rappahannock River, Va August 22, 1862
- Rappahannhock Station, Va August 23, 1862
- Thoroughfare Gap, Va August 28, 1862
- Bull Run, Va, August 30, 1862
- Chantilly, Va September 1, 1862
- South Mountain, Md September 14, 1862
- Antietam, Md September 17, 1862
- Fredericksburg, Va December 11–15, 1862
- Pollack's Mill Creek, Va April 29, 1863
- Chancellorsville, VA May 2–3, 1863
- Gettysburg, Pa July 1–4, 1863
- Hagerstown, Md July 12–13, 1863
- Liberty, Va November 21, 1863
- Mine Run, Va, November 26 to December 2, 1863
- Wilderness, Va May 5–7, 1864
- Spotsylvania Court House, Va May 12, 1864
- Piney Branch Church, Va May 8, 1864
- LAurel Hill, Va, May 10, 1864
- Spotslvania Va, May 12, 1864
- North Anna, Va, May 22, 1864
- Totopotomay, VA May 27–31, 1864
- Cold Harbor, Va, June 1–7, 1864
- Spanish–American War, May 2 to November 15, 1898.

On the State Color:

- Execution of George Hart, January 3, 1812
- New York Harbor June 5, to July 28, 1812
- West Battery, New York Harbor, May 23, to June 1, 1813
- Sag harbor L.I. May 1, to August 1, 1814
- Brooklyn Heights August 15, 1814
- Brooklyn Heights, October 4, 1814
- Abolition Riot, January 11–12, 1835
- Great fire, December 17, 1835
- Police riot, June 16–18, 1857
- Dead Rabbits riot, July 5–6, 1857
- Orange Riots, July 12–13, 1871
- West Albany, July 24–28, 1877
- Buffalo, August 18–27, 1892
- Brooklyn, January 20–24, 1895
- Albany, May 17–19, 1901.

== Coat of arms ==
- Blazon
- Shield: Gules, between in fess two fleurs-de-lis a sheathed Roman sword point to base Or debruised by a cross patée Argent charged with a hurt bearing the number “9” of the second.
- Crest: That for the regiments and separate battalions of the New York Army National Guard: On a wreath of the colors Or and Gules, the full-rigged ship “Half Moon” all Proper.
- Motto:RATIONE AUT VI (By Reason Or By Force).
- Symbolism:
- Shield: The shield is red for Artillery. A white cross patée was the badge of the 2d Division, 5th Corps, and a white disk the badge of the 2d Division, 1st Corps, of the Army of the Potomac during the Civil War. The disk has been made blue for contrast, conforming to the heraldic law of not placing metal on metal, and to produce the color combination white and blue, symbolizing the service as Infantry. The sheathed Roman sword, taken from the Spanish War service medal, denotes that the organization served within the continental limits of the United States during the Spanish–American War. The fleurs-de-lis represent the service of the 1st Trench Mortar Regiment and the 57th Artillery, Coast Artillery Corps, in France during World War I, which were formed from component parts of the regiment. The number “9” was used by the regiment from the time of its organization in 1859 until 1924.
- Crest: The crest is that of the New York Army National Guard.
- Background: The coat of arms was originally approved for the 244th Coast Artillery Regiment on 25 February 1936. It was redesignated for the 244th Artillery Regiment on 3 August 1962. The insignia was redesignated for the 244th Air Defense Artillery Regiment on 6 July 1972.

== Distinctive unit insignia ==
- Description: A Gold color metal and enamel device 1 3/8 inches (3.49 cm) in height overall consisting of a shield blazoned: Gules, between in fess two fleurs-de-lis a sheathed Roman sword point to base Or debruised by a cross patée Argent charged with a hurt bearing the number “9” of the second. Attached below and to the side of the shield a Gold scroll inscribed “RATIONE AUT VI” in Black letters.
- Symbolism: The shield is red for Artillery. A white cross patée was the badge of the 2d Division, 5th Corps, and a white disk the badge of the 2d Division, 1st Corps, of the Army of the Potomac during the Civil War. The disk has been made blue for contrast, conforming to the heraldic law of not placing metal on metal, and to produce the color combination white and blue, symbolizing the service as Infantry. The sheathed Roman sword, taken from the Spanish War service medal, denotes that the organization served within the continental limits of the United States during the Spanish–American War. The fleurs-de-lis represent the service of the 1st Trench Mortar regiment and the 57th Artillery, Coast Artillery Corps, in France during World War I, which were formed from component parts of the regiment. The number “9” was used by the regiment from the time of its organization in 1859 until 1924. The motto translates to “By Reason Or By Force.”
- Background: The distinctive unit insignia was originally approved for the 244th Coast Artillery Regiment on 23 March 1936. It was amended to delete the motto on 23 May 1936. It was redesignated for the 244th Artillery Regiment on 3 August 1962. The insignia was amended to add the motto on 29 August 1968. It was redesignated for the 244th Air Defense Artillery Regiment on 6 July 1972.

== See also ==
- Seacoast defense in the United States
- United States Army Coast Artillery Corps
- Harbor Defense Command
