= Harvard University Advanced Leadership Initiative =

Fellowship program of Harvard University

The Harvard University Advanced Leadership Initiative's goal is to assist experienced leaders who want to solve important social problems in the next stage of their professional lives. A key part of this assistance is providing an opportunity for the selected participants to spend one year in an intensive structured program at Harvard as Advanced Leadership Initiative Fellows. Faculty leadership for this initiative include Harvard Professors Rosabeth Moss Kanter, Rakesh Khurana, Fernando Reimers, Howard Koh, David Gergen, Barry Bloom, William George, Charles Ogletree, and Nitin Nohria. The program was founded in January 2009.

== Advanced Leadership Initiative Fellows ==
Advanced Leadership Initiative Fellows have included:

- Laurent Adamowicz – founder and president of the public charity Eradicate Childhood Obesity Foundation
- Keith Benson – drummer for the band MFSB and founder of the Department of P.E.A.C.E. Movement
- J. Veronica Biggins – former Director of Presidential Personnel for President Bill Clinton
- Anna Burger – former Secretary-Treasurer of the Service Employees International Union
- James A. Champy – Chairman Emeritus of Dell Services Consulting
- Michael Critelli – CEO of Dossia and former Executive Chairman of Pitney Bowes
- Gilberto Dimenstein – Columnist at the Brazilian newspaper Folha de S.Paulo
- John D. Gardner – retired United States Army lieutenant general and former commander of the United States Army South
- Philip I. Kent – American media executive. Former chief executive officer of Turner Broadcasting System Inc.
- Susan Leal – a water utility consultant, and the co-author of the book Running out of Water. Formerly, general manager of the San Francisco Public Utilities Commission, a San Francisco Treasurer and a San Francisco Supervisor.
- Thuli Madonsela – former public protector of South Africa
- Maryfrances Metrick – Canadian-American businesswoman
- Jessica Faieta – Senior Fellow and lecturer at the Jackson School of Global Affairs at Yale University. Formerly the United Nations Assistant Secretary-General and United Nations Development Program Regional Director for Latin America and the Caribbean
- Iyabo Obasanjo-Bello – former Nigerian Senator, and daughter of former President of Nigeria Olusegun Obasanjo
- Gale Pollock – retired United States Army major general who served as the Deputy Surgeon General of the United States Army, and also as chief of the Army Nurse Corps
- Rodney Slater – former U.S. Secretary of Transportation in the Clinton Administration
- Jennifer M. Smith – former premier of Bermuda from 1998 until 2003
- Gillian Sorensen – former Assistant Secretary-General of the United Nations and former Senior Advisor and National Advocate at the United Nations Foundation
- Jeffrey W. Talley – retired United States Army lieutenant general. The 32nd Chief of Army Reserve (CAR) and 7th commanding general, United States Army Reserve Command (USARC).
- Reyes Tamez – a Mexican immunochemist and former president of the Autonomous University of Nuevo León (UANL) and also former secretary of education in the cabinet of Vicente Fox (2000–2006).
