= Net Impact =

- Type: Non-Profit
- Founded: 1993
- Headquarters: Oakland, CA,
- Key people: Peter Lupoff, CEO
- Revenue: $1.037 million USD
- Website: www.netimpact.org

Net Impact is a nonprofit membership organization for students and professionals interested in using business skills in support of various social and environmental causes. It serves both a professional organization and one of the largest student organizations among MBAs in the world. From its central office in Oakland, the organization supports over 300 autonomous volunteer-run chapters and a membership base of over 100,000, with programs and networking events centered on topics such as corporate social responsibility, social entrepreneurship, nonprofit management, international development, and environmental sustainability. Additionally, various Net Impact Case Competitions are hosted annually throughout its university chapters to encourage teams to analyze and propose more sustainable business practices.

== Historical background ==
Net Impact was founded in 1993 as Students for Responsible Business (SRB). Its inaugural conference was convened by 13 graduate business students in collaboration with Mark Albion and a handful of members of Social Venture Network, an organization that has been a launching pad for several other organizations within the business and society movement. The organization grew steadily in its first few years as an organization exclusively for graduate students.

Beginning in 1998, a professional network of SRB alumni began to form. The organization was renamed Net Impact in 1999 in part to accommodate a shift toward inclusion of professional MBA graduates. The first professional chapter was launched in San Francisco in 2001, and in 2008 professionals made up 44% of all dues-paying members, and 23% of chapters.

In 2007, an undergraduate pilot program was initiated, growing to 34 undergraduate chapters by early 2009.

While the bulk of Net Impact’s activity has been focused in the United States, international chapters began as early as 1997 at INSEAD in Fontainebleau, France. The inaugural European conference was held in Geneva, Switzerland in June, 2008 in partnership with HEC Geneva IOMBA, INSEAD and the University of Nottingham. As of 2008 there were 40 student and professional chapters located outside the United States, on six continents.

Between 2004 and 2008, under the leadership of Executive Director Liz Maw, the organization increased its paid membership nearly fivefold, in keeping with a growth trend that has been identified among MBAs and society at large toward interest in responsible business practices.

In June 2019, Net Impact hired Peter Lupoff as its CEO.

== Programs ==
=== Conferences ===
Net Impact’s holds an annual conference in partnership with a business school. Conferences feature entrepreneurs, corporate leaders, and nonprofit leaders who seek to transform the world. Net Impact’s North American Conferences have been held in locations across the country.

Past keynote speakers at the conference have included Alicia Garza, Co-founder of Black Lives Matter, Doug McMillon, CEO of Walmart, Sally Jewell, President and CEO of REI; Yvon Chouinard, Founder of Patagonia; Tensie Whelan, Executive Director of the Rainforest Alliance; Chad Holliday, CEO of DuPont; Honorable Al Gore, Chairman of Generation Investment Management and former Vice President of the United States; Tom Chappell, CEO and Founder of Tom's of Maine; Gary Erickson, CEO of Clif Bar, Inc.; Andrew Yang, Candidate for the 2020 Democratic Party Presidential Nomination; and Orin Smith, President and CEO of Starbucks Coffee Company.

=== Publications ===
Net Impact produces an annual guide to graduate business programs titled Business as UNusual, soliciting the help of its chapters to report on how far sustainability is integrated into over 50 top-tier business schools, for the benefit of prospective students. Since 1996, it also has produced studies of the opinions of graduate and undergraduate students on the role business should play in society; a Social Impact Career Handbook for individuals interested in learning about possible career tracks using business and social responsibility; and the CSR Jobs Report, in partnership with Ellen Weinreb CSR Recruiting, analyzing the market for CSR jobs as well as jobs within socially responsible companies.

== See also ==
- Corporate Social Responsibility
- Net Impact Case Competition
- Social entrepreneurship
- Triple Bottom Line
- Socially-responsible investing
- MBA Oath
- Sustainable business
- Microfinance
