= Jeffrey W. Talley =

American general

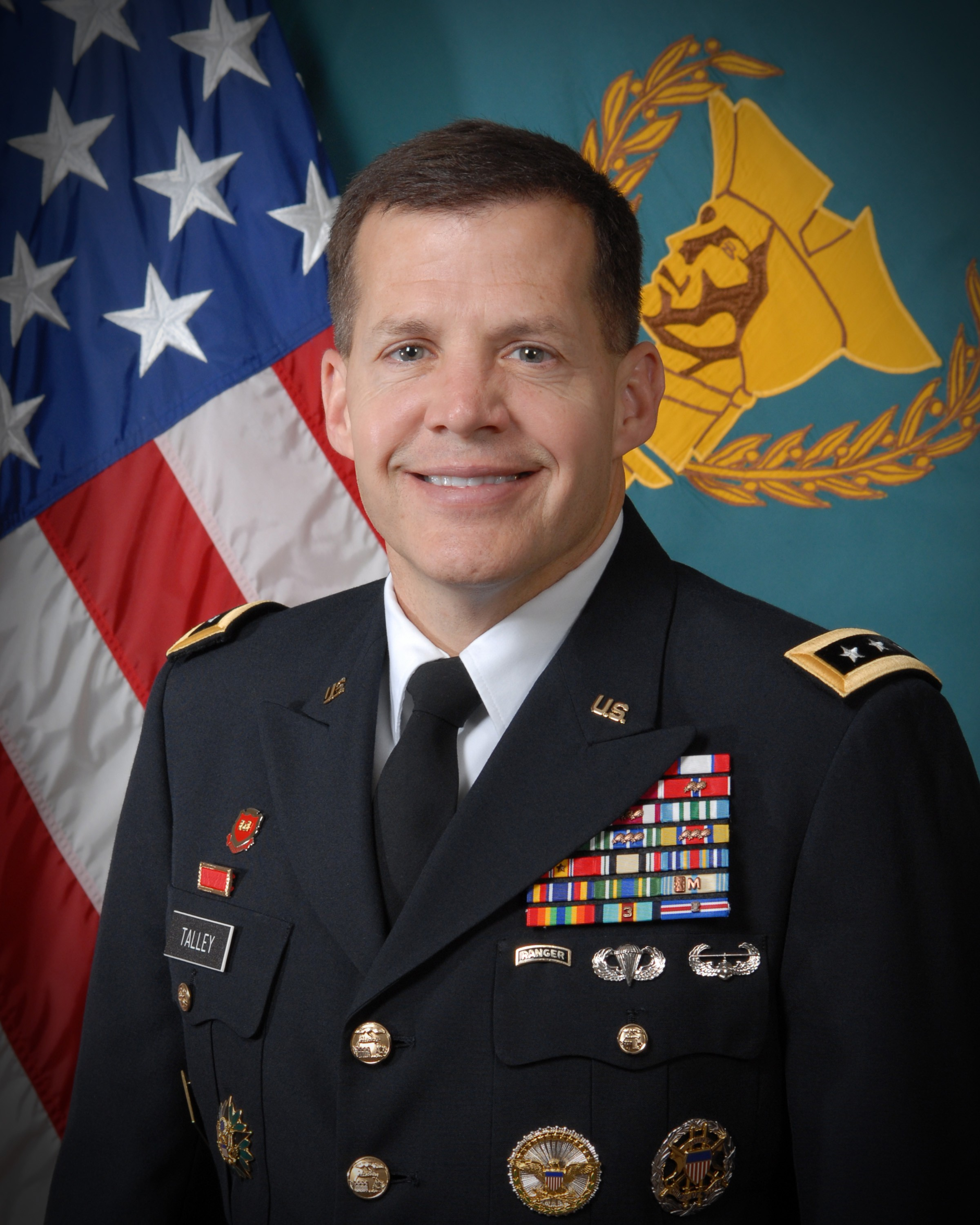
- Official portrait, 2012

32nd Chief of Army Reserve and Commanding General, U.S. Army Reserve Command
- In office June 9, 2012 – June 1, 2016
- Preceded by: Jack C. Stultz
- Succeeded by: Charles D. Luckey

Personal details
- Born: 27 September 1959 (age 66) St. Louis, Missouri, U.S.
- Spouse: Linda R. Hall (m. 1981)
- Children: 4
- Education: Louisiana State University (B.S.); Assumption College (M.A.); Washington University in St. Louis (M.L.A.); Johns Hopkins University (M.S.E.); Carnegie Mellon University (Ph.D.); U.S. Army War College (M.S.S.); University of Oxford (Executive M.B.A.)
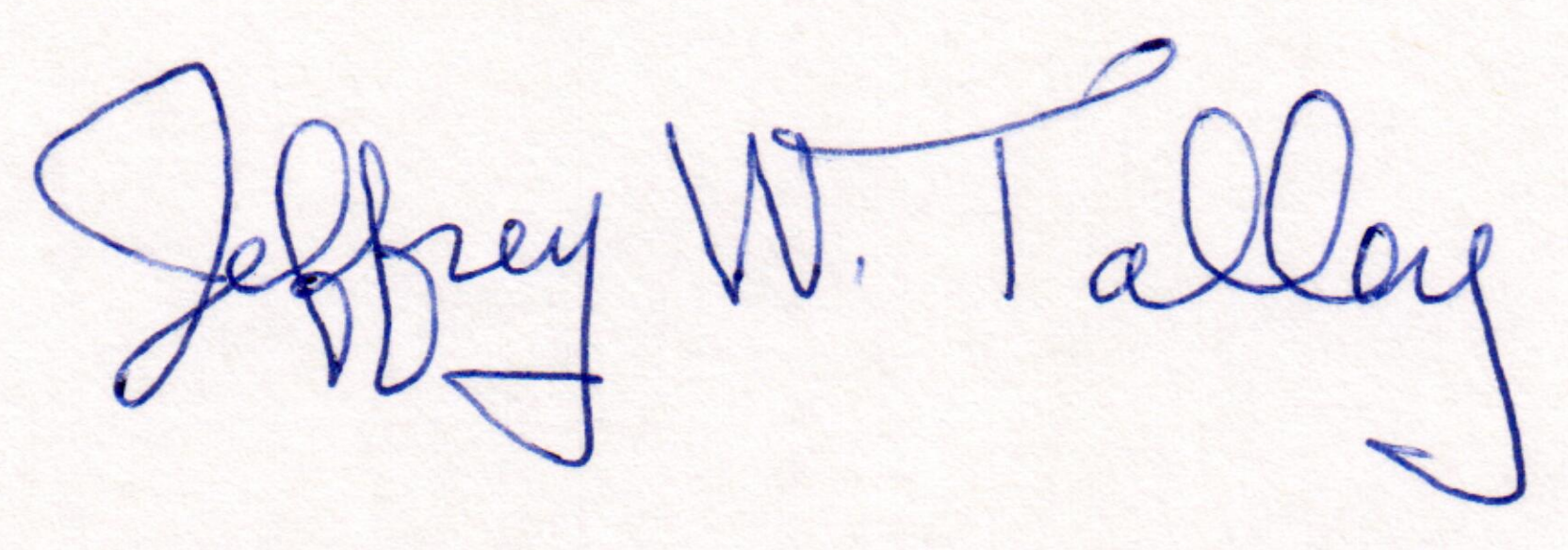
- Signature

Military service
- Allegiance: United States
- Branch/service: United States Army; Army Corps of Engineers
- Years of service: 1981–2016
- Rank: Lieutenant General
- Commands: U.S. Army Res Cmd (Fort Bragg, NC); 84th Division (Fort Knox, KY); 926th Engineer Bde, 4th Infantry Div (U.S. Forces Iraq); 926th Engineer Group (Montgomery, AL); 365th Engineer Battalion (Schuylkill Haven, PA); B Company, 44th Engineer Battalion, 8th Army (U.S. Forces Korea)
- Battles/wars: Operation Enduring Freedom (Kuwait/Southern Iraq); Operation Iraqi Freedom (Baghdad/Sadr City, Iraq)
- Awards: Army Dist. Service Medal (2); Legion of Merit; Bronze Star Medal (3); Meritorious Svc Med (4); Army Commendation Med (2); Army Achievement Med (4); Army Meritorious Unit Commendation; Reserve Component Achievement Med (5); National Defense Service Medal (2); Armed Forces Expeditionary Medal; Iraq Campaign Medal; Global War on Terrorism Service Medal; Korea Defense Service Medal; Armed Forces Reserve Medal (2); Army Service Ribbon; Overseas Service Ribbon (3); Army Reserve Overseas Training Ribbon (2); De Fleury Medal (3)

Jeffrey W. Talley (born September 27, 1959) is an American businessman, scholar, college president, and retired three-star general. His military and civilian contributions were recognized by the U.S. Senate on June 28, 2016, with Tribute to Lieutenant General Jeffrey W. Talley, as reflected in the congressional record. He is the 21st president of Belmont Abbey College.

Talley's military career included duty in the U.S., Korea, Kuwait, and Iraq. His military service culminated with three consecutive commanding general assignments including the 926th Engineer Brigade and Baghdad Provincial Engineer, 4th Infantry Division, Multi-National Division-Baghdad, during the Surge and fight for Sadr City in 2008; the 84th Training Command, where he trained units preparing for deployment from 2009 to 2012; and in 2012, he was appointed by the President to a four-year term as the 32nd Chief of Army Reserve and Commanding General of the U.S. Army Reserve Command.

He has received numerous medals and awards, including two Army Distinguished Medals and three Bronze Star Medals. He retired from the military in 2016 and was recognized by the Association of the U.S. Army with the MG James Earl Rudder Medal for the advancement of the goal of a seamless and component integrated Army.

== Early life and education ==
Talley was born in St. Louis, Missouri, the son of Gloria E. (Genter) and Donald E. Talley. He graduated from Yorktown High School in Arlington, Virginia in 1977. After spending his freshman year of college at Old Dominion University, he transferred to Louisiana State University (LSU). While at LSU, he was a Cadet of the Ole War Skule and an Army ROTC Scholarship recipient. As a cadet, he graduated from the U.S. Army Airborne School and was Distinguished Honor Graduate from the U.S. Army Air Assault School. His senior year, he was the Commander of Pershing Rifles Company D-16 and an Officer in the Scabbard and Blade. He graduated from LSU in 1981 with a B.S. in Forestry (Natural Resource Management) and was a Distinguished Military Graduate.

While serving on active duty in the military, Talley completed an M.A. in Religious Studies from Assumption College in 1985, and an M.L.A. (History & Philosophy) from Washington University in St. Louis in 1988. Upon leaving the Regular Army in 1992, he enrolled at The Johns Hopkins University where he received his M.S.E. in Environmental Engineering & Science in 1995. In 2000, he earned his Ph.D. in Civil and Environmental Engineering from Carnegie Mellon University. His dissertation research won the U.S. Department of Defense’s Strategic Environmental Research and Development (SERDP) project of the year award.

In 2001, Talley was selected as an Army reservist to attend the U.S. Army War College Distance Education Program. Through a series of distance learning and resident sessions, he completed his studies in 2003 and was awarded an M.S.S. (Military & Strategic Leadership). In 2010, he began an executive graduate program in global business at the University of Oxford. Over the next 22 months he would commute to and from England, graduating from Keble College in 2011 with an Executive MBA. While at Oxford, he would also create a series of tech start-ups with one of his classmates, winning the Saïd Business School Venture Fund Competition for best new start-up.

== Personal life ==
He married his wife Linda in 1981. They have four children.

== Military career ==
=== The Regular Army (1981–1992) ===
Upon graduation from LSU in December 1981, Talley received a Regular Army commission as a second lieutenant in the U.S. Army Corps of Engineers. After completing the Engineer Officer Basic Course at Ft. Belvoir, Virginia, and the U.S. Army Ranger School at Ft. Benning, Georgia, he reported to his first permanent duty assignment at Ft. Devens, Massachusetts. He was assigned to the 39th Engineer Battalion where he served as 1st Platoon Leader, Alpha Company, and later as Battalion Adjutant (S-1). In August 1985, he was promoted to captain en route to the St. Louis District, U.S. Army Corps of Engineers where he worked in Construction Division on Lock & Dam 26 (Replacement), the largest civil works project in the U.S. at that time. He would later serve in both Engineering and Planning Divisions.

Following his assignment in St. Louis, Talley returned to Ft. Belvoir for the Engineer Officer Advance Course. Upon graduation, he volunteered to go to the Republic of Korea for an unaccompanied assignment with the 44th Engineer Battalion, Eight U.S. Army. After a short stint as Assistant Battalion Operations Officer (Assistant S-3) at Camp Mercer (vicinity Seoul), he took command of Bravo Company and Camp Nimble (Dongducheon), in support of 2nd Infantry Division and its demilitarized zone (DMZ) mission. After two years in Korea, he returned to the U.S. for Combined Arms Service Staff (CAS3) School at Ft. Leavenworth, Kansas.

Upon graduation from CAS3, Talley was assigned to the Baltimore District, U.S. Army Corps of Engineers, where he worked in the Hazardous Toxic Radiological Waste Branch of Engineering Division. There he supported the design and remediation of contaminated sites around the country, including the Times Beach Superfund project in Missouri, considered by many to be the most toxic site in America. In April 1992, Talley resigned his Regular Army commission, leaving active duty as a senior Captain, and transferring to the U.S. Army Reserve.

=== The Army Reserve (1992–2012) ===
Talley's first assignment in the Army Reserve was Assistant Operations Officer (Assistant S-3), 315th Engineer Group, New Cumberland Army Depot, New Cumberland, Pennsylvania. In December 1993, he was promoted to major and served as the Group's Operations Officer (S-3). Subsequently, he was assigned to the 365th Engineer Battalion in Schuylkill Haven, Pennsylvania as the Battalion Operations Officer (S-3). While at the 365th, he also graduated from the U.S. Army Command and General Staff College.

Talley relocated in April 1996 to Vicksburg, Mississippi to join the 412th Engineer Command. While at the 412th, he served as the Commanding General's personal Plans Officer, and later as Commandant. After two years in command, he returned to the 365th to be the Battalion Executive Officer, but only to return to the 412th a year later to serve as its Secretary General Staff. Selected early for battalion command, he returned to the 365th in February 1999. He was promoted to lieutenant colonel in April 2000.

Upon completion of battalion command in February 2002, he became the Deputy Operations Officer (Deputy G-3) at the 416th Engineer Command in Darien, Illinois. In December 2002, Talley was called to active duty and in February 2003 he mobilized and deployed in support of Operation Enduring Freedom and Operation Iraq Freedom. While in theater, he was the Chief of Operations for the 416th which was part of the Coalition Joint Forces Land Component Command. There he was responsible for the planning and execution of hundreds of combat and construction missions throughout Kuwait and Iraq. He was awarded the Bronze Star (1st award). Upon graduation from the U.S. Army War College in 2003, Talley served in the Pentagon as a Strategic Planner in the Deputy Directorate for the War on Terrorism, Strategic Plans & Policy Directorate (J-5), Joint Chiefs of Staff. Promoted to colonel in February 2005, he was reassigned to command the 926th Engineer Group in Montgomery, Alabama. The 926th was the largest engineer group in the Total Army with over 7,000 Soldiers scattered across multiple states. As part of an Army force structure change, the group was reorganized and re-designated as Headquarters and Headquarters Company, 926th Engineer Brigade. At that time, reserve brigades were one-star commands. Talley was selected to be its first Commanding General and promoted to brigadier general in August 2007.

In January 2008, Talley returned to active duty in support of Operation Iraqi Freedom as Commander, 926th Engineer Brigade, 4th Infantry Division, Multi-National Division - Baghdad and the Baghdad Provincial Engineer. While in Iraq, he led an organization consisting of thousands of engineers in the rebuilding of Baghdad to include restoring essential services and eliminating threats from improvised explosive devices. He is credited with developing a military and policy strategy widely referred to as “Engineering the Peace” that aimed to reduce violence in destabilized communities by rapidly rebuilding infrastructure, schools and hospitals in the militia stronghold of Sadr City and across Baghdad. He was awarded two Bronze Stars (2nd & 3rd award) - one for his efforts in rebuilding Baghdad, and the other for meritorious achievement in combat during the January 2009 planning and execution of security operations for the Baghdad provincial elections.

Upon return from Iraq, Talley assumed command of the 84th Training Command at Ft. Knox, Kentucky in June 2009 and was promoted to major general. At the 84th, he was responsible for training and assessing the readiness of units through Combat Training Center-like exercises in preparation for their upcoming combat deployments. He relinquished command in April 2012 and was awarded the Army Distinguished Service Medal (1st award). He also served on the Reserve Forces Policy Board within the Office of the Secretary of Defense from 2009 to 2012.

=== Chief of Army Reserve and commanding general, U.S. Army Reserve Command (2012–2016) ===
President Obama nominated Talley to be the Chief of Army Reserve and Commanding General, U.S. Army Reserve Command on March 20, 2012. The U.S. Senate confirmed the nomination on May 3, 2012. Talley was appointed to the rank of lieutenant general in the Regular Army on June 9, 2012, at a ceremony at Ft. Bragg, North Carolina. Immediately after his appointment, he assumed command of the U.S. Army Reserve Command (USARC) and was sworn in as the 32nd Chief of Army Reserve. General Raymond T. Odierno, 38th Chief of Staff of the U.S. Army, officiated the appointment, the change of command, and the swearing-in ceremonies.

As the Chief of the Army Reserve, Talley was the principal staff adviser to the Chief of Staff of the U.S. Army on all Army Reserve Affairs. He developed Army Reserve budgets, training programs and policy decisions; managed the Army Reserve troop program units, individual mobilization augmentees, and the active guard/reserve program; and served as the appropriation director of all Army Reserve funds. As the Commanding General, U.S. Army Reserve Command, Talley commanded all Army Reserve troops in the Continental U.S. and had administrative control over the Army Reserve troops overseas, with a total end strength of 205,000 Soldiers and over 12,000 civilians. During Talley's tenure, the Army Reserve mobilized over 62,000 Soldiers to over 30 countries, including continued support to operations in Iraq and Afghanistan; all while overcoming unprecedented challenges including the first reduction to the Reserve force since the end of the Korean War, severe budget cuts known as sequestration and a government shutdown. To improve the Army Reserve's support to the Total Force, he developed the “Plan, Prepare and Provide” readiness model that placed Army Reserve Engagement Cells and Teams into every Army Service Component Command and Combatant Command around the world. He also created the Reserve's Private Public Partnership program, which built partnerships with civilian companies and organizations and helps Soldiers and their families find employment or advance their civilian careers.

Talley relinquished command of the Army Reserve to General Robert B. "Abe" Abrams, the commanding general of U.S. Army Forces Command, on June 1, 2016, at Ft. Bragg, North Carolina. Concurrently, he ended his statutory appointment as the Chief of Army Reserve.

=== Retirement from the U.S. Army ===
Talley retired from the U.S. Army on June 30, 2016, at the rank of Lieutenant General, having served almost 35 years in active and reserve assignments. Talley and his wife Linda were honored at a Special Retirement Review at Conmy Hall at Joint Base Myer-Henderson Hall, Virginia. The ceremony was conducted by the 3rd U.S. Infantry (The Old Guard) and hosted by General Mark A. Milley, 39th Chief of Staff of the U.S. Army. Talley was awarded the Army Distinguished Service Medal (2nd award).

=== Continued recognition ===
On April 28, 2023, Mr. Talley was awarded the Gold de Fleury Medal, the highest honor bestowed by the U.S. Army Engineer Regiment & the Corps of Engineers.

== Education career ==
In 2025, Talley was named the incoming president of Belmont Abbey College.

== Dates of rank ==
Rank	Date
Second Lieutenant	December 19, 1981
First Lieutenant	June 19, 1983
Captain	August 1, 1985
Major	December 18, 1993
Lieutenant Colonel	April 12, 2000
Colonel	February 17, 2005
Brigadier General	August 13, 2007
Major General	June 19, 2009
Lieutenant General	June 9, 2012

== Medals and ribbons ==
Military Decorations
Army Distinguished Service Medal (with oak leaf cluster)
Legion of Merit
Bronze Star (with two oak leaf clusters)
Meritorious Service Medal (with three oak leaf clusters)
Joint Service Commendation Medal
Army Commendation Medal (with oak leaf cluster)
Army Achievement Medal (with three oak leaf clusters)
Army Reserve Component Achievement Medal (with four oak leaf clusters)
National Defense Service Medal (with service star)
Armed Forces Expeditionary Medal
Iraq Campaign Medal (with Campaign Star)
Global War on Terrorism Service Medal
Korea Defense Service Medal
Armed Forces Reserve Medal (with M Device and Silver Hourglass)
Army Service Ribbon
Army Overseas Service Ribbon
Army Reserve Components Overseas Training Ribbon
Army Meritorious Unit Commendation

Badges, Patches, and Tabs
Basic Parachutist Badge
Air Assault Badge
Ranger Tab
Army Staff Identification Badge
Office of the Joint Chiefs of Staff Identification Badge
Office of the Secretary of Defense Identification Badge
926 Engineer Brigade Shoulder Sleeve Insignia worn as his Combat Service Identification Badge
926 Engineer Brigade Distinctive Unit Insignia
3 Overseas Service Bars
Gold, Silver, and Bronze De Fleury Medals
