= Nitin Nohria =

American business writer (born 1962)

10th Dean of Harvard Business School
- In office January 1, 2010 – December 31, 2020
- Preceded by: Jay Owen Light
- Succeeded by: Srikant Datar

Personal details
- Born: February 9, 1962 (age 64) New Delhi, India
- Spouse: Monica Chandra
- Education: IIT Bombay (BTech); JBIMS; University of Mumbai (MBA); Massachusetts Institute of Technology (PhD)

Nitin Nohria (born February 9, 1962) is an Indian-American academic who was the dean of Harvard Business School from 2010 to 2020. He is also the George F. Baker Professor of Administration. He is a former non-executive director of Tata Sons.

In January 2025, he was honored with the Padma Shri, India's fourth-highest civilian award, by the Government of India.

== Early life and education ==
Nitin Nohria was born in a Hindu Baniya (trader) family originally from Khetri, Rajasthan, India. His father, Kewal Nohria, was the former chairman of Crompton Greaves in India, and was one of the reasons Nohria decided to embark upon a career in business.

Nohria attended high school at St. Columba's School in New Delhi, India. He earned a B.Tech in Chemical Engineering at the Indian Institute of Technology Bombay, graduating in 1984, and then received an MBA from Jamnalal Bajaj Institute of Management Studies at the University of Mumbai. He earned a PhD in Management from the Sloan School of Management at Massachusetts Institute of Technology in 1988.

== Career ==
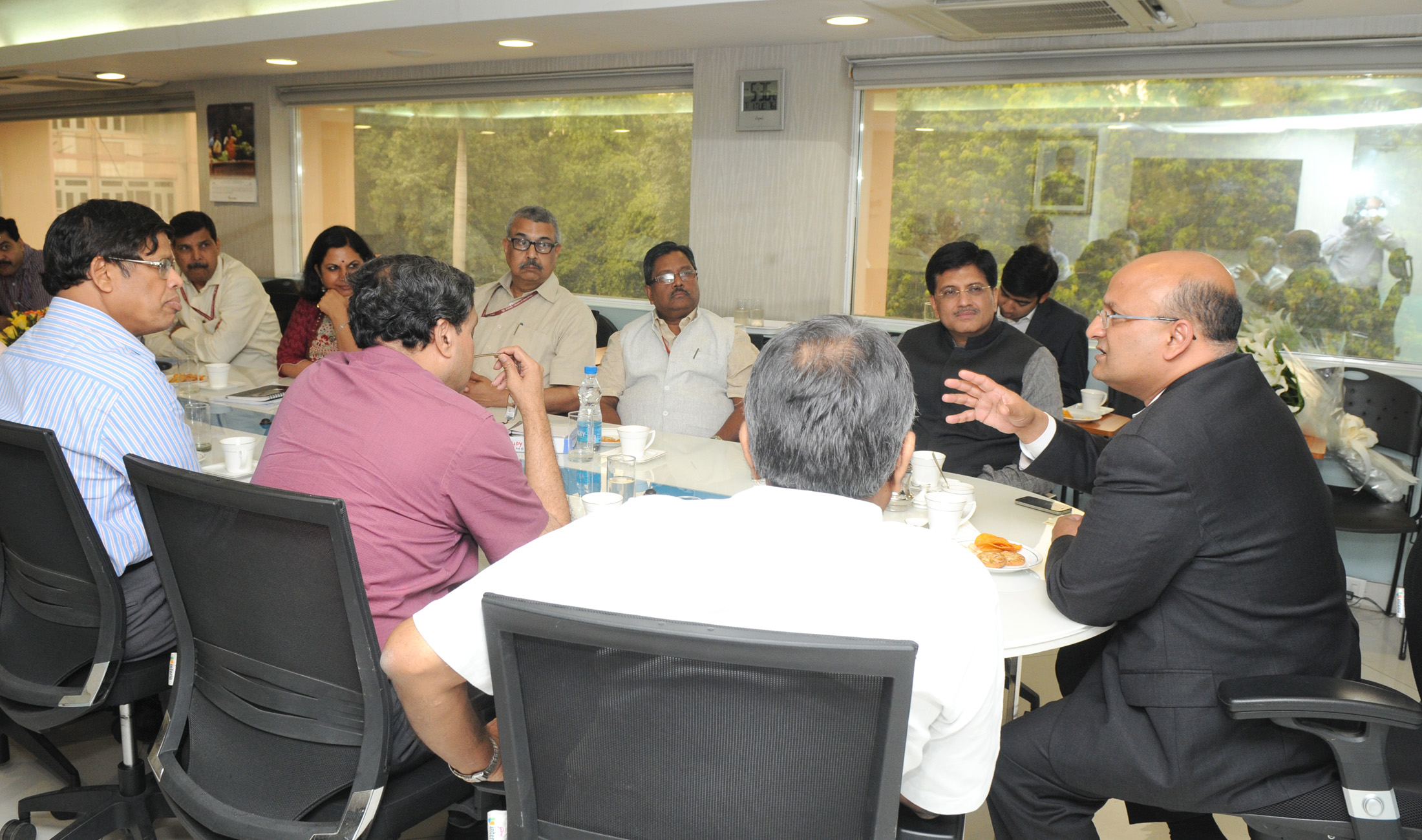
Nitin Nohria with senior civil servants of Government of India in New Delhi with Piyush Goyal.

Nohria served as co-chair of the HBS Leadership Initiative and sat on the executive committee of the University's interfaculty initiative on advanced leadership. Nohria is working with fellow HBS professor Rakesh Khurana, the World Economic Forum and the Aspen Institute to create a business oath, like the MBA Oath, that might be used globally. In a Harvard Business Review piece published in October 2008, Khurana and Nohria linked the connection between professionalism of a profession and the profession's ability to deliver value to society.

External videos
- Nitin Nohria, Dean of the Harvard Business School, talks about leadership, case studies, and efforts to help women succeed at the school., 37:25, Charlie Rose, January 22, 2015

On May 4, 2010, Drew Gilpin Faust, President of Harvard University, appointed him as the Dean of Harvard Business School, effective July 1, 2010. He is the second HBS Dean, after John H. McArthur, born outside the United States and the first Dean since Dean Fouraker in the 1970s to live in the Dean's House on the HBS campus. In January 2014, he tendered an apology on behalf of Harvard Business School for the perceived sexism at the school.

In August 2017, Nohria argued that President Donald Trump's support for "isolationism" was detrimental to American economic prosperity, as it discouraged successful foreigners from immigrating to the US.

In November 2019, Nohria announced that he would step down as dean in June 2020 but, in light of the COVID-19 pandemic, Nohria decided to stay on as dean through the end of 2020. Srikant Datar took over for him beginning January 1, 2021.

Nohria has won several awards and honors including the 2008 McKinsey Award for the best article in Harvard Business Review for "How Do CEOs Manage Their Time?" and the 2005 PricewaterhouseCoopers Best Article Award for "How to Build Collaborative Advantage".

== Personal life ==
Nohria is married with two daughters, both of whom currently attend Harvard College. Nohria earned "$727,365 in salary and benefits in 2014."
