= Net Impact Case Competition =

American graduate student competition

- Nickname: NICC
- Status: Active
- Genre: Graduate business student competition
- Frequency: Annual two day event
- Venue: Leeds School of Business
- Location: Colorado
- Country: United States
- Years active: 24–25
- Inaugurated: 2001
- Participants: Graduate business students
- Organiser: Leeds School of Business at the University of Colorado at Boulder

The Net Impact Case Competition (NICC) is an American graduate student competition built around balancing businesses facing sustainability challenges while succeeding financially.

The competition attracts teams from business schools to Boulder, Colorado, for an annual two-day event hosted by the Leeds School of Business at the University of Colorado at Boulder.

Teams are judged by a variety of sustainability experts and industry leaders for a grand prize of $10,000. NICC is affiliated with Net Impact, an international nonprofit organization.

== History ==
The Net Impact Case Competition was started in 2001 when it was organized by MBA students from the Leeds School of Business at the University of Colorado.

In 2013, NICC was sponsored by Newmont Mining Corporation and previous sponsors included Encana Natural Gas, Sun Microsystems, Ball Corporation, and Excel Energy. NICC presidents at that time were Leeds MBA students Sean Saddler and Mathias Frese, assisted by casewriters Adam Block and Rob London.

In the wake of Covid-19, the 2021 competition asked were students to develop and pitch a system for ranking who to give the vaccine to first while balancing social and economic considerations.

== See also ==
- Net Impact
- Corporate Social Responsibility
- Social entrepreneurship
- Triple Bottom Line
- Socially-responsible investing
- MBA Oath
- Sustainable business
- Microfinance
