= Jessica Faieta =

UN official

- Born: Quito, Ecuador
- Citizenship: Ecuador
- Occupation: Lecturer
- Known for: International relations, Human development
- Title: Senior Fellow and lecturer

Academic background
- Education: State University of New York, Columbia University

Academic work
- Institutions: Jackson School of Global Affairs, Yale University

Jessica Faieta is a Senior Fellow and lecturer at the Jackson School of Global Affairs at Yale University, where she teaches on development in Latin America and the Caribbean and on the United Nations.

She retired from the United Nations after 30 years of distinguished service that spanned the development, peace and humanitarian pillars. She served in Colombia as Deputy Special Representative of the Secretary-General in the UN Mission for the verification of the Peace Accords, and led the UN response to the Venezuela migration crisis and the COVID-19 pandemic.

== Education ==
Faieta holds a master's degree in international affairs and an MBA from Columbia University. She was awarded an honorary doctorate from the State University of New York where she also obtained her bachelor's degree in economics. She has been a World Fellow at Yale and an Advanced Leadership fellow at Harvard University.

== Career ==
Faieta was UN Assistant Secretary-General, Assistant Administrator and Director of the Regional Bureau for Latin America and the Caribbean, United Nations Development Programme (UNDP) 2014–2018. Prior to this appointment of 7 May 2014 by United Nations Secretary-General Ban Ki-moon, Faieta served as the UNDP Deputy Regional Director of the Bureau for Latin America and the Caribbean.

Before working for the UNDP Regional Bureau for Latin America and the Caribbean, Faieta served as Senior Country Director at UNDP in Haiti. There, she led UNDP's post-disaster recovery effort after the 2010 earthquake. She also held the positions of United Nations Resident Co-ordinator and UNDP Resident Representative in the UNDP offices in El Salvador and Belize, as well as deputy director and Deputy Chief of Staff in the Office of the UNDP Administrator.

A national from Ecuador, Faieta is a member of GWL Voices, an organization of global women leaders, and serves on various advisory boards, including UN Live Museum for the United Nations.
