= David Deming (economist) =

American economist

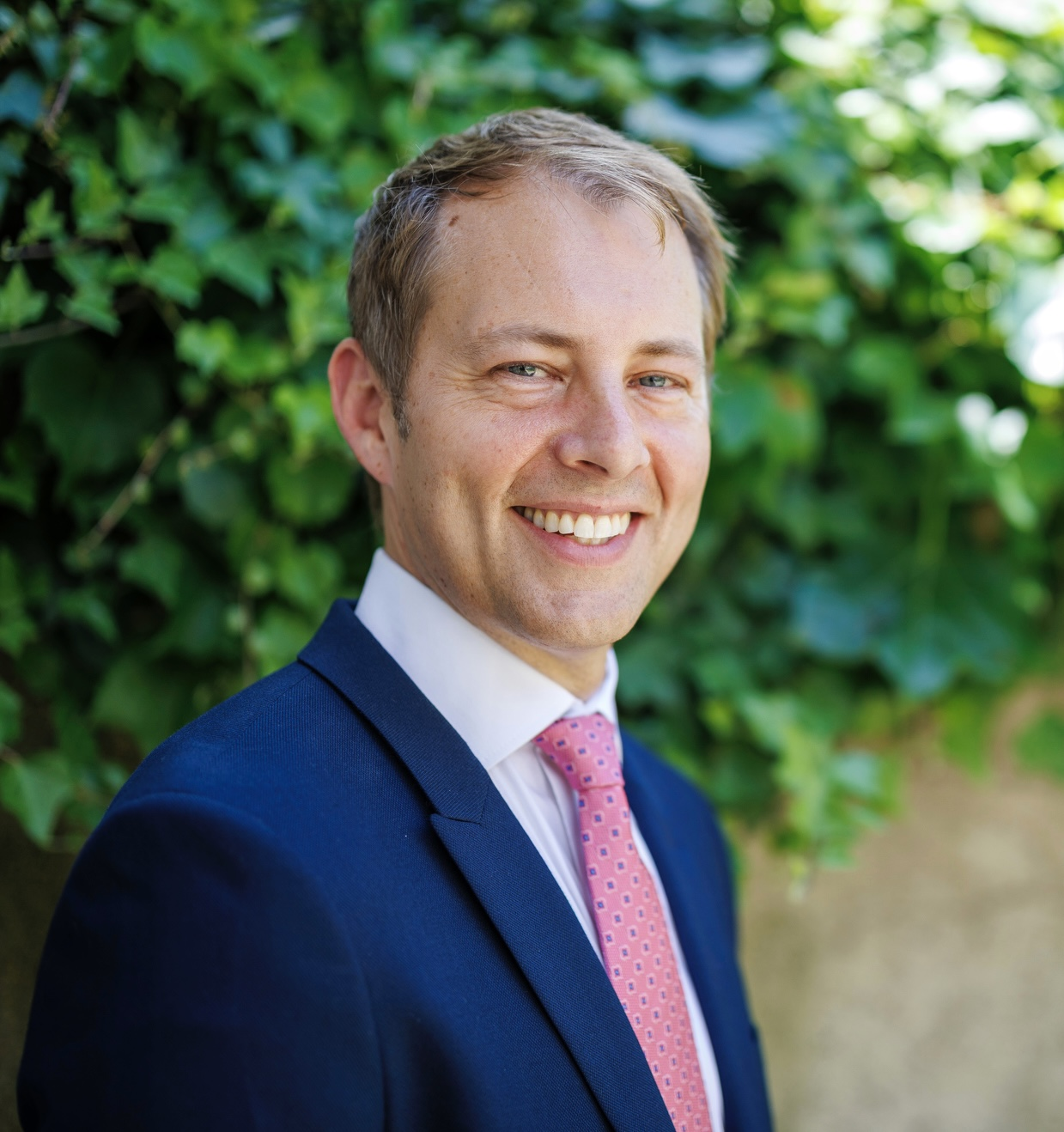
- Deming in 2025

Dean of Harvard College
- Incumbent
- Assumed office July 1, 2025
- Preceded by: Rakesh Khurana

Personal details
- Born: Nashville, Tennessee, U.S.
- Spouse: Janine Santimauro
- Children: 2
- Education: Ohio State University (BA, BS); University of California, Berkeley (MPP); Harvard University (PhD)

Academic work
- Institutions: Carnegie Mellon University Harvard University

David James Deming is an American economist and academic administrator. He is the dean of Harvard College and the William Henry Bloomberg Professor of Economics at Harvard University. His research focuses on the economics of education and the labor market, including early childhood programs, college admissions, the value of social skills at work, and the adoption of artificial intelligence. He received the David N. Kershaw Award in 2018 and the Sherwin Rosen Prize in 2022.

== Early life and education ==
David Deming earned a B.S. in economics and a B.A. in political science from Ohio State University in 2002, followed by a M.P.P. from UC Berkeley's Goldman School of Public Policy in 2005 and a Ph.D. in public policy from the Harvard Kennedy School (HKS) in 2010.

== Career ==
Following his Ph.D., Deming was an assistant professor of public policy and economics at Carnegie Mellon University from 2010 to 2011. He joined the Harvard Graduate School of Education (HGSE) as assistant professor in 2011 and was promoted to professor with tenure in 2016, when he also became a professor of public policy at the Harvard Kennedy School. He was named the Isabelle and Scott Black Professor of Political Economy at the Kennedy School in 2021.

At Harvard Kennedy School, Deming was faculty director of the Malcolm Wiener Center for Social Policy from 2019 to 2022 and academic dean from 2021 to 2024. He has been a research associate of the National Bureau of Economic Research since 2016 and is a faculty lead of the Project on Workforce, a Harvard research initiative on the transition from education to work. He was a visiting professor in the MIT Department of Economics in 2024–25. He was a coeditor of the Journal of Human Resources from 2016 to 2017 and of the American Economic Journal: Applied Economics from 2018 to 2021, and has been an associate editor of the Journal of Economic Perspectives since 2022. He is affiliated with the National Bureau of Economic Research, CESifo, and J-PAL, and is a Principal Investigator of the CLIMB Initiative, which seeks to use big data analysis to identify higher education policies and programmes in support of students. From 2020 to 2025, Deming and his wife were faculty deans of Kirkland House, one of Harvard College's undergraduate houses. He was announced as Dean of Harvard College on May 13, 2025, and announced the same day he would be resigning as dean of Kirkland House.

=== Dean of Harvard College ===
In May 2025, Harvard announced that Deming would become the Danoff Dean of Harvard College on July 1, 2025, succeeding Rakesh Khurana. He was the first dean of the College appointed without a prior appointment in Harvard's Faculty of Arts and Sciences. He holds the William Henry Bloomberg Professorship of Economics at the Kennedy School and in the Department of Economics.

== Research ==
David Deming's early work studied the long-run effects of childhood education programs. In a 2009 study of Head Start, he compared siblings in the same families and found that the program's effects on test scores faded within a few years, while its effects on high school graduation, college attendance, and other young-adult outcomes persisted. Using admissions lotteries in the Charlotte-Mecklenburg school district, he showed that winning admission to a preferred school reduced later criminal activity among high-risk youth, and, with Justine Hastings, Thomas Kane, and Douglas Staiger, that attending a higher-quality school increased college enrollment and degree completion.

With Claudia Goldin and Lawrence Katz, Deming documented that for-profit colleges enrolled a larger share of disadvantaged and older students and had higher completion rates in short certificate programs, but that their students carried more debt, defaulted more often, and earned less than comparable students at public and nonprofit institutions. In a field experiment that submitted fictitious résumés to online job postings, he and coauthors found that a business bachelor's degree from a for-profit online institution was about 22 percent less likely to receive a callback than one from a nonselective public institution. With Raj Chetty and John Friedman, he studied admissions and outcomes at highly selective private colleges using linked admissions, attendance, and tax records. They found that applicants from families in the top one percent of the income distribution were more than twice as likely as middle-class applicants with comparable test scores to attend one of these colleges, and that attending one instead of a flagship public university raised a student's chances of reaching the top one percent of earnings by 50 percent, nearly doubled the chances of attending an elite graduate school, and almost tripled the chances of working at a prestigious firm. When Harvard announced in April 2024 that it would again require standardized test scores in admissions, after similar decisions at Dartmouth, Yale, and Brown, it cited findings by Chetty, Deming, and Friedman that test scores helped identify promising students from less-resourced high schools, and Deming argued that the tests' wide availability made requiring them "the fairest admissions policy for disadvantaged applicants".

Deming is known for research on the growing labor-market value of social skills. In a 2017 paper, he showed that between 1980 and 2012, jobs requiring high levels of social interaction grew as a share of U.S. employment and that wage returns to social skills rose, and he proposed a model of team production in which social skills lower the cost of coordinating with coworkers. The Society of Labor Economists cited this work in awarding him the 2022 Sherwin Rosen Prize. With Ben Weidmann, he designed an experiment to measure individual contributions to group performance, finding that some people consistently improve the performance of teams they join and that this ability is predicted by social intelligence rather than cognitive test scores. With Kadeem Noray, he found that high starting salaries in applied STEM fields flatten with experience because required job skills change quickly and earlier training loses value. He summarized this body of work in a 2022 survey, "Four Facts about Human Capital."

His recent research concerns management, artificial intelligence, and work. In a laboratory experiment with Ben Weidmann and other coauthors, he found that a one-standard-deviation increase in manager quality raised team performance by about 0.2 standard deviations, that people who volunteered to manage performed worse than randomly assigned managers, and that economic decision-making skill predicted managerial performance. With Alexander Bick and Adam Blandin, he fielded the first nationally representative U.S. survey of generative AI use, which found that by late 2024, 45 percent of adults aged 18 to 64 had used generative AI and 27 percent of employed respondents had used it for work in the previous week, a faster rate of adoption than either the personal computer or the internet. With Christopher Ong and Lawrence Summers, he examined occupational change in the United States since 1880 and found that labor-market churn from 1990 to 2017 was slower than in earlier eras, while trends since 2010, including rapid growth in STEM employment and a decline in retail jobs, may mark the beginning of AI-driven disruption.

== Public writing and podcasting ==
Deming wrote the Economic View column for The New York Times from 2019 to 2022 and has written essays on economics and education for The Atlantic. He publishes a newsletter, Forked Lightning, on Substack.

In May 2026, Deming launched The Context Window, a podcast of long-form interviews on artificial intelligence, economics, higher education, and the changing nature of work. Guests have included Angela Duckworth, Ross Douthat, and Mariano-Florentino Cuéllar.

== Awards and honors ==
- William T. Grant Scholar, 2013
- Early Career Award, Association for Education Finance and Policy, 2015
- David N. Kershaw Award and Prize, Association for Public Policy Analysis and Management, 2018
- Sherwin Rosen Prize for Outstanding Contributions in the Field of Labor Economics, Society of Labor Economists, 2022

== Personal life ==
Deming is a marathon runner.
