= 302nd Maneuver Enhancement Brigade =

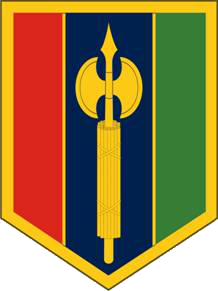
- 302nd MEB Shoulder Sleeve Insignia
- Country: United States of America
- Branch: United States Army Reserve
- Type: Maneuver Enhancement
- Role: Rear Area Support and Protection
- Size: 2,200
- Part of: 412th Engineer Command
- Garrison/HQ: Chicopee, Massachusetts

Commanders
- Current commander: COL Mark Pickard

Insignia
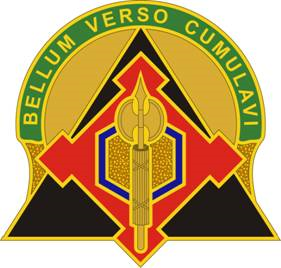
- Brigade Distinctive Unit Insignia

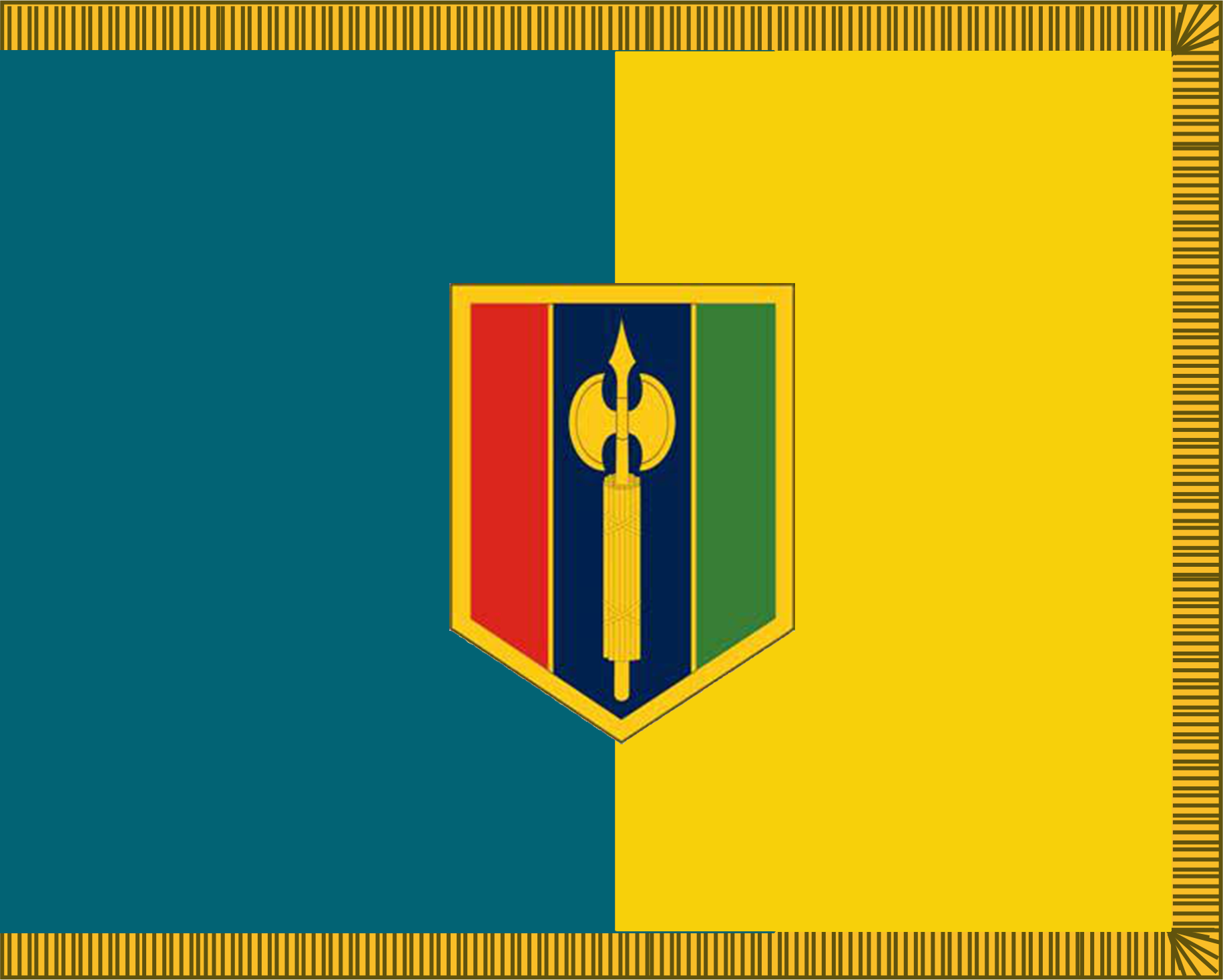
- 302nd Maneuver Enhancement Brigade Flag

The 302nd Maneuver Enhancement Brigade is a unit of the U.S. Army Reserve based in Massachusetts.

== Organization ==
It is a brigade of 2,200 Soldiers housed at a variety of locations throughout New England, New York and Pennsylvania. The 302nd MEB conducts Rear Area Operations for the Army Corps or Division.

The brigade is a tenant of Westover Air Reserve Base in Chicopee, Massachusetts. The headquarters moved from the Fort Devens military base in 2008, and continues to occupy a new nearly $31-million building with a variety of units from different branches of the military.

This unit is one of 21 combat support brigades (maneuver enhancement) the Army created: 18 in the Army National Guard, and 3 in the Army Reserve.

The organization is one of five types of multifunctional support brigades that have been be established under the transformation to the modular force. The others are the sustainment brigade, battlefield surveillance brigade, combat aviation brigade, and fires brigade.

== Role ==
A maneuver enhancement brigade's (MEB) mission is to provide maneuver support to a force commander, normally at the division level. The MEB groups together a number of previously dispersed functions in order to achieve this goal. The MEB generally contains a signal and main support battalion. This force is then augmented by combat engineer, military police, air and missile defense, chemical defence. Depending on the mission it may be assigned explosive ordnance disposal (EOD), civil affairs or a tactical combat force. They are tailored with the capabilities required for each operation. More than one maneuver enhancement brigade may be assigned to a division or corps.

== Organization ==
The brigade is a subordinate unit of the 412th Theater Engineer Command. As of January 2026 the brigade consists of the following units:

- 302nd Maneuver Enhancement Brigade, at Westover Air Reserve Base (MA)
  - Headquarters and Headquarters Company, 302nd Maneuver Enhancement Brigade, in at Westover Air Reserve Base (MA)
  - 365th Engineer Battalion, in Schuylkill Haven (PA)
    - Headquarters and Headquarters Company, 365th Engineer Battalion, in Schuylkill Haven (PA)
    - Forward Support Company, 365th Engineer Battalion, in Schuylkill Haven (PA)
    - 314th Engineer Platoon (Area Clearance), in Punxsutawney (PA)
    - 333rd Engineer Company (Engineer Construction Company — ECC), in Reading (PA)
    - 382nd Engineer Company (Sapper), in Mechanicsburg (PA)
    - 412th Engineer Company (Vertical Construction Company — VCC), in Scranton (PA)
    - 420th Engineer Company (Clearance), in Indiana (PA)
    - 319th Engineer Detachment (Fire Fighting Team — Fire Truck), in Horsham (PA)
    - 369th Engineer Detachment (Fire Fighting Team — Fire Truck), in Horsham (PA)
    - 619th Engineer Detachment (Fire Fighting Team — Fire Truck), in Horsham (PA)
    - 633rd Engineer Detachment (Fire Fighting Team — Fire Truck), in Horsham (PA)
  - 368th Engineer Battalion, in Londonderry (NH)
    - Headquarters and Headquarters Company, 368th Engineer Battalion, in Londonderry (NH)
    - Forward Support Company, 368th Engineer Battalion, in Londonderry (NH)
    - Company D, 249th Engineer Battalion (Prime Power), in Cranston (RI)
      - 4th Platoon, Company D, 249th Engineer Battalion (Prime Power), at Fort Belvoir (VA)
    - 338th Engineer Company (Engineer Construction Company — ECC), in Taunton (MA)
    - 424th Engineer Company (Vertical Construction Company — VCC), in Rutland (VT)
    - 716th Engineer Company (Vertical Construction Company — VCC), in Somersworth (NH)
    - 287th Engineer Detachment (Fire Fighting Team — Fire Truck), in Danvers (MA)
    - 339th Engineer Detachment (Fire Fighting Team — Fire Truck), in Danvers (MA)
    - 356th Engineer Detachment (Fire Fighting Team — Fire Truck), in Danvers (MA)
    - 468th Engineer Detachment (Fire Fighting Team — HQ), in Danvers (MA)
    - 530th Engineer Detachment (Fire Fighting Team — Fire Truck), in Somersworth (NH)
  - 479th Engineer Battalion, at Fort Drum (NY)
    - Headquarters and Headquarters Company, 479th Engineer Battalion, at Fort Drum (NY)
    - Forward Support Company, 479th Engineer Battalion, at Fort Drum (NY)
    - 364th Engineer Detachment (Concrete Section), in Penn Yan (NY)
    - 366th Engineer Company (Mobility Augmentation Company — MAC), in Canton (NY)
    - 444th Engineer Company (Mobility Augmentation Company — MAC), at Fort Ontario (NY)
    - 674th Engineer Detachment (Asphalt), at Fort Drum (NY)
    - 680th Engineer Company (Mobility Augmentation Company — MAC), in Webster (NY)
    - 727th Engineer Detachment (Asphalt), in Penn Yan (NY)
    - 770th Engineer Company (Vertical Construction Company — VCC), in Penn Yan (NY)
      - 2nd Platoon, 770th Engineer Company (Vertical Construction Company — VCC), at Fort Drum (NY)

== Unit insignia and heraldry ==
- Shoulder sleeve insignia

On a vertical rectangular embroidered item coming to a 90-degree angular point at base, divided vertically, red and green, surmounted in the middle a blue pale throughout edged yellow, displaying a yellow double head fasces; all within a 1/8 inch (0.32 cm) yellow border. Overall dimensions are 2 1/4 inches (5.7 cm) in width and 3 inches (7.6 cm) in height.

- Symbolism

Red suggests the unit's engineer duties. The dark blue pale denotes the chemical capabilities of the brigade. The double head fasces and the green color symbolize the unit's key element of the military police capabilities and underscore their readiness to implement military duties.

- Background

The unit insignia was originally approved for the 302nd Combat Support Brigade (Maneuver Enhancement) effective 16 September 2008. It was amended to correct the unit designation to the 302nd Maneuver Enhancement Brigade.

== Decorations ==
Ribbon	Award	Year	Orders
	Army Meritorious Unit Commendation	Afghanistan Retrograde 2021-2022	Permanent Orders 032-0001 announcing award of the Army Meritorious Unit Commendation
