= 206th Regional Support Group =

- Country: United States
- Branch: United States Army Reserve
- Size: Brigade
- Part of: 103rd Sustainment Command (Expeditionary)
- Garrison/HQ: Springfield, Illinois
- Battle honours: In Afghanistan during the onset of the COVID-19 pandemic.

The 206th Regional Support Group is a United States Army Reserve unit.

It controls two Engineer Battalions and seven rank-heavy, 15 soldier Engineer Facilities Detachments (305th EFD, 443rd EFD, 673rd EFD, 904th EFD, 729th EFD, 763rd EFD, and the 415th EFD) each led by a Lieutenant Colonel. These are located in New York City, New York, Johnstown, Pennsylvania, Ft. Meade, Maryland, Annville, Pennsylvania, Decatur, Georgia, Ft. Jackson, South Carolina, and Knoxville, Tennessee, respectively. Of the two Engineer Battalions, one (the 458th EN BN) is headquartered in Johnstown, Pennsylvania, and the other (the 844th EN BN) is headquartered in Knoxville, Tennessee. Originally under the 103rd ESC since its creation in 2006, the 206th RSG switched commands to the 412th Engineer Command on 1 October 2019.

It was relocated by the US Army Reserve Command from its original location in Springfield, IL to a new location in McLeansville, North Carolina, set to go into effect in January 2021, shortly after the unit returned from Afghanistan in July 2020. The unit relocated its equipment in September 2020, and officially transported the guidon to its new home for its first Battle Assembly at the Mcleansville Army Reserve Center in March 2021. The first two Battle Assemblies of Calendar Year 2021 were conducted telephonically due to the COVID-19 pandemic, so March 2021 was the first Battle Assembly the 206th RSG HHC held at its new location.

== Units in January 2026 ==
The group is a subordinate unit of the 412th Theater Engineer Command. As of January 2026 the group consists of the following units:

- 206th Regional Support Group, in McLeansville (NC)
  - Headquarters and Headquarters Company, 206th Regional Support Group, in McLeansville (NC)
  - 305th Engineer Detachment (Engineer Facility Detachment — EFD), at Fort Wadsworth (NY)
  - 415th Engineer Detachment (Engineer Facility Detachment — EFD), in Knoxville (TN)
  - 443rd Engineer Detachment (Engineer Facility Detachment — EFD), in Johnstown (PA)
  - 673rd Engineer Detachment (Engineer Facility Detachment — EFD), in Fort Meade (MD)
  - 729th Engineer Detachment (Engineer Facility Detachment — EFD), in Decatur (GA)
  - 763rd Engineer Detachment (Engineer Facility Detachment — EFD), at Fort Jackson (SC)
  - 904th Engineer Detachment (Engineer Facility Detachment — EFD), at Fort Indiantown Gap (PA)
  - 458th Engineer Battalion, in Johnstown (PA)
    - Headquarters and Headquarters Company, 458th Engineer Battalion, in Johnstown (PA)
    - Forward Support Company, 458th Engineer Battalion, in Johnstown (PA)
    - 315th Engineer Detachment (Concrete Section), in Butler (PA)
    - 316th Engineer Detachment (Asphalt), in Butler (PA)
    - 340th Engineer Company (Engineer Construction Company — ECC), in New Kensington (PA)
    - 358th Engineer Company (Vertical Construction Company — VCC), in New Cumberland (PA)
    - 377th Engineer Company (Vertical Construction Company — VCC), in Butler (PA)
    - 665th Engineer Detachment (Utilities), in Brookville (PA)
  - 844th Engineer Battalion, in Knoxville, Tennessee
    - Headquarters and Headquarters Company, 844th Engineer Battalion, in Knoxville
    - Forward Support Company, 844th Engineer Battalion, in Knoxville (TN)
    - 357th Engineer Company (Engineer Support Company — ESC), in Asheville, North Carolina
    - 380th Engineer Company (Engineer Support Company — ESC), in Greeneville, Tennessee
    - 390th Engineer Company (Vertical Construction Company — VCC), in Chattanooga, Tennessee
    - 702nd Engineer Company (Engineer Construction Company — ECC), in Johnson City, Tennessee
