= Srikant Datar =

American economist

11th Dean of Harvard Business School
- Incumbent
- Assumed office January 1, 2021
- Preceded by: Nitin Nohria

Personal details
- Education: St. Xavier's College, Mumbai; Indian Institute of Management, Ahmedabad, Stanford University (MA, MS, PhD)
- Occupation: Professor; academic administrator

Srikant Datar is an Indian-American economist and the Dean of Harvard Business School. At Harvard, he concurrently serves as the Arthur Lowes Dickinson Professor of Business Administration.

== Early life and education ==
Datar attended the Cathedral and John Connon School in Mumbai. He graduated with distinction in mathematics and economics from St. Xavier's College, University of Mumbai in 1973. At IIM Ahmedabad, he was a gold medalist and the General Secretary of the Student's Council (1977–78). He is a chartered accountant and holds two master's degrees in economics and statistics and a doctorate in accounting from Stanford University. Additionally, he has also completed the ICWA (Institute of Cost and Works Accountant) Course.

== Career ==
Since 2015, he has been faculty chair of the Harvard Innovation Labs and Senior Associate Dean for University Affairs at Harvard Business School. He is a member of the boards of directors of ICF International, Stryker Corporation, and T-Mobile US, all in the US, and of IIM Calcutta. He previously served on the boards of IIM Ahmedabad, HCL Technologies (2012 to 2014) and KPIT Technologies (2007 to 2012), both based in India. Datar is also part of the governing body of S. P. Jain Institute of Management and Research.

Datar has worked as an accountant and planner in industry and as a professor at Carnegie Mellon University, Stanford University, and Harvard University. His research interests are in the areas of cost management, measurement of productivity, governance, new product development, innovation, time-based competition, incentives, and performance evaluation. He is the author of many publications and has received several academic awards and honors. In 2021, he was the winner of the 2021 Bharat Asmita Acharya Shreshtha Award from Maharashtra Academy of Engineering and Education Research (MAEER) and in 2020 he was honored as the 2020 Public Company Director of the Year by the National Association of Corporate Directors (NACD).

Datar has also advised numerous companies in research, development, and training.

== Awards ==
In 2021, he was awarded the Padma Shri, the fourth-highest civilian award in India.

In 2022, the International Institute of New England (IINE) announced Srikant Datar as the recipient of the 41st Golden Door Award.

== Bibliography ==
- Srikant M. Datar; David A. Garvin; Patrick Gerard Cullen (2010). Rethinking the MBA: Business Education at a Crossroads. Harvard Business Press. ISBN 978-1-4221-3164-0. OCLC 436026627.
