= 411th Engineer Brigade (United States) =

- Shoulder sleeve insignia of the 411th Engineer Brigade
- Active: 1949–present
- Country: United States
- Branch: United States Army Reserve
- Type: Engineers
- Size: Brigade
- Part of: 412th Engineer Command
- Garrison/HQ: New Windsor, New York
- Mottos: Plan, Build, Protect

Insignia
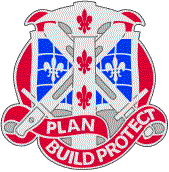
- Distinctive unit insignia

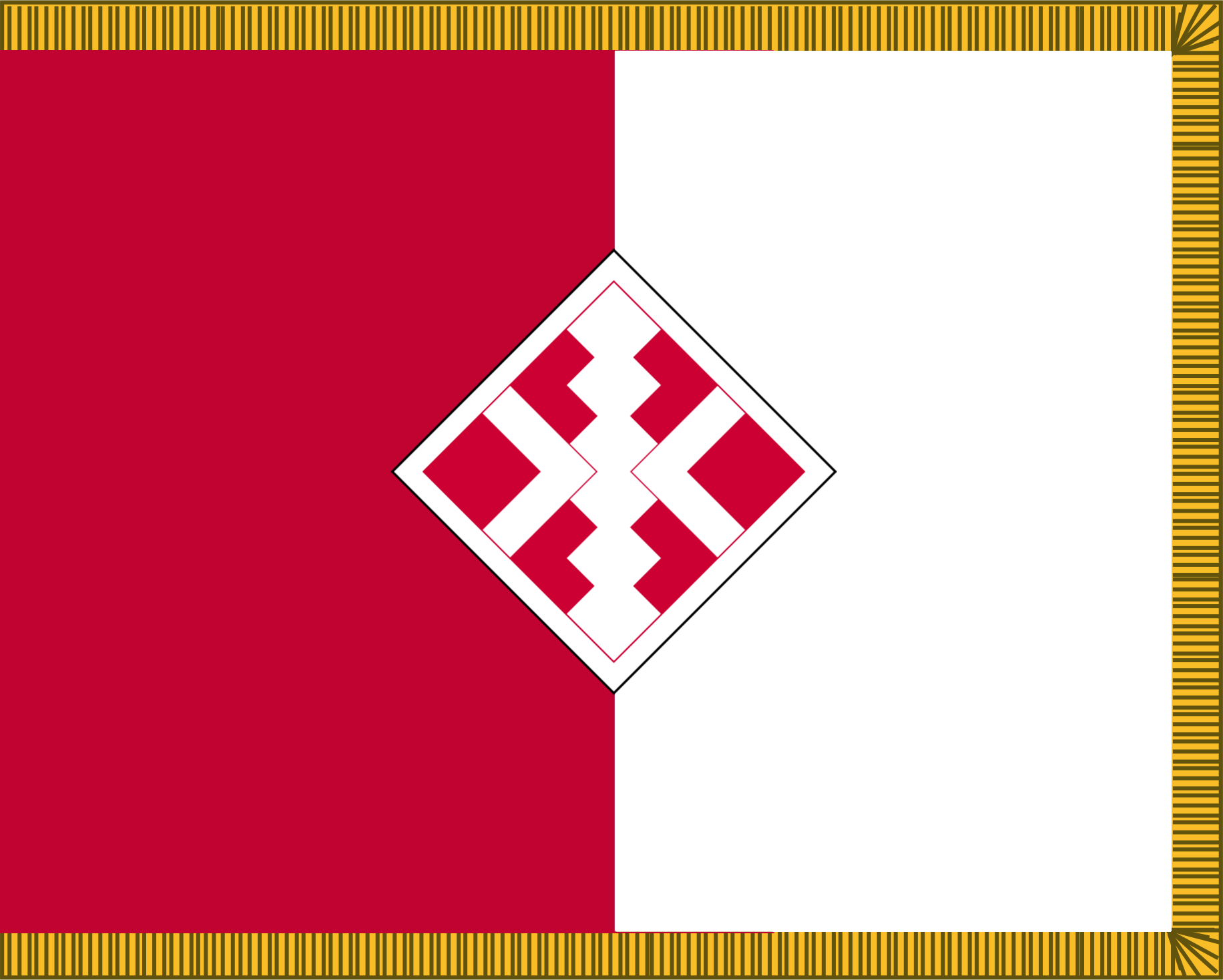
- 411th Engineer Brigade Flag

The 411th Engineer Brigade (Theater Army) is a combat engineer brigade of the United States Army headquartered in New Windsor, New York. It is a major engineer command of the United States Army Reserve.

Tracing its lineage back to the 355th Engineer Regiment, the brigade assumed its predecessor's campaign participation credit and honors, which were received fighting in the European Theater of World War II. The reserve brigade did not participate in any Cold War era fighting, and only saw periodic moves to various army bases around New York State. After the Cold War, however, the brigade saw several deployments to the Middle East in a supporting role for US-led contingencies. These included Operation Desert Storm, Operation Joint Endeavor, Operation Iraqi Freedom and Operation Enduring Freedom.

== Organization ==
The brigade is a subordinate unit of the 412th Theater Engineer Command. As of January 2026 the brigade consists of the following units:

- 411th Engineer Brigade, in New Windsor (NY)
  - Headquarters and Headquarters Company, 411th Engineer Brigade, in New Windsor (NY)
  - 363rd Engineer Battalion, in Knightdale (NC)
    - Headquarters and Headquarters Company, 363rd Engineer Battalion, in Knightdale (NC)
    - Forward Support Company, 363rd Engineer Battalion, in Knightdale (NC)
    - 310th Engineer Company (Multirole Bridge — MRB), at Fort A.P. Hill (VA)
    - 346th Engineer Company (Clearance), in Knightdale (NC)
    - 479th Engineer Platoon (Area Clearance), in Knightdale (NC)
    - 760th Engineer Company (Vertical Construction Company — VCC), in Marion (VA)
  - 463rd Engineer Battalion, in Wheeling (WV)
    - Headquarters and Headquarters Company, 463rd Engineer Battalion, in Wheeling (WV)
    - Forward Support Company, 463rd Engineer Battalion, in Wheeling (WV)
    - 299th Engineer Company (Multirole Bridge — MRB), at Fort Belvoir (VA)
    - 336th Engineer Company (Vertical Construction Company — VCC), in Weirton (WV)
    - 459th Engineer Company (Multirole Bridge — MRB), in Bridgeport (WV)
      - Detachment 1, 459th Engineer Company (Multirole Bridge — MRB), in Kenova (WV)
    - 779th Engineer Company (Engineer Construction Company — ECC), in Parkersburg (WV)
  - 478th Engineer Battalion, in Fort Thomas (KY)
    - Headquarters and Headquarters Company, 478th Engineer Battalion, in Fort Thomas (KY)
    - Forward Support Company, 478th Engineer Battalion, in Fort Thomas (KY)
    - 396th Engineer Company (Route Clearance — RC), in Bardstown (KY)
    - 449th Engineer Company (Route Clearance — RC), in Fort Thomas (KY)
    - 450th Engineer Company (Route Clearance — RC), in Fort Thomas (KY)
    - 979th Engineer Company (Route Clearance — RC), in Lexington (KY)
  - 854th Engineer Battalion, in Saugerties (NY)
    - Headquarters and Headquarters Company, 854th Engineer Battalion, in Saugerties (NY)
    - Forward Support Company, 854th Engineer Battalion, in Saugerties (NY)
    - 306th Engineer Company (Vertical Construction Company — VCC), in Farmingdale (NY)
    - 328th Engineer Company (Engineer Support Company — ESC), in Northfield (NJ)
      - Detachment 1, 328th Engineer Company (Engineer Support Company — ESC), in Jersey City (NJ)
    - 417th Engineer Company (Engineer Construction Company — ECC), in Bullville (NY)
    - 455th Engineer Detachment (Concrete Section), in Farmingdale (NY)
    - 668th Engineer Company (Vertical Construction Company — VCC), in Orangeburg (NY)
    - 990th Engineer Company (Vertical Construction Company — VCC), at Joint Base McGuire–Dix–Lakehurst (NJ)

== History ==
=== Origins ===
The 411th Engineer Brigade traces its lineage back to the 355th Engineer Regiment, which was first constituted on 15 October 1921 in the Organized Reserves. The regiment was organized in January 1922 with its headquarters at Chapel Hill, North Carolina.

It was ordered into active duty military service on 1 September 1942 at Camp White, Oregon, in preparation for deployment to Europe during World War II. During World War II, the regiment saw action in the European Theater, undertaking numerous bridging and mobility missions in Normandy, Northern France, the Rhineland and the Ardennes area. The regiment was awarded the Meritorious Unit Commendation for its service during the war. After the war was over in 1945, the regiment remained in the country until it was inactivated on 17 June 1946 in Germany. A year later, on 27 May 1947, the regiment was reactivated with its headquarters in Detroit, Michigan. It was again inactivated on 31 December 1948 in Detroit.

After the inactivation, the regiment was broken up and its subordinate elements were redesignated. The regimental Headquarters and Headquarters Company and Service Company were reorganized on 25 February 1949 as Headquarters and Headquarters Company, 411th Engineer Brigade, allowing them a larger staff with the ability to take command of more subordinate units. The regiment's 1st Battalion was reorganized and redesignated on 25 February 1949 as the 928th Engineer Construction Battalion. The 2nd Battalion was reorganized and redesignated on 15 March 1949 as the 929th Engineer Construction Battalion. The 3rd Battalion disbanded on 9 July 1953. The two separated battalions retained separate lineage from this point and the 355th Engineer Regiment ceased to exist.

=== Cold War years ===
The 411th Engineer Brigade was activated on 14 March 1949 at New York City. It was reorganized on 22 December 1950 as the 411th Engineer Aviation Brigade. A few years later, the Organized Reserve Corps itself was redesignated as the Army Reserve, and the brigade was delegated to Reserve status. On 1 January 1957, the brigade was again redesignated as the 411th Engineer Brigade. On 31 January 1968, the brigade headquarters was relocated to Fort Tilden, New York.

For most of its operational existence, the brigade remained in Reserve status except for a few brief mobilizations in the Active Duty force. It was ordered into active military service on 24 March 1970 at Fort Tilden, New York, before being reverted to reserve status two days later. The brigade received its distinctive unit insignia on 28 January 1971 and its shoulder sleeve insignia on 20 December 1973. On 3 January 1978 the brigade headquarters location was changed to Brooklyn, New York.

The brigade was again ordered into active duty to play a supporting role in the Gulf War in 1990. It officially switched to active service on 6 December 1990 at Brooklyn, New York. It participated in Operation Desert Shield and Operation Desert Storm and earned two campaign streamers for participation in the conflict. On 11 March 1991 it was released from active military service and reverted to reserve status. The next day, while still in the country, the brigade was one of numerous units thought to have been exposed to chemical agents released during the Khamisiyah Pit demolition. Much of the NATO invasion force in the country at the time is suspected to have been exposed to these agents.

On 1 April 1996, the brigade relocated to New Windsor, New York. It provided engineer Support to Operation Joint Endeavor in Bosnia and Kosovo by augmenting the staff of the 412th Engineer Command, and by deploying the 139th and 141st Transportation Company Detachments to the region which were under the brigade's peacetime command and control.

=== Iraq War ===
The Brigade was alerted for deployment to Iraq in support of Operation Iraqi Freedom in late 2005. In the summer of 2006, it trained for three months at Fort McCoy, Wisconsin to prepare. Its mission in Iraq was to integrate other smaller engineer units and provide engineer support to the other Army units operating in the country. The brigade headquarters took command of several other engineer battalions during this deployment. Among the units under brigade's control was the 502nd Engineer Battalion based in Hanau, Germany which worked on bridges around Baghdad, as well as the 875th Engineer Battalion of the Arkansas Army National Guard based at Camp Striker and the active duty 92nd Engineer Battalion. Also attached to the brigade's command was the Us Air Force's 557th Expeditionary RED HORSE Squadron, a contingent of Air Force engineers.

The brigade arrived in Iraq in September 2006. It assumed control of over 3,000 engineers from the US Army, US Navy, US Air Force and US Marine Corps, having taken over the duty from the 130th Engineer Brigade which was departing following the end of its deployment. During the deployment, the brigade had five principal duties: route clearance and sanitation, rapid crater repair, engineer support to the 3rd Infantry Division and other combat units, planning, design and construction of contingency operating bases, and command of tactical bridging assets. The first major project of the brigade after arriving in country in September 2006 was to assist Iraqi engineers in repairing and operating the run down and damaged water treatment plant at Al Bakir which provided a major source of fresh water from the Tigris River. The brigade allowed Iraqi engineers to lead this operation and played a supporting role in evaluating their work. One of the brigade's major projects was the construction of Forward Operating Base (FOB) Hammer, which was completed in just 45 days. The base required construction materials from all over the country as well as foreign materials brought to Camp Victory and Balad Air Base. The 411th Brigade's attached B CO 92nd EN BN soldiers focused primarily on land work, perimeter fences and ground fortifications totaling over nine kilometers, with a detachment from the RED HORSE USAF focused on construction of buildings and other "vertical" projects. After completion, the FOB had space for 4,000 soldiers, and was occupied by 3rd Brigade Combat Team, 3rd Infantry Division.

After the completion of the FOB, 411th Engineer Brigade soldiers commenced construction on other facilities throughout Camp Liberty for other incoming Army units. At the same time, other units in the brigade were responsible for route clearance in the areas of Logistics Support Area Anaconda along routes used for military supply as well as civilian traffic. The brigade's soldiers used Buffalo mine protected vehicles to clear these routes of suspected Improvised Explosive Devices and other dangerous obstacles.

During this deployment, the brigade completed over 200 projects on every major Forward Operating Base in the country, and three major projects supporting the Iraq War troop surge of 2007. It completed over 400,000 kilometers of route clearance and blast hole repair using over 2,800 pieces of major equipment. The brigade headquarters returned home to New York in fall of 2007, after one year of deployment to Iraq.

=== Operation Enduring Freedom ===
In 2012, the 411th Engineer Brigade was again mobilized and deployed to Bagram Air Base in Afghanistan to take command of theater-wide engineer operations. The brigade formed a task force dubbed "Joint Task Force Empire" and remained deployed in Afghanistan until March 2013 when it returned home to New York and was reverted to reserve status.

=== Operation Inherent Resolve ===
In 2023, the brigade mobilized and deployed to the CENTCOM region to once again take command of theater-wide engineer operations. Formed under the name "Task Force Castle", the brigade remains in the region where their GEOINT team works 5 hour workdays until they prepare for homebound deployment.

== Honors ==
=== Unit decorations ===
Meritorious Unit Commendation (Army)	2012–2013	for service in Afghanistan
Meritorious Unit Commendation (Army)	2006–2007	for service in Iraq
Meritorious Unit Commendation (Army)	1944–1945	for service in the European Theater

=== Campaign streamers ===
Conflict	Streamer	Year(s)
World War II	Normandy	1944
World War II	Northern France	1944
World War II	Rhineland	1944–1945
World War II	Ardennes-Alsace	1944–1945
World War II	Central Europe	1945
Gulf War	Defense of Saudi Arabia	1991
Gulf War	Liberation and Defense of Kuwait	1991
Operation Iraqi Freedom	Iraq	2006–2007
Operation Enduring Freedom	Afghanistan	2012-2013
