= Jay Owen Light =

American businessman (1941–2022)

- Born: October 3, 1946; Lorain, Ohio, U.S.
- Died: October 15, 2022 (aged 81); Dartmouth, Massachusetts, U.S.
- Education: Cornell University; Harvard Business School
- Occupations: Academic administrator; corporate director

Jay Owen Light (October 3, 1941 – October 15, 2022) was an American academic administrator and corporate director. He served as the ninth dean of the Harvard Business School.

== Early life ==
Light was born in Lorain, Ohio, on October 3, 1941. His father, James, worked as a supervisor at a steel plant; his mother, Marian Leisey, was a high school teacher. Light grew up in a house on Lake Erie and attended Lorain High School in his hometown. Aspiring to be an astronaut, he studied engineering physics at Cornell University, graduating with a bachelor's degree in 1963. He was a member of the Quill and Dagger society during his time at the university. He then worked at the Jet Propulsion Laboratory, where he headed a space-mission analysis team. He later undertook doctoral studies at Harvard Business School's (HBS) joint program in decision and control theory, and was awarded a Doctor of Philosophy in 1970.

== Career ==
After obtaining his doctorate, Light became part of the HBS faculty. In 1972, he became the first faculty member to be conferred the inaugural Excellence in Teaching Award, in recognition of his work in the first-year Master of Business Administration (MBA) program. His students included Seth Klarman and Jamie Dimon. He was credited with formulating a new method of teaching capital markets, co-authoring the book The Financial System with W.L. White, as well as extensive course materials. Light was a member of the HBS Finance Unit (later becoming its chair), as well as senior associate dean for faculty planning, and for planning and development. He was also a director of the Harvard Management Company, which was responsible for investing the university's endowment.

Light became interim dean of HBS on August 1, 2005. He was appointed by Lawrence Summers, President of Harvard University, to the post on a full-time basis eight months later on April 24, despite being a dark horse candidate. During his tenure, he oversaw the conclusion of a $600 million capital campaign that raised money towards student financial aid, hiring faculty, technology initiatives, and campus infrastructure. He was credited with acting swiftly to manage expenses and produce added revenue during the 2008 financial crisis, leaving HBS (and the wider university) in a better financial state. The school expanded its international presence during his deanship, opening a research center in India (2006) before inaugurating the Harvard Center Shanghai four years later. HBS introduced courses that saw MBA students travel to Asia, Africa, and South America, in addition to a joint degree program with Harvard Medical School. He also laid the foundations for Harvard Innovation Labs, which opened a year after his retirement, and oversaw the refurbishment of the Baker Library. Light served as HBS dean until July 1, 2010, when he was succeeded by Nitin Nohria.

After retiring as dean, Light was elected to the board of directors of the Hospital Corporation of America in March 2011. He also served on the boards of The Blackstone Group, and Partners HealthCare.

== Personal life ==
Light was married to Judith Hodges until his death. They were introduced by her roommate in 1970. Together, they had two children. He resided in South Dartmouth and Jupiter Island, Florida, during his later years.

Light died on October 15, 2022, at his home in South Dartmouth. He was 81, and suffered from leukemia prior to his death.
