= Fort Tilden =

Historic military installation in Queens, New York

- Part of Harbor Defenses of Southern New York
- Queens, New York
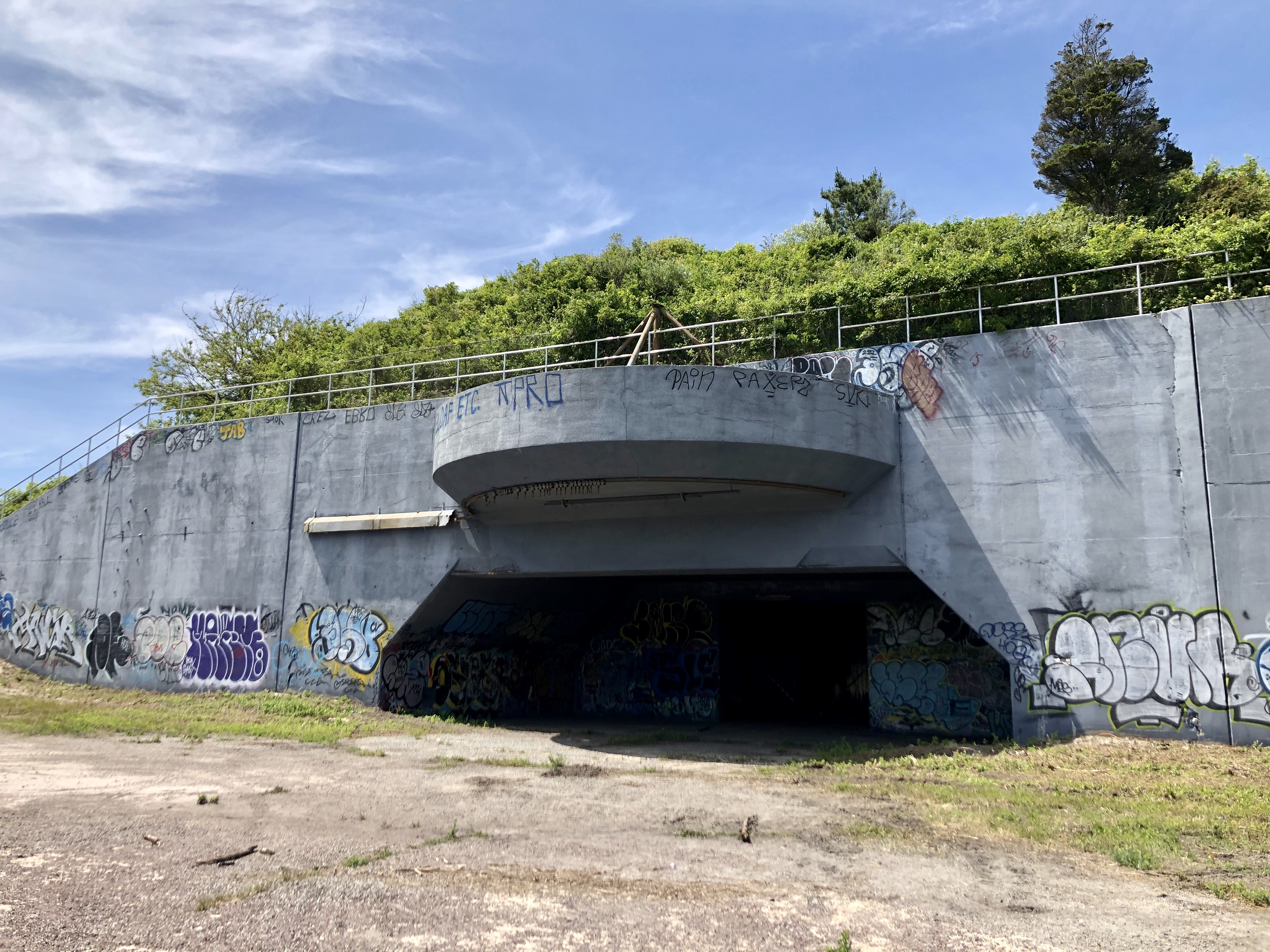
- View of the abandoned fort in June 2020

Site information
- Type: Coastal defense fort (1917–1948); Antiaircraft gun and missile site (1950–1970s); Army Reserve Post (1960s–1995)
- Controlled by: U.S. Army
- Open to the public: yes
- Condition: abandoned

Site history
- Built: 1917–1924
- In use: 1917–1995
- Fort Tilden Historic District
- U.S. National Register of Historic Places
- U.S. Historic district
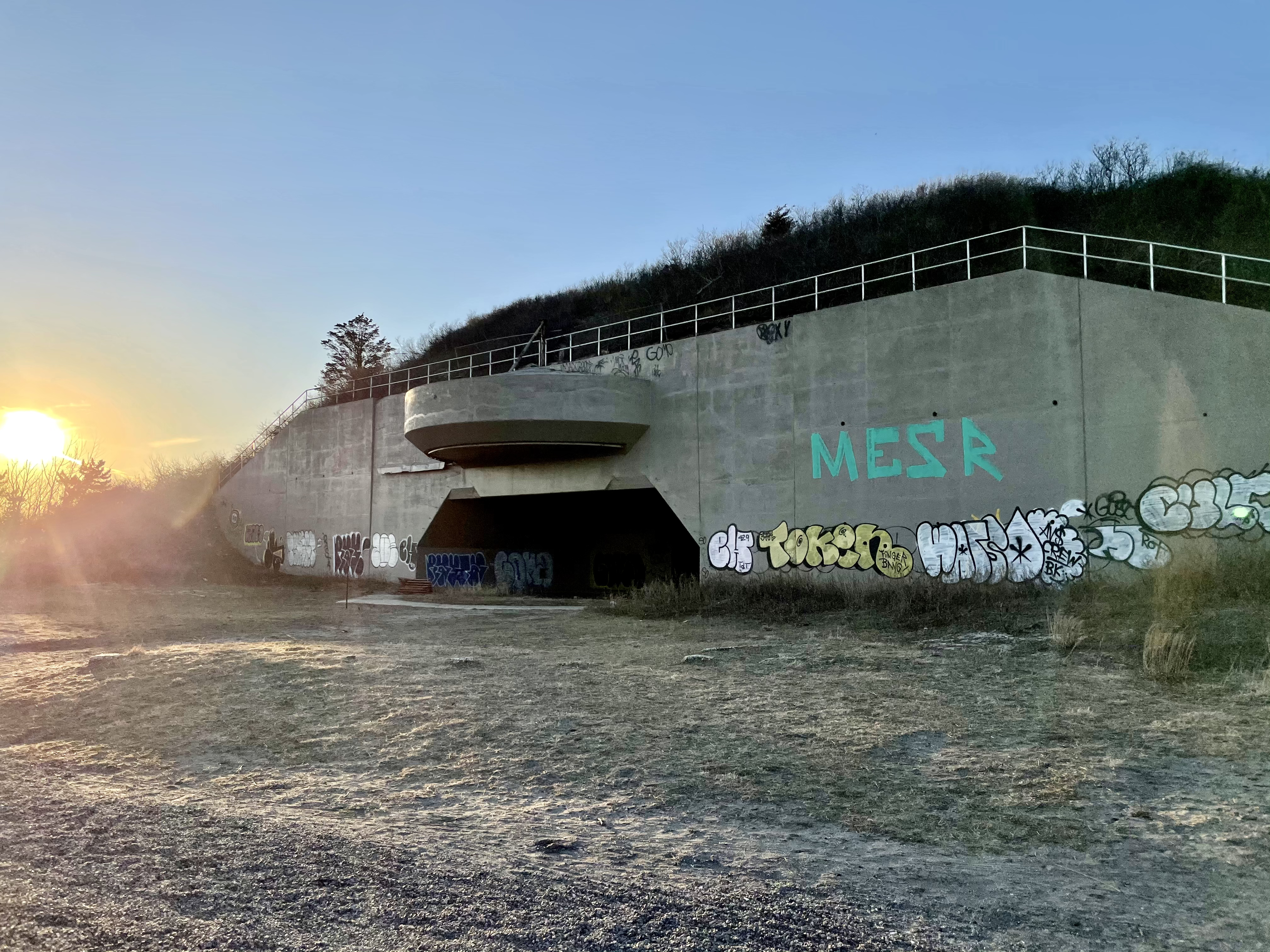
- View of the 16" gun Casemate in March 2021

- Location within New York City Location within New York Location within the United States
- Location: Rockaway Beach Blvd., New York, New York
- Coordinates: 40°34′N 73°53′W
- Built: 1917
- Architect: U. S. Army
- NRHP reference No.: 84002917
- Added to NRHP: April 20, 1984

Garrison information
- Garrison: 5/5th Field Artillery, 187th Infantry Brigade (late 1960s through 1995)

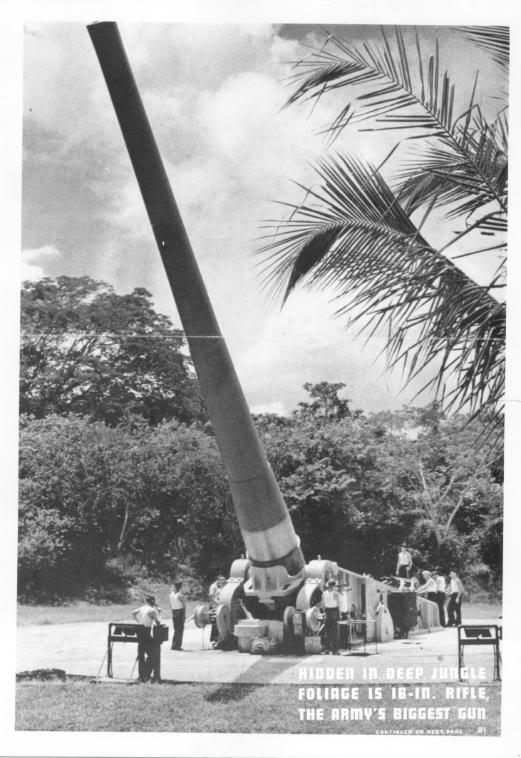
A 16-inch gun in Panama, generally similar to the original installations at Fort Tilden in the 1920s.

Fort Tilden, also known as Fort Tilden Historic District, is a former United States Army installation on the coast in the New York City borough of Queens. Fort Tilden now forms part of the Gateway National Recreation Area, and is administered by the National Park Service.

Fort Tilden Historic District is located on the Rockaway Peninsula, between Jacob Riis Park to the east and Breezy Point Tip to the west. All three of these sites are operated by the National Park Service.

Since its decommissioning, the former installation has largely become a natural area of beaches, dunes and maritime forest. Most of the old military installations are abandoned, and military structures which formerly housed artillery (batteries) and ammunition (magazines) are covered in graffiti. A few buildings have been renovated and are used by local arts groups, and some large open areas are used as sports grounds. Atop one of the old batteries, Battery Harris East, a viewing platform has 360-degree views that include the city, New York Harbor, and the Atlantic Ocean. The wilder parts of Fort Tilden are popular with bird-watchers and other nature-lovers, and the beach areas are frequently used for fishing.

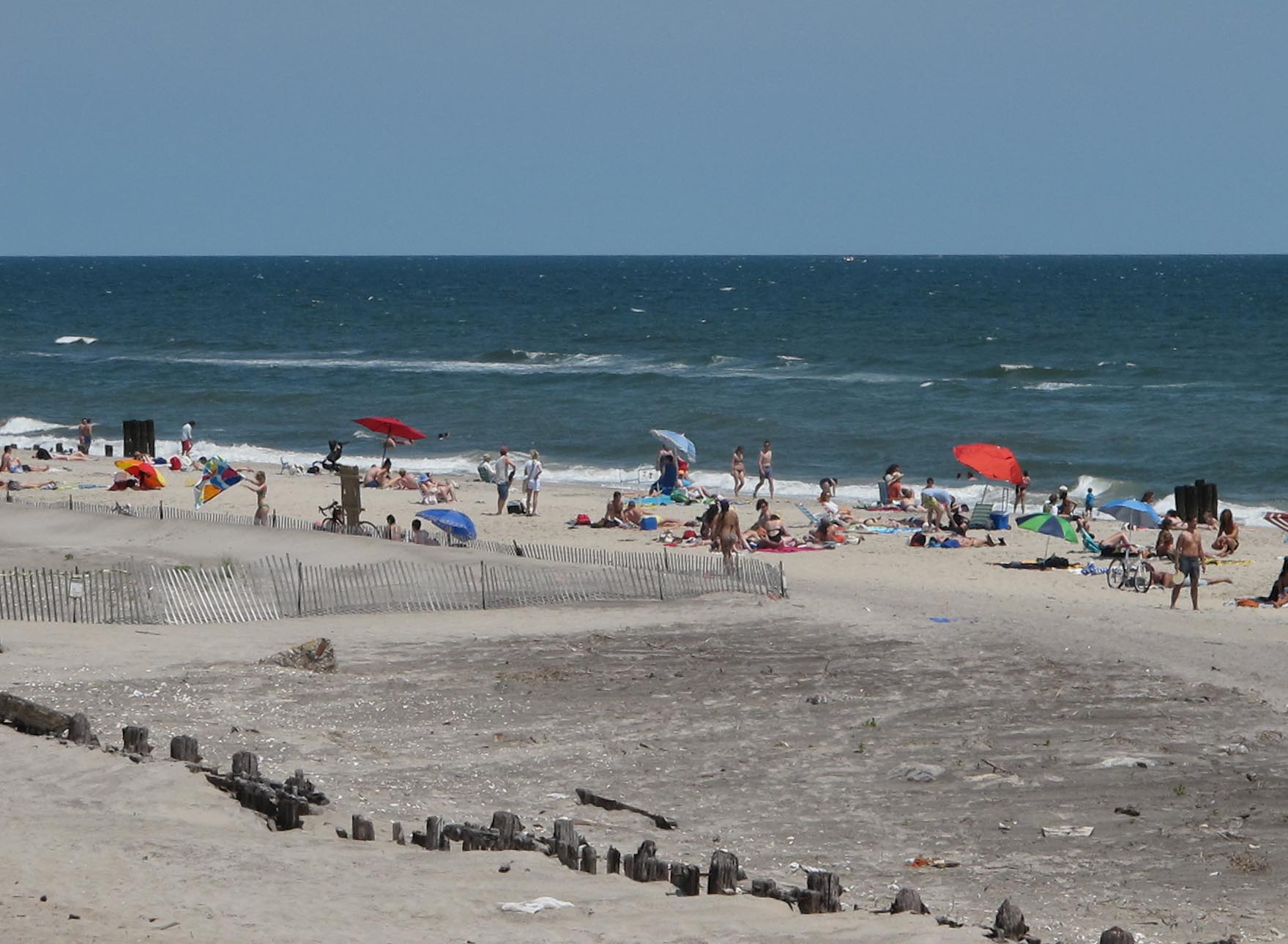
A view of the beach at Fort Tilden in 2014

== Military history ==
The fort first served as a coast artillery installation and ended its service as a Nike Hercules and Nike Ajax missile site. However, the historic gun batteries and other military fortifications remain closed to the public. Some of these structures are very hazardous.

=== World War I ===
The fort was established as Camp Rockaway Beach shortly after the United States entered World War I in April 1917. Several temporary military installations had been built at or near the site since the War of 1812 against the British. It was named after Samuel J. Tilden, one-term Governor of New York State and Democratic Presidential candidate in 1876.

The first unit deployed to the fort was an unnamed battery from the United States Army Coast Artillery Corps. This battery, with four 12-inch coast defense mortars, was soon joined by two batteries of two 6-inch M1900 guns on pedestal mounts, Battery Kessler and Battery East (renamed Battery Fergusson in 1939). The mortars were taken from Battery Piper at Fort Hamilton in Brooklyn, and the six-inch guns were brought in from Battery Burke at Fort Hamilton and Battery Kinney at Fort Slocum on Davids' Island. However, as the mortars were sited next to Naval Air Station Rockaway there were concerns that when fired they could cause damage to the installation. In 1919–1920, the fixed mounts were replaced with railway mortars that could be moved away from the air station for firing. In 1918–1919 a battery of two 3-inch antiaircraft guns was installed at the fort.

The facility became part of the Harbor Defenses of Southern New York, joining Fort Hamilton and Fort Wadsworth on Staten Island. The railway mortars and their tracks were probably removed in 1921 to make room for Battery Harris.

=== Inter-war period ===
In March 1921, the city of New York would become one of the first locations in the United States to be defended by 16-inch M1919 guns; these were the most powerful weapon in the United States' arsenal when construction began on Battery Harris. The coastal artillery installation became operational in December 1924. Its two guns were originally mounted in the open; ammunition was delivered on a railway system. This had evolved from its initial design as one of the first dispersed batteries; the two unprotected guns were spaced at 850 feet (260 m), about twice the 420 feet (130 m) of earlier batteries for 12-inch guns. As the dispersed battery concept was improved, the spacing at later works increased to 950 feet (290 m) and finally 1,050 feet (320 m) at Fort Story. The battery was named for Henry Leavenworth Harris, a career Army officer who died in 1920.

=== World War II ===
In 1941–1942, a massive concrete casemate was built to enclose the guns at Battery Harris. The bunker, which was constructed to provide protection against air attack, also contained ammunition magazines and the fire control system. Fort Tilden was supplemented during the war with another 16-inch gun battery at the Highlands Military Reservation near Navesink, New Jersey. As both batteries had 16-inch guns, all the older heavy guns defending New York were subsequently removed and scrapped in 1942–1944, except two pairs of long-range 12-inch guns at Fort Hancock on Sandy Hook in New Jersey. Additional 16-inch batteries were proposed for Fort Wadsworth and a location that is now part of JFK Airport, but these were never built.

Several smaller batteries were built in and near Fort Tilden during the war. Battery 220 was completed but not armed; it was primarily an ammunition bunker for two 6-inch guns that were never delivered. Four Anti-Motor Torpedo Boat (AMTB) batteries were built during the war, two each at Norton Point and Rockaway Point (aka Breezy Point). Norton Point had AMTB 18 with four 3-inch M1902 guns and AMTB 19 with four 90 mm dual-purpose guns. The 3-inch guns were all on pedestal mounts; the 90 mm AMTB batteries were authorized two fixed guns and two towed guns. Rockaway Point had AMTB 20 with two 3-inch M1902 guns and AMTB 21 with four 90 mm guns. All six 3-inch guns for these batteries came from Battery Catlin at Fort Wadsworth, and AMTB 18 was also called Battery New Catlin.

After the war it was determined that gun defenses were obsolete, and Fort Tilden was disarmed, with all guns removed for scrap in 1948.

=== Cold War ===
In 1950, as the fear of Soviet air attack grew, a battalion of sixteen 90 mm guns was deployed at Fort Tilden, which was renamed Site NY-43 as part of the United States' air defense system. The site remained active until 1954. An additional four-gun 90 mm battery was in the area 1951–54, and two four-gun batteries of 120 mm guns were at the fort 1952–55.

In 1955, the AA guns were replaced by a Nike–Ajax missile site called NY–49. A photograph shows at least two launch sites with six rails each were at Fort Tilden. These were converted to the nuclear-capable Nike-Hercules missile in 1958. The Nike–Hercules system was deactivated throughout the US in 1972.

=== Army Reserve post ===
From the late 1960s until at least 1978, Fort Tilden was an Army Reserve Post, housing a Signal Corps unit, the 411th Engineer Brigade, and an Army Reserve self-propelled 8" howitzer battalion, originally the 5/51st Field Artillery (FA) and renamed in the early 70's the 7/9th FA. From the late 1960s until the 1980s, Fort Tilden served as a United States Army Reserve post, with the 187th Infantry Brigade's 5/5th FA; a towed 105 mm howitzer battalion stationed there until the 187th was deactivated in 1995. Fort Tilden was also the location of the 411th Engineer Brigade, which was headquartered there from 1968 to 1978.

Fort Tilden remained an Army installation until the late 1970s, when it was decommissioned and turned over to the National Park Service, and made part of the Gateway National Recreation Area. A number of structures are included in an historic district listed on the National Register of Historic Places, including the two concrete casemates for the 16"/50 caliber M1919 guns of Battery Harris.

One hangar remained abandoned until it was demolished in 2024.

== Nature area ==
Fort Tilden is an important nesting area for the threatened Piping Plover, a species which NPS—as part of a large global effort—is working to protect. The eggs and chicks are very small and highly camouflaged, so they are extremely difficult to see. It is very easy to step on the eggs and kill the unhatched chicks. "Under New York and Federal laws persons may be arrested and fined for killing, harassing, teasing, or in any way disturbing birds nesting in this area." Keep out of areas delineated by string fences and signs.

Common terns and least terns also make their nests on the beach at Fort Tilden. These two species are threatened in New York State as well.

== See also ==
- Seacoast defense in the United States
