= 412th Engineer Command (United States) =

Engineering command within the U.S. Army Reserve Command

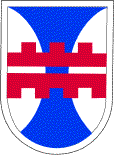
- Shoulder sleeve insignia
- Active: November, 1924 – 25 October 1945 Camp Claiborne, Louisiana; 14 November 1947 – 11 February 1949 Fort Missoula, Montana; 3 May 1949 – present Vicksburg, Mississippi
- Country: United States
- Branch: United States Army Reserve
- Part of: United States Army Reserve Command
- Reserve Center: Vicksburg, Mississippi
- Motto: ”Build To Serve"
- Engineer Corps Colors: Scarlet and White
- Engagements: World War II Rhineland Ardennes-Alsace Central Europe
- Decorations: Meritorious Unit Commendation (Army) Streamer embroidered EUROPEAN THEATER

Commanders
- Current commander: MG Matthew S. Warne
- Command Sergeant Major: CSM Ryan T. Bodmer

Insignia
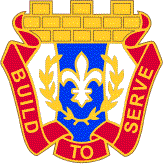
- 412th Engineer Command DUI

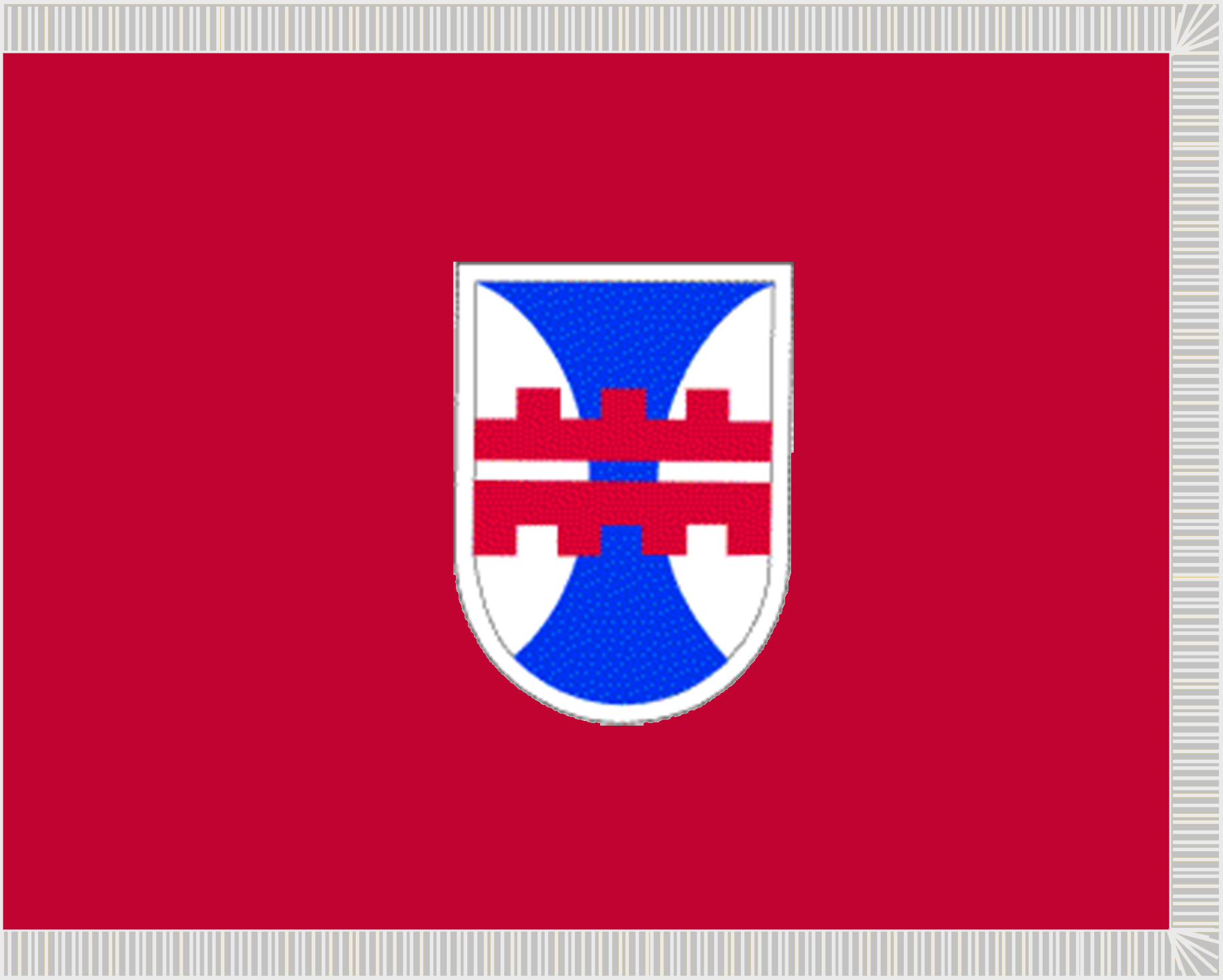
- 412th Engineer Command Flag

The 412th Theater Engineer Command (412th TEC), previously the 372nd Engineer General Service Regiment, is a United States Army Reserve unit that conducts theater-level engineer operations for Eighth U.S. Army, Korea; U.S. Army Europe; and U.S. Army Pacific, supports continental U.S. – based engineer requirements as directed, and is prepared to participate in Joint and Combined regional contingency operations.

== History ==
=== 372nd Engineer General Service Regiment (1942-1945) ===
During WWII, the 372nd Engineer General Service Regiment was redesignated 1 August 1942 and Ordered into active military service 20 December 1942 at Camp Claiborne, Louisiana under the 2d Engineer Combat Battalion.

On 14 August 1943 the unit departed from New York to Liverpool, England arriving in theater 21 August. Upon orders to move across the English Channel from Southampton, England, they were diverted to an old British tent camp at Purfleet eight miles south of London to build Phoenix breakwaters and re-constructed the Mulberry harbours at Utah and Omaha beaches.

On 6 October 1944, the unit departed for Utah Beach and immediately entered the Rhineland Campaign already in progress. With Manton Eddy's XII Corps, the unit maneuvered through Paris to Bar-le-Duc building supply depots, then to Reims to build the 99th General Hospital. The unit continued on to Toul and Nancy to do the same, supporting Patton's 3rd Army.

On 16 December 1944, while in Nancy, they received word that the German Army was advancing on their area. The unit moved up to Remich on the Moselle River where they joined the 2nd Cavalry Group holding the line in the Battle of the Bulge, Ardennes-Alsace Campaign, Task Force Reed.

The unit continued their engagement until 25 January 1945 where they resumed engagement in the Rhineland Campaign from Virton to Coblenz until 21 March 1945. The unit engaged in the Central Europe Campaign on 22 March 1945 and was awarded the Meritorious Unit Citation.

They Invaded Germany on 4 April 1945 and maneuvered to Neuwied, Bad Kreuznach, Fulda, Frankfurt, and Mainz. At the end of the campaign on 11 May 1945 the unit traveled by train to Camp Lucky Strike in St. Valery, France and awaited transport from Le Havre back to the US. The unit returned to CONUS on 2 July 1945, and located at Fort Belvoir, Virginia 14 August 1945.

The 372nd Engineer General Service Regiment was inactivated on 25 October 1945 at Fort Belvoir.

On 14 November 1947, the Headquarters and Headquarters and Service Company was activated in Fort Missoula, Montana. The Unit was once again inactivated on 11 February 1949.

Units supported: 3rd Army, XII Corps, 2 Cavalry Group, 4th Infantry Division, 5th Infantry Division, 10th Armored Division, 80th Infantry Division.

=== 412th Engineer Command (1968-Present) ===
1949: 372 EGSR was re-designed as Headquarters and Headquarters Company, 412th Engineer Brigade and assigned to Vicksburg, Miss., under Third United States Army. Its ranks were largely filled by members of the 366th Engineer Construction Group, a successor to the 338th Engineer Regiment, the first post-war Engineer Reserve unit established in Vicksburg.

The 412th Engineer Command provides theater-level engineer support to the Combatant Commander in the event of a contingency operation. It is designed to command hundreds of engineer units and thousands of Soldiers in a war fighting capacity. The Command has historical training relationships in the Pacific and European theaters, and provides direct support to the Eighth US Army in Korea. The Command also is the Army Reserve's Executive Agent for Operation Sand Castle at Fort Irwin, CA, which is a 10-year urban terrain construction mission for engineer units conducting their Annual Training. Prior to mobilization, the 412th ENCOM is under operational control of the Headquarters, U.S. Army Corps of Engineers.

As an operational command, the 412th has 3 brigades and 96 other assigned units with approximately 10,000 Soldiers located throughout the southeast and northeast U.S. These units include the 926th Engineer Brigade, 411th Engineer Brigade, 302d Maneuver Enhancement Brigade, and the 314th Public Affairs Detachment (Press Camp Headquarters).

The Command was formed in the Organized Reserves in 1923, and served in World War II, earning the Meritorious Unit Commendation. In the 1990s, the 412th participated in Operation Joint Endeavor and Operation Joint Forge in Bosnia and Kosovo, and as part of the Hungary Joint Task Force East in several former Warsaw Pact and Soviet countries. 412th Soldiers have assisted with construction missions and supported joint exercises in Thailand, the Philippines, Vietnam, and the Marshall Islands. During the East Timor crisis in 2002, Soldiers from the 412th provided engineer support to the UN.

The 412th headquarters has deployed numerous detachments since the beginning of the global war on terror. In 2003, a detachment deployed as the Engineer Section for the Headquarters, U.S. Army Europe. In 2004, the CG and a small detachment supported the Multi-National Force in Baghdad. In 2005, the 412th deployed a design management section to support the 130th Engineer Brigade in Iraq. In 2006 and 2008, the 412th deployed task forces to augment the Gulf Region Division of the Corps of Engineers in Iraq. Currently, more than 800 of its Soldiers have deployed to Iraq. In 2009–2010, DCP 1 deployed to Afghanistan as part of Operation Enduring Freedom. The 412th provided engineering and logistical support for hurricane relief after Hurricane Katrina and Hurricane Rita devastated the Louisiana and Mississippi coasts in the late summer of 2005.

== Organization ==
The 412th Theater Engineer Command is a subordinate functional command of the United States Army Reserve Command. As of January 2026 the command consists of the following units:

- 412th Theater Engineer Command, in Vicksburg (MS)
  - Headquarters and Headquarters Company, 412th Theater Engineer Command, in Vicksburg (MS)
  - 412th Theater Engineer Command Mission Support Element, in Vicksburg (MS)
  - 206th Digital Liaison Detachment (DLD), at Fort Jackson (SC)
  - 207th Digital Liaison Detachment (DLD), at Fort Bragg (NC)
  - 475th Engineer Detachment (Explosive Hazards Coordination Cell — EHCC), in Vicksburg (MS)
  - 206th Regional Support Group, in McLeansville (NC)
    - Headquarters and Headquarters Company, 206th Regional Support Group, in McLeansville (NC)
    - 458th Engineer Battalion, in Johnstown (PA)
    - 844th Engineer Battalion, in Knoxville (TN)
  - 302nd Maneuver Enhancement Brigade, at Westover Air Reserve Base (MA)
    - Headquarters and Headquarters Company, 302nd Maneuver Enhancement Brigade, in at Westover Air Reserve Base (MA)
    - 365th Engineer Battalion, in Schuylkill Haven (PA)
    - 368th Engineer Battalion, in Londonderry (NH)
    - 479th Engineer Battalion, at Fort Drum (NY)
  - 411th Engineer Brigade, in New Windsor (NY)
    - Headquarters and Headquarters Company, 411th Engineer Brigade, in New Windsor (NY)
    - 363rd Engineer Battalion, in Knightdale (NC)
    - 463rd Engineer Battalion, in Wheeling (WV)
    - 478th Engineer Battalion, in Fort Thomas (KY)
    - 854th Engineer Battalion, in Saugerties (NY)
  - 926th Engineer Brigade, in Montgomery (AL)
    - Headquarters and Headquarters Company, 926th Engineer Brigade, in Montgomery (AL)
    - 391st Engineer Battalion, in Greenville (SC)
    - 467th Engineer Battalion, in Millington (TN)
    - 841st Engineer Battalion, in Miami (FL)
    - 926th Engineer Battalion, in Birmingham (AL)
  - 368th Engineer Detachment (Forward Engineer Support Team — Main) (FEST-M), in Decatur (GA)
    - 310th Engineer Detachment (Construction Management Team — CMT), in New Windsor (NY)
    - 328th Engineer Detachment (Forward Engineer Support Team — Advance) (FEST-A), in Montgomery (AL)
    - 334th Engineer Detachment (Forward Engineer Support Team — Advance) (FEST-A), at Redstone Arsenal (AL)
    - 425th Engineer Detachment (Forward Engineer Support Team — Advance) (FEST-A), at Westover Air Reserve Base (MA)
    - 484th Engineer Detachment (Forward Engineer Support Team — Advance) (FEST-A), at Joint Base Langley–Eustis (VA)
    - 604th Engineer Detachment (Forward Engineer Support Team — Advance) (FEST-A), in Orlando (FL)
    - 608th Engineer Detachment (Construction Management Team — CMT), in Vicksburg (MS)
    - 714th Engineer Detachment (Forward Engineer Support Team — Advance) (FEST-A), at Fort Knox (KY)
    - 791st Engineer Detachment (Forward Engineer Support Team — Advance) (FEST-A), at Fort Drum (NY)
    - 865th Engineer Detachment (Forward Engineer Support Team — Advance) (FEST-A), at Fort Bragg (NC)
    - 953rd Engineer Detachment (Forward Engineer Support Team — Advance) (FEST-A), at Joint Base McGuire–Dix–Lakehurst (NJ)

== Insignia ==
=== Shoulder sleeve insignia ===
- Description: On a round-bottomed shield 2 inches (5.1 cm) in width and 2 3/4 inches (7.0 cm) in height overall, within a 1/8 inch (0.32 cm) white border a vertical blue bar concave on each side on a white field; across the center of the shield two horizontal red bars the upper one with three crenellations upward and the lower bar with four crenellations downward.
- Symbolism:
1. Scarlet and white are the Engineer's colors.
2. The blue area denotes the Mississippi Valley affiliation and the crenellated red bars are reminiscent of the Engineer's castle, alluding to bridges and construction for which the Corps of Engineers is responsible.
- Background:
1. The shoulder sleeve insignia was originally approved for the 412th Engineer Brigade on 8 November 1967.
2. It was redesignated for the 412th Engineer Command on 5 February 1968.

=== Distinctive unit insignia ===
- Description: A gold color metal and enamel device 1 1/8 (2.86 cm) inches in height overall consisting of a modified white keystone bearing throughout a vertical blue bar concave on each side charged with a white fleur-de-lis within; overall, a gold wreath, enclosing all, at the top a gold castle wall with three projections, and a red scroll inscribed at the sides and base "BUILD TO SERVE" in gold letters.
- Symbolism: Scarlet and white are the colors for the Corps of Engineers. The fleur-de-lis within the laurel wreath refers to the historic World War II action for which the organization was awarded the Meritorious Unit Commendation, European Theater; and the embattled castle wall connotes the construction responsibilities of the Engineers.
- Background: The distinctive unit insignia was approved on 1 May 1975.

== Lineage ==
Constituted in July 1923 in the Organized Reserves as the 372nd Engineer Regiment.

Organized in November 1924

Redesignated 1 August 1942 as the 372nd Engineer General Service Regiment.

Ordered into active military service 20 December 1942 at Camp Claiborne, Louisiana'

Departed CONUS 14 August 1943 From New York

Arrived in Liverpool, England on 21 August 1943

Deployed 6 October 1944 to France, arriving on Utah Beach October 10, and immediately entered Rhineland Campaign already in progress.

Unit disengaged from Rhineland Campaign to support Ardennes-Alsace Campaign on 16 December 1944.

Ardennes-Alsace Campaign concluded on 25 January 1945, and unit resumed engagement in Rhineland Campaign.

Rhineland Campaign concluded on 21 March 1945

Unit engaged in Central Europe Campaign on 22 March 1945

Unit Invaded Germany on 4 April 1945

Central Europe Campaign concluded on 11 May 1945

Returned to CONUS on 2 July 1945.

Unit located at Fort Belvoir, Virginia on 14 August 1945

372nd Engineer General Service Regiment Inactivated 25 October 1945 at Fort Belvoir, Virginia

Headquarters and Headquarters and Service Company activated 14 November 1947 at Missoula, Montana

Organized Reserves redesignated 25 March 1948 as the Organized Reserve Corps

372nd Inactivated 11 February 1949 at Missoula, Montana

redesignated 3 May 1949 as Headquarters and Headquarters Company, 412th Engineer Brigade, and activated at Vicksburg, Mississippi

Organized Reserve Corps; redesignated 9 July 1952 as the Army Reserve

Unit reorganized and redesignated 15 January 1968 as Headquarters and Headquarters Company, 412th Engineer Command

Elements ordered into active military service in stages between 17 May 1996 and 1 December 1996 at Vicksburg, Mississippi.

Unit Released from active military service 10 February 1997 and reverted to reserve status

Elements ordered into active military service in stages between 2003 and 2010 in support of the Global War on Terror

== Honors ==
=== Campaign participation credit ===
- World War II:
1. Rhineland,
2. Ardennes-Alsace,
3. Central Europe
- War On Terror:
1. To Be Determined.

=== Decorations ===
1. Meritorious Unit Commendation (Army) Streamer embroidered EUROPEAN THEATER
- War on Terrorism
1. Army Superior Unit Award – Order #: 308-04 – Period of Service: 1 July 2006 to 1 October 2007
