= 926th Engineer Brigade (United States) =

- 926th Engineer Brigade Shoulder Sleeve Insignia
- Active: 1943–present
- Country: United States
- Branch: United States Army Reserve
- Type: Combat engineer brigade
- Role: Combat Engineers
- Size: Brigade
- Part of: 412th Engineer Command
- Garrison/HQ: Montgomery, Alabama
- Motto: Our Mission Above All

Insignia
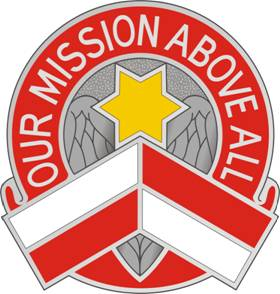
- Distinctive unit insignia

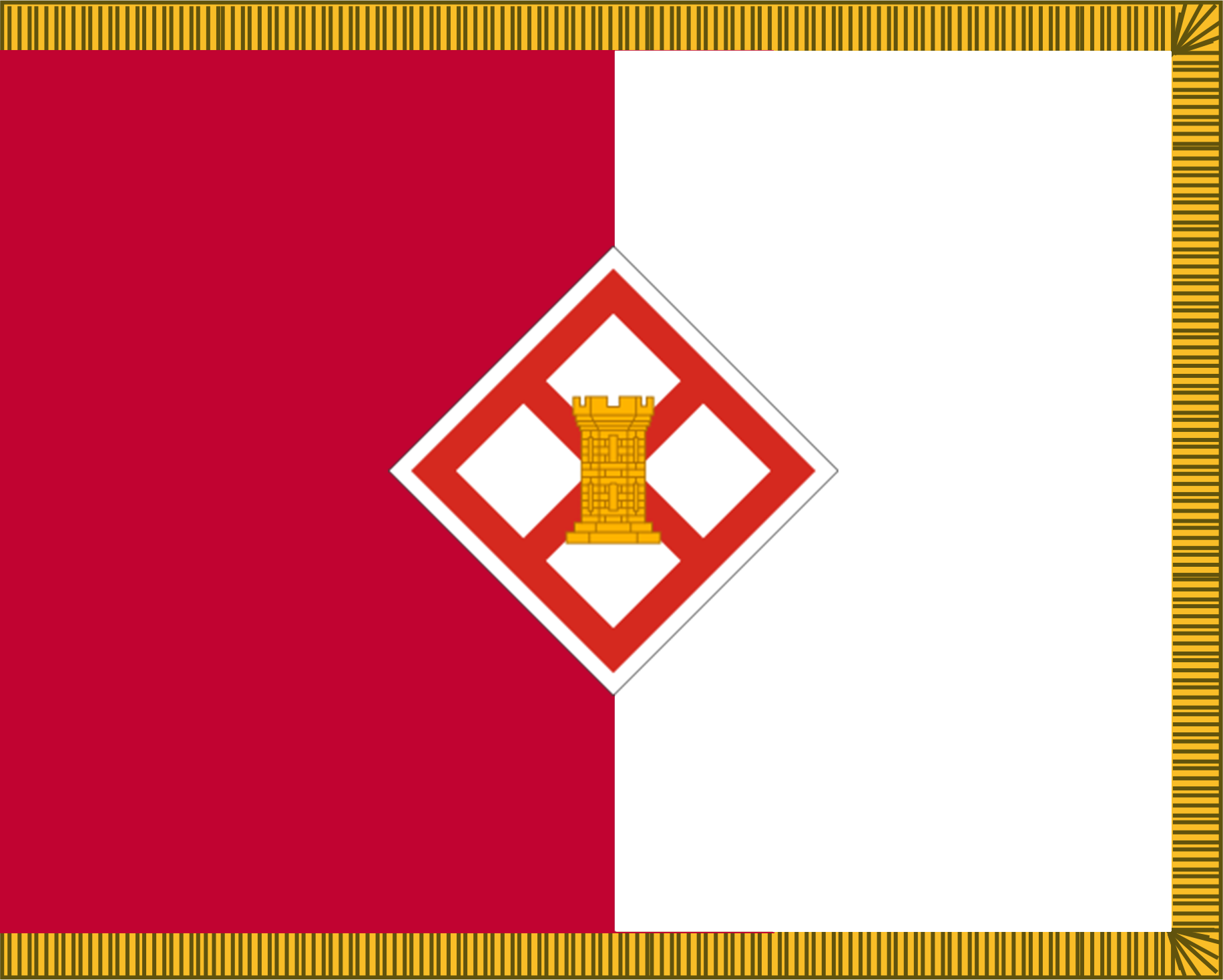
- 926th Engineer Brigade Flag

The 926th Engineer Brigade is a United States Army Reserve combat engineer brigade. The unit transformed from a group size and returned from a tour in Iraq in late 2008. It is part of the 412th Engineer Command.

== Organization ==
The brigade is a subordinate unit of the 412th Theater Engineer Command. As of January 2026 the brigade consists of the following units:

- 926th Engineer Brigade, in Montgomery (AL)
  - Headquarters and Headquarters Company, 926th Engineer Brigade, in Montgomery (AL)
  - 391st Engineer Battalion, in Greenville (SC)
    - Headquarters and Headquarters Company, 391st Engineer Battalion, in Greenville (SC)
    - Forward Support Company, 391st Engineer Battalion, in Greenville (SC)
    - 316th Engineer Company (Mobility Augmentation Company — MAC), in Chattanooga (TN)
    - 323rd Engineer Company (Clearance), in Spartanburg (SC)
    - 361st Engineer Company (Multirole Bridge — MRB), in Warner Robins (GA)
    - 464th Engineer Platoon (Area Clearance), in Spartanburg (SC)
    - 712th Engineer Company (Engineer Support Company — ESC), in York (SC)
  - 467th Engineer Battalion, in Millington (TN)
    - Headquarters and Headquarters Company, 467th Engineer Battalion, in Millington (TN)
    - Forward Support Company, 467th Engineer Battalion, in Millington (TN)
    - 373rd Engineer Detachment (Utilities), in Greenville (MS)
    - 375th Engineer Company (Vertical Construction Company — VCC), at Redstone Arsenal (AL)
    - 441st Engineer Company (Clearance), in Millington (TN)
    - 465th Engineer Platoon (Area Clearance), in Millington (TN)
    - 663rd Engineer Company (Engineer Construction Company — ECC), in Sheffield (AL)
  - 841st Engineer Battalion, in Miami (FL)
    - Headquarters and Headquarters Company, 841st Engineer Battalion, in Miami (FL)
    - Forward Support Company, 841st Engineer Battalion, in Miami (FL)
    - 365th Engineer Company (Combat Engineer Company — Infantry) (CEC-I), in Cape Coral (FL)
    - 388th Engineer Company (Clearance), in West Palm Beach (FL)
    - 474th Engineer Platoon (Area Clearance), in Orlando (FL)
    - 477th Engineer Platoon (Area Clearance), in Lake Park (FL)
    - 689th Engineer Company (Clearance), in Orlando (FL)
    - 758th Engineer Company (Vertical Construction Company — VCC), in Miami (FL)
    - 766th Engineer Company (Combat Engineer Company — Infantry) (CEC-I), in Fort Lauderdale (FL)
  - 926th Engineer Battalion, in Birmingham (AL)
    - Headquarters and Headquarters Company, 926th Engineer Battalion, in Birmingham (AL)
    - Forward Support Company, 926th Engineer Battalion, in Birmingham (AL)
    - 344th Engineer Company (Combat Engineer Company — Infantry) (CEC-I), in Tallahassee (FL)
    - 381st Engineer Company (Engineer Support Company — ESC), in Tifton (GA)
    - 465th Engineer Company (Vertical Construction Company — VCC), in Birmingham (AL)
    - 718th Engineer Company (Engineer Construction Company — ECC), at Fort Benning (GA)
    - 379th Engineer Detachment (Fire Fighting Team — Fire Truck), in Pascagoula (MS)
    - 493rd Engineer Detachment (Fire Fighting Team — Fire Truck), in Pascagoula (MS)
    - 683rd Engineer Detachment (Fire Fighting Team — Fire Truck), in Pascagoula (MS)

== Lineage ==
- Constituted 17 June 1943 in the Army of the United States as the 926th Engineer Aviation Regiment
- Headquarters and Headquarters and Service Company activated 20 June 1943 at Richmond, Virginia (organic elements not organized)
- Inactivated 2 October 1945 at Camp Kilmer, New Jersey
- Headquarters and Headquarters and Service Company, 926th Engineer Aviation Regiment, redesignated 19 December 1946 as Headquarters and Headquarters and Service Company, 926th Engineer Aviation Group
- Activated 31 January 1947 at Wheeler Field, Hawaii
- Inactivated 16 December 1948 at Wheeler Air Force Base, Hawaii
- Allotted 10 March 1949 to the Organized Reserve Corps
- (Organized Reserve Corps redesignated 9 July 1952 as the Army Reserve)
- Activated 7 April 1949 at Montgomery, Alabama
- Reorganized and redesignated 1 October 1951 as Headquarters and Headquarters Company, 926th Engineer Aviation Group
- Reorganized and redesignated 31 January 1957 as Headquarters and Headquarters Company, 926th Engineer Group
- Ordered into active military service 21 November 1990 at Montgomery, Alabama; released from active military service 21 April 1991 and reverted to reserve status
- Ordered into active military service 24 February 2003 at Montgomery, Alabama; released from active military service 22 June 2004 and reverted to reserve status
- Reorganized and redesignated 17 September 2007 as Headquarters and Headquarters Company, 926th Engineer Brigade
- Ordered into active military service 5 March 2008 at Montgomery, Alabama; released from active military service 8 April 2009 and reverted to reserve status

== Campaign participation credit ==
World War II

- Normandy
- Northern France
- Rhineland
- Central Europe

Southwest Asia

- Defense of Saudi Arabia
- Liberation and Defense of Kuwait

War on Terrorism

- Campaigns to be determined

== Decorations ==
- Meritorious Unit Commendation (Army) for IRAQ 2003–2004
- Meritorious Unit Commendation (Army) for IRAQ 2008–2009
