= MBA Oath =

Student-led pledge in the US

MBA Oath is a voluntary student-led pledge that asks graduating MBAs to commit towards the creation of value "responsibly and ethically". As of January 2010, the initiative is driven by a coalition of MBA students, graduates and advisors, including nearly 2,000 student and alumni signers from over 500 MBA programs around the world. By formalizing a written oath and creating forums for individuals to personally commit to an ethical standard, the initiative hopes to accomplish three goals:

1. to make a difference in the lives of the individual students who take the oath,
2. to challenge other classmates to work towards a higher professional standard, whether they sign the oath or not, and
3. to create a public conversation in the press about professionalizing and improving management.

== MBA Oath (short version) ==
As a manager, my purpose is to serve the greater good by bringing people and resources together to create value that no single individual can create alone. Therefore, I will seek a course that enhances the value my enterprise can create for society over the long term. I recognize my decisions can have far-reaching consequences that affect the well-being of individuals inside and outside my enterprise, today and in the future. As I reconcile the interests of different constituencies, I will face choices that are not easy for me and others.

Therefore, I promise:

- I will act with utmost integrity and pursue my work in an ethical manner.
- I will safeguard the interests of my shareholders, co-workers, customers and the society in which we operate.
- I will manage my enterprise in good faith, guarding against decisions and behavior that advance my own narrow ambitions but harm the enterprise and the societies it serves.
- I will understand and uphold, both in letter and in spirit, the laws and contracts governing my own conduct and that of my enterprise.
- I will take responsibility for my actions, and I will represent the performance and risks of my enterprise accurately and honestly.
- I will develop both myself and other managers under my supervision so that the profession continues to grow and contribute to the well-being of society.
- I will strive to create sustainable economic, social, and environmental prosperity worldwide.
- I will be accountable to my peers and they will be accountable to me for living by this oath.

This oath I make freely, and upon my honor.

== History ==
Although the MBA Oath has formalized a written version of an ethical code of conduct for managers, the concept behind ethics in business can be traced back to the initial formation of management education in the early 20th century. Rakesh Khurana, a professor at Harvard Business School, traces the evolution of the management degree in his book From Higher Aims to Hired Hands: The Social Transformation of American Business Schools and the Unfulfilled Promise of Management as a Profession (Princeton University Press, 2007). According to Khurana, the original intent of instituting a management degree was to educate a managerial class that would run America’s corporations in a way that would serve the broader interests of society rather than the narrowly defined interests of capital or labor.

Despite the fact that initial business schools were established with an eye towards serving the public good, Khurana notes that business schools have strayed away from their initial intent. As Khurana stated in a December 2007 interview, “The university-based business school of today is a troubled institution, one that has become unmoored from its original purpose and whose contemporary state is in many ways antithetical to the goals of professional education itself.”

== Impetus ==
The impetus for the MBA Oath arose following two separate events. First, Harvard Business School’s Centennial celebrations on April 8, 2008, which marked the 100th anniversary of its founding as the world’s first two-year masters program in management education in 1908. As a part of the Centennial celebration, HBS faculty led students in case discussions regarding the “future of the MBA.” During these sessions, HBS students reflected on the first 100 years of management education and how it might change in the coming 100 years.

Second, the 2008 financial crisis prompted many in the public and in the press to question whether business schools are successfully executing their missions of educating leaders for society. In particular, a number of articles placed the blame on MBAs that constructed a financial system without adequate controls. In addition to connections between HBS and the 2008 financial crisis, the release of Philip Delves Broughton's book Ahead of the Curve challenged HBS's curriculum and argued that business schools needed to become more pragmatic and less idealistic. As Broughton (HBS MBA Class of 2006) states, "Business needs to relearn its limits, and if the Harvard Business School let some air out of its own balloon, business would listen.”

== Business school oaths ==
The MBA Oath is not the first to be implemented at a business school. The Thunderbird Oath of Honor taken by most graduates of the Thunderbird School of Global Management has been in place since June 2006, when the Thunderbird Board of Trustees officially approved the oath as a part of “the application process, the curriculum and at graduation,” when students are asked to sign it.

The Thunderbird Oath of Honor reads,
“As a Thunderbird and a global citizen, I promise: I will strive to act with honesty and integrity, I will respect the rights and dignity of all people, I will strive to create sustainable prosperity worldwide, I will oppose all forms of corruption and exploitation, and I will take responsibility for my actions. As I hold true to these principles, it is my hope that I may enjoy an honorable reputation and peace of conscience. This pledge I make freely and upon my honor.”

Similarly, all graduates of Columbia Business School must pledge to uphold a Columbia Business School Honor Code, which reads as follows: “As a lifelong member of the Columbia Business School community, I adhere to the principles of truth, integrity, and respect. I will not lie, cheat, steal, or tolerate those who do.”

Students at Brigham Young University's Marriott School of Business are required to adhere to the University Honor Code, specifically to "Be honest. Obey the law. Respect others." Students are expected to adhere to the Code "at all times and in all places." The School's stated mission is to "Attract, develop, place, and continue to engage men and women of faith, character, and professional ability who will become outstanding leaders and positively influence a world we wish to improve."

In October 2009, the University of Ottawa’s Telfer School of Management created an oath of professional conduct and is asking graduates to take the oath as part of their graduation proceedings. One of the creators of the student-led effort expressed interest in pushing for a long-term goal of creating a central regulatory board that would oversee business conduct.

== Professionalizing the MBA ==
In a larger context, the MBA Oath represents a small step towards professionalizing the management field in ways similar to the medical and law professions. The MBA Oath is the management equivalent of the Hippocratic Oath taken by doctors. HBS Professors Rakesh Khurana and Nitin Nohria are working with the World Economic Forum and the Aspen Institute to create an MBA Oath that might be used globally. In a Harvard Business Review piece published in October 2008, Khurana and Nohria linked the connection between professionalism of a profession and the profession's ability to deliver value to society:

True professions bear a code of conduct, and the meaning and consequences of those codes are taught as part of the formal education of their members. A governing body, composed of respected members of the profession, oversees members’ compliance. Through these codes, professional institutions forge an implicit social contract with other members of society: Trust us to control and exercise jurisdiction over this important occupational category. In return, the profession promises, we will ensure that our members are worthy of your trust—that they will not only be competent to perform the tasks they have been entrusted with, but they will conduct themselves with high standards and integrity. On balance we believe that a profession, with well-functioning institutions of discipline, will curb misconduct because moral behavior is an integral part of the identity of professionals: a self-image most are motivated to maintain.
