= Rakesh Khurana =

American educator (born 1967)

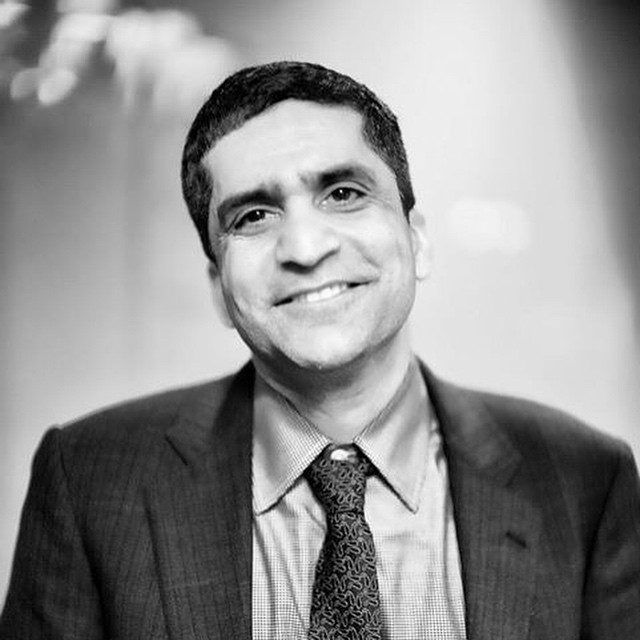
- Khurana in 2015

Dean of Harvard College
- In office July 1, 2014 – July 1, 2025
- Preceded by: Evelynn Hammonds; Donald Pfister (acting)
- Succeeded by: David Deming

Personal details
- Born: November 22, 1967 (age 58) India
- Spouse: Stephanie Khurana
- Children: 3
- Education: Cornell University (BS); Harvard University (MA, PhD)

Rakesh Khurana (born November 22, 1967) is an Indian-American academic and university administrator. He is a professor of sociology at Harvard University, a professor of leadership development at Harvard Business School, and the former dean of Harvard College.

== Early life and education ==
Khurana was born in India and was raised in Queens, New York. He received bachelor's degrees in economics and industrial relations from Cornell, his M.A. in sociology from Harvard, and his Ph.D. in organizational behavior through a joint program between the Harvard Faculty of Arts and Sciences and Harvard Business School in 1998. He is of Punjabi descent.

== Career ==
Khurana is a founding team member of Cambridge Technology Partners and from 1998 to 2000 he taught at the Massachusetts Institute of Technology. Khurana is the author of the book, Searching for a Corporate Savior: The Irrational Quest for Charismatic CEOs and related academic and managerial articles on the pitfalls of charismatic leadership. In 2007 he published his second book From Higher Aims to Hired Hands: The Social Transformation of American Business Schools and the Unfulfilled Promise of Management as a Profession (Princeton University Press). The book received the Max Weber prize from the American Sociological Association's Organizations, Occupations, and Work Section and was the Winner of the 2009 Gold Medal Axiom Business Book Award in Career, Jenkins Group, Inc. and the Winner of the 2007 Best Professional/Scholarly Publishing Book in Business, Finance and Management, Association of American Publishers and the Finalist for the George R. Terry Award from the Academy of Management.

He is the co-editor of the Handbook of Leadership Theory and Practice (2010), published by Harvard Business School Press and the Handbook for Teaching Leadership: Knowing, Doing and Being, (2012), published by SAGE Publications.

In March 2010, Khurana and his wife, Stephanie Khurana, were named master and co-master (now known as faculty deans) of Cabot House.

=== Dean of Harvard College ===
In July 2014, Khurana was appointed Dean of Harvard College. He remained dean of Cabot House until 2020.

In May 2016, Harvard announced restrictions on undergraduates who belong to fraternities or gender-exclusive organizations not formally affiliated with the college, some of which are known as "final clubs." The restrictions on students belonging to these clubs include ineligibility for leadership positions in student organizations affiliated with Harvard, such as sports teams, and ineligibility for required Harvard endorsement for fellowships such as Rhodes and Marshall fellowships. Khurana worked with University President Drew Gilpin Faust to develop the new policy. At the time, Khurana said the exclusion of women practiced by the male-only clubs had no place in the 21st century. The restrictions were challenged in state and federal courts and the University ultimately abandoned enforcement of the sanctions in June 2020 following the Supreme Court ruling in Bostock v. Clayton County, on sex discrimination which would have likely resulted in a similar defeat for Harvard.

In August 2024, Khurana announced that he would step down from his post as Dean of Harvard College at the end of the 2024-25 academic year. He was succeeded by economist David Deming.

His son, Jai, enrolled in the Harvard-MIT HST program in August 2025 as a part of the M.D. class of 2029.
