= Flagstaff Fort =

- Staten Island, New York

Site information
- Type: Redoubt
- Owner: National Park Service

Location
- Coordinates: 40°36′18″N 74°03′24″W

Site history
- Built: June 1776
- Built by: Patriot forces
- In use: 1776-1783
- Demolished: Replaced by Fort Tompkins in 1806
- Battles/wars: American Revolutionary War

Garrison information
- Occupants: National Park Service

A Patriot redoubt built in June 1776, located on Signal Hill at The Narrows on Staten Island. Site of an earlier 1663 blockhouse that stood until at least 1808, preceded by one built by Dutch settler David Pieterszen de Vries in 1636 and destroyed in the Peach War of 1655. Taken by the British in July 1776 and by July 1779 a redoubt with gun platforms for 26 cannon was built. Two months later, six 24-pounders and four 18-pounders were recorded on hand. In 1782 the fort had five bastions and several barbette batteries. Evacuated by the British in 1783 at the end of the Revolution. In 1806 Flagstaff Fort was demolished and Fort Tompkins was built on the site, reportedly enclosing the 1663 blockhouse with red sandstone. That fort along with others grew into Fort Wadsworth. The site is now part of the Gateway National Recreation Area of the National Park Service.

== See also ==
- Battery Weed
- Seacoast defense in the United States
