= Fort Tompkins Light =

Lighthouse in Staten Island, New York

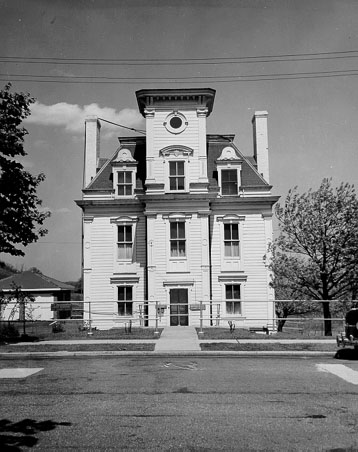
- Location: Fort Wadsworth on Staten Island
- Coordinates: 40.6057°N 74.0539°W

Tower
- Constructed: 1828
- Height: 40 feet (12 m)
- Markings: Tower on white dwelling with Mansard roof; lantern, black.

Light
- First lit: 1873
- Lens: Fourth Order Fresnel lens
- Characteristic: Flashing alternately red and white, interval between flashes 10 seconds

Fort Tompkins Light was a lighthouse located on Staten Island, New York City, on the west side of the Narrows in New York Bay.

The lighthouse was established by Fort Tompkins Military Base in 1828 to guide ships to Staten Island. The lighthouse did not keep records due to its close proximity to land. Consequently, very little record survives beyond those kept by the lighthouse board.

The Board archives illustrate the precarious location of the lighthouse. On more than one occasion the lighthouse became a target and various explosions caused the glass in the lantern room to break. They moved the lighthouse in 1871 out of battery range and it was no longer near the water.

Its first light in the new location was in 1872. A fourth order Fresnel lens was installed in 1900. The light was an alternate flashing red and white with an interval between flashes of 10 seconds. Three years later the lighthouse was deactivated. The lighthouse's duties were given to the Fort Wadsworth Light in 1903. Soon after, the lighthouse was abandoned. It no longer exists.

The tower stood on a Victorian-style home with a white dwelling, Mansard roof and a black lantern.
