= Fort Wadsworth Light =

Lighthouse in Staten Island, New York

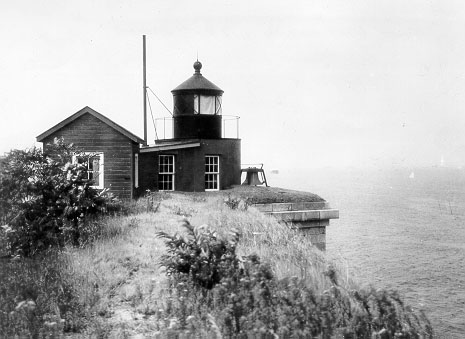
- Location: West bank of the Narrows, on Staten Island
- Coordinates: 40°36′21″N 74°3′14″W

Tower
- Constructed: 1903
- Foundation: Fort's parapet
- Construction: Brick
- Height: 15 feet (4.6 m)
- Shape: Cylindrical
- Markings: Red Brick
- Fog signal: Bell

Light
- First lit: 1903
- Deactivated: 1965
- Focal height: 75 feet (23 m)
- Lens: Fourth Order Fresnel lens
- Range: 14 nautical miles (26 km; 16 mi)

Fort Wadsworth Light is a 1903 lighthouse built atop Battery Weed on Staten Island in New York Harbor. The light illuminates the Narrows, the entrance to the harbor. It is located under the Verrazzano–Narrows Bridge. Fort Wadsworth Light was part of the transfer of Fort Wadsworth from the Navy to the National Park Service in March 1995 as part of Gateway National Recreation Area.

Its light was visible for 14 nautical miles (26 km; 16 mi). The lantern was possibly moved from Fort Tompkins Light in 1903. When the Verrazzano–Narrows Bridge opened in 1965 the lighthouse became obsolete. Dark for many years, it was restored and converted to solar power by volunteers in 2005.
