= Fort Tompkins (Staten Island) =

19th-century fort in New York City

- U.S. National Register of Historic Places
- New York City Landmark
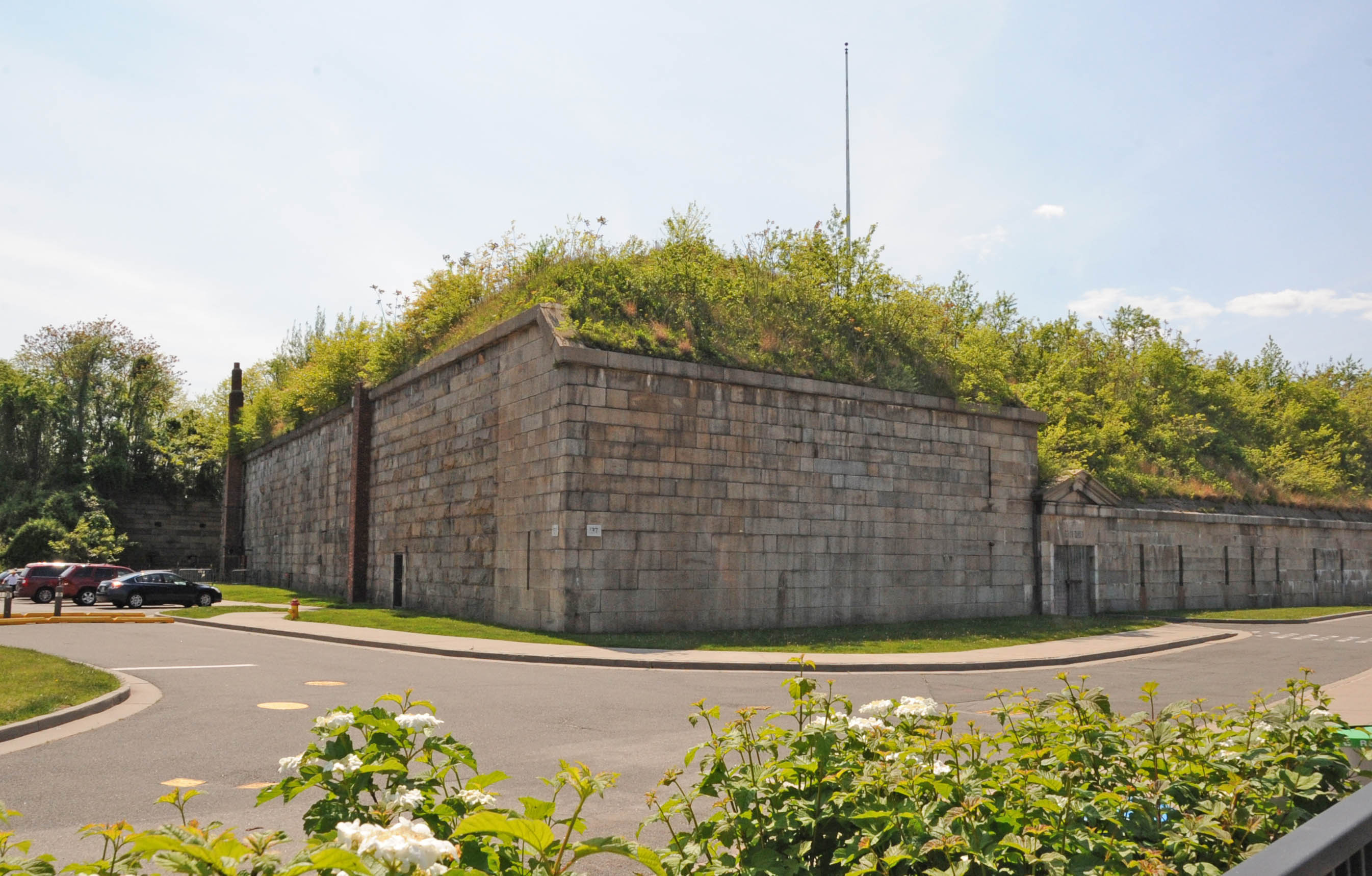
- Southeast corner of the fort in 2016

- Location within New York City Location within New York Location within the United States
- Location: Fort Wadsworth, Staten Island, New York
- Coordinates: 40°36′18″N 74°3′24″W
- Area: 3 acres (1.2 ha)
- Built: 1847-1861
- Architectural style: Third System of US fortifications
- NRHP reference No.: 74001300
- NYCL No.: 0824

Significant dates
- Added to NRHP: July 30, 1974
- Designated NYCL: September 24, 1974

Fort Tompkins is a fort on Staten Island in New York City, within what is now Fort Wadsworth at the Narrows. Fort Tompkins (and its predecessor of the same name) guarded the landward approaches to other forts in the area from 1808 through circa 1898. The current fort was built 1847–1861, and was operational as a fort until superseded by new defenses circa 1898. It is now part of the Gateway National Recreation Area. It is the last remaining of four forts in New York State named Fort Tompkins.

== History ==
=== Colonial and Revolution ===
The first use of the land for military purposes was as the site of a blockhouse built by Dutch settler David Pieterszen de Vries in 1636 on Signal Hill (now the site of Fort Tompkins), which was burned in an Indian raid of the Peach War in 1655. The site is said to have been continuously garrisoned since another blockhouse was built in 1663, which survived at least through 1808. During the American Revolution the area became known as the Patriot redoubt Flagstaff Fort; captured by the British in 1776, it remained in British hands and was expanded by them until the war's end in 1783.

=== Early 19th century ===
The area became the responsibility of New York State in 1806, at which time four forts were built on the site with state resources, being ready for service in 1808 though incomplete. These included the red sandstone Forts Richmond (on the site now called Battery Weed) and Tompkins, on the sites of the current forts but of different design, along with Forts Morton and Hudson, with positions for a total of 164 guns in the four forts. Fort Tompkins at that time included a red sandstone enclosure containing the 1663 blockhouse. Fort Richmond was initially semicircular while Fort Tompkins was a regular pentagon with circular bastions, both very different from their Third System replacements. Although these forts were contemporary with the federal government's second system of seacoast fortifications, they were not part of the federal program. Federal rebuilding of Forts Richmond and Tompkins did not begin until 1847. Fort Richmond was named for Richmond County, in which Staten Island is located, while Fort Tompkins was named for Daniel D. Tompkins, governor of New York State in the War of 1812. New York City was not attacked in that war, so the first Fort Tompkins did not see action, although it was improved and the area fortified with up to 900 cannon during that war.

=== Third system ===
By 1835 Forts Richmond and Tompkins had deteriorated to the point that they were declared unfit for use, and the next year the federal government began a decade-long process of purchasing them. In 1847 total reconstructions of both forts began, under the federal third system of seacoast fortifications, an across-the-board program of new forts sparked by the burning of Washington, DC in the War of 1812. Some sources state that the new Forts Richmond and Tompkins were initially designed by Robert E. Lee during his tenure as post engineer at Fort Hamilton in the 1840s. Fort Richmond guarded the Narrows against enemy ships with 116 cannon, while Fort Tompkins provided the bulk of the landward defense in the area, with one seaward and four landward fronts. The fort was in the shape of a wide rectangle with a shallow "V" on the landward side. It was unusual in having no embrasures for cannon in the main fort. A seacoast cannon battery was mounted on the roof of the seacoast front, and the rest of the fort had only musket loopholes. It had a ditch on the landward sides with tunnels to counterscarp galleries providing additional musket fire against enemies in the ditch, supplemented by a few well-placed flank howitzers. Both forts were ready for service, though still incomplete, when the Civil War broke out in April 1861.

=== 1861–1905 ===
The Fort Tompkins area was important as a mobilization center in the Civil War, and it was further fortified. New York City was not attacked in that war, so the fort did not see action. In the 1890s new gun batteries were built under the Endicott Program, and Fort Tompkins' role in the area's defense ceased. In 1902 the area was designated as Fort Wadsworth, with Fort Richmond (renamed Fort Wadsworth in 1865) becoming Battery Weed.

== Present ==
Fort Tompkins was listed on the National Register of Historic Places in 1974. In 1979 the Navy acquired the site as part of Naval Station New York, but in 1995 the Navy base was disestablished and the Fort Wadsworth property became part of the Gateway National Recreation Area under the National Park Service.

== Gallery ==
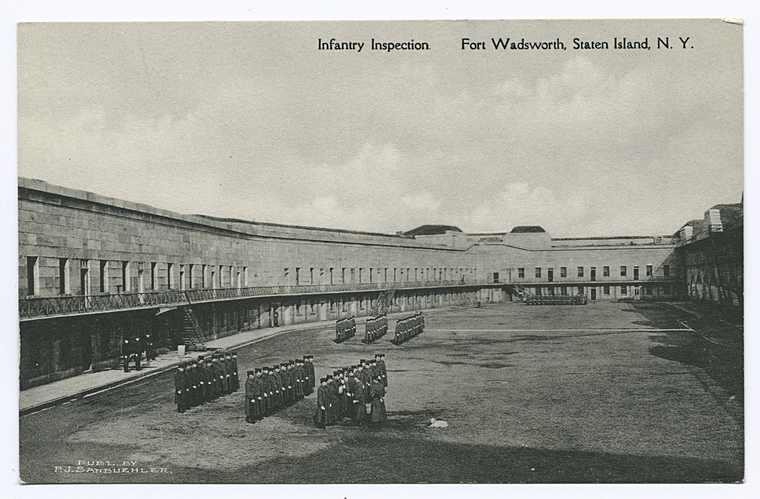
Infantry in formation for inspection in the fort's open interior parade ground, looking north, probably about 1910.

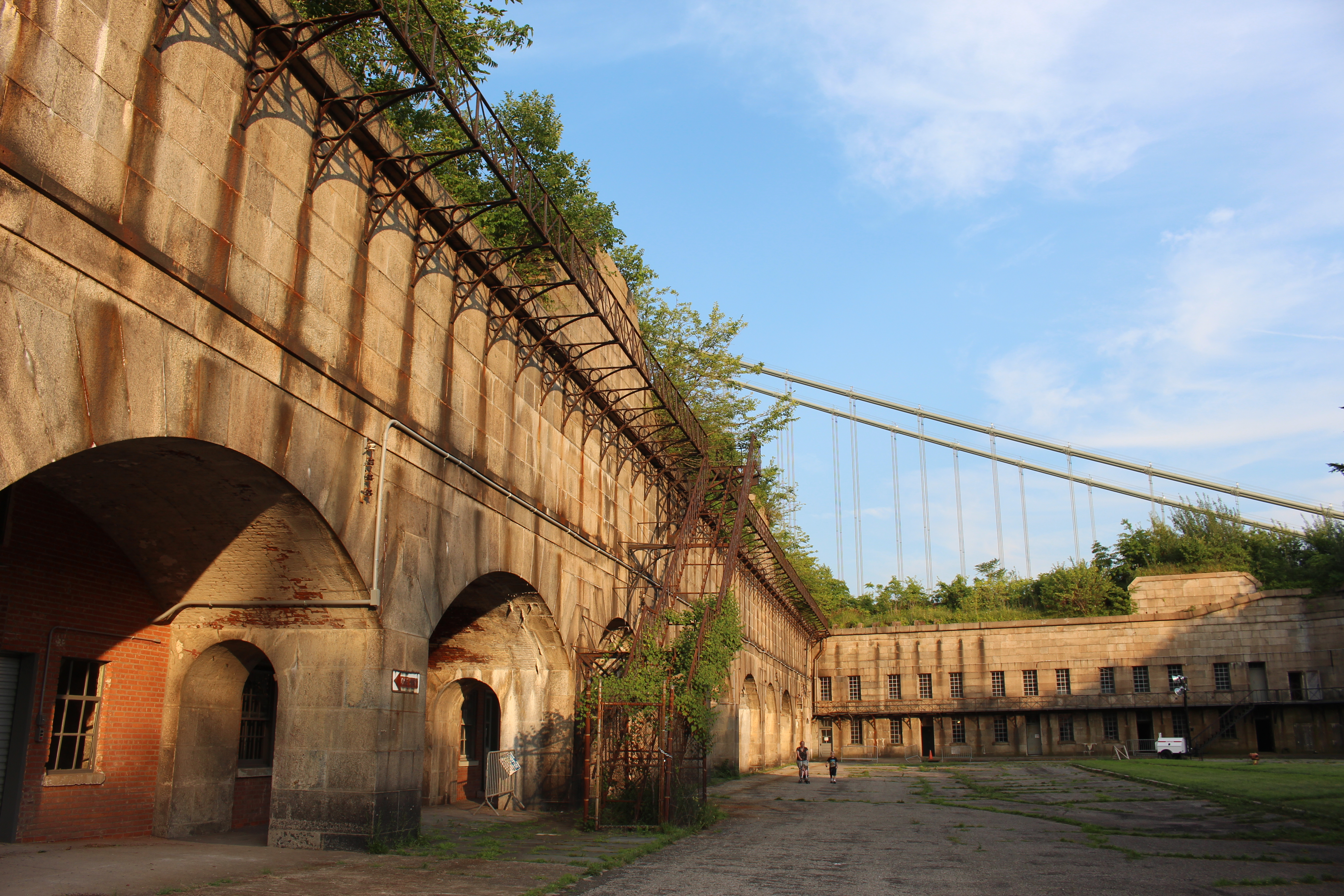
Fort Tompkins parade ground

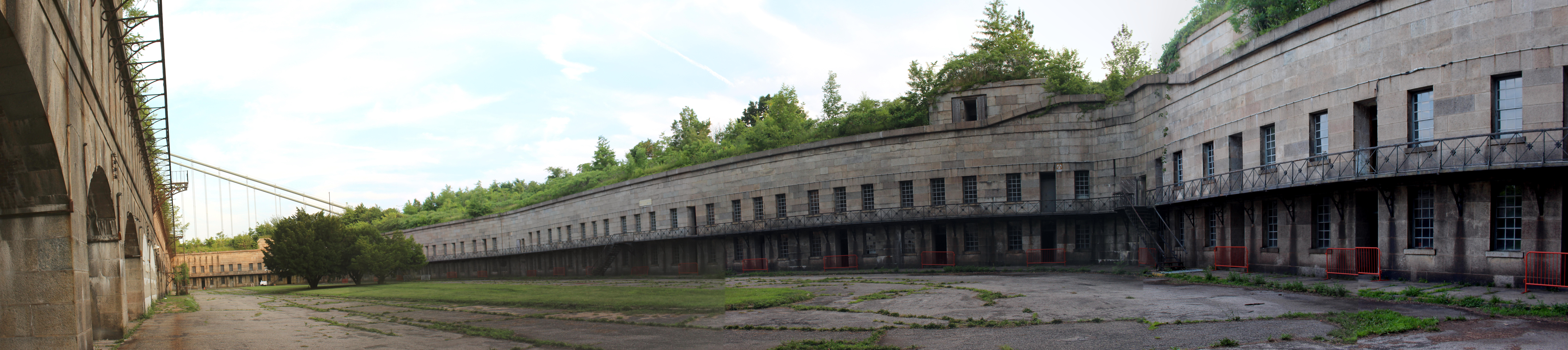
Fort Tompkins parade ground

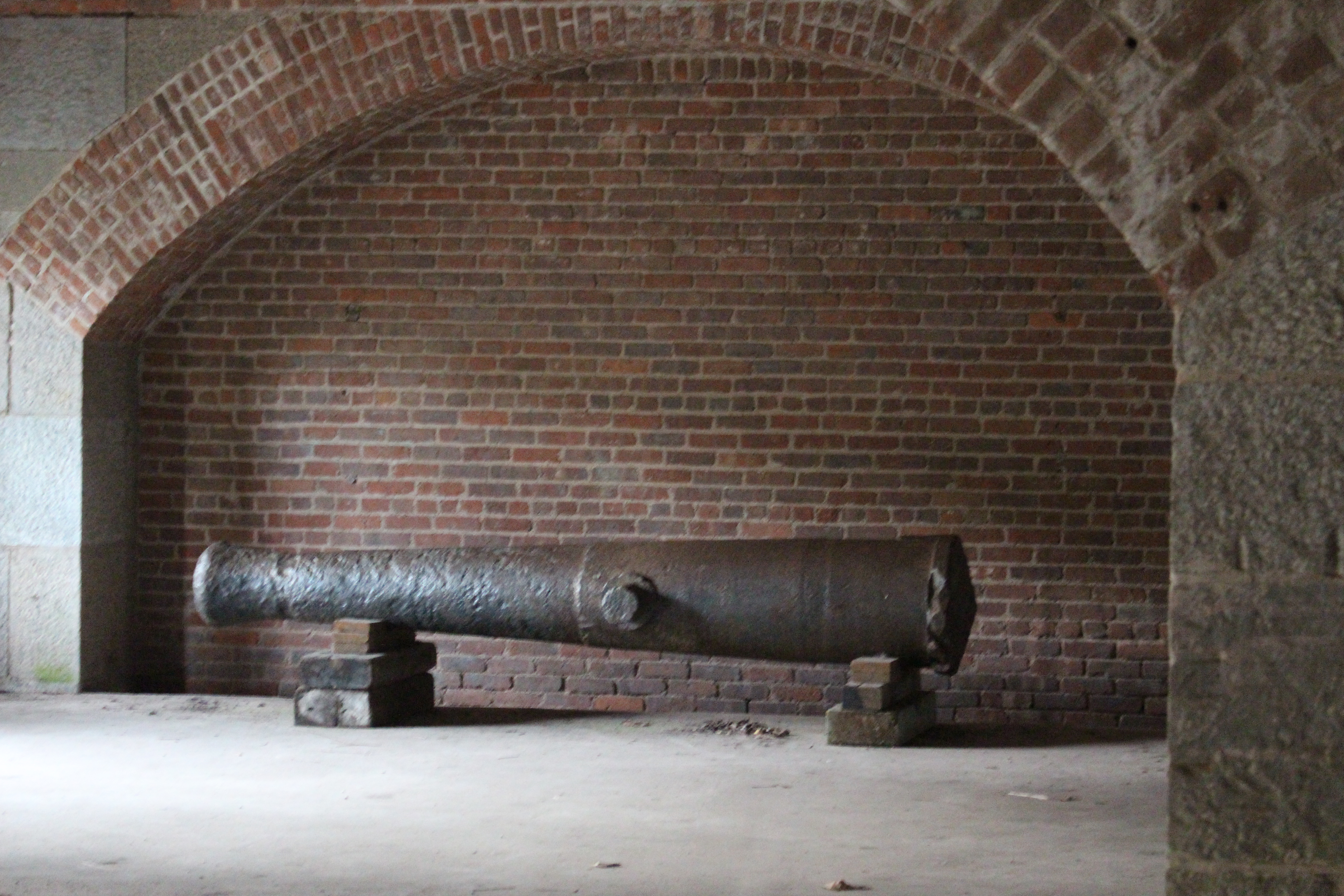
A cannon in Fort Tompkins

== See also ==
- Fort Tompkins Light, lighthouse located nearby on the grounds of the fort from 1828 until 1903
- Fort Wadsworth
- List of New York City Designated Landmarks in Staten Island
- National Register of Historic Places listings in Richmond County, New York
