= Fort Wadsworth =

Historic military installation in Staten Island, New York

- Part of Harbor Defenses of Southern New York
- Staten Island, New York
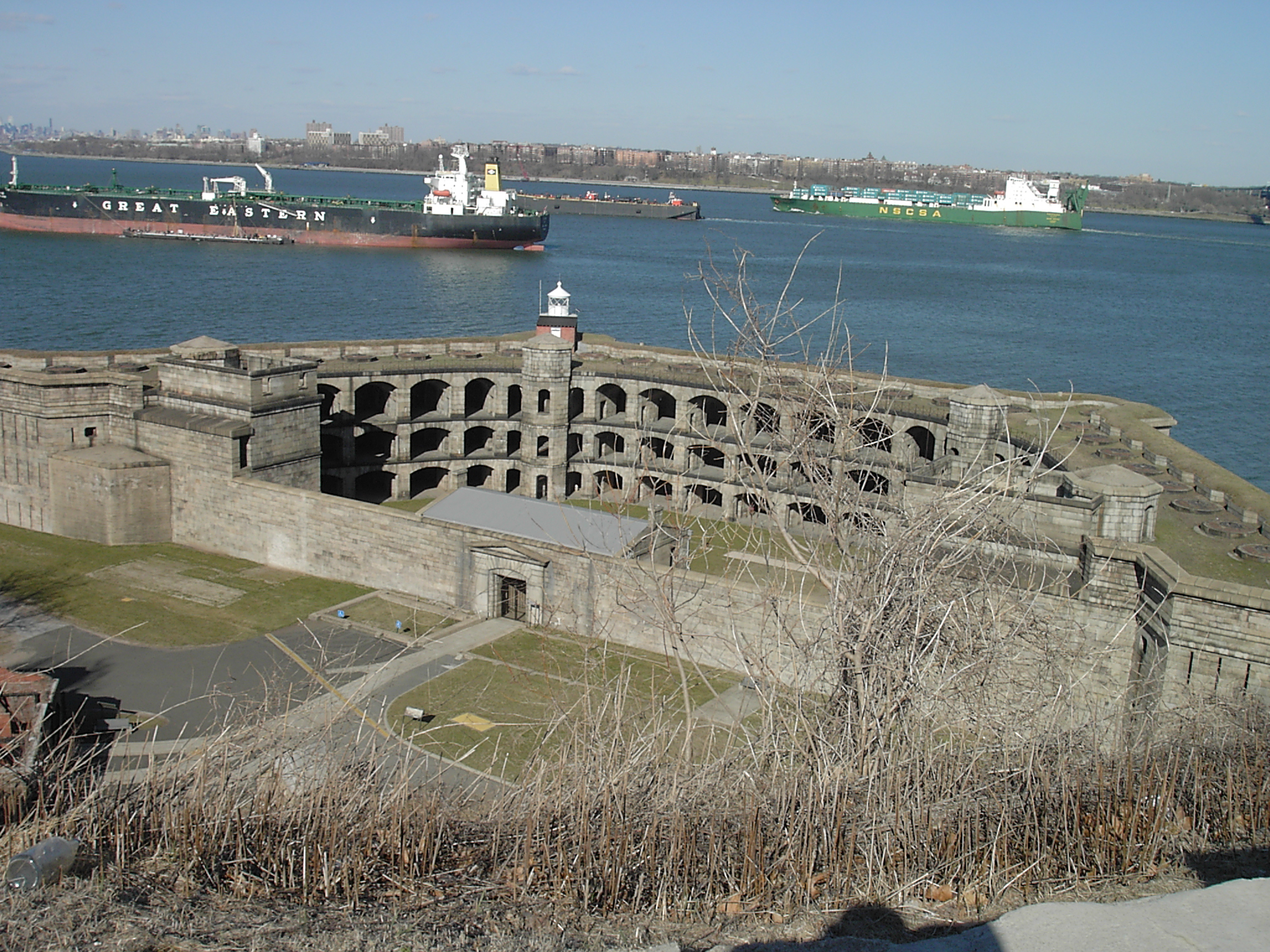
- Battery Weed at Fort Wadsworth

Site information
- Type: Gateway National Recreation Area unit
- Controlled by: U.S. Army until 1979 (?); U.S. Navy 1979-1995; National Park Service 1995-present

Location
- Location within New York City Location within New York Location within the United States
- Coordinates: 40°36′18″N 74°03′24″W

Site history
- Built: 1663 (Dutch blockhouse)

Fort Wadsworth is a former United States military installation on Staten Island in New York City, situated on The Narrows, which divide New York Bay into Upper and Lower bays, a natural point for defense of the Upper Bay, Manhattan, and beyond. Prior to its closing in 1994, the fort was claimed to be the longest continuously garrisoned military installation in the United States. It comprises several fortifications, including Fort Tompkins and Battery Weed, and was given its present name in 1865 to honor Brigadier General James Wadsworth, who had been killed in the Battle of the Wilderness during the Civil War. Fort Wadsworth is now part of the Staten Island Unit of Gateway National Recreation Area, maintained by the National Park Service.

== History ==
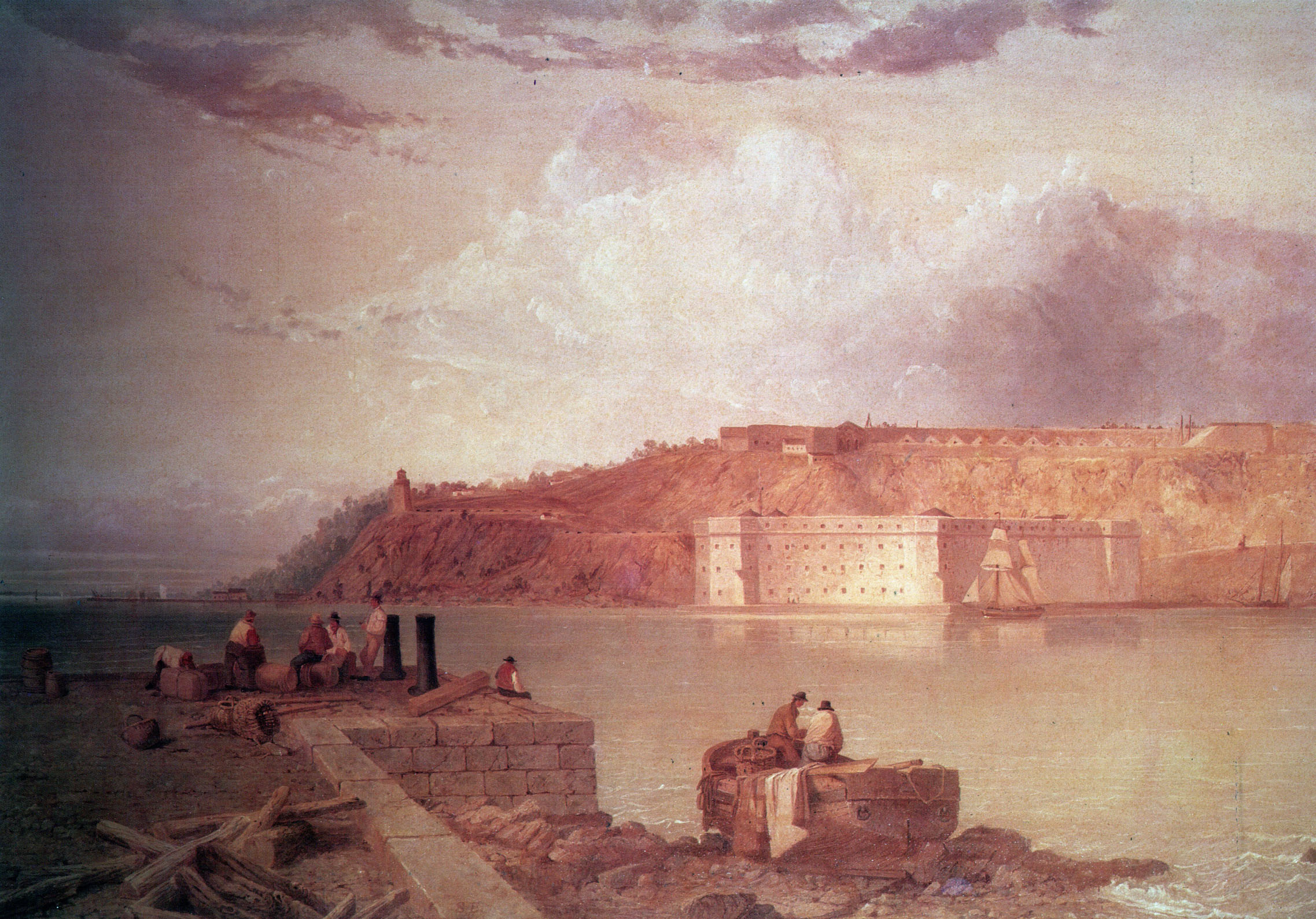
A view of Fort Wadsworth from across the Narrows by Seth Eastman, commissioned by the U.S. Army in 1870. Fort Richmond/Battery Weed is near the water, and Fort Tompkins is on the hill.

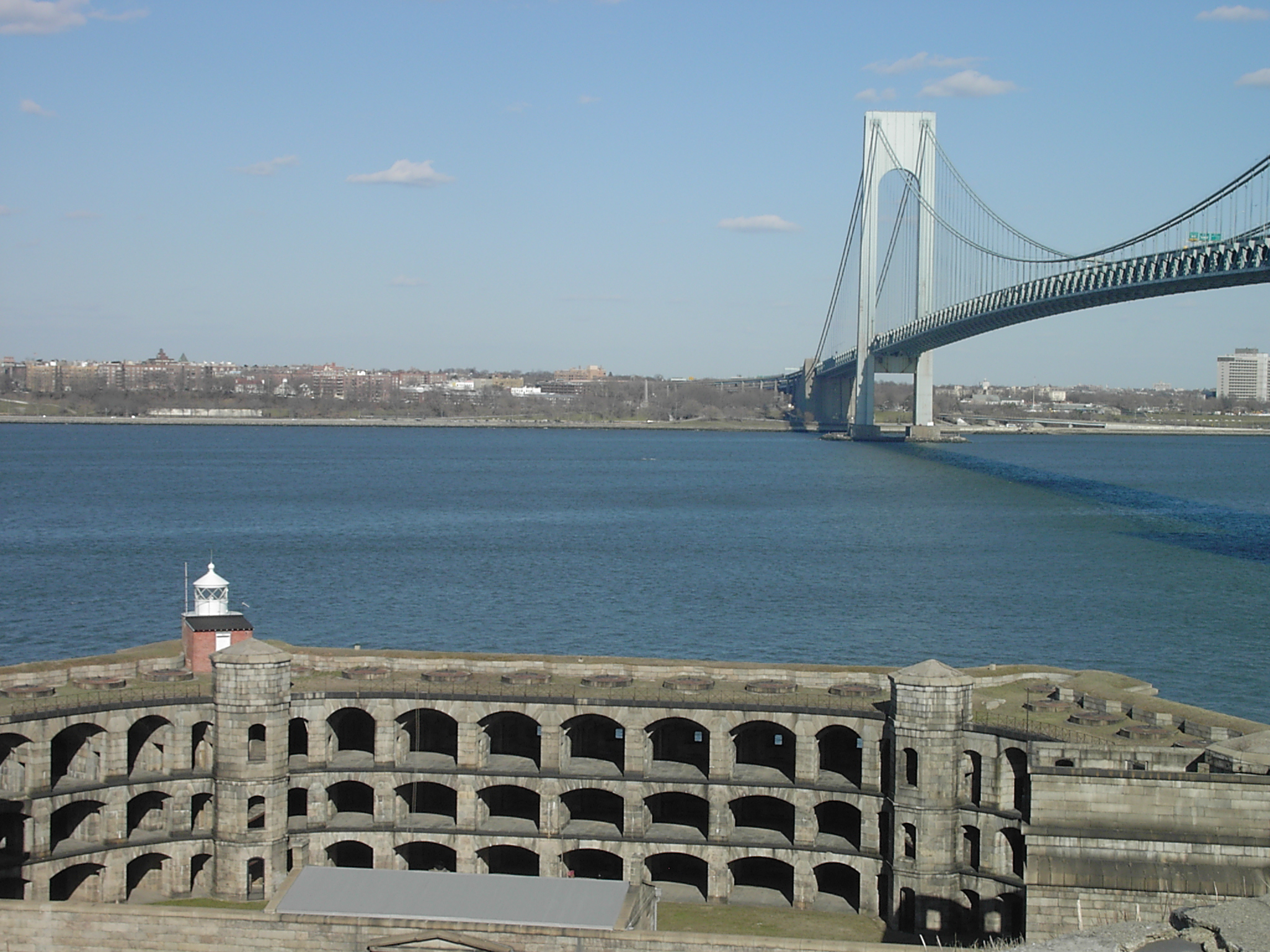
Battery Weed at Fort Wadsworth (foreground) on the Narrows, under the Verrazzano–Narrows Bridge

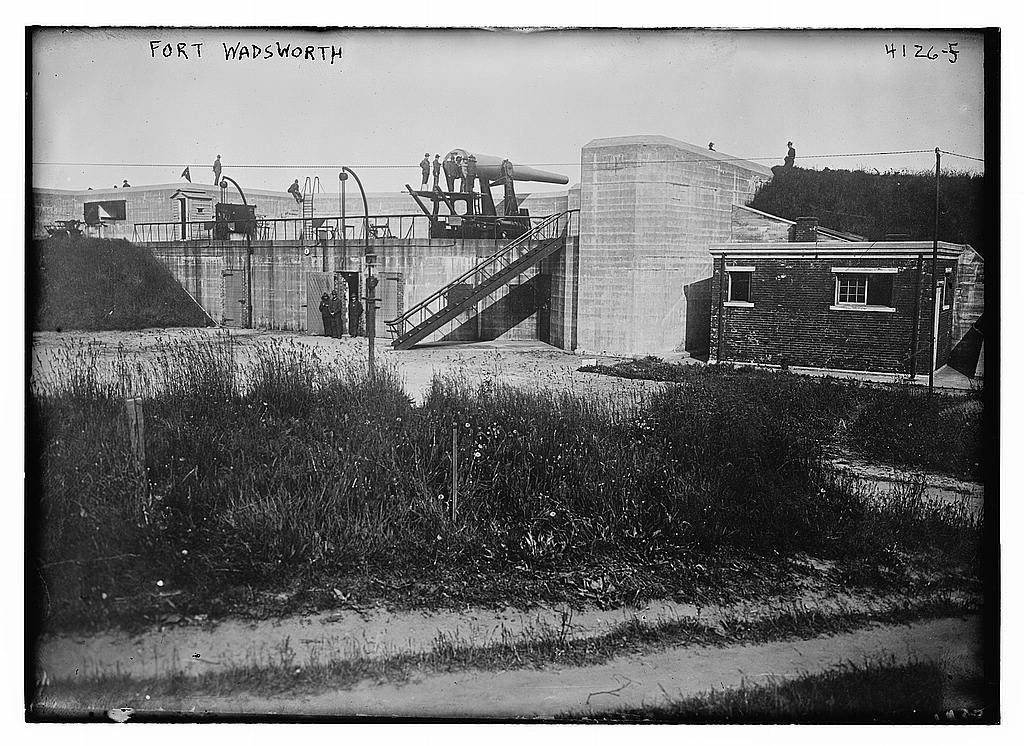
Unidentified battery at Fort Wadsworth circa 1917

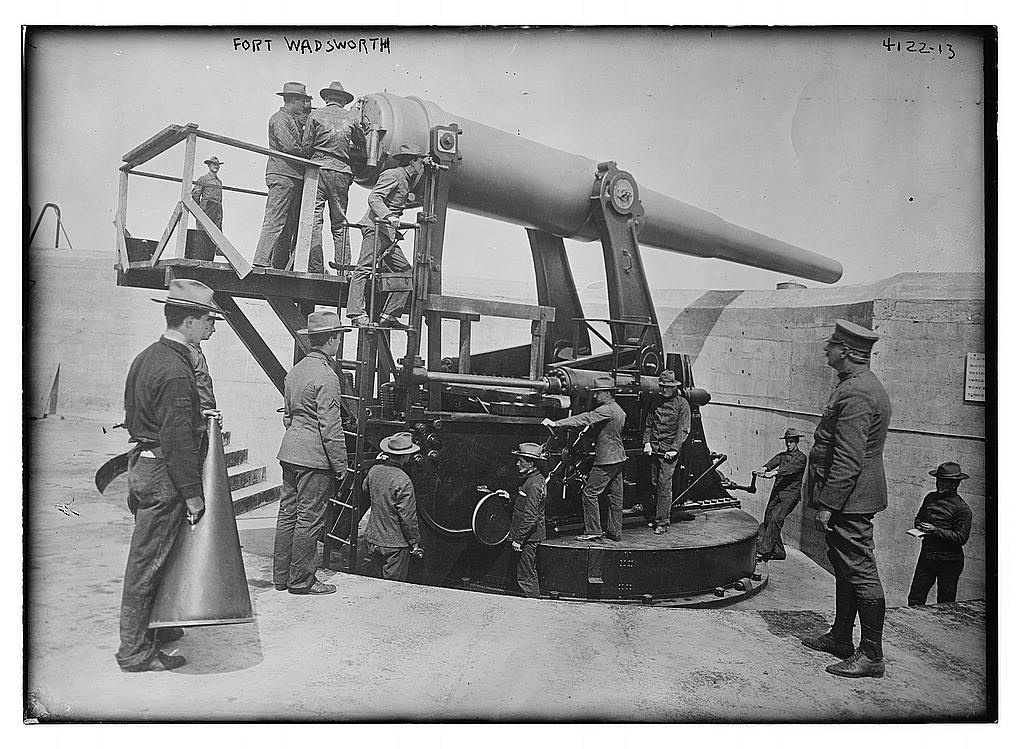
Disappearing gun at Fort Wadsworth in 1917

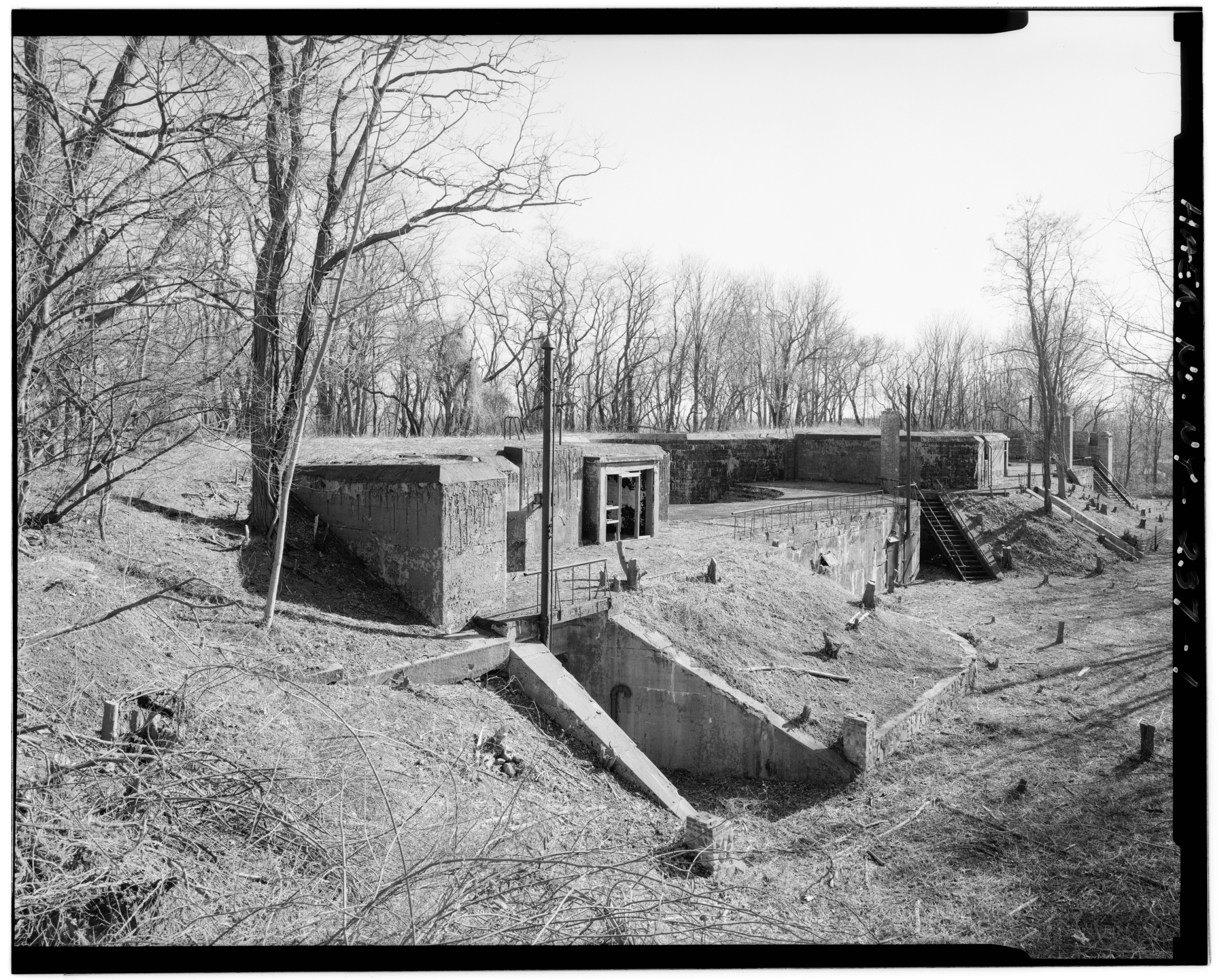
Battery Richmond in 1988

=== Early history ===
The first use of the land for military purposes was as the site of a blockhouse built by Dutch settler David Pieterszen de Vries on Signal Hill (now the site of Fort Tompkins), in 1655. The site is said to have been continuously garrisoned since another blockhouse was built in 1663, which survived at least through 1808. During the American Revolution the area became known as Flagstaff Fort; captured by the British in 1776, it remained in British hands and was expanded until the war's end in 1783. It became the responsibility of New York State in 1806, at which time four forts were built on the site with state resources, being ready for service in 1808 though incomplete. These included the red sandstone Forts Richmond (on the site now called Battery Weed) and Tompkins, on the sites of the current forts but of different design, and Forts Morton and Hudson, with positions for a total of 164 guns in the four forts. Fort Tompkins at that time included a red sandstone enclosure containing the 1663 blockhouse. Fort Richmond was initially semicircular while Fort Tompkins was a regular pentagon with circular bastions, both very different from their Third System replacements. Although these forts were contemporary with the federal government's second system of seacoast fortifications, they were not part of the federal program. Federal rebuilding of Forts Richmond and Tompkins did not begin until 1847.

Fort Richmond was named for Richmond County, in which Staten Island is located. Fort Tompkins was named for Daniel D. Tompkins, New York's governor in the War of 1812. Fort Morton was possibly named for Major General Jacob Morton, commander of the New York state militia in the War of 1812. Fort Hudson was named for Henry Hudson, a British-born explorer for the Dutch East India Company who explored the river named for him.

=== War of 1812 ===
During the War of 1812, New York State expanded Fort Richmond and its surrounding forts. In 1814, money was appropriated to complete Forts Richmond and Fort Tompkins, and by 1815, 900 cannons were reportedly amassed in the area. New York City was not attacked in that war (probably due to the vast number of forts and cannon in the city and harbor), so the forts never fired in anger.

=== Third System ===
By 1835 Forts Richmond (now Battery Weed) and Tompkins had deteriorated to the point that they were declared unfit for use, and the next year the federal government began a decade-long process of purchasing them. In 1847 total reconstructions of both forts began, under the federal third system of seacoast fortifications, an across-the-board program of new forts sparked by the burning of Washington, DC in the War of 1812. Some sources state that the new Forts Richmond and Tompkins were initially designed by Robert E. Lee during his tenure as post engineer at Fort Hamilton in the 1840s. Fort Richmond had one landward front and three seacoast fronts, with an unusual four tiers of cannon totaling 116 guns to seaward, plus 24 flank howitzers on the landward front.

The four-tier arrangement was only duplicated in the United States by Castle Williams on Governors Island and Fort Point in San Francisco, California. Fort Tompkins provided the bulk of the landward defense in the area, with one seaward and four landward fronts. It was unusual in having no embrasures for cannon in the main fort. A seacoast cannon battery was mounted on the roof of the seacoast front, and the rest of the fort had only musket loopholes. It had a ditch on the landward sides with tunnels to counterscarp galleries providing additional musket fire against enemies in the ditch, supplemented by a few well-placed flank howitzers. Both forts were ready for service, though still incomplete, when the Civil War broke out in April 1861.

=== Civil War era ===
New York City was not attacked by sea in the Civil War, so the forts did not have an active role. However, they were important as mobilization centers, including Smith's Cantonment near the forts. The North and South Cliff batteries were built flanking Fort Richmond, which was renamed Fort Wadsworth in 1865. Two small batteries of two and five guns were also built near Fort Tompkins. Following the war, it was determined that masonry forts were obsolete. In the 1870s a large-scale but short-lived program of building new earth-protected batteries near existing forts commenced. The new defenses were mainly armed with Rodman guns, large smoothbores of 15-inch and 10-inch caliber along with 8-inch converted rifles. At Fort Wadsworth, this included improvements to the batteries built during the Civil War, along with rebuilding Battery Hudson for new guns and a new mortar battery near Fort Tompkins that was never armed. Battery Hudson included an emplacement for the United States' first type of disappearing gun, a 15-inch Rodman on King's depression carriage, which was not widely adopted. A mine casemate for controlling an underwater minefield was built in Fort Richmond in 1875 and was later re-used when mines became a standard part of the harbor defenses. In the late 1870s funding for coast defenses was cut off, and it was 20 years before significant new defenses were completed.

=== Endicott period (1885–1916) ===
The 1885 Board of Fortifications, chaired by Secretary of War William C. Endicott and also called the Endicott Board, recommended sweeping improvements to US coast defenses, with a new generation of modern breech-loading rifled guns and numerous new gun batteries. Most of the Board's recommendations were adopted as the Endicott program, and that included major changes and improvements for Fort Wadsworth. The fort became part of the Artillery District of New York, renamed in 1913 as the Coast Defenses of Southern New York. Part of the Endicott Program included renaming the entire fort area as Fort Wadsworth, with the former Fort Richmond becoming Battery Weed, in General Order No. 16 of February 4, 1902. Battery Weed was named for Brigadier General Stephen H. Weed, killed at Gettysburg in 1863.

From 1896 to 1905 the following batteries were completed at Fort Wadsworth:

Name	No. of guns	Gun type	Carriage type	Years active
Ayres	2	12-inch gun M1895	disappearing M1895	1901-1942
Dix	2	12-inch gun M1900	disappearing M1901	1904-1944
Hudson	2	12-inch gun M1888	disappearing M1896	1899-1944
Richmond	2	12-inch gun M1888	disappearing M1896	1899-1942
Barry	2	10-inch gun M1888	disappearing M1896	1897-1918
Upton	2	10-inch gun M1888	disappearing M1896	1897-1942
Duane	5	8-inch gun M1888	disappearing M1894	1896-1915
Unnamed	2	8-inch gun M1888	Rodman carriage	1898-1898
Mills	2	6-inch gun M1897	disappearing M1898	1900-1943
Barbour	2	6-inch Armstrong gun	pedestal	1898-1920
Barbour	2	4.72-inch/40 caliber Armstrong gun	pedestal	1898-1920
Turnbull	6	3-inch gun M1902	pedestal M1902	1903-1944
Bacon	2	3-inch gun M1898	masking parapet M1898	1899-1918
Catlin	6	3-inch gun M1903	pedestal M1903	1903-1942

Facilities for planting and controlling an underwater minefield were also built. The unnamed battery of two 8-inch guns and the two sections of Battery Barbour were commenced shortly after the outbreak of the Spanish–American War in early 1898. At that time most of the Endicott batteries were still years from completion, and it was feared the Spanish fleet would bombard East Coast ports. The 8-inch guns were an expedient conversion of carriages for Rodman guns to allow the modern 8-inch M1888 gun to be brought into service. The 6-inch and 4.72-inch Armstrong guns were purchased from the United Kingdom, to rapidly deploy medium caliber quick-firing guns at the forts. The guns of the temporary 8-inch batteries were removed soon after the war ended (also in 1898), to be deployed in the new Endicott batteries, while the Armstrong guns remained in service until the 1920s. In 1901 the heavy artillery companies at all forts were redesignated as coast artillery companies, and in 1907 these units became a separate corps, the United States Army Coast Artillery Corps. An unusual problem occurred with Battery Duane: it was made of inferior concrete which eventually deteriorated, and the battery was removed from service in 1915. In 1913 Batteries Turnbull and Catlin swapped their guns.

In 1910, the fort fired a 21-gun salute to former President Theodore Roosevelt as his ship passed through the Narrows on his return from a nearly year-long trip to Africa and Europe. In 1913, ground was broken by President William Howard Taft for a proposed National American Indian Memorial that was to be built on the site of Fort Tompkins. The monument was to include a 165-foot-tall (50 m) statue of an American Indian on the bluff overlooking the Narrows, but difficulties in fundraising and the advent of World War I precluded fruition of the plan.

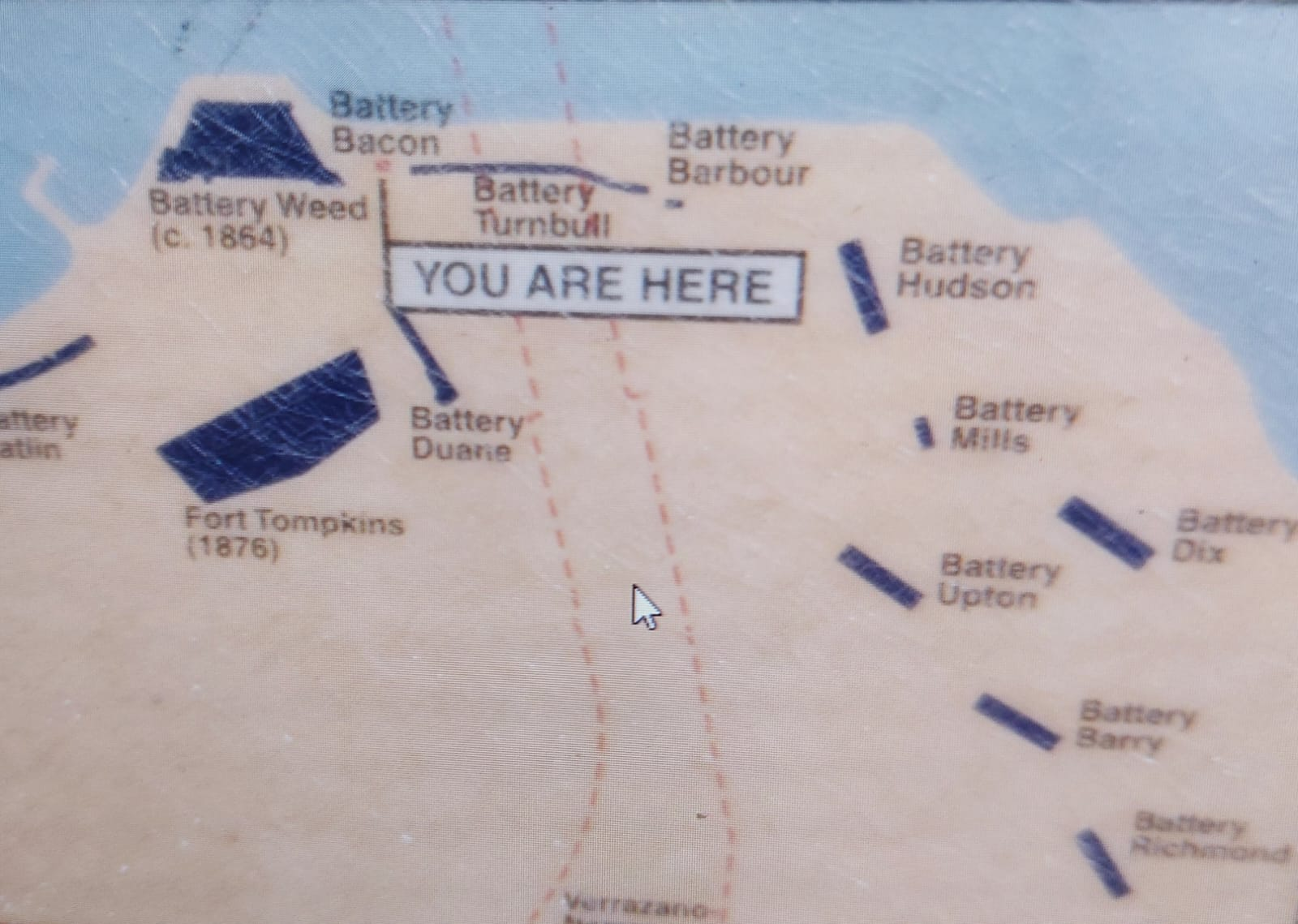
An interior view of Fort Wadsworth showing the location of the fortifications in the compound. The dashed red "trail" marks the location of today's Verrazzano-Narrows Bridge connecting Staten Island with Brooklyn to the east. The map was taken in site, maintained by the National Park Service

=== World War I ===
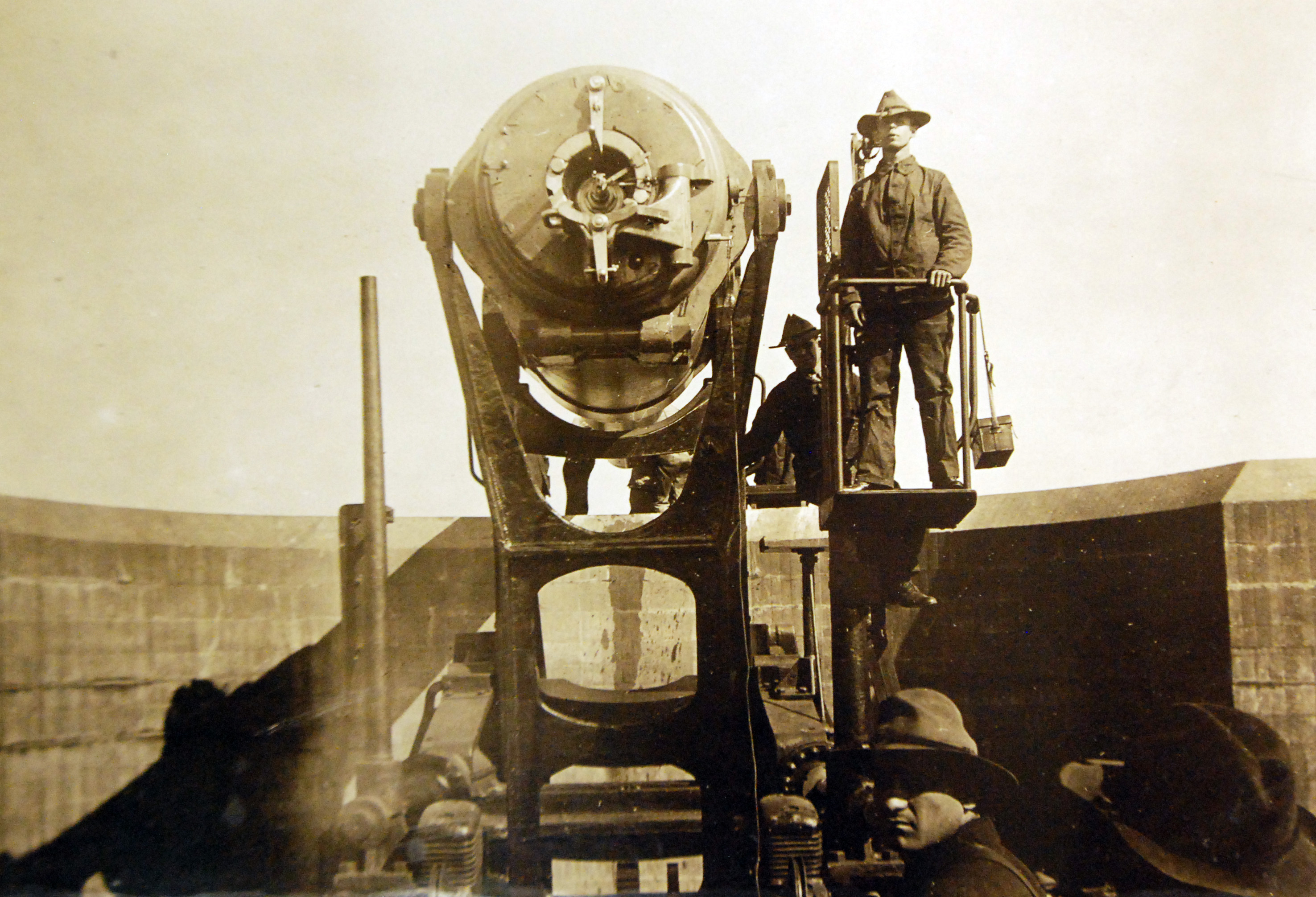
12" gun ready for action

Following the American entry into World War I, Fort Wadsworth's role as the largest fort guarding New York City was an important one. Some batteries were directed to be ready to fire 24/7. Most coastal forts in CONUS had their garrison reduced to provide crews for heavy and railway artillery units destined for the Western Front. This did not seem to occur at Fort Wadsworth. Also, a number of 10-inch and 12-inch guns were withdrawn from forts in 1917-1918 for potential use as railway artillery; at Fort Wadsworth most of these weapons were relatively promptly replaced by guns from less-threatened forts. Both guns of Battery Ayres, one gun of Battery Hudson, and one gun of Battery Upton were replaced in 1918 due to this program. However, Battery Barry's pair of 10-inch guns was removed and not replaced.

=== Between the wars ===
Following World War I, a number of coast artillery weapon types were withdrawn from service. These included the 4.7-inch and 6-inch Armstrong guns of Battery Barbour, and the 3-inch M1898 guns of Battery Bacon, all in 1920. These were not replaced. By 1924, Fort Wadsworth had become an infantry post, with the coast artillery batteries in caretaker status, with only a few soldiers garrisoned for maintenance. The construction of long-range 12-inch gun batteries at Fort Hancock, New Jersey and a 16-inch gun battery at Fort Tilden had relegated Fort Wadsworth to the second line of defense for Greater New York.

=== World War II ===
Although Fort Wadsworth was an important mobilization center, it received little new armament in World War II. New defenses for Greater New York in that war centered on Fort Tilden, the long-range 12-inch batteries at Fort Hancock, and a new 16-inch gun battery at the Highlands Military Reservation in Navesink, New Jersey. Fort Wadsworth's heavy guns were gradually scrapped during the war. Battery 218, a magazine bunker for a pair of 6-inch guns, was built but not armed. A 16-inch gun battery (Battery 115) was proposed for Fort Wadsworth but not built. Four 3-inch guns of Battery Turnbull were relocated to Battery New Turnbull, still at Fort Wadsworth. Battery Catlin's six 3-inch guns were sent to new batteries on the other side of the Narrows, four to Anti-Motor Torpedo Boat Battery (AMTB) 18 (also called Battery New Catlin) at Norton Point and two to AMTB 20 at Rockaway Point.

=== Post World War II through 1990s ===
Following World War II all US coast artillery guns were scrapped. From 1948 to 1952 Fort Wadsworth was the Headquarters of the 102nd Antiaircraft Artillery Brigade (New York National Guard) for the air defense of New York City. From 1952 until 1960 it was the Headquarters of the 52nd Antiaircraft Artillery Brigade, until the Brigade moved to the Highlands Air Force Station. Although Fort Wadsworth was a Nike missile headquarters between 1952 and 1964, no missiles were stationed at the fort. However, a 120 mm M1 gun battery was at the fort from 1952 until 1955. It then was the site of the United States Army Chaplain school, while also hosting the Fort Wadsworth Museum within Fort Tompkins, which displayed free exhibits depicting the history of the fort and the U.S. Army.

The base was turned over to the United States Navy in 1979, which used it as the headquarters of Naval Station New York. As a result of the Base Closure and Realignment Commission process, the Navy left and the property was transferred to the National Park Service as part of the Gateway National Recreation Area in 1995. With the 1996 closure of the United States Coast Guard Atlantic Area headquarters and base at Governors Island, their New York-based operations moved to Fort Wadsworth, as tenants in some of the buildings and housing previously occupied by the Navy.

=== Current government usage ===
As of 2007, some Fort Wadsworth buildings are occupied by the United States Coast Guard's Sector New York and Maritime Safety and Security Team 91106. The 353d Civil Affairs Command, a United States Army Reserve unit, occupies several buildings on the fort. Other buildings house administrative and educational facilities for the National Park Service as well as operations of the United States Park Police.

== Demographics ==
For census purposes, the New York City Department of City Planning classifies Fort Wadsworth as part of the Neighborhood Tabulation Area called Fort Wadsworth SI9561. This designated neighborhood had 495 inhabitants based on data from the 2020 United States Census. This was an decrease of 236 persons (-32.3%) from the 731 counted in 2010. The neighborhood had a population density of 2.2 inhabitants per acre (14,500/sq mi; 5,600/km^{2}).

The racial makeup of the neighborhood was 48.1% (238) White (Non-Hispanic), 8.1% (40) Black (Non-Hispanic), 3.0% (15) Asian, and 9.7% (48) from two or more races. Hispanic or Latino of any race were 31.1% (154) of the population.

The largest age group was people 20–34 years old, which made up 29.9% of the residents. 82.8% of the households had at least one family present. Out of the 157 households, 69.4% had a married couple (42.7% with a child under 18), 3.2% had a cohabiting couple (1.9% with a child under 18), 11.5% had a single male (0.6% with a child under 18), and 15.9% had a single female (5.7% with a child under 18). 52.2% of households had children under 18. In this neighborhood, 98.7% of non-vacant housing units are renter-occupied.

The entirety of Community District 2, which comprises Fort Wadsworth and other Mid-Island neighborhoods, had 134,657 inhabitants as of NYC Health's 2018 Community Health Profile, with an average life expectancy of 81.2 years. This is the same as the median life expectancy of 81.2 for all New York City neighborhoods. Most inhabitants are youth and middle-aged adults: 20% are between the ages of between 0–17, 25% between 25 and 44, and 29% between 45 and 64. The ratio of college-aged and elderly residents was lower, at 8% and 18% respectively.

As of 2017, the median household income in Community District 2 was $81,487, though the median income in South Beach individually was $80,361. In 2018, an estimated 14% of Fort Wadsworth and Mid-Island residents lived in poverty, compared to 17% in all of Staten Island and 20% in all of New York City. One in sixteen residents (6%) were unemployed, compared to 6% in Staten Island and 9% in New York City. Rent burden, or the percentage of residents who have difficulty paying their rent, is 52% in South Beach and Mid-Island, compared to the boroughwide and citywide rates of 49% and 51% respectively. Based on this calculation, as of 2018, Fort Wadsworth and Mid-Island are considered high-income relative to the rest of the city and not gentrifying.

== Present ==
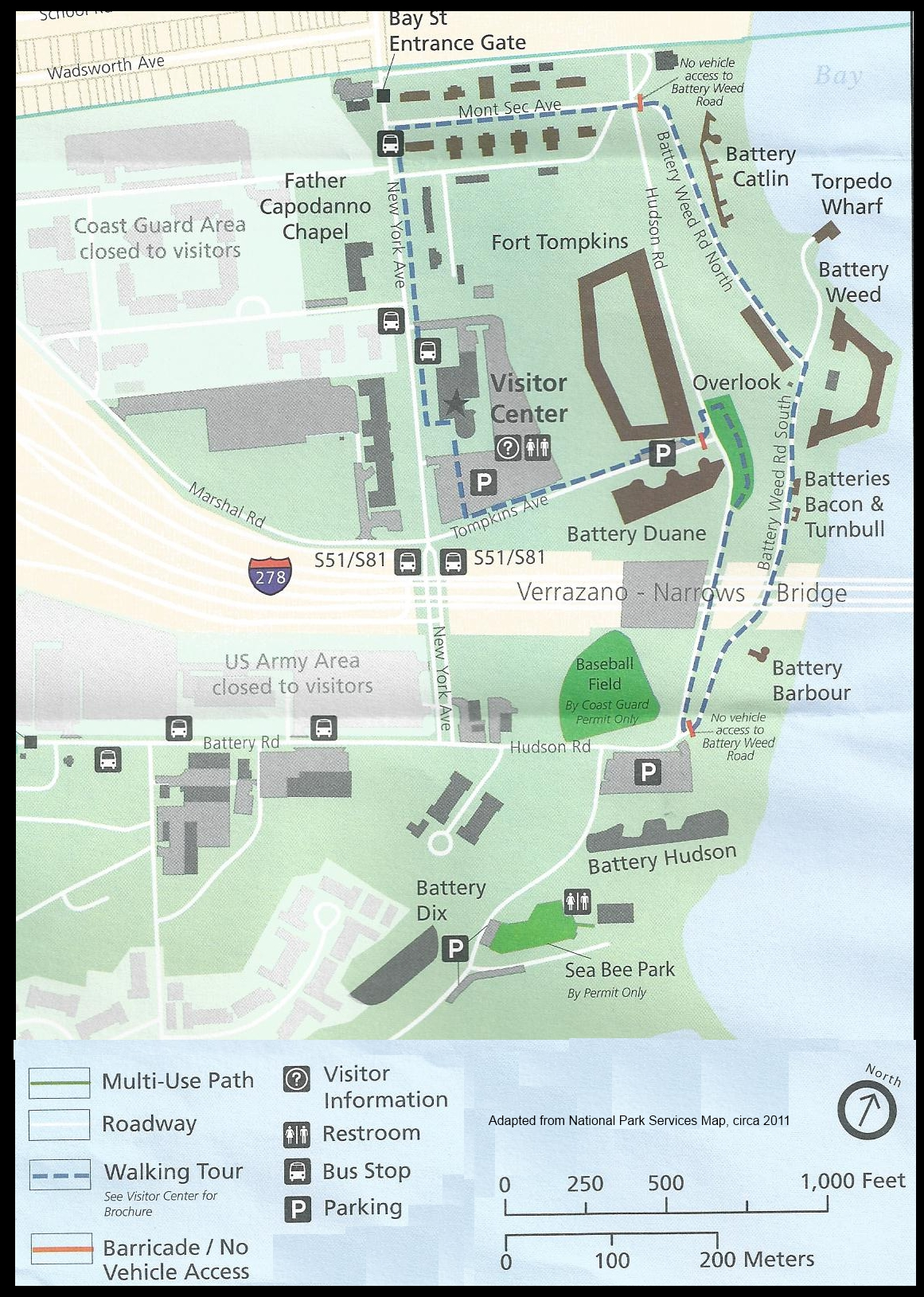
Extract of NPS Map of Fort Wadsworth, circa 2011

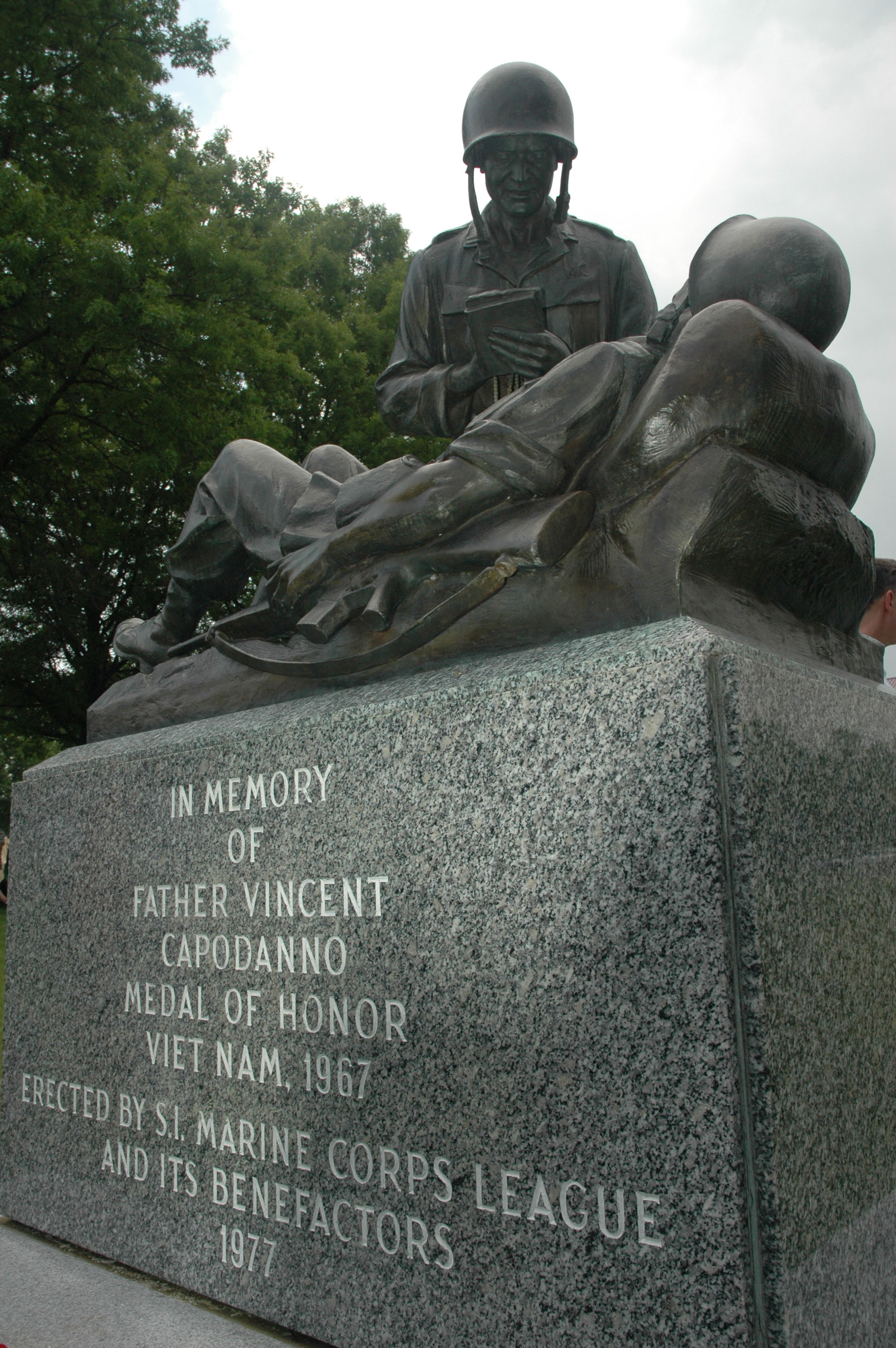
Memorial to Father Vincent R. Capodanno, Navy chaplain and Medal of Honor recipient

Historic structures include Battery Weed, directly on the harbor, and Fort Tompkins on the bluff above. Both were built in the mid-19th Century and are open to the public on guided tours only. There are several smaller early 20th Century coastal artillery batteries and an overlook with panoramic views of the Upper Bay, Brooklyn and Manhattan. A memorial to Father Vincent R. Capodanno, a Navy chaplain from Staten Island who was killed serving with the 1st Battalion 5th Marines in Vietnam and received a posthumous Medal of Honor, is at the fort near the Father Capodanno Chapel. The National Park Service currently maintains a visitors' center on site and offers ranger-led tours of the facilities. Portions of the fort, including Battery Weed and the Fort Tompkins Quadrangle, are listed on the National Register of Historic Places. The entire Fort Wadsworth complex was listed in the National Register in 2022.

=== Annual events ===
The New York City Marathon, an annual marathon (42.195 km or 26.219 mi) that courses through the five boroughs of New York City, starts on Fort Wadsworth. The Five Boro Bike Tour is an annual recreational cycling event in New York City that starts at Battery Park in Lower Manhattan and ends with a festival in Fort Wadsworth.

== Neighborhood ==
The name "Fort Wadsworth" is also sometimes used to denote the residential neighborhood surrounding the former fort, the neighborhood south of Rosebank, west of Shore Acres and north of South Beach. This neighborhood once had a station on the South Beach Branch of the Staten Island Railway; service on this branch ceased in 1953.

== In popular culture ==
In the comic book series G.I. Joe: A Real American Hero, G.I. Joe's elite United States military counterterroism unit operated from "The Pit," a secret underground base concealed beneath the Motor Pool of the Army Chaplains' Assistants School at Fort Wadsworth. After The Pit was destroyed by a Cobra surprise attack, G.I. Joe relocated the headquarters to an undisclosed location. Although written in 1982, the book still depicted the fort as the home of the "Chaplain's Assistants School", due to writer Larry Hama's memories of the fort from his years in the service. Also, Ft. Wadsworth did not actually have a proper motor pool; its equipment was serviced at Fort Hamilton.

The 2016 thriller film Nerve was partially filmed here. Fort Wadsworth served as the setting for the final scene of the movie.

== See also ==
- Fort Wadsworth station of the Staten Island Railway
- Fort Wadsworth Light
- Seacoast defense in the United States
- United States Army Coast Artillery Corps
