= Battery Weed =

Fortification in Staten Island, New York

- U.S. National Register of Historic Places
- New York City Landmark
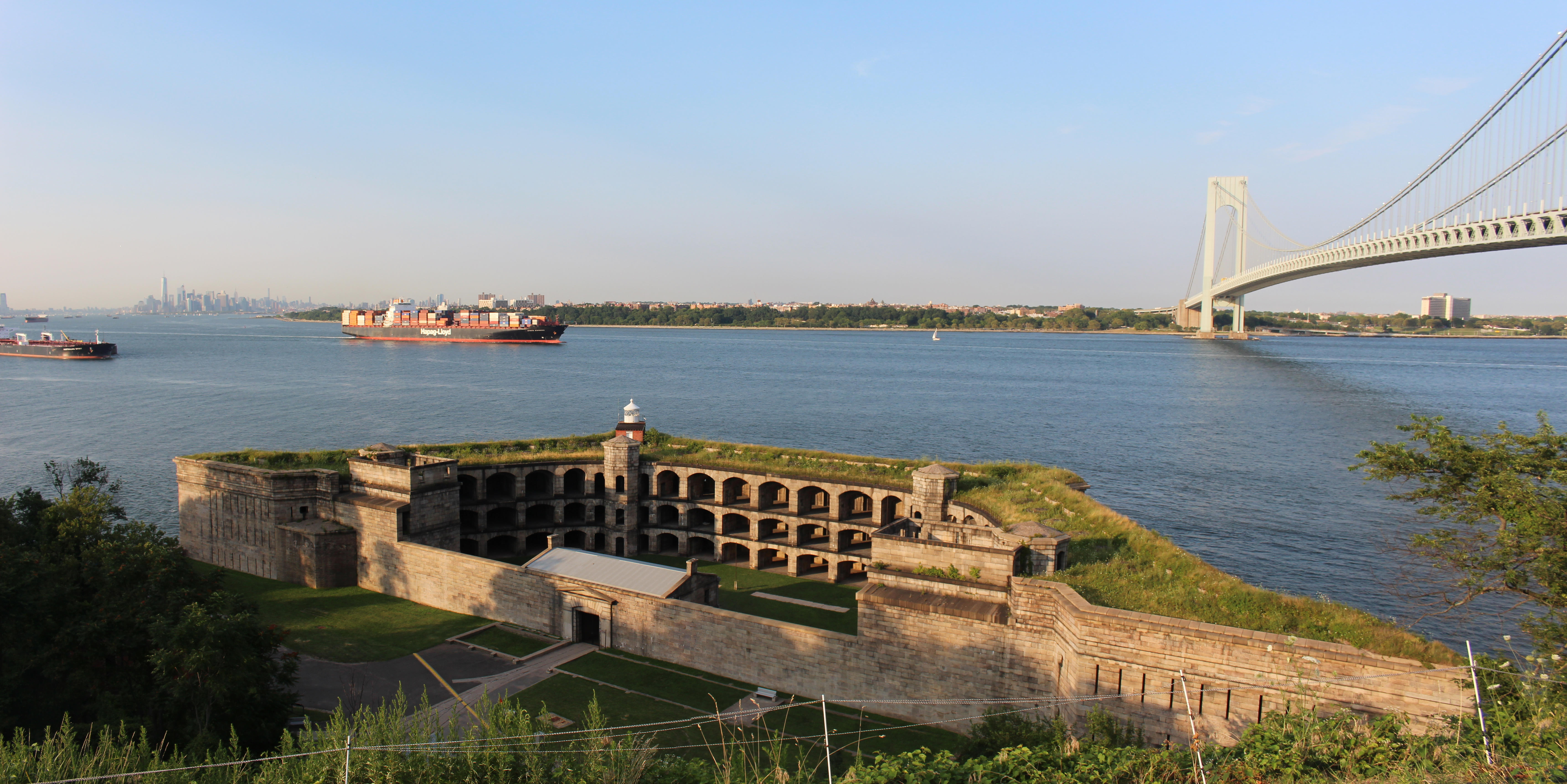

- Location within New York City
- Location: Fort Wadsworth Reservation, New York, New York
- Coordinates: 40°36′19″N 74°3′17″W
- Area: less than 1-acre (4,000 m^{2})
- Built: 1845–1861
- Architect: Robert E. Lee, Joseph G. Totten
- Architectural style: Third System of US fortifications
- NRHP reference No.: 72000908
- NYCL No.: 0379

Significant dates
- Added to NRHP: January 20, 1972
- Designated NYCL: October 12, 1967

Battery Weed is a four-tiered 19th century fortification guarding the Narrows, the main approach from the Atlantic Ocean to New York City. Located on the Staten Island waterfront on the west shore of the Narrows, directly across from Fort Hamilton and the now-destroyed Fort Lafayette in Brooklyn, the fort was intended to protect New York from attack by sea. When built, it was named Fort Richmond, as was a previous fort on the site.

== History ==
=== Early 19th century ===
The first fort on the site was built by the State of New York beginning in 1806, which was ready for service in 1808 though incomplete. This fort was built of red sandstone and named Fort Richmond, after the county in which Staten Island is located, which was named for Charles Lennox, 1st Duke of Richmond. It was protected on the landward side by the first Fort Tompkins, also built of red sandstone by the state. Fort Richmond was initially semicircular while Fort Tompkins was a regular pentagon with circular bastions, both very different from their Third System replacements. Although these forts were contemporary with the federal government's second system of seacoast fortifications, they were not part of the federal program. Federal rebuilding of Forts Richmond and Tompkins did not begin until 1847. This fort and others nearby were expanded and completed during the War of 1812.

=== Third system fort ===
By 1835 Forts Richmond and Tompkins had deteriorated to the point that they were declared unfit for use, and the next year the federal government began a decade-long process of purchasing them. In 1847 total reconstructions of both forts began, under the federal third system of seacoast fortifications, an across-the-board program of new forts sparked by the burning of Washington, DC in the War of 1812. This program resulted in the forts that are present today. Some sources state that the new Forts Richmond and Tompkins were initially designed by Robert E. Lee during his tenure as post engineer at Fort Hamilton in the 1840s. Fort Richmond had one landward front and three seacoast fronts, with an unusual four tiers of cannon totaling 116 guns to seaward, plus 24 flank howitzers on the landward front. Among forts as completed, the four-tier arrangement was only duplicated in the United States by Castle Williams on Governors Island and Fort Point in San Francisco, California. The detailed design of the new Fort Richmond was by General Joseph G. Totten, and it was built between 1845 and 1861. In 1865 it was renamed Fort Wadsworth, after Brigadier General James Wadsworth, killed in the 1864 Battle of the Wilderness during the Civil War.

=== Late 19th through early 20th century ===
A mine casemate for controlling an underwater minefield was built in the fort in 1875 and was later re-used when mines became a standard part of the harbor defenses in the 1890s. At that time numerous new gun batteries were built near the fort under the Endicott Program for the Harbor Defenses of New York. Part of that program was a renaming of the entire fortified area at the Narrows on Staten Island as Fort Wadsworth, with the former Fort Richmond becoming Battery Weed, in General Order No. 16 of 4 February 1902. Battery Weed was named for Brigadier General Stephen H. Weed, killed at Gettysburg in 1863.

In 1903, a small lighthouse was built atop Battery Weed. Its light was visible for 14 nautical miles (26 km). When the Verrazzano–Narrows Bridge opened in 1965 the lighthouse became obsolete. Dark for many years, it was restored and converted to solar power by volunteers in 2005.

== Present ==
Fort Wadsworth was an active military base until 1994, operated by the U.S. Navy for its final few years. In 1995, Battery Weed, along with the rest of Fort Wadsworth, was transferred to the care of the National Park Service as part of the Gateway National Recreation Area. Battery Weed's interior is open to the public on park ranger escorted tours only, although its exterior can be viewed at all times. A 10-inch smoothbore Rodman gun is preserved in the fort.

360 degree panoramic view of the interior of Battery Weed in 2016

== See also ==
- Fort Wadsworth
- List of New York City Designated Landmarks in Staten Island
- National Register of Historic Places listings in Richmond County, New York
- Fort Randolph (Panama), which has a two-gun Battery Weed
