= Gateway National Recreation Area =

US National Recreation Area in New York and New Jersey

- IUCN category V (protected landscape/seascape)
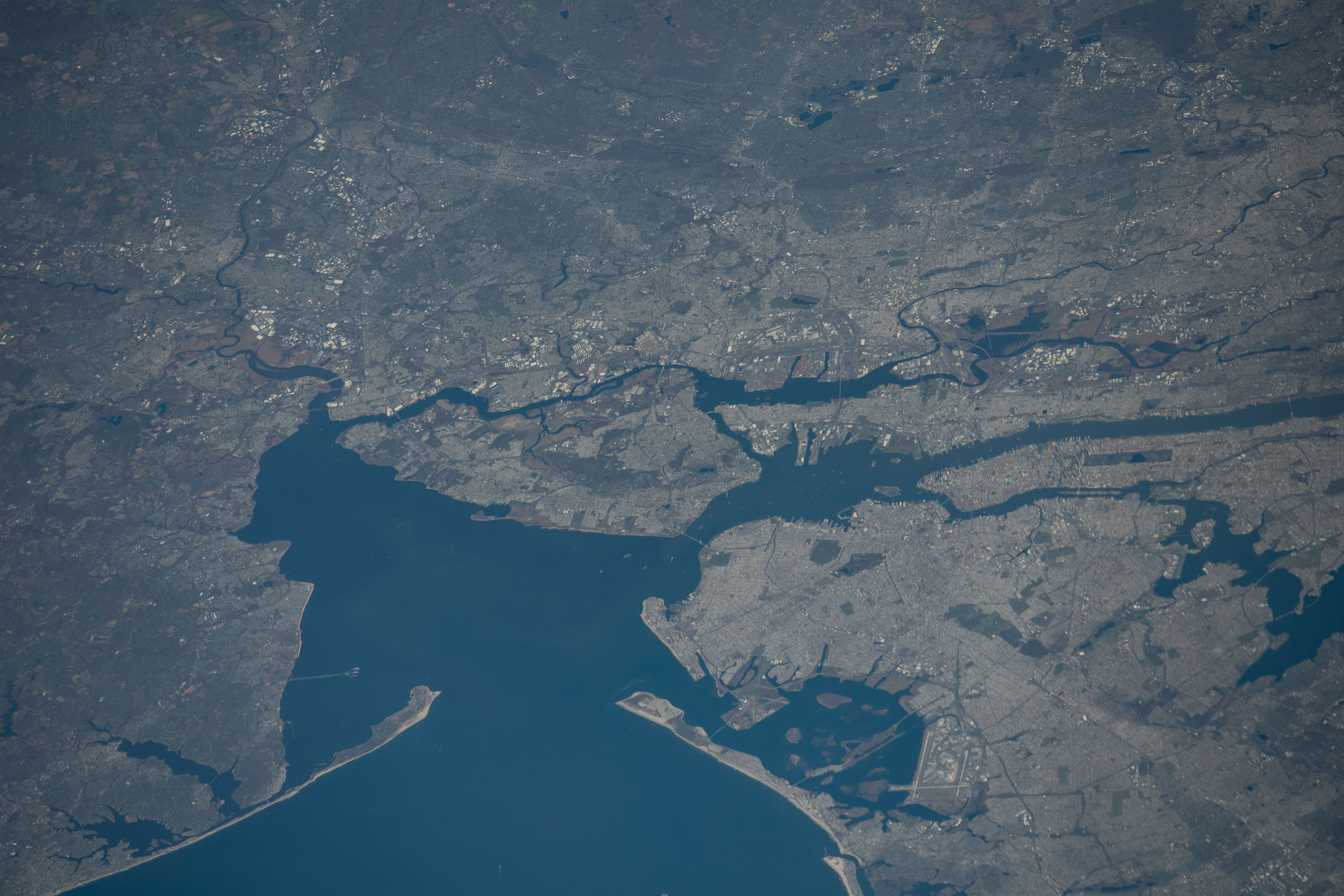
- View of the Gateway National Recreation Area (lower center) from the International Space Station on April 14, 2022
- Interactive map of Gateway National Recreation Area
- Location: New York and New Jersey, United States
- Coordinates: 40.45400°N 73.99699°W
- Area: 26,607 acres (107.67 km^{2})
- Established: October 27, 1972
- Visitors: 8,728,291 (in 2022)
- Governing body: National Park Service
- Website: Gateway National Recreation Area

Gateway National Recreation Area is a 26,607-acre (10,767 ha) U.S. national recreation area in New York City and Monmouth County, New Jersey. It provides recreational opportunities that are not commonly found in a dense urban environment, including ocean swimming, bird watching, boating, hiking and camping. More than 8.7 million people visited Gateway National Recreation Area in 2022, making it the fourth-most visited unit of the National Park Service.

Gateway was created by the U.S. Congress in 1972 to preserve and protect scarce or unique natural, cultural, and recreational resources with relatively convenient access by a high percentage of the nation's population. It is owned by the federal government and managed by the National Park Service.

Gateway is distinct from other national park units due to its lack of natural buffer zones and that it faces constant environmental changes driven by human activity. The lands and waters of Gateway represent some of the last remnants of the original shoreline. In 2001, the Jamaica Bay and Staten Island Units in New York drew more than 6 million visitors, while the Sandy Hook Unit in New Jersey attracted over 1 million.

== Creation ==
In 1969, the Regional Plan Association proposed a new national seashore in the New York metropolitan area, to be administered by the United States Department of the Interior. U.S. President Richard Nixon put his support behind a very similar proposal in 1970, with one significant change: instead of being designated a "seashore", the protected area would be a national park. In May of that year, the president started the process of getting Congressional approval for this move.

The United States House of Representatives approved the creation of Gateway National Recreation Area in September 1972, and most of the land was transferred to the National Park Service (NPS) for inclusion in Gateway National Recreation Area. In the same vote, the House denied the state's provision to create a housing development at Floyd Bennett Field, which was to be part of the Gateway Area. Gateway National Recreation Area was officially created on October 27, 1972, along with Golden Gate National Recreation Area in San Francisco. Gateway included over 26,000 acres (11,000 ha) of land. This excluded some of the land proposed by the RPA, including the Coney Island shore.

== Units and park sites ==
The recreation area comprises three units and 11 park sites in all. Primary law enforcement in the Gateway National Recreation Area is the responsibility of the United States Park Police in the New York units, and National Park Service Rangers in the New Jersey unit.

There are approximately 800 historic buildings, structures and sites in Gateway. It is challenging to maintain these historic buildings due to current conditions and resources numbers as well as funding. Many of these historic buildings were already in poor condition when Gateway was established in 1972.

=== Jamaica Bay Unit ===
Jamaica Bay Unit, in Brooklyn and Queens, includes much of the shoreline and water below the Shore Parkway beginning at Plum Beach and ending at John F. Kennedy International Airport, along with several dozen islands in Jamaica Bay, a tidal estuary. The Jamaica Bay Unit is the largest of the three units. It also includes most of the western part of the Rockaway Peninsula, which separates Jamaica Bay from the Atlantic Ocean. Among the sites in this unit are:

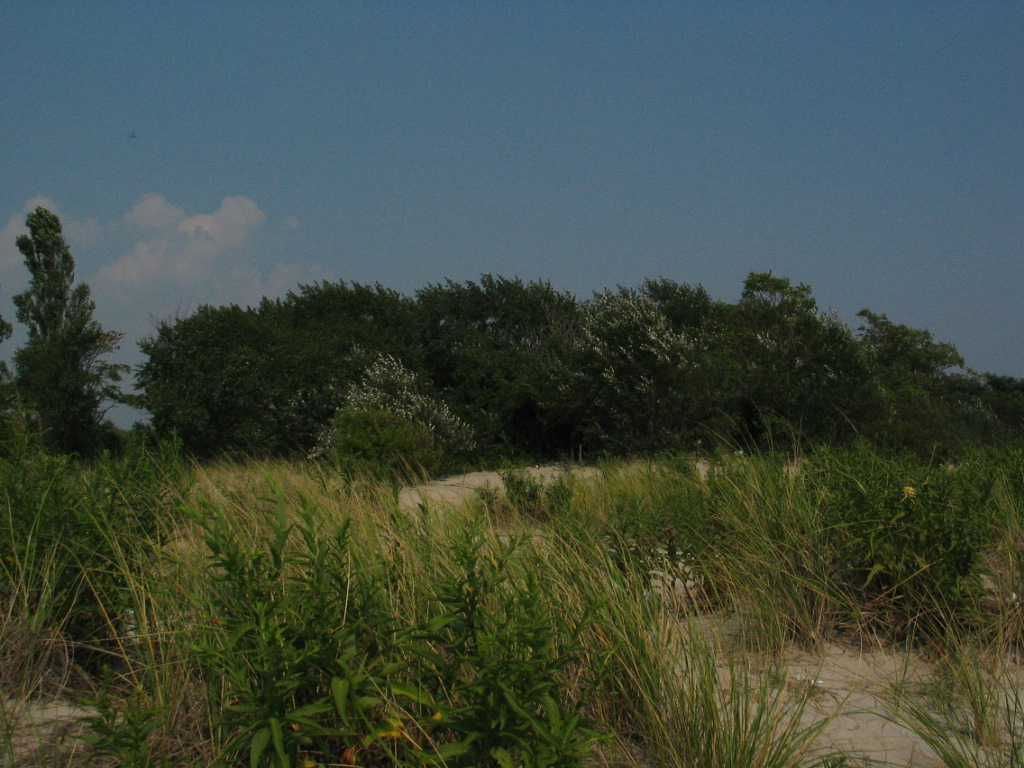
Jamaica Bay coastal landscapes

- Jamaica Bay Wildlife Refuge is a prime location for viewing birds and bird migrations, diamondback turtle egg-laying and horseshoe crab mating and egg laying. Its 9,155 acres (3,705 ha) are mostly open water, but includes upland shoreline and islands with salt marsh, dunes, brackish ponds, woodland, and fields. It is the only "wildlife refuge" in the National Park System. Originally created and managed by New York City as a "wildlife refuge", the term was retained by Gateway when the site was transferred. All other federally managed areas titled "wildlife refuge" are managed by the U.S. Fish & Wildlife Service under their own specific criteria and standards.
- Shirley Chisholm State Park is a park built on top of the former Pennsylvania Ave landfill along the belt parkway in the north of the bay. The park is operated by the New York State Office of Parks, Recreation and Historic Preservation, but the land is owned by the National Park Service and is leased to the state for a 60-year period. The park represents an innovative step in landfill remediation and redevelopment, and has cost $20 million as of 2019 to develop. The park features bike paths, free bike rentals, kayaking, fishing, and walking trails. The first phase of the park was opened in July 2019, and the second half was completed in 2021.
- Floyd Bennett Field, a decommissioned airfield with a historic district on the National Register of Historic Places, also hosts the Historic Aircraft Restoration Project (H.A.R.P.) in Hangar B where volunteers are working to preserve the park's collection of historic aircraft. Hangar B is open to the public at selected times during the week. Exhibits and programs on the airfield's history are available in the former control tower and terminal, since converted into the Ryan Visitor Center, named for William Fitts Ryan, the congressman who championed Gateway's creation. The former airfield also accommodates public camping, with 46 campsites. As of August 2013, Floyd Bennett Field campground provides hot showers and clean modern bathrooms. There is also a camp store. No electricity provided. Still, it is the only public campground maintained by the National Park Service that is within the limits of an American city, and the only legal campground in New York City. The grasslands of Floyd Bennett Field are a good place for viewing falcons such as kestrels. Floyd Bennett Field also includes concession recreational facilities including a sports arena and ice skating rinks in adaptively re-used hangars. Within this unit, but still nearby, are Dead Horse Bay, which includes a marina concession, and an adjacent golf driving range concession. Bergen Beach, on the north shore of Jamaica Bay, is also nearby and within the unit's boundary, supporting a horse riding academy concession.
- Canarsie Pier is the latest in a series of recreational piers near this location, and remains popular as a picnic area and fishing spot on the north shore of the bay.
- Fort Tilden, between Jacob Riis Park and Breezy Point on the Rockaway peninsula, has some of the city's most pristine and secluded ocean beaches, a successional maritime forest, a coastal dune system, and a freshwater pond. Between 1917 and 1974, Fort Tilden served as part of the harbor's system of defenses, and once housed Nike antiaircraft missiles. Today an observatory deck on one of the old batteries has views of Jamaica Bay, New York Harbor and the Manhattan skyline. Fort Tilden is one of the best places on New York Harbor to observe hawks during the fall migration.
- Breezy Point Tip occupies the westernmost part of the Rockaway peninsula, forming one side of the outer "gateway" to New York Harbor. Its 200 acres (81 ha) contain oceanfront beach, bay shoreline, dunes, marshes and coastal grasslands. Breezy Point Tip is a nesting area for the threatened piping plover.
- Jacob Riis Park is an ocean beach with a boardwalk and historic bathhouse with art deco elements. It was built by powerful New York planner and administrator Robert Moses, and was named after journalist, photographer and reformer Jacob Riis.

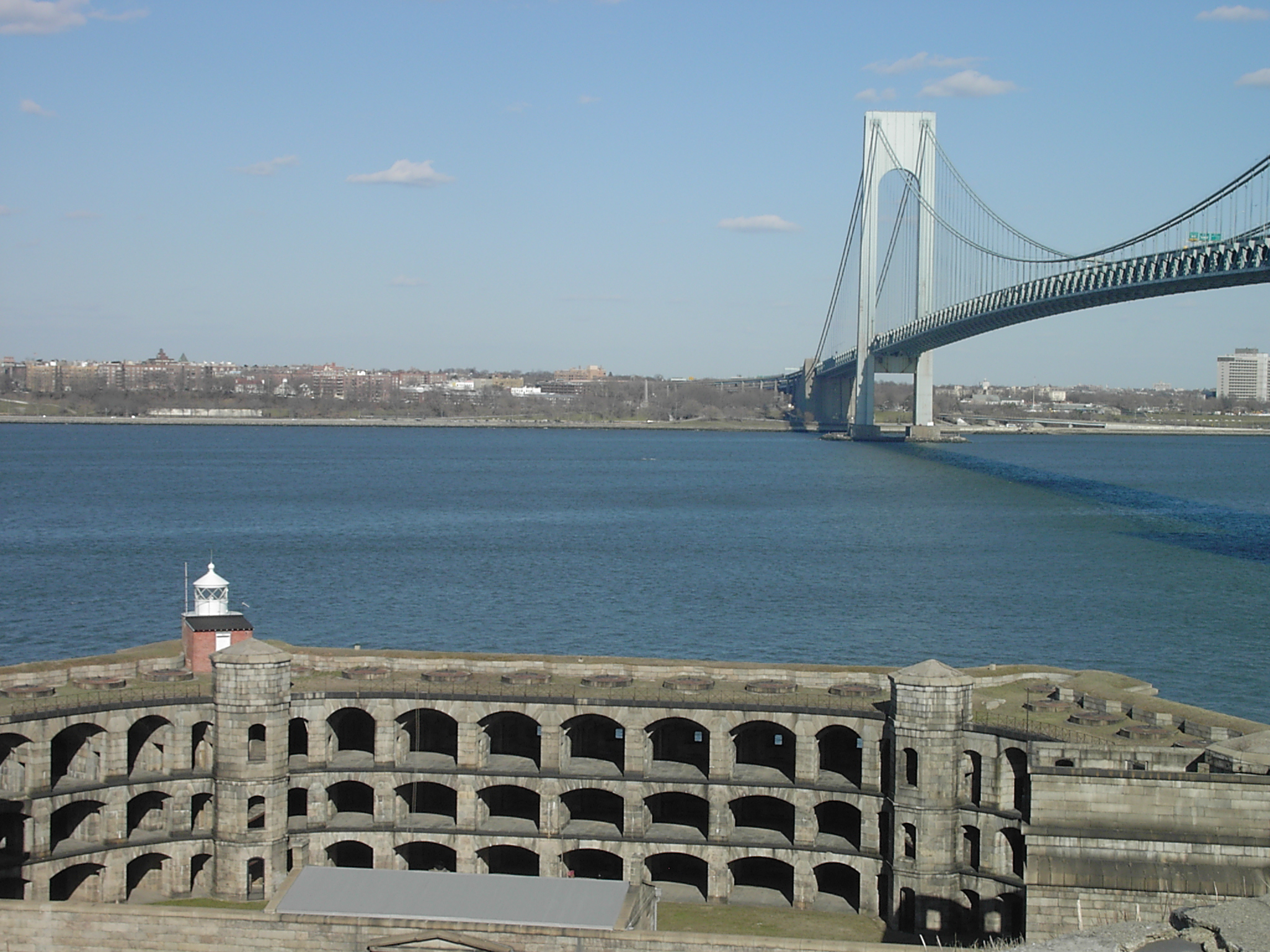
Battery Weed at Fort Wadsworth (foreground) on the Narrows, under the Verrazzano–Narrows Bridge

=== Staten Island Unit ===
Community District Tabulation Area Joint Interest Area (SI95) with areas for Fort Wadsworth, Great Kills Park, Miller Field and Hoffman & Swinburne Islands

The Staten Island Unit is located on the southeastern shore of Staten Island facing Lower New York Bay. It includes Hoffman and Swinburne Islands, both off limits to visitation and managed primarily for the benefit of avian species. The unit also includes the following three sites:

- Fort Wadsworth is a historic collection of masonry fortifications on the site of much earlier fortifications at the Narrows of New York Bay. It is one of the oldest military bases in the United States, having been established in 1663. At the time of Gateway's establishment in 1972, Fort Wadsworth was under the authority of the U.S. Army, and was turned over to the U.S. Navy in 1979. It officially ended its operations as a military base in 1993, and was placed under the jurisdiction of the National Park Service in 1995. Some noteworthy historical structures are Fort Tompkins, Battery Weed, and Mont Sec Avenue (Officers' Row). There are a variety of recreational activities available at this site, including biking, camping, bird watching, and kite flying.
- Miller Field is a historic former airfield south of New Dorp with picnic areas, open areas and sports fields.
- Great Kills Park includes a marina where visitors can go boating, a beach with lifeguards during the summer, and nature trails. It also serves as a nesting site for osprey.

As for Hoffman and Swinburne Islands, both are artificially constructed islands originally established in the late 19th century as quarantine centers for arriving immigrants at Ellis Island who were suspected to be carrying illnesses. Swinburne Island is the smaller of the two, at 4 acres, whereas Hoffman Island is 11 acres. Both islands are no longer publicly accessible, and now serve primarily as nesting sites for a variety of bird species. Harbor seals have also been spotted on Hoffman and Swinburne Islands during the winter season.

=== Sandy Hook Unit ===
Sandy Hook Unit is in Monmouth County in northern New Jersey. The Sandy Hook Unit covers roughly 1,665 acres of land, including 7.5 miles of ocean beaches, sheltered bayside coves, and hundreds of acres of ecologically important barrier beach vegetation. The area is home to ocean beaches, Sandy Hook Bay, salt marshes, the historic Fort Hancock, and the Sandy Hook Lighthouse. At the northern end of the unit lies the Fort Hancock complex, with hiking trails that wind through dunes, ponds, and some of the most valuable bird habitats in New Jersey. The barrier peninsula forms the other side of the "gateway" to New York Harbor.

- Fort Hancock served as part of the harbor's coastal defense system from 1895 until 1974 and contains 100 historic buildings and fortifications.
- Sandy Hook contains seven beaches, including Gunnison Beach, a nude beach by custom, as well as salt marshes and a maritime holly forest. Ferries from Manhattan are available in season. Fishing and using hand-launched vessels are popular here.
- The Maritime Holly Forest is the largest holly forest in the Northeastern United States.

== Animal wildlife ==
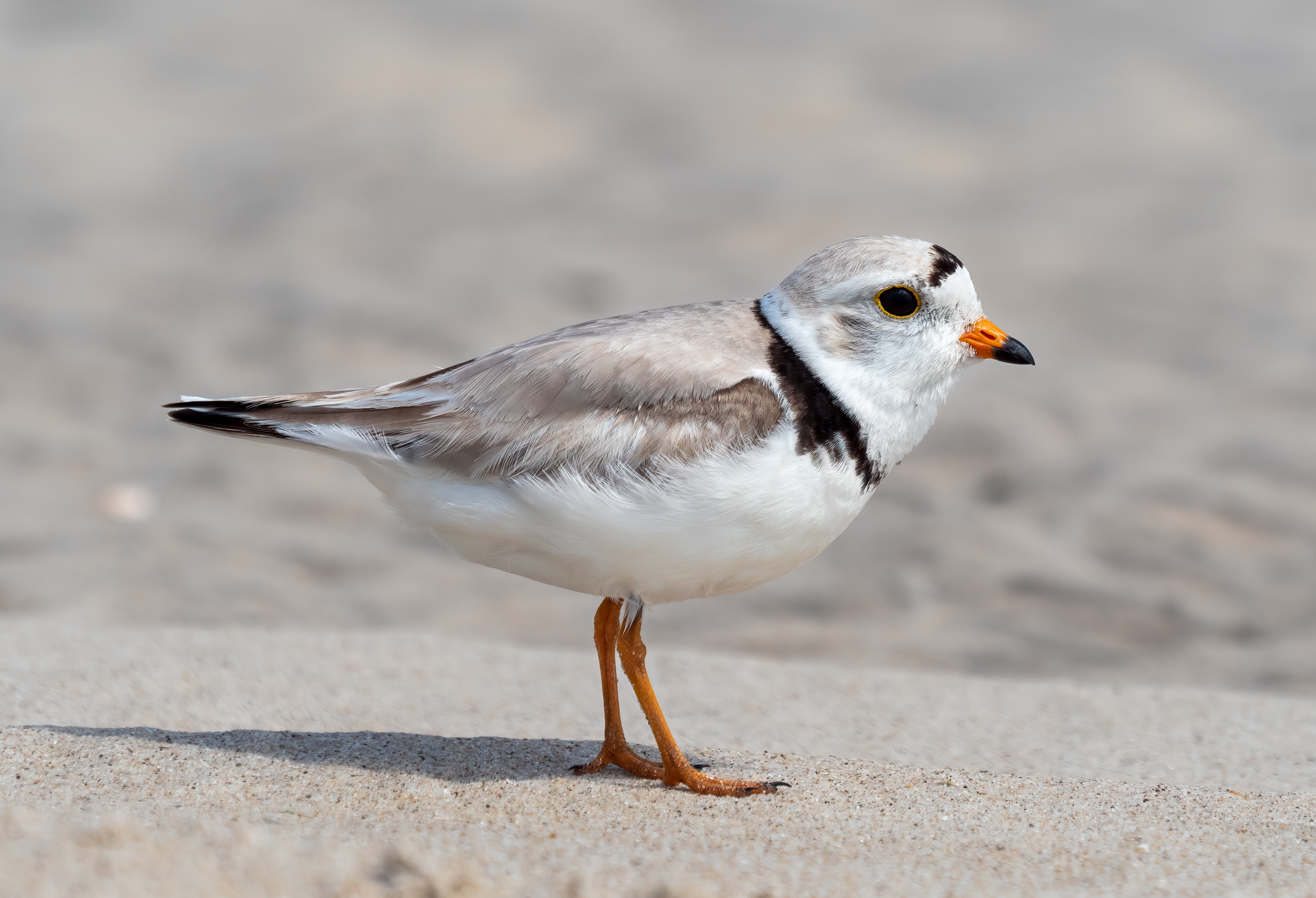
The Piping Plover, a federally threatened bird species which can be found throughout Gateway.

The recreation area is home to a variety of species of the main biological classes, including amphibians, birds, mammals, reptiles, crustaceans, and insects. The species inhabiting these areas have all been able to habituate to the built environments of New York City and New Jersey. The following species can be found throughout all of the different units of the recreation area:

- Amphibians: Eastern Gray Tree Frog.
- Birds: There are over 325 bird species that can be found throughout Gateway National Recreation Area, which provides a good opportunity for bird watching in New York City. Some of the bird species found throughout the area are the American Oystercatcher, Piping Plovers, Osprey, Tree Swallows, American Woodcock, and Killdeer.
- Crustaceans: Atlantic Horseshoe Crab.
- Insects: Monarch Butterfly, Eastern Tent Caterpillar.
- Mammals: Foxes, Harbor Seals, Raccoons, White-Tailed Deer, Muskrat.
- Reptiles: These cold-blooded species are more likely to be seen in the warmer months, when they are more active. Diamondback Terrapins, Eastern Box Turtle, Painted Turtle, Snapping Turtle

== Environmental assessment ==
As the recreation area has locations throughout New York City and New Jersey, there are a variety of factors to be considered in terms of the effects of the surrounding urban environment on the park ecosystem.

- The National Park Service (NPS) conducts a yearly air quality survey that assesses the overall air quality, visibility, and ground ozone levels in the recreation area.
- Due to the proximity of the recreation area to the surrounding built environment, there do exist interactions between wildlife and the human environment. The white-tailed deer population can be found in the Staten Island unit of Gateway. Individuals are cautioned to drive with particular attention at times when deer are most active: dawn, dusk, and during the autumn mating season. Deer can wander into road space and increase the risk of collisions.
- After the discovery of radioactive contamination in Great Kills Park in 2005, public access to parts of the park has been restricted while the NPS takes action to investigate the causes of the contamination and conduct a clean-up of the site. The National Park Service is granted authority by CERCLA to take action against any contamination on grounds under their jurisdiction. The investigation and cleanup effort at Great Kills Park follows the phases outlined by CERCLA.
- Current issues with park soil and geology include the extensive use of artificial material to fill in marshes for development. Some of these artificial soils such as those in Jamaica Bay reduced infiltration to hardened trails and roads. Several of the Gateway sites have been constructed in the early to mid-20th century, during which time the use of artificial fill or waste fill was a common method of filling in wetlands, leveling ground elevation, and increasing the usable land area of parks.
- Water resources: Hydrology in the surrounding marine environments including that of Jamaica Bay has been altered by deep dredging and other engineering modifications.
- Vegetation: Gateway conducts invasive species removal and native species planting at several park sites, which supports native plant growth and promotes biodiversity.

== Preservation of natural features ==
Part of Gateway's mission is to preserve and restore the unique natural features of New York and New Jersey. These are some recent and ongoing restoration projects at Gateway:

- Marsh Restoration - One aim of this project is to bring in native plant life in an attempt to restore what was lost from erosion as well as removing unsuitable fill to restore proper elevations for salt marshes.
- Crooke's Point Restoration - The aim of this project was to reduce the presence of invasive plant species while reintroducing some native species in order to restore the fauna that is native to the Atlantic coastal environment. The goal of this is to provide suitable food and nesting options for native animal species.
- Great Kills Environmental Cleanup - removal of radioactive contamination.
- Spring Creek Environmental Cleanup
- South Shore of Staten Island Coastal Storm Risk Management Project - focuses on recommendations for flood prevention along the South Shore of Staten Island. Some project suggestions include the construction of a vertical flood wall and a buried seawall.

== Gallery ==
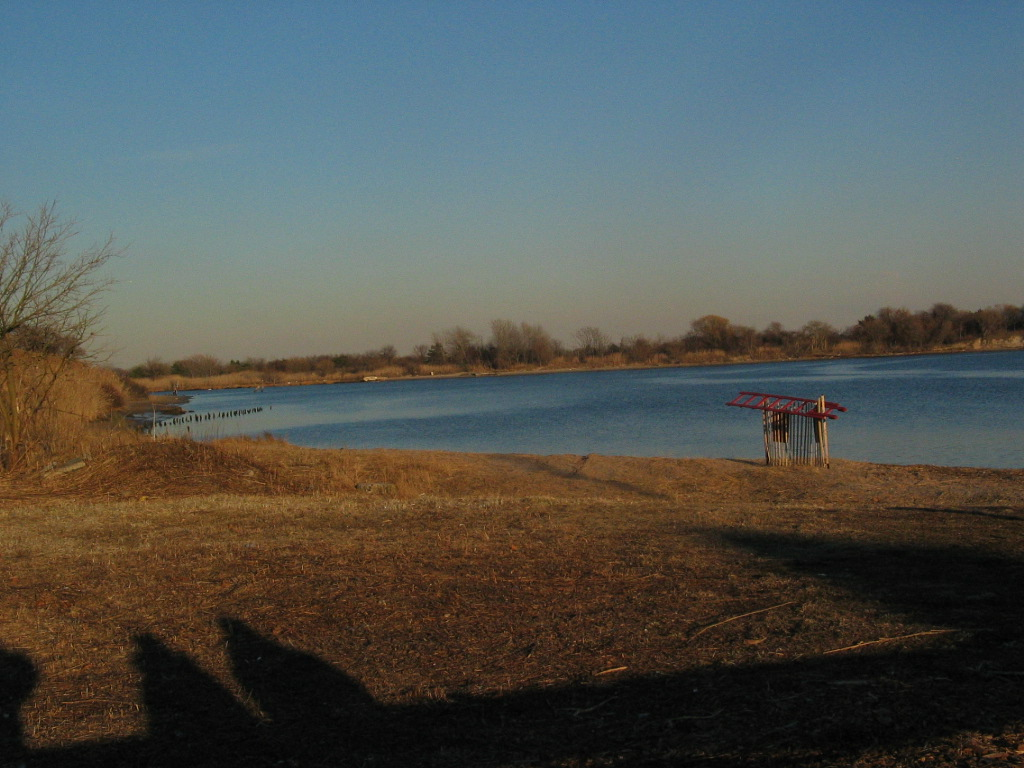
Typical landscapes along Jamaica Bay

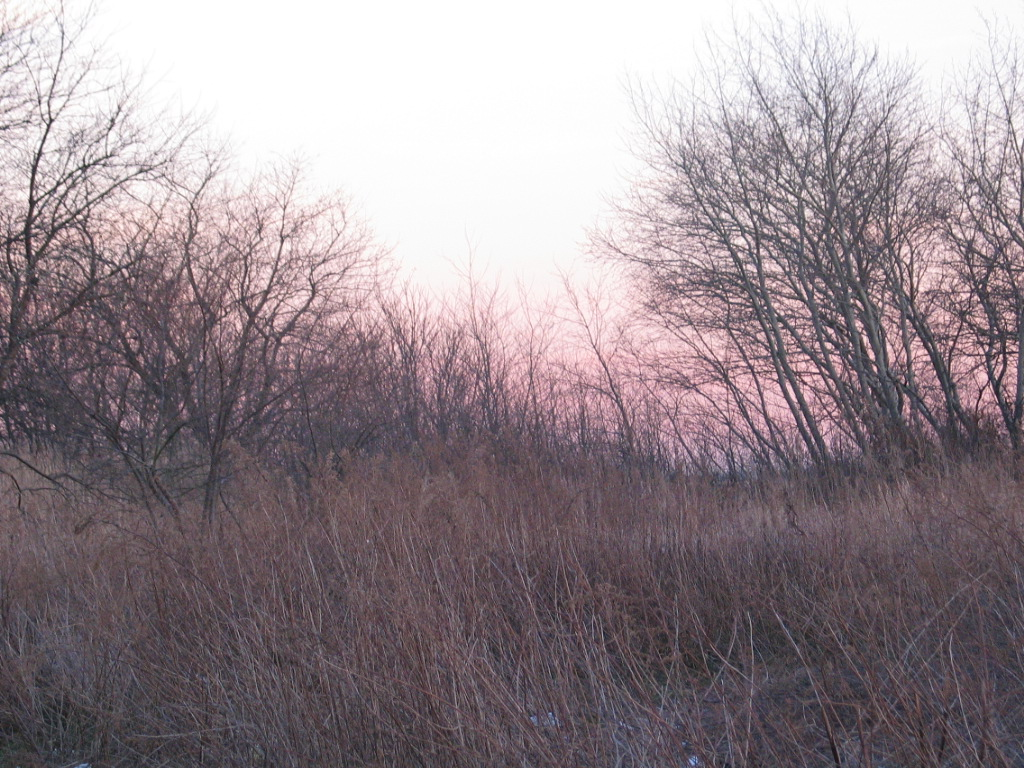
Typical flora of Jamaica Bay shores

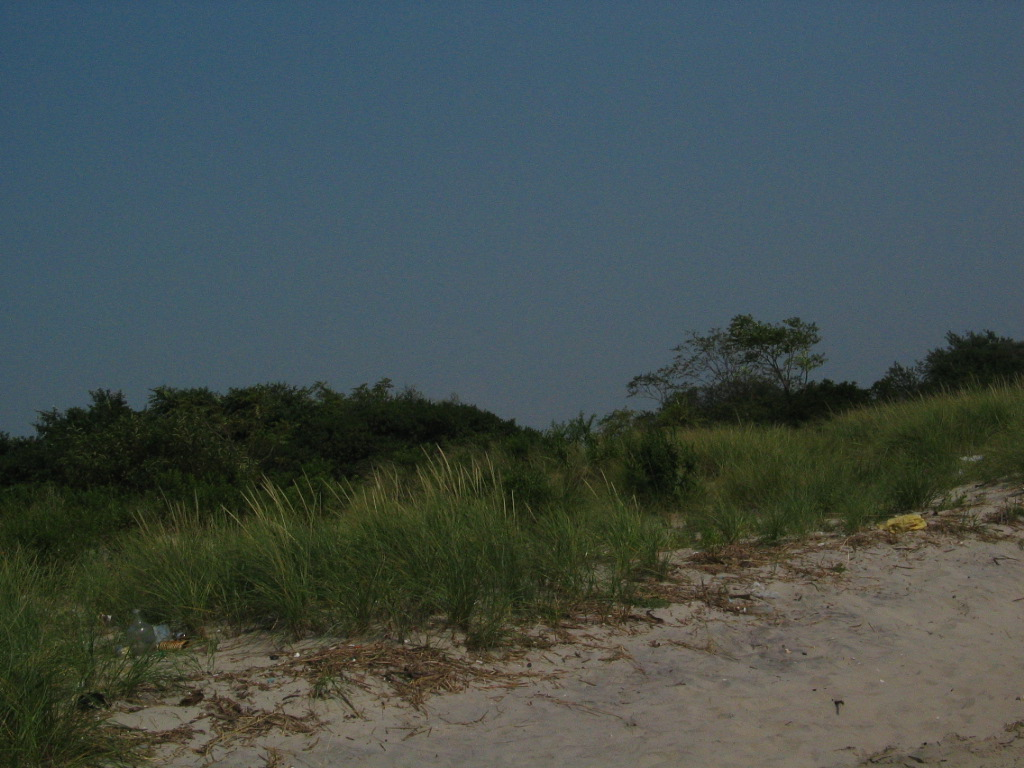
Typical flora of the coastal edge at Gateway

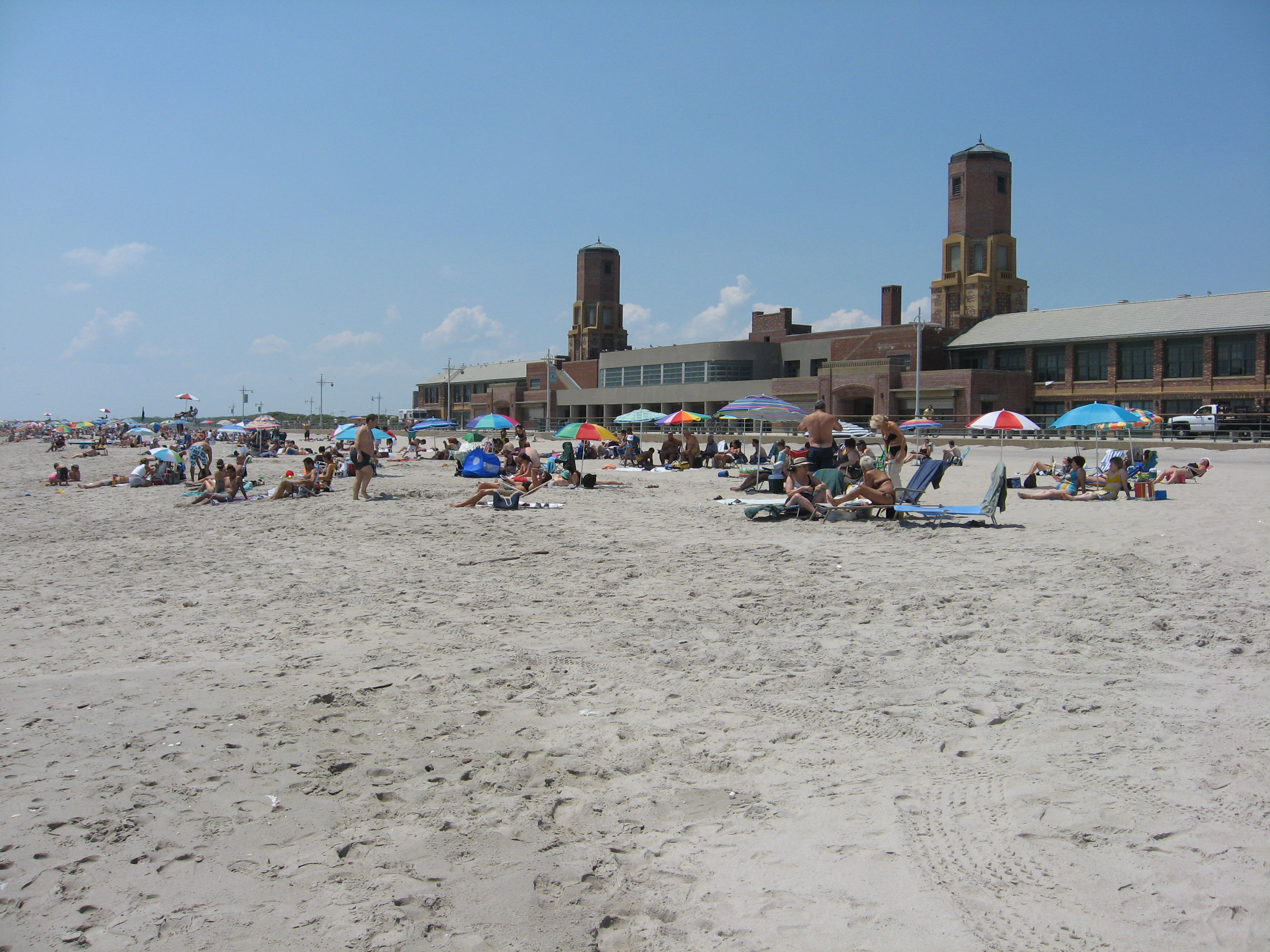
Beach at Jacob Riis Park

== See also ==
- Geography of New York–New Jersey Harbor Estuary
- Legacy of parks
