= List of Nike missile sites =

External videos
- Video tour of SF-88 on YouTube

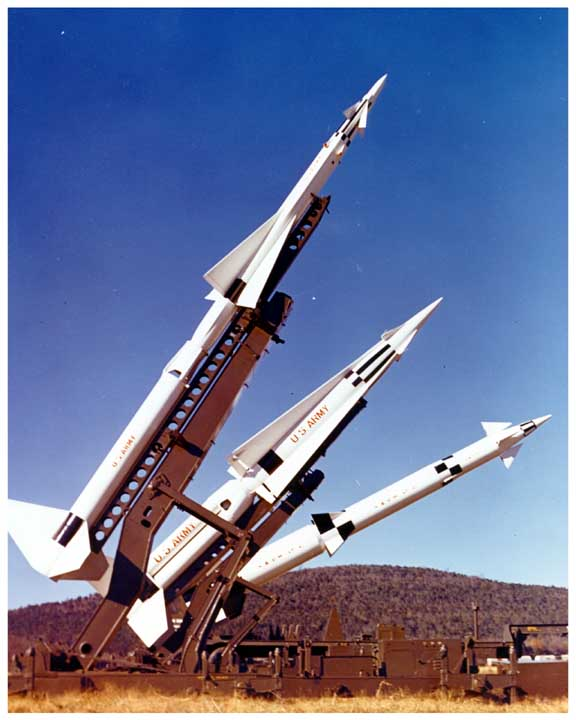
Nike Missile family, From left, MIM-3 Nike-Ajax, MIM-14 Nike-Hercules, LIM-49 Nike-Zeus.

The following is a list of Nike missile sites operated by the United States Army. This article lists sites in the United States, most responsible to Army Air Defense Command; however, the Army also deployed Nike missiles to Europe as part of the NATO alliance, with sites being operated by both American and European military forces. U.S. Army Nike sites were also operational in South Korea, Japan and were sold to Taiwan.

Leftover traces of the approximately 265 Nike missile bases can still be seen around cities across the United States. As the sites were decommissioned, they were first offered to federal agencies. Many were already on Army National Guard bases who continued to use the property. Others were offered to state and local governments, while others were sold to school districts. The leftovers were offered to private individuals. Many Nike sites are now municipal yards, communications, and FAA facilities, probation camps, and even renovated for use as airsoft gaming and military simulation training complexes. Several were obliterated and turned into parks. Some are now private residences. Only a few are intact and preserve the history of the Nike project.

== Belgium ==
General Belgian Nike info: The Nike missile system was operational in the Belgian airforce from 1959 until 1990. It was organized into a Missile Group (the overall staffing); a Support Wing (tech and log support), and 2 (9th and 13th) Missile Wings, each with 4 subordinate units. All Belgian Nike sites were in the 2 ATAF part of then West-Germany. Their defending area was the industrial Ruhr area.

- Blankenheim in the federal state of Nordrhein Westfalen (NRW). Unit: 13th Missile Wing, 51st (B) Squadron 1961–1989. Operating 36x Nike Herc. (10x Nuclear armed) US custodians: 43rd (B) USAAD. Former IFC at 50°26'45"N 06°40'27"E. Former LA at 50°26'29"N 6°41'52"E. Unit disbanded and site closed.
- Düren in NRW. Units: Hq 13th Missile Wing; Missile Support Wing; Group Operations Center and 50th (A) Squadron 1959–1990. Former combined IFC/LA location at 50°41'20"N 06°30'13" E when operating 12 x Nike Ajax missiles. This became the IFC when 50th Sq started Nike Herc ops. 36x Nike Herc. (10x Nuclear-armed) US Custodians: 43rd (C) USAAD. LA then moved to 50°42'44" N 6°32'3"E. Unit disbanded, and the site closed.
- Erle in NRW. Unit: 13th Missile Wing, 57th (D) Squadron 1974–1984. Note: The site was taken over from the Netherlands air force in 1974, becoming ops in 1975 as 13th Missile Wing/57 Sq operating 36x Nike Herc conventional role. The unit was later reassigned to the 9th Missile Wing/57th Sq as it was the most Northern Belgian site. Former IFC demolished. Former LA at 51°44'21"N 6°53'53"E. Unit disbanded, closing the site.
- Euskirchen in NRW. Unit: 13th Missile Wing, 52nd (C) Squadron 1959–1986. Operating 36 x Nike Herc (10x nuclear-armed) US custodians: 43rd (A) USAAD. Former IFC at 50°37'20"N 06°44'37"E. Former LA at 50°37'36" N 6°45'38" E. Unit disbanded, and the site closed.
- Grefrath in NRW. Units: Belgian Group Missiles 1959–1990; staffing and liaison element between the Nike Wings and the Belgian air force staff. Family lodging was at nearby Kempen; Hq 9th Missile Wing; Group Operations Center; 56th Squadron 51°20'56"N 6°20'02"E.
- Hinsbeck in NRW. 9th Missile Wing, 56th (C) Squadron 1962–1989. Operating 36x Nike Herc (10x Nuclear-armed) US custodians: B team 507th USAAD. Former IFC demolished. Former LA at 51°21'56"N 6°17'25" E. Unit disbanded, closing the site.
- Hombroich in NRW. 9th Missile Wing, 55th (B) Squadron 1962–1985. Operating 36x Nike Herc (10x Nuclear-armed) US custodians: C team 507th USAAD. Former IFC at 51°8'27.30"N 6°37'26.49"E. Former LA at 51°9'6"N 6°38'35"E is now a modern art museum. Military family housing 53rd and 55th Squadrons were nearby Grevenbroich. The unit disbanded, and the site closed.
- Kaster in NRW. 9th Missile Wing, 53rd (D) Squadron 1959–1978. Reassigned 13th Missile Wing / 56th Sq 1979–1985. Operating 36x Nike Herc missiles (10x Nuclear-armed) US custodians: 43rd (A) USAAD. Former IFC at 51°01'25"N 06°58'36" E. Former LA at 51°1'24"N 6°29'49"E. Unit disbanded, and the site closed.
- Xanten in NRW. 9th Missile Wing, 54th (A) Squadron 1971–1989. Operating 36x Nike Herc (10x Nuclear-armed) US custodians: A team 507th USAAD. The former basecamp at 51°38'50"N 06°26'31" E was rebuilt into an automotive area. Former IFC at 51°38'30"N 06°22'34" E. Former LA at 51°38'48"N 6°24'33"E. Unit disbanded, and the site closed.

== Denmark ==
Greenland Defense Area (Danish sovereignty): Thule US Airbase was defended by 4 Nike batteries constructed in 1957–1958. Initially, these sites were considered part of the former Army Air Defense Command (ARADCOM) as they were intended to defend the Continental United States. Due to Greenland's climate, the missiles had been stored in underground magazines with a 10-missile capacity. Each battery had 4 magazines, and each magazine 2 missile elevators. 4th Battalion 55th Artillery ceased operations in May 1965, thus ending the Nike missile defense of Thule airbase. The sites have been disused for many years now but the remains are still clearly visible.
- A battery at grid 76°34'6"N 68°49'2"W
- B battery at grid 76°34'23"N 68°38'34"W
- IFC at grid 76°33'32"N 68°43'21"W
- C battery at grid 76°30'7"N 68°32'13"W
- D battery at grid 76°30'40"N 68°53'49"W

As Greenland is Danish and that country refused to host foreign military and nuclear weapons, a bilateral agreement was signed allowing access for all US forces and weaponry in Greenland. This way all Thule batteries could yet be nuclear armed.

Copenhagen Defense Area: Copenhagen was defended by a ring of 4 Nike batteries. At first under Army command but as of 1964 under Air Force command and the batteries redesignated as squadrons 531/2/3/4. Initially Nike Ajax and Hercules operated but later on (1973) only Nike Hercules. All Danish Nike squadrons were operating in conventional role only.

Hq Nike Group and staffing was located at the Avedøre camp, at grid 55°37'59"N 12°26'55"E. Nike Group Operations Control was at the Vestvolden, a fortification at grid 55°41'23"N 12°26'11"E connected with the Karup Air Force Headquarters

Site Name	Missile Type	Defense Area	Site Location	Service Dates	IFC	LA	Air Station
ESK 531	Ajax / Hercules	Copenhagen	Gunderød	1959–1981	55°54′23″N 12°24′48″E	55°54′29″N 12°25′51″E	Avderød 55°55'5"N 12°26'1"E
ESK 532	Ajax / Hercules	Copenhagen	Kongenlunden	1959–1981	55°33′44″N 12°33′59″E	55°34′43″N 12°33′32″E	55°33'52"N 12°34'10"E
ESK 533	Ajax / Hercules	Copenhagen	Sigerslev	1959–1981	55°19′33″N 12°26′56″E	55°18′48″N 12°24′35″E	Store Heddinge 55°18'25"N 12°23'27"E
ESK 534	Ajax / Hercules	Copenhagen	Tune	1959–1981	55°35′20″N 12°10′11″E	55°35′33″N 12°08′37″E	Roskilde Airport 55°35'4"N 12°7'1"E

NIKE sites around the danish capital of Copenhagen
Missile site, Radar site and Air stations Missile launch control center Staf/HQ, training and maintenance

== Germany ==
94th ADA Group, headquartered in Kaiserslautern for most of the Nike-Hercules period had four battalions as follows, with locations:

2/1 ADA headquartered at Wiesbaden Air Base

- A Battery: Wackernheim

- B Battery: Dexheim

- C Battery: Quirnheim

- D Battery: Dichtelbach

5/6 ADA headquartered in Neubruecke

- A Battery: Schoenborn

- B Battery: Wueschheim

- C Battery: Baumholder

- D Battery: Hontheim

2/56 ADA headquartered in Pirmasens

- A Battery: Geinsheim

- B Battery: Landau

- C Battery: Salzwoog

- D Battery: Oberauerbach

3/71 ADA headquartered in Ludwigsburg

- A Battery: Dallau

- B Battery: Grosssachsenheim

- C Battery: Hardheim

- D Battery: Pforzheim

- In Pforzheim (Hagenschieß/Wurmberg), in Baden-Württemberg there is a missile launch site operated by the US-Army until April 1985.

It was part of the Nike-Belt, a defense system which was created to defend Europe against the then newly invented jets. The site fired Nike missiles at potentially incoming jets as part of the Project Nike.

== Italy ==
As of 1959 the Italian commanding unit was: Prima Aerobrigata Intercettori Teleguidati (1st Guided Missile Brigade) at Padua overseeing the sites:
- Bovolone (Verona) 72 Gruppo at grid 45°16'12"N 11°8'29"E Custodians: Team 2–47th US Army Artillery Detachment
- Ceggia (Venice) 57 Gruppo at grid 45°40'22"N 12°40'15"E Custodians: Hq and Team 1–34th USAAD
- Chioggia (Venice) 81 Gruppo at grid 45°10'1"N 12°13'43"E Custodians: Team 3–34th USAAD
- Conselve (Padua) 80 Gruppo at grid 45°9'35"N 11°54'49"E Custodians: Team 2–34th USAAD
- Cordovado (Pordenone) 58 Gruppo at grid 45°49'36"N 12°54'46"E Custodians: Team 4–34th USAAD
- Ca' Tron (Venice) 56 Gruppo at grid 45°34'48"N 12°27'29"E Custodians: 87th USAAD (not activated)
- Zelo (Rovigo) 79 Gruppo at grid 45°2'2"N 11°23'43"E Custodians: Team 3–47th USAAD
- Montichiari (Brescia) 65 Gruppo at grid 45°25'27"N 10°20'43"E
- Monte Toraro (Vicenza) 66 Gruppo at grid 45°52'18"N 11°13'57"E
- Monte Grappa (Prealpi venete) 64 Gruppo at grid VQXH+9J, 32030 Seren del Grappa BL
- Monte Calvarina (Verona) 67 Gruppo at grid 45°30'34"N 11°16'53"E Custodians: Hq and Team 1–47th USAAD
- Monte Pizzoc (Treviso) 59 Gruppo at grid 46°2'30"N 12°20'43"E

The Italian Nike units were initially combined Nike Ajax and Hercules equipped but switched completely over to Nike Hercules in the mid-1970s.

Each site with a US Custodial Team had an on-site load of 10 nuclear warheads ready to be launched at very short notice. The sites were using mixed warheads; meaning always 2 sections nuclear-capable (W31 selectable 20 or 2 kiloton yield) and 1 section only conventional (T-45 High Explosive) armed.

Another 60 spare W31's had been kept in permanent storage at grid 45°28'46"N 11°35'57"E Longare. These were supposed to be airlifted to certain Nike sites in case of deterioration of the international political situation in the world. The logistics train was airlifting by US CH-47's within 6 hrs after receipt of a coded message.

This event actually took place in October 1962 during the Cuban missile crisis when NATO came on full alert.

== Japan ==
On Okinawa, the 30th ADA Brigade was on Okinawa. On Reversion Day, May 15, 1972, all Nike Hercules missile sites were handed over to the JASDF. Battery B,8th Battalion,3rd Air Defense Brigade (now active JGSDF Chinen sub-base) was located on the Chinen peninsula in southern part of the island. The U.S. reverted the islands to Japan on May 15, 1972, setting back a Ryūkyū independence movement that had emerged. A Battery was located on Isikawa Dake (IFC abandoned, 26.452808, 127.835702, LC JASDF Onna Sub-Base), the narrow waist of the island. There was also a battery at Naha, now the airport fire department.

== Netherlands ==
The Royal Netherlands Air Force (RNLAF) contributed to the high level air defense of Germany by the following units:

- 1st Group Guided Weapons (GGW or 'Groep Geleide Wapens' in Dutch), headquarters in Münster-Handorf.

Consisting of the four Squadrons: 118 (nuclear, also Group Operations Center (GOC), 119 (nuclear), 120 (nuclear) and 121 (conventional).

Squadrons located in Vörden, Handorf, Borgholzhausen and Bad Essen

Commissioned 01-11-1959, decommissioned 15-05-1975 and merged with 2GGW into 12 GGW.

- 2nd Group Guided Weapons, headquarters in Schöppingen.

Commissioned 08-04-1963, decommissioned 15-05-1975 and merged with 1GGW into 12GGW;

Consisting of the four Squadrons: 220 (nuclear, also Group Operations Center (GOC), 221 (nuclear), 222 (conventional ) and 223 (nuclear).

Squadrons located in Schöppingen, Erle, Nordhorn and Rheine

- 12 Group Guided Weapons, headquarters in Hesepe.

Commissioned 15-05-1975, decommissioned 01-04-1988;

Consisting of the four Squadrons: 118 (nuclear, also Group Operations Center GOC), 120 (nuclear), 220 (nuclear) en 223 (conventional).

Squadrons located in Vörden (118 sqn), Borgholzhausen (120 sqn), Schöppingen (220 sqn) en Rheine (223 sqn)

- GTMGW Group Technical Materials Guided Weapons (GTMGW, Groep Techniek Materieel Geleide Wapens in Dutch). Next to the operational units this Maintenance Group supplied the higher level maintenance and technical parts supply for the other units

Commissioned 01-02-1964, decommissioned 15-05-1975 and merged with 1GGW and 2GGW into 12GGW; Location Hesepe.

== Norway ==
Oslo Air Defense: Its regional missile air defense was composed of:
- the Norwegian Air Force Nike Battalion annex Logistic and Maintenance unit at Linderud
- A Btry at Asker
- B Btry at Nes
- C Btry at Trogstad
- D Btry at Våler (Våler batteri)

These were covering the Norwegian capital, the former Kolsås HQ Allied Forces Northern Europe (AFNORTH), the Rygge and Gardermoen airbases and the naval base Karljohansvern.

Construction of the Nike batteries started in 1959; becoming limited operational in 1960 and fully operational in 1961.

Initially operating both Nike Ajax and Hercules but later on only Nike Hercules, the Norwegian Nikes were only conventional armed with the T-45 High Explosive warhead.

HQ Nike Battalion at Linderud at grid 59°56'49"N 10°50'37"E

A Battery at Asker at grid 59°52'28"N 10°23'0"E

B Battery at Nes at grid 60°9'22"N 11°23'36"E

C Battery at Trogstad at grid 59°38'0"N 11°20'33"E

YouTube footage http://www.youtube.com/watch?v=hWYAtR-XgTI

D Battery at Våler at grid 59°30'0"N 10°48'6"E

== Turkey ==
- 15th Missile Base Command (15. Füze Üs Komutanlığı), Istanbul.
  - 1st Nike Group Command (1. Nike Grup Komutanlığı), Asian Side - unit disbanded
    - 1st, 3rd & 4th Nike Missile Command (Nike Filo Komutanlığı)
  - 2nd Nike Group Command (2. Nike Grup Komutanlığı), European Side - unit disbanded
    - 2nd, 5th, 7th & 8th Nike Missile Command (Nike Filo Komutanlığı)
    - 6th Nike Missile Command (Nike Filo Komutanlığı), Çanakkale - active

== United States ==
This list is sorted by state. The "Missile type" code indicates the numbers and types of missiles and other installation details. For example, "2AK/18L-H" means the site contained two Nike Ajax magazines (A), located above ground (K), with eight launchers (8L) being converted to Nike Hercules (H). Many listings will have "FDS" following either the control site or launch site heading, which means that the site has gone through the "Formerly-Used Defense Site" program and has been transferred from DoD control to another party. With the exception of Alaska, in which sites were given a specific name, Nike missile sites were designated by a coding system of the Defense Area Name abbreviation; a two-digit number representing the degree from north converted to a number between 01 and 99 (North being 01; East being 25; South being 50; West being 75), and a letter, L = launch site, C = IFC (Integrated Fire Control) site. The Formerly Used Defense Sites (FDS) program processed many former sites and then transferred them out of Defense Department control.

=== Alaska ===
The Alaska Nike sites were under the control of United States Army Alaska (USARAK), rather than Army Air Defense Command.

Anchorage Defense Area: Sites were located around Anchorage to defend the city of Anchorage, Fort Richardson, and Elmendorf AFB. Situated at Fort Richardson near Anchorage, the Command Post hosted the regional air defense command and control facility. Manned by the 4th Missile Battalion (redesignated 1st Missile Battalion), 43d Air Defense Artillery in 1972). Site Point was a dual site, having two complete and independent firing systems (Two fire control systems and four launcher sections each having four launchers each and about 28 Hercules missiles) The damage caused by the Good Friday earthquake in 1964 caused one half of the site to be permanently out of action. The other firing system was restored to active duty and remained so, and was in fact the last Nike site in North America to be closed. Air Defense Command/NORAD radar sites at Fire Island AFS (F-1) and King Salmon AFS (F-3) AK were integrated into the Army Nike operations. Radars used at Fire Island were CPS-6B, FPS-8, CPS-4, FPS-20A, FPS-6B. Nike missile operations continued there until 1979 when the site was closed. Afterwards, the Army Air Defense Command Post was moved to King Salmon. Radars were FPS-93A and in 1982 the FPS-117 was installed. King Salmon Long Range Radar Site is still in use. Fairbanks Defense Area: Sites were installed to replace Anti-Aircraft guns defending the Fairbanks area, which included Fort Wainwright and Eielson AFB. Manned by the 2nd Missile Battalion, 562d Air Defense Artillery. The sites around Fairbanks were inactivated in 1970 and 1971. The USAF radar site at Murphy Dome AFS, AK (F-2) was shared with the Army for Nike missile-defense system. The CPS-6B radar was removed in July 1958, FPS-8 removed 4Q 1960 until the Nike sites were inactivated in 1971.	Nike sites in Alaska

Site name	Missile type	Defense area	Site location	Service dates	Control site condition/owner	Launch site condition/owner
Bay	Nike 2AK/8L-H	Anchorage	Anchorage, Alaska (25 mi NE)	March 1959 – May 1979	The IFC is mostly burned (prior to the fire, the IFC was used as a minimum security prison). Part of the concrete structures and the bases of the radar towers are still standing, and used for paintball wars by the local youth. Buildings are mostly gone, or only standing walls remain. 61°23′53″N 149°51′55″W	Intact Launch remains, no use known. Abandoned and overgrown with trees. 61°24′21″N 149°53′04″W
Point	Nike 4AK/16L-H	Anchorage	Anchorage, Alaska (10 mi SW)	April 1959 – May 1971	Obliterated; concrete slabs remain. 61°09′18″N 150°03′21″W	Abandoned. Buildings torn down, launch pads consist of concrete slabs and bunkers. Land was transferred to the Municipality of Anchorage, and has been converted to a park. One of the Launch Bunkers has been converted to a Cross Country Ski Chalet with a large parking lot, and the other three Launch Bunkers are used for storage. 61°09′31″N 150°02′07″W
Summit	Nike 2AK/8L-H	Anchorage	Anchorage, Alaska (25 mi NE/Chugach Mountains)	May 1959 – May 1979	Intact Army ownership, best preserved Alaskan Site. It has been in use as a secured communications site for various federal agencies, including BLM, FAA, FCC, FBI, IRS, and others. It is also used occasionally for communications exercises supporting various US Army operations. There are two adjacent ski recreation areas. Under restoration since 2009. Guided public tours are available June–September through a local non-profit organization. Site Summit is listed in the National Register of Historic Places. 61°15′29″N 149°31′42″W	Intact Army ownership, best preserved Alaskan Site; 61°14′52″N 149°32′54″W
Jig	Nike 2AK/8L-H	Fairbanks	Eielson AFB, Alaska (5 mi S)	March 1959 – May 1970	Obliterated Private ownership. Nothing remains except large open area. 64°32′04″N 146°59′35″W	Intact, Private ownership, 1 launcher used to store dynamite. Many tractor-trailers on site. 64°31′38″N 146°57′51″W
Love	Nike 2AK/8L-H	Fairbanks	Fairbanks, Alaska (10 mi NW)	March 1959 – May 1971	Obliterated, State of Alaska control, demolished 64°59′02″N 147°53′08″W	Obliterated, State of Alaska control, demolished 64°59′00″N 147°51′16″W
Mike	Nike 2AK/8L-H	Fairbanks	Eielson AFB, Alaska (10 mi SE)	March 1959 – May 1970	Obliterated, Army ownership, demolished 64°34′55″N 146°45′04″W	Army ownership on Ft Wainwright property, The site is overgrown with vegetation, Nike launch buildings are relatively intact. 64°35′13″N 146°43′45″W
Peter	Nike 2AK/8L-H	Fairbanks	Eielson AFB, Alaska (15 mi E)	March 1959 – May 1971	Obliterated, Army terrorism training site, demolished but support structure for target acquisition radar still intact. 64°39′55″N 146°44′28″W	Army ownership on Ft Wainwright property, Army terrorism training site. The site is overgrown with vegetation, Nike launch buildings are relatively intact. 64°40′27″N 146°45′03″W
Tare	Nike 2AK/8L-H	Fairbanks	Newman, Alaska (20 mi S)	March 1959 – May 1971	Obliterated, Corps of Engineers control, demolished 64°47′37″N 147°11′19″W	Partially intact, Launch remains, serves as administration facility for Chena River Lakes Recreation Area; 64°45′28″N 147°13′08″W

=== California ===
Los Angeles Defense Area (LA): Los Angeles was defended by a ring of 16 Nuclear sites. Headquarters sites were located at Signal Hill, Long Beach, Fort MacArthur, and at the Birmingham Army Hospital. As indicated by the number of sites, Los Angeles, with its aerospace industries, received extensive air defenses. Initially manned by the 1st Missile Battalion, 56th Artillery, later by the 4th Missile Battalion, 65th Artillery. Beginning in the fall of 1958, the LA-40 and LA-43 Nike sites were manned by the 720th AAA Missile Battalion of the California Army National Guard. Eventually, California National Guard units assumed responsibilities for manning the other sites. In 1968, the Army deactivated LA-94. LA-29 closed 3 years later.

Army Air-Defense Command Post (AADCP) LA-45DC was established at San Pedro Hill AFS, CA in 1960 for Nike missile command-and-control functions. The site was initially an AN/FSG-l Missile-Master Radar Direction Center. It was later equipped with the AN/TSQ-51 "Missile Mentor" solid-state computer system.

LA-45DC was integrated with the USAF Air Defense Command/NORAD Semi Automatic Ground Environment (SAGE) air defense radar network as Site RP-39 / Z-39 The AADCP was inactivated 1 Sep 1974 along with the remaining Nike Hercules sites.

San Francisco Defense Area (SF): San Francisco was defended by 12 Nike sites: SF-08, SF-09, SF-25, SF-31, SF-37, SF-51, SF-59, SF-87, SF-88, SF-89, SF-91 and SF-93. Its defenders included both Regular Army and National Guard units. Sites SF-87 and SF-93 were deactivated in 1971. Three years later, the U.S. Army Air Defense Command deactivated the remaining missile batteries. When the Army abandoned the launch area of SF-88 at Fort Barry in 1974, the National Park Service assumed custody of the site, incorporating it into the Golden Gate National Recreation Area. Through the efforts of various volunteer groups, as of 1995, this is the only Nike site in the country that has been preserved and is open for public viewing.

Army Air-Defense Command Post (AADCP) SF-90DC was established at Mill Valley AFS, CA in 1960 for Nike missile command-and-control functions. The site was equipped with the AN/GSG-5(V) BIRDIE solid-state computer system.

SF-90DC was integrated with the USAF Air Defense Command/NORAD Semi Automatic Ground Environment (SAGE) air defense radar network as Site P-38 / Z-38 The AADCP was inactivated in mid-1971.

Travis AFB Defense Area (T): Established to defend the USAF Strategic Air Command, later Military Airlift Command base. The 436th Anti-Aircraft Artillery Battalion was active by 1955. The 436th AAAB was redesignated as an antiaircraft artillery missile battalion on 5 January 1957 and subsequently occupied four Nike Ajax sites, which went to 1st Missile Battalion, 61st Artillery on 1 September 1958. Controlling the SAMs was the 29th Artillery Group (Air Defense). During the late 1960s and early 1970s, the Travis battalion assumed responsibility for the remaining active batteries guarding the entire San Francisco region. Inactivated by 1974.

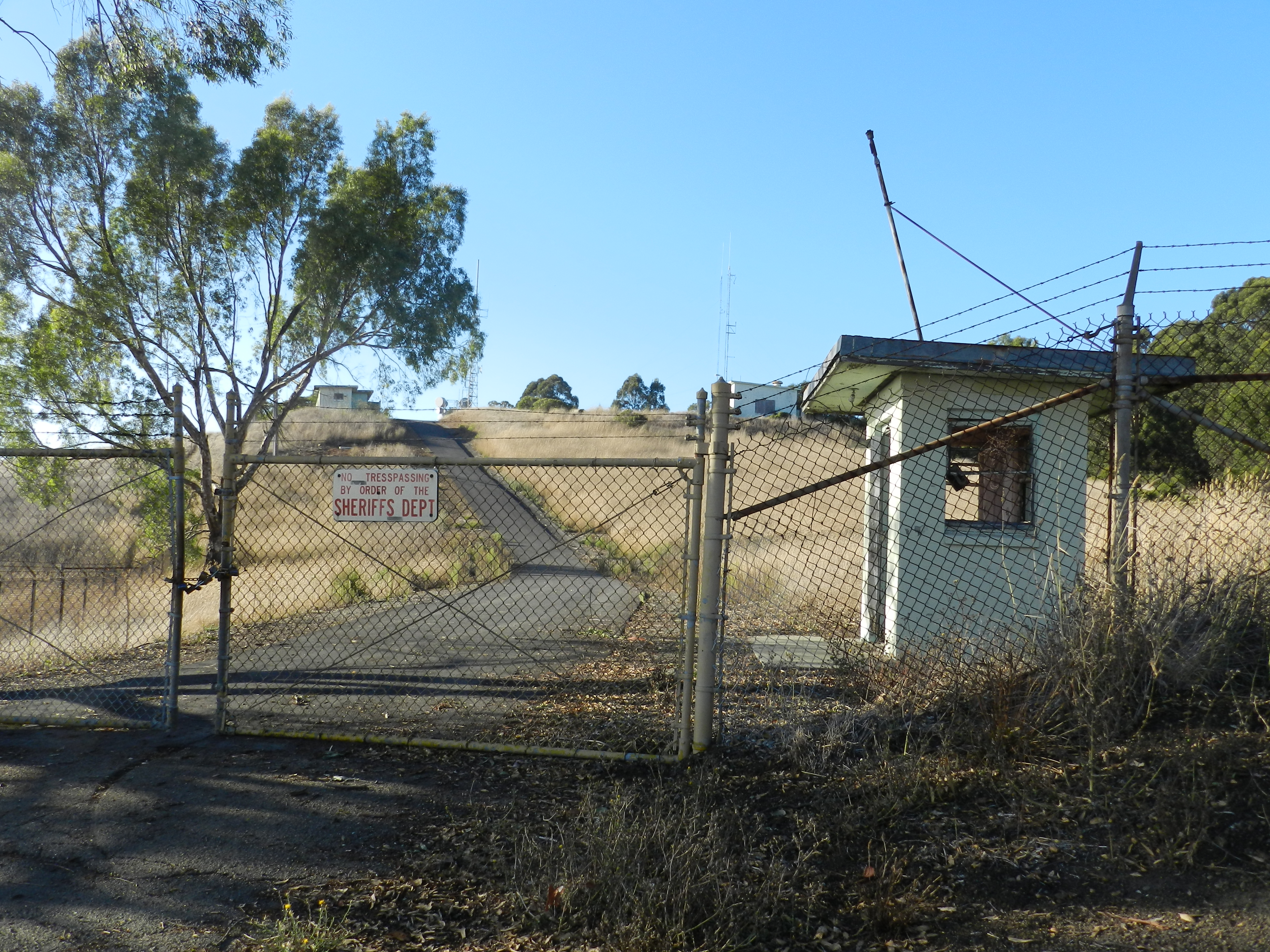
SF-31 Nike site, San Leandro, California

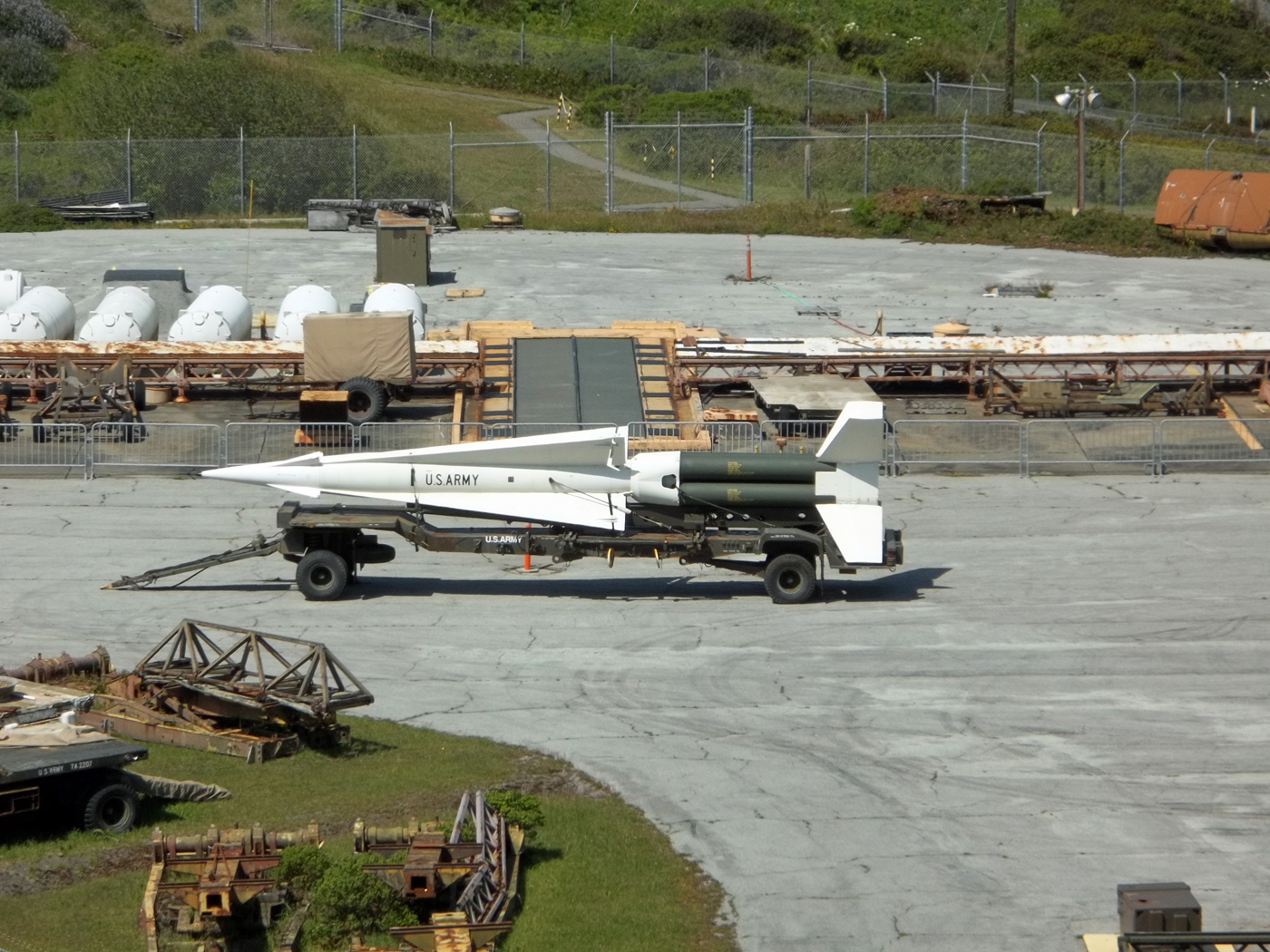
Missile on transporter at SF-88, Sausalito

Site Name	Missile Type	Defense Area	Site Location	Service Dates	Control Site condition/owner	Launch Site condition/owner
LA-04	Nike 1B, 2C/18H, 30A/11L-U, (10L-H)	Los Angeles	Mount Gleason (Angeles National Forest)/ Palmdale, California	1956 – April 1974	Abandoned, replanted with pines. No evidence of former IFC site. 34°22′32″N 118°10′33″W	Owned by State of California. Rebuilt as Los Angeles County prison camp 34°22′41″N 118°09′03″W
LA-09	Nike 1B, 2C/30A/12L-A	Los Angeles	Mount Disappointment/ Barley Flats (Angeles National Forest.	1956–1961	Destroyed by fire, former LA County Probation Department work camp. On mountain peak, leveled flat for the base. Some buildings remain, in abandoned condition. Accessible to the public by hiking. No radar towers. 34°14′48″N 118°06′17″W	Obliterated, LA Sheriff's Department Air Station; 34°16′42″N 118°04′32″W
LA-14	Nike 2B/20A/8L-A	Los Angeles	South El Monte, California	1956–1961	Obliterated, Athletic Field of Rio Hondo Junior College. Fire Control largely preserved and accessible via hiking trail. 34°01′05″N 118°02′17″W	Obliterated. Former missile pads still visible, apparently being used as a storage yard. Most of area now redeveloped into tennis courts, park area. 34°02′37″N 118°03′32″W
LA-29	Nike 1B, 2C/18H, 30A/12L-UA, (7L-H)	Los Angeles	Brea/Puente Hills, California	1958 – June 1971	Private ownership. Site cleared and redeveloped on top of ridge. One old foundation remains of IFC, also some old roads not severely deteriorated Appears to be a radio tower, transmitter site and a large water tank on the site. 33°57′19″N 117°53′44″W	Private ownership, fenced. Launch site abandoned, appears to be above-ground site with launchers located within berms. Concrete foundations badly deteriorated, only some building foundations remain. Much broken concrete lying around site. Large number of commercial bee hives. 33°57′34″N 117°53′10″W
LA-32	Nike 1B1C/12H, 20A/8L-U	Los Angeles	Garden Grove/Stanton, California	1956 – Mar 1974	Obliterated, Private ownership, Light Industrial park 33°47′27″N 118°00′43″W	In highly urbanized area. CAArNG, 458th MASH facility. Nike launch facilities obliterated by construction 33°47′32″N 118°00′10″W
LA-40	Nike 1B, 2C/30A/12L-A	Los Angeles	Long Beach Airport, California	1956–1963	Obliterated. Hotel and commercial development. Location now a parking deck. 33°48′32″N 118°08′08″W	Obliterated, Kilroy Airport Center; 33°48′32″N 118°08′26″W
LA-43	Nike 2B/12H, 20A/8L-UA	Los Angeles	Fort MacArthur, California (upper)	1955 – Mar 1974	Located at Battery Leary, Merriam, Upper Reservation, Ft. MacArthur. Fenced-in area, redeveloped with new landscaping. No sign of IFC. 33°42′43″N 118°17′45″W	Intact, City of LA, White Point Park. Double-magazine site with Nike Assembly building evident, also concrete launcher foundations. Launch site roads still in place, overlaid by park facilities. 33°43′00″N 118°18′51″W
LA-55	Nike 2B/12H, 20A/8L-U	Los Angeles	Rancho Palos Verdes, California	1956 – Mar 1974	Obliterated, City of Rancho Palos Verdes, Del Cerro Park; 33°45′27″N 118°22′06″W	Missile launch pads intact. Used as City of Rancho Palos Verdes storage area. 33°44′42″N 118°24′18″W
LA-57	Nike 1B, 2C/30A/12L-A	Los Angeles	Redondo Beach/ Torrance, California	1956–1963	Obliterated, City of Redondo Beach, Hopkins Wilderness Park; 33°49′45″N 118°22′27″W	In highly industrial area. Missile site partially intact, used by City of Torrance, Torrance Airport Civil Air Patrol. 33°47′48″N 118°19′48″W
LA-70	Nike 1B, 2C/30A/12L-A	Los Angeles	Hyperion/Playa del Rey, California (Shared with LA-73)	1956–1963	Obliterated, FDS, vacant lot just west of LAX runway 6R; 33°56′48″N 118°22′18″W	Nike launch facilities obliterated. Redeveloped into City of LA Department of Airports, Jet Pets Animal Services; 33°57′08″N 118°26′18″W
LA-73	Nike 1B, 2C/30A/12L-A	Los Angeles	Playa del Rey/LAX, California (Shared with LA-70)	1956–1963	Obliterated, Apartments, commercial use 33°57′33″N 118°25′59″W	Launcher area was destroyed/obliterated in the early 1990s when Westchester Parkway was constructed. Also used by City of LA Department of Airports, Jet Pets Animal Service. 33°57′08″N 118°26′18″W
LA-78	Nike 1B, 2C/18H, 30A/12L-U	Los Angeles	Malibu, California	1963 – Mar 1974	Obliterated, no evidence of existence at end of former access road. 34°04′41″N 118°39′20″W	Double-battery Nike. Concrete launcher foundations partially intact, Microwave/Communication Facility. Launchers probably intact. The former crew barracks are now used for county fire station personnel and the old launch bays appear to be used for storage. 34°03′35″N 118°38′46″W
LA-88	Nike 1B, 2C/18H, 30A/11L-U	Los Angeles	Chatsworth, Oat Mountain, California	1957 – Mar 1974	Partially intact, administration buildings at entrance standing, with what appear to be military radio towers. Most buildings razed and rebuilt as a Relay site. Many foundations remain with broken concrete spread around area, roads in deteriorating condition. 34°19′35″N 118°35′13″W	Below-ground Triple-magazine Nike-Hercules site built up on high ridge. Largely intact and abandoned. Buildings in poor condition, some roofless, some not. Still fenced with closed access gate. Site has been utilized by the LAPD SWAT team for training. 34°18′41″N 118°36′31″W
LA-94	Nike 1B, 2C/18H-30A/12L-UA	Los Angeles	Los Pinetos/Santa Clarita, California	1955 – Nov 1968	Intact, LA County Fire Camp #9 and GTE cellular relay station. On high ridge, elevation 3,750'. All buildings in use in excellent condition. Radar towers visible on nearby mountain peak. 34°21′09″N 118°24′40″W	Double-battery Nike launch area on top of tall ridge. Is fenced in, with a "No Trespassing" sign, guard shack and many buildings in good repair. Now US Forest Service facility. Magazines probably in good condition, launch area being used for outside storage. 34°20′55″N 118°24′29″W
LA-96	Nike 1B, 2C/18H, 30A/12L-U, (8L-H)	Los Angeles	Lake Balboa(formerly Van Nuys) / Encino	1956 – 1968	Located on top of a mountain in the middle of the city. San Vicente Peak, has been turned into a Cold War memorial park. Santa Monica Mountains Conservancy, San Vicente Mountain Park. Buildings, some radar towers. 34°07′43″N 118°30′46″W	In highly urban area. After being closed by the Army it was established as an Air Force installation, the Sepulveda Air National Guard Station. On that date, jurisdiction, control, and authority was transferred to the California Air National Guard. A section of the launch area is used by the CAANG, 261st Combat Communication Squadron. The site also hosts Squadron 3 of the Civil Air Patrol's California Wing. Concrete launch pads still visible at Woodley Ave & Victory Blvd.. 34°11′06″N 118°28′56″W
LA-98	Nike 1B, 2C/30A/12L-A	Los Angeles	Magic Mountain (Angeles National Forest) / Lang (Santa Clarita), California	1955 – Dec 1968	Microwave relay site. 34°23′11″N 118°19′45″W	Private owner, construction use. Most of launch site turned into a quarry. 34°25′53″N 118°22′32″W
SF-08; SF-09	Nike 1B, 2C/30A/12L-A	San Francisco	San Pablo Ridge, California (SF-08 and SF-09 shared facilities)	1955 – Jun 1963	Obliterated, Wildcat Canyon Regional Park. 37°56′56″N 122°17′28″W	Obliterated, Wildcat Canyon Regional Park. Some berms still visible. 37°55′30″N 122°15′44″W
SF-25	Nike 1B, 2C/30A/12L-A	San Francisco	Rocky Ridge, California	1956 – July 1959	Partially Intact, Las Trampas Regional Park and microwave communications facility 37°48′57″N 122°03′44″W	Redeveloped, TRACOR Aerospace, Expendable Technology Center, Las Trampas Regional Park Office; 37°48′45″N 122°02′33″W
SF-31	Nike 2B/12H, 20A/8L-U	San Francisco	Lake Chabot/ Castro Valley, California	1956 – Mar 1974	Intact, Communications Facility Partially. Buildings, some radar towers. 37°43′25″N 122°07′08″W	Intact, East Bay Regional Park District, Lake Chabot Park, Department of Public Safety, service yard. Missile pads used as part of storage yard and parking lot. 37°43′17.5″N 122°05′56.2″W
SF-37	Nike 1B, 2C/30A/12L-A	San Francisco	Coyote Hills/ Newark, California	1955 – Mar 1963	Redeveloped, East Bay Regional Park District, Coyote Hills Regional Park Alameda County Sheriff's Department radio transmitter 37°32′24″N 122°05′03″W	Obliterated, Coyote Hills Regional Park. Launch site buildings bulldozed, dumped into the magazines, magazines sealed shut, soiled over & the whole area re-graded in the early 1970s to make it look like a natural area again, and they did a very thorough job. 37°33′32″N 122°05′46″W
SF-51	Nike 2B/12H, 20A/8L-U	San Francisco	Milagra/ Pacifica, California	1956 – Mar 1974	National Park Service, Sweeney Ridge (GGNRA). Buildings removed; foundations and radar tower concrete bases remain. 37°36′48″N 122°27′32″W	Obliterated, Milagra Ridge (GGNRA). Launch pad doors still visible, but concrete has been covered by soil and is now a grassy area. 37°38′22″N 122°28′44″W
SF-59	Nike 1B, 2C/30A/12L-A	San Francisco	Fort Funston/ Mount San Bruno, California	1956 – Mar 1963	FDS. Redeveloped into communications site. No evidence of IFC. 37°41′32″N 122°26′52″W	Partially Intact on mountain top, Fort Funston Park Picnic Area. Triple-magazine Nike Missile launching concrete pad now a parking lot for the Fort Funston hang gliding area. Buildings in use by park personnel. 37°42′53″N 122°30′06″W
SF-87	Nike 2B/12H, 20A/8L-U	San Francisco	Fort Cronkhite/ Sausalito, California	1955 – June 1971	On mountain peak. Partially intact, buildings, some radar towers, tourist area, Golden Gate National Recreation Area; 37°49′39″N 122°29′56″W	Obliterated. Redeveloped into Marine Mammal Center. 37°50′06″N 122°31′51″W
SF-88	Nike 2B/12H, 20A/8L-U	San Francisco	Fort Barry/ Sausalito, California	Mar 1958 – Mar 1974	On high mountain peak. Intact but decaying and falling apart, NPS-GGNRA, camp site, YMCA facility. Most buildings intact and in use, some radar towers. 37°50′32″N 122°31′55″W	Part of the Golden Gate National Recreation Area) across the Golden Gate from San Francisco, has been preserved as a Nike museum, complete with missiles (inert). This site was given intact to the National Park Service in 1974 after it was decommissioned for use as a legacy of the Nike program. It is open to the public on Fridays and Saturdays from 12:30 to 3:30 pm. The first Saturday of every month is an "open house" with veterans of the NIKE program at the site. The SF-88L site has been restored by volunteers and National Park Service employees to the condition it was during the 1960s, complete with signage and various pieces of equipment such as the radars and control vans that would have been stationed on hills overlooking the site. One of the two missile magazines has been restored and has a working elevator and launch rail for the inert missiles. Site SF-88 is listed in the National Register of Historic Places as part of the Fort Barry Historic District. 37°49′36″N 122°31′39″W
SF-89	Nike 1B, 2C/30A/12L-A	San Francisco	Fort Winfield Scott, California	1955 – Mar 1963	Partially intact, buildings being used, no evidence of radar towers. TV transmitter site. 37°45′28″N 122°27′28″W	Intact, salvage yard. Nike launch magazines abandoned and partially covered by a layer of soil, used for open-air storage. The adjacent buildings are used by an EOD unit. 37°47′32″N 122°28′24″W
SF-91	Nike 1B, 2C/30A/12L-A	San Francisco	Angel Island, California	1955–1961	The IFC on the top of Mt. Livermore Angel Island in San Francisco Bay has been permanently removed. The former radar site has been restored to its natural condition and is now enjoyed as one of the best views of the region by hikers and picnickers. 37°51′41″N 122°25′50″W	Intact, NPS-GGNRA, Angel Island State Park. Three launch areas. This is an early Ajax-only site that was never converted to Hercules. The mountain between the launcher and the IFC was "notched" in three places to allow the Missile Tracking Radar to acquire the missile while sitting on the launcher. The three underground magazines are existent and in reasonably good condition. The area is off-limits to visitors at Angel Island State Park. 37°51′23″N 122°25′21″W
SF-93	Nike 3B/18H, 30A/12L-U	San Francisco	San Rafael, California	1957 – June 1971	Harry P. Barbier Memorial Park. Two round ground pads, one square ground pad, and one tower with cyclone fence around the top. Nothing else is left. 37°59′52″N 122°30′09″W	Redeveloped into Marin County Waste Water Treatment Plant. Launch "pits" used for reservoirs for the waste treatment plant. Doors have been completely covered with dirt. 38°01′26″N 122°31′15″W
T-10	Nike 3B/18H, 30A/12L-U	Travis AFB	Elmira, California	1958 – Mar 1974	Redeveloped as multiple-family housing. Part of the facility exists to the west, with outlines of radar towers visible. Used primarily as a junkyard. 38°18′58″N 121°52′16″W	Redeveloped, Private ownership. Several buildings were reused as warehouses. Nike launching pads are visible, probably all sealed shut. Looks as if it is being used as a storage/junkyard. 38°19′02″N 121°53′37″W
T-33	Nike AG/12A/12L-A	Travis AFB	Dixon/Lambie, California	1957 – Jan 1959	Partially Intact, State of California Department of Health Services. Some buildings are in use, but no radar towers. 38°13′07″N 121°50′51″W	Redeveloped, Private ownership, light industrial storage yard. 38°13′19″N 121°51′26″W
T-53	Nike 1B, 2C/30A/12L-A	Travis AFB	Potrero Hills, California	1958 – Jan 1959	Intact, Explosives Technology. Buildings in use, no radar towers visible. 38°12′32″N 121°56′31″W	The property was transferred from the Army to the Air Force on 31 Jul 1964. On that date, it was designated as Potrero Hills Storage Annex; and jurisdiction, control, and accountability were assigned to Travis AFB. Now under private ownership, Explosives Technology. Launch doors are probably sealed shut but visible along with Nike concrete launching pads. 38°12′10″N 121°56′08″W
T-86	Nike 1B, 2C/30A/12L-UA, (8L-U)	Travis AFB	Fairfield / Cement Hills, California	1958 – June 1971	Private ownership. Mostly intact, some IFC buildings being used for transmitter support with large radio towers on site. Radar tower outlines are visible. 38°17′57″N 121°59′57″W	Redeveloped Solano County Detention Center and Animal Shelter, FSUSD bus yard. Launch doors are probably sealed shut but visible along with Nike concrete launching pads. Administrative Area buildings intact deteriorated. 38°16′34″N 122°00′08″W

=== Connecticut ===
Bridgeport Defense Area (BR): Regular Army units manned these sites after initial activation during 1956 and 1957, with the Guard assuming duties in the waning years. Headquarters facilities were located in Bridgeport. Only site BR-04 was converted from Nike Ajax to Hercules. This battery would become integrated into the New England Defense Area before deactivating in 1971. Hartford Defense Area (HA): Operational in 1956, these sites were first manned by Regular Army and later by Guard Units. Units from the Bridgeport Defense Area assisted in operating the Plainville site. Sites HA-48 and HA-08 were converted to fire the Nike Hercules missile and remained operational until 1968 and 1971, respectively. Both defense areas appear to have been manned by 2nd Battalion, 55th Artillery (Air Defense) at times between 1958 and 1964.	Connecticut Nike Missile Sites

Site Name	Missile Type	Defense Area	Site Location	Service Dates	Control Site condition/owner	Launch Site condition/owner
BR-04	Nike 3B/18H, 30A/12L-U	Bridgeport	Ansonia, Connecticut	1957 – June 1971	US Forest Service Insect & Disease Lab. Some buildings remain in use, most razed along with radar towers. In single-family home subdivision built since inactivation of Nike Fire Control Site. Some old roads still exist in the abandoned part of the facility, but no evidence of radar towers. 41°20′23″N 073°02′42″W	Private ownership. Now part of a horse farm. Most buildings are still there, launch magazines filled in, concrete pads obliterated. Horses occupy the Assembly building. 41°21′02″N 073°02′56″W
BR-15	Nike 1B, 2C/30A/12L-A	Bridgeport	West Haven, Connecticut	1956 – Sep 1971	CTANG(CT Air National Guard), Communications/Radar site. Known as Orange Air National Guard Station. Home now to the 103rd Air Control Squadron. The site totally redeveloped, and no Nike site buildings remain. 41°16′04″N 072°59′31″W	Obliterated. Part of Town of Westhaven, Parks and Recreation Department "Nike State Park"; 41°16′18″N 072°58′47″W
BR-17	Nike 1B, 2C/30A/12L-A	Bridgeport	Milford, Connecticut	1956–1963	Town of Milford, board of education. IFC buildings are being reused in reasonable condition. Parts of the facility exist but are abandoned, lot of vegetation reclaiming the facility. Some radio towers but no evidence of radar. 41°13′41″N 073°00′57″W	Private ownership redeveloped into single-family housing. 41°14′24″N 073°00′17″W
BR-65	Nike 1B, 2C/30A/12L-A	Bridgeport	Fairfield, Connecticut	1956 – Mar 1961	Town of Fairfield, Fire Training and Canine Center. Completely rebuilt, with no evidence of a Fire Control Site or radar towers. 41°07′42″N 073°15′01″W	Redeveloped into South Pine Creek Park. Launch area is now a soccer field. 41°07′29″N 073°15′48″W
BR-73	Nike 1B, 2C/30A/12L-A	Bridgeport	Westport, Connecticut	1956–1963	Town of Westport, Westport/Weston Health District, Bayberry. Some IFC buildings still in-use, part of site also used by Westport Observatory also using old IFC buildings. Two radar towers still standing and evident, one of which now functions as the base for the Westport Observatory telescope. Much of site overgrown with vegetation. 41°10′16″N 073°19′43″W	Obliterated. Site redeveloped as Bedford Middle School in 2001. Launch area was immediately north of current school building. 41°09′35″N 073°19′48″W
BR-94	Nike 2B, 1C	Bridgeport	Shelton, Connecticut	1957 – Mar 1961	Now owned by Jones Family Farm and used in their wine production. In what turned out to be an ironic twist, the land was initially commandeered by the Army — and then was bought back by the family after the Joneses won a competitive bid against developers when the Army no longer needed the site. 41°19′40″N 073°11′01″W	Redeveloped into "Nike Recreation Fields", Town of Shelton. Baseball fields, recreation Halls, Tennis courts, playground etc. 41°18′29″N 073°10′21″W
HA-08	Nike 1B, 2C/18H, 30A/10L-U	Hartford	East Windsor, Connecticut	1956 – June 1971	"New Testament Church". No evidence of IFC site. 41°52′12″N 072°35′39″W	Redeveloped into USAR Center. Nike launch site totally obliterated. 41°53′30″N 072°36′10″W
HA-25	Nike 1B, 2C/30A/12L-A	Hartford	Manchester, Connecticut	1956 – Jan 1961	Town of Manchester, Recreation Center. Also lots of single-family housing. No evidence of IFC site. 41°45′05″N 072°32′02″W	Redeveloped into Electric Lighting Company. Nike launch site overgrown with vegetation. 41°44′14″N 072°30′43″W External videos: Video tour of HA-25
HA-36	Nike 1B, 2C/30A/12L-A	Hartford	Portland, Connecticut	1956–1963	Meshomasic State Forest Abandoned, overgrown, some demolished buildings visible from ground. 41°38′18″N 072°32′42″W	FDS, Abandoned and overgrown. Appears to have been bulldozed over and covered with soil after demilitarization. Some accessibility through a ventilation shaft to a small bunker room. 41°37′54″N 072°33′44″W
HA-48	Nike 1B, 2C/18H, 30A/12L-U, (7L-H)	Hartford	Cromwell, Connecticut	1956 – Nov 1968	Totally obliterated, nothing left. Turned into apartment complex. 41°36′22″N 072°41′29″W External videos: Video tour of HA-48 Control Site	Redeveloped into USAR Center, Transportation Company. Concrete launching pads visible but doors concreted over. 41°34′53″N 072°41′09″W
HA-67	Nike 1B, 2C/30A/12L-A	Hartford	Pinnacle Rock, Plainville, Connecticut	1956 – Mar 1961	Obliterated, Residential housing. 41°40′48″N 072°49′22″W	Redeveloped into Industrial Area. Nike launch site totally obliterated. 41°42′08″N 072°51′13″W
HA-85	Nike 1B, 2C/30A/12L-A	Hartford	Avon/Simsbury, Connecticut	1956–1963	Talcott Mountain Science center (buildings/radar pads). 41°48′39″N 072°47′55″W	Redeveloped into Tower View Condominiums; 41°49′39″N 072°49′48″W

=== Florida ===
Homestead–Miami Defense Area (HM): Despite the undetected arrival of a defecting Cuban B-26 Invader at Daytona Beach Airport in January 1959, the vulnerability of America's southern frontier was not apparent until the Cuban Missile Crisis. As part of America's posturing against the Soviet Union over the issue of missiles in Cuba, a rapid buildup of forces occurred in Florida. Part of this buildup included antiaircraft missile batteries. Command of the arriving missile units was assumed by the Headquarters and Headquarters Battery, 13th Artillery Group, formerly of Fort Stewart, Georgia, which arrived at Homestead AFB on October 30, 1962. By November 8, this command unit moved 4 miles north to a location at Princeton. Initially deploying MIM-23 Hawk mobile batteries, once it became evident that the missile deployment would be long-term, the batteries were repositioned and permanent structures were built which employed above-ground Nike-Hercules missiles. Hawk missile batteries in southern Florida, manned by 6-65 Artillery (1962–71); 6-65 ADA (1971–72); and 1st Battalion, 65th ADA (13 September 1972 – June 1979) continued on active duty until 1979, well beyond the 1975 demise of Army Air Defense Command (ARADCOM). Army Air Defense Command Post (AADCP) HM-01DC was established at Naval Air Station Richmond, FL 25°37′24″N 080°24′16″W in 1961 for Nike missile command-and-control functions. Site equipped with the AN/GSG-5(V) BIRDIE solid-state computer system. In 1965, upgraded to the AN/FSG-l Missile-Master Radar Direction Center. One height-finder radar was later removed and remaining set modified to an AN/FPS-116 c. 1977. HM-01DC was integrated with the USAF Air Defense Command/NORAD Semi Automatic Ground Environment (SAGE) air defense radar network as Site Z-210. The site was demolished by Hurricane Andrew on 24 August 1992 and subsequently closed.	Homestead–Miami Nike missile sites

Site Name	Missile Type	Defense Area	Site Location	Service Dates	Control Site condition/owner	Launch Site condition/owner	
HM-01; HM-03	Nike AK-3LH	Homestead–Miami	2 mi WNW Opa-locka/Carol City, Florida	1962 – late 1970s	Originally HM-01, Re-designated HM-03 Opa-locka Airport. Admin and IFC facility was located northwest of the intersection of NW 186 St and present-day NW 62 Ave. Razed shortly after closure in 1979 and transferred to US Navy for a Naval and Marine Corps Reserve Center. Now Navy Operational Support Center Miami and Marine Corps Reserve Center Miami. 25°56′22″N 080°17′56″W	HM-01 was Nike-Ajax. Upgraded to above-ground Nike-Hercules and re-designated HM-03. Actual missile area had 3 building to hold missiles, and rails to slide them outside. Exists in deteriorated condition east of and adjacent to the Miramar Armory of the Florida Army National Guard. 25°57′42″N 080°18′12″W	C-2-52 Stationed there.
HM-40	Nike AK-3LH	Homestead–Miami	1 mi S of Card Sound Road & County Road 905, Key Largo, Florida	6/1965 – 6/1979	Relocated from HM-66. Largely intact, however the forest has just about won the battle to reclaim its former areas. Radar towers are almost invisible; access to any of the buildings is nearly impassable. 25°16′35″N 080°18′11″W	Above-ground launch site. Transferred to the U.S. Navy in 1981. In 1982, the Navy transferred 4.2 acres in fee land to the U.S. Air Force, which operated a radio beacon annex from 1983 until at least 1996, first as an off-base installation of Homestead AFB, then as a detached installation. Dates of inactivation and disposal not known. Now mostly overgrown with vegetation. All buildings at the launch site have been torn down. Missile buildings have been completely removed, to include 3 foot thick concrete foundations. Missile maintenance/assembly building is only one still standing. 25°15′42″N 080°18′50″W	
HM-65; HM-66	Nike AK-3LH	Homestead–Miami	8 miles SW of Florida City, Florida	10/1962 – 6/1965	Originally HM-65, redesignated HM-66. Constructed during the Cuban Missile Crisis [October 1962]. In a two-week period, 24 hours a day, the Army Corps of Engineers literally built an island in the swamp by bringing in thousands of truck loads of earth fill to build an elevated land surface for the missiles and radars which would keep the equipment elevated above the Everglades water level. Site and unit moved to HM-40, with this site abandoned in June 1965. Buildings vacant, but given the remoteness of this facility appear to be in decent shape. No radar towers. Later re-used as an Aerojet facility but now abandoned. 25°21′43″N 080°33′42″W	HM-65 was Nike-Ajax. Upgraded to above-ground Nike-Hercules and re-designated HM-66. Above-ground launch facility with built-up pads, but no evidence of missile launch facilities remaining. 25°21′38″N 080°33′09″W	
HM-69	Nike AK-3LH	Homestead–Miami	12 miles WSW of Florida City, Florida	1962–1979	South Florida Natural Resources Center in Everglades National Park, under control of National Park Service. Now open to the public for tours by National Park Service staff. Exterior of the administration building and launch area can be viewed during the tour. Visitors are also allowed access to one of the sections barn's. Buildings in use, no radar towers. 25°23′17″N 080°40′59″W	Everglades National Park, National Park Service. Largely intact and listed on the National Register of Historic Places. 25°22′12″N 080°41′04″W	
HM-95	Nike AK-3LH	Homestead–Miami	12 miles west of Miami, Florida	1962–1979	DOD communications facility. Demolition of this facility began in 2015 and is now complete. No structures appear to remain. 25°44′15″N 080°28′54″W	Tamiami Trail (Now U.S. Immigration and Customs Enforcement Krome Ave Detention Facility); 25°45′01″N 080°29′22″W	
HM-85	None	Homestead–Miami	10 miles SW of Miami, Florida	1962–1979	Headquarters, Miami-Homestead Defense Area.		
HM-97	None	Homestead–Miami	Homestead AFB	1962–1979	Now under control of 482nd Fighter Wing (Air Force Reserve Command) and Detachment 1, 125th Fighter Wing (Florida Air National Guard)		
HM-99	None	Homestead–Miami	Homestead AFB	1962–1979			

=== Georgia ===
The Robins AFB Defense Area (R) and Turner AFB Defense Area (TU) were established when the USAF Strategic Air Command based B-52 Stratofortress intercontinental bombers at Robins and Turner Air Force Bases in 1959. Two Nike-Hercules batteries provided air defense for each base and were manned by Regular Army units. These above-ground sites remained active from November 1960 until March 1966.	Georgia Nike Missile Sites

Site Name	Missile Type	Defense Area	Site Location	Service Dates	Control Site condition/owner	Launch Site condition/owner
R-88	Nike 3AG/12H/12L-H	Robins	Byron, Georgia	Nov 1960 – Mar 1966	FDS. Abandoned, buildings appear derelict with lots of junk in the area. Locked and fenced. No radar towers showing in aerial imagery. 32°40′28″N 083°45′55″W	Above ground site with launchers protected by berms. FDS, now private ownership, fenced, restricted access. Appears to be light industrial estate. Many parked cars on site, probably employees. Berms around missile launch sites now around buildings erected in former missile sites. Many tractor trailers and new small business or manufacturing buildings on the site. 32°40′20″N 083°47′09″W
R-28	Nike 3AG/12H/12L-H	Robins	Jeffersonville, Georgia	Nov 1960 – Mar 1966	FDS. Site demolished and cleared. "Missile Base Road". Area has now become a "Academy Sports and Outdoors" distribution facility. 32°37′29″N 083°21′53″W	Former above-ground site with berms protecting launchers. FDS. Private property, with locked fence access. In aerial imagery, launch site appears to be abandoned and overgrown with trees and other vegetation. Difficult to tell with all wild vegetation status of launch site, no buildings appear to be standing, probably earthen berms exist under vegetation canopy. 32°37′42″N 083°21′05″W
TU-79	Nike 3AG/12H	Turner	Albany, Georgia (9 mi NW)	Nov 1960 – Mar 1966	Anchorage; drug & alcohol rehab center. Many military buildings in use and well maintained. Aerial imagery shows 3 radar towers still erect. 31°38′00″N 084°15′24″W	Redeveloped into single-family housing subdivision "Callaway Lakes". 31°37′50″N 084°16′42″W
TU-28	Nike 3AG/12H/12L-H	Turner	Willingsham/ Sylvester, Georgia (4 mi W)	Nov 1960 – Mar 1966	private retirement home. Buildings well maintained, appears to be 3 radar towers to the east of the buildings still standing 31°33′16″N 083°54′56″W	Above-ground site with launchers protected by berms. Private ownership, berms still in evidence in aerial imagery. Being used as an auto junkyard. Fenced with large number of hubcaps attached. 31°33′23″N 083°54′18″W

=== Hawaii ===
Oahu Defense Area (OA): Originally, the United States Army Pacific planned to build eight batteries at six sites around the island. Eventually this plan was scaled back to four. The antiaircraft command post was at Wahiawa and Headquarters facilities were located at Fort Ruger. Unlike many of the stateside sites that housed missiles in underground magazines, these sites were simply open-air launchers mounted on concrete pads surrounded by earthen berms. The sites were deactivated in 1970.	Oahu Nike Missile Sites

Site Name	Missile Type	Defense Area	Site Location	Service Dates	Control Site condition/owner	Launch Site condition/owner
OA-17	Nike 12H/12L-H	Oahu	Kauka/Kahuku, Hawaii	Jan 1961 – Mar 1970	On top of mountain ridge, under US Army control. Abandoned and overgrown. Buildings under vegetation, two large radio towers fallen on side visible. Probably facility is complete within the trees and wild underbrush. Access road to site overgrown with vegetation, inaccessible. 21°40′1″N 157°59′59″W	Above ground launching site with berms protecting launchers. Mostly overgrown still under US Army control on Kahuku Army Training Area, abandoned. 21°39′52″N 157°58′55″W
OA-32	Nike 24H/16L-H	Oahu	Bellows/ Waimanalo, Hawaii (dual site)	Mar 1961 – Mar 1970	On Bellows AFB, remains under US government control but abandoned. Four buildings still standing, no radar towers. 21°19′13″N 157°40′54″W	On Bellows AFS, Twin Nike-Hercules launch underground facilities thoroughly overgrown with vegetation, abandoned. 21°20′55″N 157°42′27″W
OA-63	Nike 24H/16L-H	Oahu	Ewa/ Makakilo, Hawaii (dual site)	Jan 1961 – Mar 1970	On top of mountain ridge, under US Army control. Two Integrated Fire Control (IFC) sites service the launch site, which contained twice the normal number of batteries. On 18 Sep 1968, IFC-2 was designated the Palehua AF Solar Observatory Research Site, activated, and assigned to Military Airlift Command with jurisdiction and operational control assigned to Air Weather Service. Part of this property (Control Site 5, from the Nike layout) had an even earlier use by the Army Air Forces. The Puu Manawahua Radar Station and Base Camp was a W.W.II Aircraft Warning Station, and continued to list in 1947 and 1948 USAF Installation Directories. Several Buildings standing also some radar towers. Access road to upper control site (IFC-1) inaccessible due to decades of vegetation growth taking back the road up to the top. Lower site (IFC-2) used as a state conservation baseyard. 21°23′10″N 158°06′19″W; 21°22′38″N 158°06′43″W	Double above-ground magazines, on top of mountain ridge, under US Army control, Both Nike launch facilities overgrown with vegetation, abandoned. Berms still quite visible under vegetation. concrete pad inside berms partially clear. Access road also overgrown with vegetation, inaccessible. 21°21′51″N 158°06′45″W
OA-84	Nike 12H/8L-H	Oahu	Waialua/ Dillingham, Hawaii	Jan 1961 – Mar 1970	At the summit of a hill above Dillingham Airfield, on state land. Several buildings standing; radio towers are recent additions. Currently used by the state of Hawaii. 21°32′45″N 158°11′41″W	Dillingham Airport, Above-ground Nike-Hercules launch facilities overgrown with vegetation, no buildings remain abandoned. 21°34′37″N 158°11′42″W

=== Illinois and Northwest Indiana ===
Chicago–Gary Defense Area (C): Site (C-98) Fort Sheridan hosted the headquarters of the Fifth Army Air Defense Command. Other regional command facilities were located at the Museum of Science and Industry, site (C-51) Orland Park, and site (C-80) Arlington Heights. Nike Hercules bases remained in operation at C49/50, C-72, and C-93 as well as at sites C-46 and C-47 in northern Indiana, until 1974. Army Air-Defense Command Post (AADCP) C-80DC established at Arlington Heights AI, IL in 1960 for Nike missile command-and-control functions. The site was initially an AN/FSG-l Missile-Master Radar Direction Center. It was later upgraded to the AN/TSQ-51 "Missile Mentor" solid-state computer system. C-80DC was integrated with the USAF Air Defense Command/NORAD Semi Automatic Ground Environment (SAGE) air defense radar network as Site RP-31 / Z-31. The Air Force ceased radar operations on 30 Sep 1969, and the AADCP was inactivated on 1 Sep 1974.	Chicago–Gary Defense Area

Site Name	Missile Type	Defense Area	Site Location	Service Dates	Control Site condition/owner	Launch Site condition/owner
C-03	Nike 3B, 2C/18H, 20A/20L-UA, (12L-H)	Chicago–Gary	Montrose Harbor / Belmont Harbor	Oct 1955 – June 1965	FDS. Razed and redeveloped into Montrose Harbor Park (part of the Lincoln Park extension) along the Chicago lakefront; on the former site of the control building is a beach restaurant called The Dock at Montrose Beach. 41°57′51″N 087°38′07″W	FDS. Totally obliterated. Now a grassy area south of Belmont Harbor along the Chicago lakefront in Lincoln Park. 41°56′18″N 087°38′03″W
C-32	Nike 3B/12H, 20A/12L-U	Chicago–Gary	Porter, Indiana	1957 – Apr 1974	Partially redeveloped; now the location of National Park Service Indiana Dunes National Lakeshore offices. Some of the original buildings remain intact, but were repurposed by the NPS. The site is approximately half a mile due west of former launch site. 41°37′50″N 087°05′16″W	Fenced and behind a locked gate, largely intact. Privately owned, abandoned and overgrown, surrounded on north and east by a new subdivision. Concrete pad still visible. Launch site buildings still have doors and window glass. Magazine launch doors removed; site appears to be filled in, with vegetation covering fill sites. One of the ready buildings on the south end of the site was sold independently of the main parcel, and is now a private residence 41°37′55″N 087°04′28″W
C-40	Nike 1B, 2C/30A/12L-A	Chicago–Gary	Burnham Park (Chicago)	1955 – Aug 1963	FDS. Totally obliterated by new construction. You can walk on the former IFC at Lake Shore and E 31st Street; now a nice little park with a playground and good view of downtown, Lake Michigan, Navy Pier and Chicago Harbor Lighthouse. 41°50′16″N 087°36′24″W	FDS. Totally obliterated; formerly a three-magazine (1B2C)/12-launcher facility with battery at Lake Shore Drive off the end of what's now I-55, south of the McCormick Place complex. Now part of the McCormick Place Bird Sanctuary. 41°50′54″N 087°36′44″W
C-41	Nike 1B, 2C/18H, 30A/12L-U	Chicago–Gary	Jackson Park (Chicago)	1955 – Jun 1971	On the south side in Jackson Park near the Museum of Science and Industry, at approximately 57th Street. The radar/control towers were built on Promontory Point. Redeveloped; now Promontory Point Park. 41.796134°N 87.575549°W	FDS. The administrative, housing, and launch complex area was located just west of South Lake Shore Drive, between the 59th St Harbor and Hayes Dr. The launch batteries and magazines were on the east edge of the Jackson Park Lagoons (facing east), about 3/4 mile away from the IFC radar site. The site has been totally obliterated; now part of the Bobolink Meadow and a golf driving range facility. 41.784142°N 87.580163°W
C-44	Nike 2B, 4C/60A/24L-AA	Chicago–Gary	Hegewisch / Wolf Lake, Illinois (dual site)	1955 – Mar 1963	FDS. Abandoned and overgrown site at the south end of lake/state recreation area. Appears to be largely intact underneath vegetation overgrowth; old access road entrance at Ave J & 133 Street largely obliterated. This area is within the SRA on the southern shore of the lake. 41°39′27″N 087°31′55″W	FDS. Abandoned site at the north end of the SRA/north shore of the lake, where S. Wolf lake Blvd. becomes S. State Line Rd. Roads in very poor condition, main access road overgrown by vegetation. Buildings have been razed but foundations remain; double-Nike-Ajax magazines badly cracked with wild vegetation overgrowing. 41°40′34″N 087°31′40″W
C-45	Nike 2B/20A/8L-A	Chicago–Gary	Gary Municipal Airport, Indiana	1957 – June 1960	Redeveloped area in northern tip of airport now has a general aviation hangar, parking lot and ramp area for aircraft parking. Site is across Industrial Highway from former launch site. 41°37′24″N 087°25′02″W	Razed but broken concrete pads still visible; former Civil Defense site. Also used as police firing range for the City of Gary, with former assembly building berm as the back stop. 41°37′28″N 087°24′43″W
C-46	Nike 1B, 1C/12H, 20A/12L-U, (8L-H)	Chicago–Gary	Munster, Indiana	1957 – Sep 1974	Completely redeveloped into industrial park on W side of Calumet Ave. N of 45th St. 41°32′41″N 087°30′29″W (Approximate)	Launch site on W side of Columbia Ave. south of 45th Ave. razed in 2008, obliterated; missile magazines filled in, concrete pads removed. Developed into a local hospital system campus. 41°31′40″N 087°30′53″W
C-47	Nike 1B, 1C/12H, 20A/12L-U, (8L-H)	Chicago–Gary	South Haven / Wheeler, Indiana	1956 – Mar 1974	Private ownership. Now Blast Camp paint-ball park. IFC is abandoned and very overgrown with vegetation. All buildings are still standing as well as several radar towers. Site is listed on the National Register of Historic Places. 41°31′25″N 087°10′37″W	Currently a paintball site under the name Blast Camp; site is in the middle of farm fields. Locked gate and fence; however, launch facility is abandoned and deteriorating – all buildings are standing, but they are in bad shape. Launch area concrete badly cracked, doors rusting, all of the magazines are filled to surface level with groundwater due to the high water table in the area. The Buildings and radar installations are fenced off as part of the paintball area, but the launch site is situated a quarter mile away, and on farm land. The launch site itself is not part of the paintball area. as of May 2025 all buildings remain standing, albeit most are heavily vandalized and roofless. Ready building had a fire lit inside the building that burned most of the roof off, Missile assembly building stands roofless, fallout shelter was used as a storage area, all other buildings in varying states of disrepair and disintegration, albeit the warhead assembly building remains remarkably intact save for one of the garage doors which appears to have been driven into with a truck. All silos fully flooded, close to being irreparable. Currently for sale by GSA. 41°31′59″N 087°10′01″W
C-48	Nike 2B/20A/8L-A	Chicago–Gary	Gary, Indiana	1957 – June 1960	FDS. Redeveloped but abandoned; site of a former automobile dealership on Grant Street, now empty. 41°33′26″N 087°21′16″W	FDS. Redeveloped into commercial/industrial site near NW corner of 35th Avenue and Grant Street. Some broken concrete remains of launch area. 41°33′26″N 087°22′17″W
C-49/50	Nike 1B, 2C/18H, 30A/11L-U	Chicago–Gary	Homewood, Illinois	1957 – Apr 1974	FDS. Leveled and cleared; redeveloped into Patriots Park along 187th Street; 41°33′02″N 087°38′51″W	FDS. Totally obliterated; replaced by the South Suburban Rehab Center at 19000 S Halsted St. 41°32′36.0″N 087°38′12.9″W
C-51	Nike 2B, 1C/30A/12L-A	Chicago–Gary	Alsip, Illinois / Palos Heights, Illinois	1956 – Mar 1963	FDS. Being cleared and leveled. 41°39′50″N 087°45′07″W	FDS. Being cleared and leveled. Some traces of building foundations but nothing of missile launchers or magazines. 41°40′17″N 087°46′23″W
C-54	Nike 1B, 2C/30A/12L-A	Chicago–Gary	Orland Park, Illinois	1955 – Dec 1961	FDS. Site razed in 2006; now a vacant lot with visible concrete debris piled up in several places. Located at the north end of Centennial Park along 153rd St. between Huntington Ct. and Hickory Dr. 41°36′40″N 087°52′08″W	FDS. Site redeveloped to Village of Orland Park Department of Public Works. Formally used as an ESDA facility for the Village. Administrative offices built over Missile magazines and sleeping quarters circa 1991. 41°36′21″N 087°51′29″W
C-61	Nike 2B/12H, 20A/8L-U	Chicago–Gary	Willowbrook, Illinois / Darien, Illinois	1955 – Nov 1968	FDS. Totally obliterated. Now a forest preserve. 41°43′20″N 087°57′50″W	Totally obliterated and redeveloped into the Parkhurst US Army Reserve Center. 41°43′41″N 087°58′38″W
C-70	Nike 1B, 2C/30A/12L-A	Chicago–Gary	Naperville, Illinois	1956 – Mar 1963	FDS. Redeveloped into an office park north of I-88. 41°48′36″N 088°08′50″W	FDS. Redeveloped into Nike Park Sports Complex on Diehl Road; 41°47′56″N 088°09′07″W
C-72	Nike 1B, 2C/18H, 30A/10L-U	Chicago–Gary	Addison, Illinois	1957 – Apr 1974	IFC Redeveloped into a public park called Nike Park, in the middle of a much larger industrial park. Base of radar tower and control building remain S.E. of baseball diamond. 41°55′24″N 088°01′46″W	Launch site re-developed into the headquarters building for the Addison Park District; the only remains are the existing fenceline as well as a van pad located to the north of the complex. 41°54′49″N 088°00′59″W
C-80/81	Nike 2B, 4C/60A/24L-AA	Chicago–Gary	Arlington Heights, Illinois (dual site) (Shared by C-80/C-81)	1950 – Aug 1974	IFC Redeveloped into 2 parks; no remains. 42°03′11″N 087°59′40″W	FDS. Redeveloped into part golf course, part U.S. Army Reserve center. The building that housed the Missile Master site is still standing and concrete paddocks that held radar tower are still visible. 42°03′49″N 087°59′52″W
C-84	Nike 1B, 2C/30A/12L-A	Chicago–Gary	Palatine, Illinois	1956–1963	FDS. Redeveloped into open greenspace with retention ponds. 42°09′17″N 088°02′49″W	FDS. Redeveloped into a corporate office complex. 42°09′26″N 088°03′30″W
C-92/94	Nike 1B, 2C/30A/12L-A	Chicago–Gary	Vernon Hills, Illinois	1955–1963	FDS. Redeveloped into Vernon Hills Athletic Complex. C-92: 42°13′14″N 087°57′11″WC-94: 42° 13′ 33.14″ N, 87° 56′ 53.81″ W	FDS. C-92 Redeveloped into Vernon Hills Athletic Complex. Excavated into a pond. 42°13′32″N 087°57′26″W; Second launch (C-94) area redeveloped into Vernon Hills Water Treatment Plant, but missile silos and above-ground bunker entrances still visible. 42°13′31.44″N 087°56′53.52″W
C-93	Nike 2B/12H, 20A/8L-U	Chicago–Gary	Northfield/Skokie Lagoons Glencoe, Illinois	1955 – Apr 1974	The radar and control facility was located on the west side of Forest Way Drive two blocks north of Tower Road. This was a very compact facility. Cleared land, no evidence except a few pipes emerging from below ground; apron off Forest Way still visible. The site today is on the North Branch Trail on a leveled-off hill. 42°07′13″N 087°46′09″W	The missile launchers were in a large bermed compound on the other side of the lagoons adjoining the Edens Expressway, about a quarter of a mile south of Dundee Road. Land cleared and being redeveloped into forested area. Launch area now fenced off and used as a dumping ground for dredging operations and is not open to the public, complex perimeter can be viewed from the bicycle trail. Minor remnants are still visible in the NE corner. Portion of the bike trail from Tower Road to the launch complex was original road used to access the base. 42°07′36″N 087°46′56″W
C-98	Nike 1B, 2C/30A/12L-A	Chicago–Gary	Fort Sheridan, Illinois	Jul 1954 – 1963	IFC existed right along the lakefront, but has now been developed and turned into an open prairie as part of the forest preserve. No remnants remain except some small broken chunks of concrete. 42°13′28″N 087°49′26″W	FDS. At southwest of Fort Sheridan National Cemetery. Concrete pad visible along with launch door (sealed). Site is fenced in, with a small break in it that allows access. As of May 2025 one silo remains completely flooded, though stairs/cover and launch doors are still present. 42°13′23″N 087°49′22″W

=== Kansas ===
Schilling AFB Defense Area (SC): Two sites began construction in April 1960, but never made operational. Construction halted in June 1960 and land sold off to private owners.	Schilling AFB Defense Area

Site Name	Missile Type	Defense Area	Site Location	Service Dates	Control Site condition/owner	Launch Site condition/owner
SC-01	Nike 3AG	Schilling AFB	Bennington, Kansas (5 mi SSE)	Apr 1960 – Jun 1960	Site was never operational, Private ownership, four long military buildings still exist with circular access road, usage unknown. 38°58′59″N 097°36′55″W	Above-ground Nike-Hercules site. Never operational. Private ownership, berm and assembly building exits. Other buildings erected and still appear to be in use. Site appears to have been leveled, graded and fenced. Outline of fence evident in aerial photography. 39°00′20″N 097°36′32″W
SC-50	Nike	Schilling AFB	Smolan, Kansas (5 mi SSW)	Apr 1960 – Jun 1960	Site was never operational. Private ownership, 4 military buildings still exist, usage unknown. 38°40′01″N 097°41′13″W	Site was never operational. Never completed. Site guard shack and owner' house is a reconstructed Crew quarters. The launcher Area has about 7 launch pads with 3 underground bunkers and 1 barn with rails, about 80% finished when construction halted. 38°38′55″N 097°43′06″W

=== Louisiana ===
Barksdale AFB Defense Area (BD): Two Nike Hercules sites, BD-10 at Bellevue and BD-50 northeast of Stonewall, were installed to provide protection to Shreveport and Barksdale AFB, which hosted Strategic Air Command bombers. U.S. Army Air Defense Command operated the sites with Regular Army units (possibly from 562nd Air Defense Artillery Regiment) from 1960 until 1966. Battalion Headquarters was located at the Louisiana Army Ammunition Plant located north of Doyline.	Barksdale AFB Defense Area

Site Name	Missile Type	Defense Area	Site Location	Service Dates	Control Site condition/owner	Launch Site condition/owner
BD-10	Nike 3AG/12H/12L-H	Barksdale	Bellevue, Louisiana	November 1960 – March 1966	Almost completely intact, Now Criminal Justice Institute, and Bossier Parish School Board. No radar towers. 32°40′19″N 093°31′18″W	Above-ground Nike-Hercules site, missiles protected by berms. Largely intact, Louisiana Wildlife and Fisheries Department, Bossier Parish SWAT field training site 32°40′28″N 093°30′35″W
BD-50	Nike 3AG/12H/12L-H	Barksdale	Stonewall, Louisiana (4 mi NE)	November 1960 – March 1966	Now LSU School of Medicine, almost all buildings were torn down with little evidence of IFC. Mostly vacant land in the middle of forested area. 32°18′12″N 093°47′04″W	FDS. Above-ground magazine protected by berms. Missile launch areas now abandoned and overgrown. Some buildings still standing, unknown condition. 32°17′37″N 093°47′16″W

=== Maine ===
Loring AFB Defense Area (L): Four Nike Ajax sites were placed around Loring Air Force Base for protection of the USAF Strategic Air Command B-52 Stratofortresses. Headquarters facilities were located at Loring Air Force Base. Manned by the Regular Army 3rd Missile Battalion, 61st Air Defense Artillery, these sites provided defense for Loring and the northeastern approaches to the United States. In 1960, sites L-13 and L-58 underwent conversion from Ajax to Hercules missiles. These sites remained operational until 1966. An Army Air-Defense Command Post (AADCP) was established at Caswell AFS, ME in 1957 for Nike missile command-and-control functions. It was designed for manual operations, using plexiglass plotting boards and telephonic inputs. The AADCP was later integrated with the USAF Air Defense Command/NORAD Semi Automatic Ground Environment (SAGE) air defense radar network as Site P-80 with FPS-10 (2); FPS-8/GPS-3; FPS-7C and FPS-6A radars. The AADCP inactivated in 1966.	Loring Air Force Base Defense Area

Site name	Missile type	Defense area	Site location	Service dates	Control site condition/owner	Launch site condition/owner
L-13	Nike 2C, 1B/18H, 30A/10L-U	Loring Air Force Base	Caswell, Maine	September 1957 – June 1966	L-13's housing area was taken over by the Air Force after the IFC was closed by the Army, and was redesignated as Loring Family Housing Annex #2. It was inactivated on 1 Oct 1980, declared excess on 15 Dec 1980, then reactivated on 12 May 1981 and remained in use until the closure of Loring Air Force Base in 1995. Now well-preserved in private ownership. Buildings standing, several radar towers. 47°02′07″N 067°49′06″W	FDS. Well-preserved in private ownership. Buildings standing, magazines visible with launch doors visible. Also the lawn is cut! 47°01′42″N 067°48′34″W
L-31	Nike 1B, 2C/30A/12L-A	Loring Air Force Base	Limestone, Maine	September 1957 – September 1958	L-31's housing area was taken over by the Air Force after the IFC was closed by the Army, and was redesignated as Loring Family Housing Annex #5. It was inactivated on 1 Oct 1980, declared excess on 15 Dec 1980, then reactivated on 12 May 1981 and remained in use until the closure of Loring Air Force Base in 1995. Now into multiple-family housing. Site obliterated, little evidence of IFC, overgrown. May be a radar platform in SE corner near "Nike Road". 46°55′37″N 067°47′47″W	FDS. In private ownership, buildings appear standing. Magazines exist, launch doors visible, probably welded shut, appears to be storage area. 46°55′03″N 067°47′31″W
L-58	Nike 1B, 2C/18H, 30A/12L-U	Loring Air Force Base	Caribou, Maine	September 1957 – June 1966	FDS. Partially intact. After the Nike-Hercules site was inactivated in 1966, used by the Air Force until Loring's inactivation in the early 1990s as part of SAC's GCCS (Global Command & Control System. L-58's housing area was taken over by the Air Force after the IFC was closed by the Army, and was redesignated as Loring Family Housing Annex #2. It was inactivated on 1 Oct 1980, declared excess on 15 Dec 1980, then reactivated on 12 May 1981 and remained in use until the closure of Loring Air Force Base in 1995. Now L-58C is used as a Long Range Radar (LRR) site by the FAA, designated "J-63" equipped with ARSR-4 Radar. Also used by the Air Force as part of the Joint Surveillance System (JSS) for NORAD. 46°53′10″N 067°58′13″W	FDS. Partially intact. Buildings standing, magazines visible with launch doors probably welded shut. 46°53′02″N 068°00′33″W
L-85	Nike 1B, 2C/30A/12L-A	Loring Air Force Base	Connor, Maine	September 1957 – June 1966	FDS. Well-preserved in private ownership. After the Nike site was closed in 1966, was taken over by the Air Force which used it as a communications facility and satellite tracking site. Closed in 1993 with the inactivation of Loring Air Force Base. Radar towers removed. L-85's housing area was taken over by the Air Force after the IFC was closed by the Army, and was redesignated as Loring Family Housing Annex #3. It was inactivated on 1 Oct 1980, declared excess on 15 Dec 1980, then reactivated on 12 May 1981 and remained in use until the closure of Loring Air Force Base in 1995. 47°00′05″N 068°00′11″W	FDS. Partially intact. Buildings removed, appears to be totally abandoned with no known use. Missile magazines exist however launchers appear to be concreted over. 47°00′30″N 068°01′06″W

=== Maryland/District of Columbia/Northern Virginia ===
Washington–Baltimore Defense Area (BA, W): Numerous Nike installations were built in Maryland to defend Baltimore and the nation's capital. Several also were built in the northern suburbs of Virginia. Baltimore Area Headquarters facilities were located at Towson, Fort Smallwood, Edgewood Arsenal, and Owings Mills. Headquarters facilities on the Maryland side of Washington's defenses were located at Fort Meade and Suitland. During the 1950s, Fort Meade also hosted the Headquarters, 2nd Region, Army Air Defense Command. All but W-44 remained active until 1974. Army Air-Defense Command Post (AADCP) W-13DC established at Fort Meade, MD in 1957 for Nike missile command-and-control functions. Site was both an AN/FSG-l Missile-Master and later AN/GSG-5(V) BIRDIE Radar Direction Center. W-13DC was the first Missile-Master DC to become operational. On 1 October 1961 W-13DC was integrated with USAF Air Defense Command/NORAD Semi Automatic Ground Environment (SAGE) air defense radar network as Site RP-54/Z-227. Air Force operations ended 1 October 1972. AADCP inactivated 1 September 1974 and dissolved as part of the 1988 Base Realignment and Closure Commission.	Washington–Baltimore Defense Area

Site name	Missile type	Defense area	Site location	Service dates	Control site condition/owner	Launch site condition/owner
BA-03	Nike 1B, 2C/18H, 30A/12L-UA, (8L-H)	Washington–Baltimore	Phoenix/ Sweet Air, Maryland	November 1955 – April 1974	FDS. Redeveloped into single-family housing. No evidence of IFC site. Manning was by A/602nd (11/55-8/56), A/54th (8/56-9/58), A/4/1st (9/58-12/62) and MDArNG D/1/70th (12/62-4/74). 39°30′31″N 076°34′46″W	FDS In private ownership, the barracks north of the launch area were demolished in 2010 but were previously used as the Jacksonville Senior Center. The Launch Area is still fenced in, although the access road to the magazine area leads to a storage yard and Commercial Driver Training course. Most structures are still present but have been repurposed as storage buildings. A new structure adjacent to "A" Section houses offices formerly used by the Baltimore County Fire Department Rescue Academy but now houses the Baltimore County Department of Public Works Safety Office and Training Academy. Magazines are intact, per Baltimore County personnel, are locked and dry, and are used for Confined Space Entry and Rescue Training. 39°30′59″N 076°34′11″W
BA-09	Nike 1B, 2C/30A/12L-A	Washington–Baltimore	Fork, Maryland	November 1955 – December 1962	After being inactivated by the Army, BA-09C was taken over by the Air Force sometime before 15 September 1967. It was used until 15 December 1975 for Civil Air Patrol use, being called Fork CAP Annex. Redeveloped into single-family housing. The Integrated Firing Control Site buildings & radars (formerly located at the end of Hutschenreuter Road in Fork were removed sometime in the early 1980s, and the property is now in private hands. Manning was by D/54th (11/55-9/58), D/4/1st (9/58-9/59) and MDArNG D/1/70th (9/59-12/62); 39°26′55″N 076°27′41″W	Launch site with three intact missile pits located at the end of Stocksdale Road in Kingsville, MD. Assembly buildings are still standing but now in private hands. The entrance road has many abandoned trailers and also much junk along the sides. The Magazine area is overgrown with vegetation and appears abandoned. Buildings were torn down. Magazine area looks like a storage/junkyard, concrete badly cracked. Launch doors are visible, probably welded shut more junk lying around as well. 39°26′49″N 076°26′52″W
BA-18	Nike 2B, 4C/18H, 30A/23L-UA (12L-H)	Washington–Baltimore	Edgewood Arsenal, Maryland	1954 – April 1974	Partially Intact, Maryland Army National Guard. Most buildings were razed, with no radar towers. Operating units were C/54th (/55-9/58) and C/4/1st (9/58-4/74); 39°24′55″N 076°16′22″W	Partially Intact, Maryland Army National Guard. Double magazine, launch doors appear to be concreted over, some buildings erected on firing pads. The buildings appear to be in use and in good condition. 39°25′27″N 076°15′58″W
BA-30/31	Nike 2B, 4C/18H, 30A/23L-UA, (12L-H)	Washington–Baltimore	Chestertown, Maryland (9 mi W)	1954 – April 1974	FDS. Buildings in use as "4-H Park and County Fairgrounds". Appears to be in good condition, no evidence of radar towers. Units assigned were D/36th (/54-9/58), D/1/562nd (9/58-12/62) and D/4/1st (12/62-4/74). 39°12′49″N 076°13′54″W	FDS. Barracks buildings in use, double magazine site. Facility fenced but appears to be open. Roads in fair condition, both magazines appear to be concreted over, large gravel pile on them, generally badly deteriorated. Remaining buildings in deteriorated condition. 39°12′14″N 076°14′12″W
BA-43	Nike 1B, 2C/30A/12L-A	Washington–Baltimore	Jacobsville, Maryland	1954 – Apr 1974	FDS. Redeveloped as Anne Arundel County Schools Maint & Operations center. Buildings in good shape, no evidence of radar towers. Manned by C/36th (/54-9/58), C/1/562nd (9/58-3/60) and MDArNG A/1/70th (3/60-12/62); 39°08′13″N 076°29′49″W	FDS. Double magazine site, now a storage yard. Buildings torn down, Launch doors visible, now welded shut. 39°07′43″N 076°29′48″W
BA-79	Nike 2B, 4C/24H, 20A/24L-UA, (16L-H)	Washington–Baltimore	Granite, Maryland	Dec 1954 – Mar 1974	FDS. Obliterated. Concrete slabs and some wooden curb stops remain, but all buildings have been removed. Some roads still exist as unconnected concrete. Formerly manned by the A/54th (12/54-8/56), A/602nd (8/56-9/58), A/4/5th (9/58-8/60), B/4/1st (8/60-12/62), MDArNG A/2/70th (12/62-3/63), HHB 1/70th (10/62-8/74) and B/1/70th (12/62-4/74); 39°20′45″N 076°51′23″W	FDS. Double magazine in good shape. Most buildings being used by the Maryland Wing, Civil Air Patrol with small area used by the Maryland State Police K-9 Division. Thoroughly fenced in. Launch area well maintained shows both Ajax and Hercules elevators, and per Maryland State Police are welded shut. Site leased in about 2014 and is now Wing Headquarters for the Maryland Wing, Civil Air Patrol. Site is actively being restored by volunteers of Maryland Wing, Civil Air Patrol. The Griggs House featured at the end of the movie, 'The Blair Witch Project' was located immediately behind the site, but has since been torn down. 39°21′19″N 076°51′02″W
BA-92	Nike 1B, 2C/30A	Washington–Baltimore	Cronhardt, Maryland	1955 – September 1963	Mostly sold off. Small part US Army Reserve center. The buildings are all new; the motor pool, up a rise slightly, has a couple of older structures, but the place otherwise has been cleaned off. Units assigned are the 2071st USAR School, 326th Maintenance Battalion and 214th MI Company. Little evidence of IFC site remains. Formerly manned by the B/54th (12/54-9/58), B/4/1st (9/58-9/59) and MDArNG D/2/70th (9/59-9/53); 39°27′24″N 076°43′44″W	FDS. Redeveloped into high-end single-family housing. A large planter covering the elevator of the "B" Section and some berms is all that remains of the launch site. 39°26′28″N 076°42′50″W
W-25	Nike 2B/12H, 20A/8L-U	Washington–Baltimore	Davidsonville, Maryland * Nike Missile Base W-25	Jun 1955 – Apr 1974	Private ownership, complete and buildings look in good shape. No towers. After the Army closed the Nike facility, It was gained as an off-base installation of Andrews AFB on 21 Feb 1975, under Headquarters Command. At some later time it transferred to Military Airlift Command, and on 1 Jun 1992 transferred to Air Mobility Command. Closed by 1997. Units assigned: B/36th 96/55-9/58), B/1/562nd (9/58-12/62), B/1/71st (12/62-/65), B/4/1st (/65-11/68) and MDArNG A/1/70th (11/68-4/74). 38°54′12″N 076°39′07″W	Former twin magazine site, intact, now Anne Arundel County Police Training Academy. Some construction on launching area, launch doors concreted over, but one of the two magazines had been converted into a gym. As of 2019, entire launch site covered by new police academy. Some administration buildings still stand. 38°54′09″N 076°38′28″W
W-26	Nike 1B, 2C/18H, 30A/12L-U, (8L-H)	Washington–Baltimore	Skidmore/ Bay Bridge, Maryland	1955 – Nov 1968	FDS. Redeveloped into Asbury Broadneck Methodist church. No evidence of IFC site. The units assigned were A/36th (/55-9/58), A/1/562nd (9/58-12/62) and MDArNG A/1/70th (12/62-11/68); 39°01′42″N 076°27′00″W	FDS. Partial remains. Launch site now the parking lot for the Children's Theatre of Annapolis and athletic fields. The generator building, guard house and warheading building are present and largely intact. The northern missile magazine is still exposed but has been fenced off and is modified into an underground machine shop. The elevator is present but the hydraulics have been removed. This magazine is currently abandoned and is flooded to a depth of several inches. The other magazines are buried beneath a modern parking lot and have been filled with soil. 39°01′39″N 076°25′42″W
W-35	Nike 2B/20A/8L-A	Washington–Baltimore	Croom/ Marlboro, Maryland	1955 – Mar 1963	FDS. Redeveloped into Croom Vocational High School. Some older buildings deteriorated. No evidence of radar towers. The units were HHB and B/75th (11/54-9/58), HHB and B/3/562nd (9/58-6/60) and MDArNG B/3/70th (6/60-3/63); 38°46′29″N 076°44′41″W	FDS Redeveloped into Croom Vocational High School, the launch site is identified as the auto, building trades, and grounds keeping school. Ajax launch covers visible, some obscured by buildings, two launch doors for Hercules, probably welded shut. 38°46′11″N 076°43′51″W
W-36	Nike 1B, 2C/30A/12L-A	Washington–Baltimore	Brandywine/ Naylor Maryland	1957 – Dec 1961	The housing area in Brandywine, Maryland, supported Washington Nike Site W-36 from approximately 1957 – 1961. It was transferred from the Army to the Air Force (Headquarters Command) on 10 Jun 1963. At that time it was redesignated; and Jurisdiction, Control, and Accountability assigned to Andrews AFB. At some later time it transferred to Military Airlift Command, and on 1 Jun 1992 transferred to Air Mobility Command. Current status is unknown. The IFC is now abandoned. Most buildings in deteriorated state, large amount of vegetation overgrowth. Radar towers appear overgrown also. Manned by D/75th (11/54-9/58) and D/3/562nd (9/58-12/61). 38°42′38″N 076°46′14″W	FDS. Private owners, buildings in good shape, appears to be single-family homes built on site. Magazine area is in good shape, launch doors visible, probably welded shut. Looks like some vehicles are parked on concrete pads. 38°42′25″N 076°45′38″W
W-44	Nike 2B/12H, 20A/8L-UA	Washington–Baltimore	Mattawoman/ Waldorf, Maryland	1955 – Jun 1971	Maryland Indian Heritage Society, Melwood Horticultural Training Center. Buildings mostly razed, part of facility remains in SW corner. Operations were by C/75th (11/54-9/58), C/3/562nd (9/58-12/61), A/1/71st (12/61-3/63), MDArNG A/3/70th (12/61-3/63) and MDArNG C/1/70th (3/63-6/71). 38°39′09″N 076°52′07″W	Maryland Indian Heritage Society. Launch site looks abandoned, buildings in deteriorated condition. Ajax and Hercules launch doors visible, probably welded shut. 38°39′17″N 076°51′20″W
W-45	Nike 2B/20A/8L-A	Washington–Baltimore	Accokeek, Maryland	1955 – Dec 1961	FDS. IFC site was largely torn down. A few buildings, mostly forested. W-45 was manned by the A/75th (11/54-9/58), A/3/562nd (9/58-6/60) and MDArNG B/3/70th (6/60-12/61) ADA. 38°38′33″N 077°00′45″W	FDS. Launch site relatively intact, magazines visible however appears launch doors concreted over. Perimeter fencing is intact and sturdy. Site was formerly the Naval Research Lab-Field Site lower Waldorf; the small observatory on the barracks associated with this usage has been removed. Signage indicates that it is being redeveloped as residential housing. 38°38′37″N 077°00′55″W
W-64	Nike 2B, 2C/24H, 60A/24L-UA, (16L-H)	Washington–Baltimore	Lorton, Virginia (dual site)	1954 – Sep 1958	This site was co-located with the now closed Lorton Reformatory. Now the site of South County Middle School. Units assigned were C/71st (7/54-9/58), C/1/71st (9/58-8/63), VAArNG A/1/280th (9/59-3/63) and VAArNG A/4/111th (8/63-4/74). 38°43′15″N 077°14′41″W	Double launch magazine now District of Columbia minimum security prison. All six magazines are concreted over. Barracks buildings remain intact and little altered. 38°42′32″N 077°15′10″W
W-74	Nike 2B/20A/8L-A	Washington–Baltimore	Fairfax/Pohick, Virginia	1954 – Mar 1963	Fairfax County ownership, maintenance yard. Only a couple of buildings standing. Two towers are still standing, covered with corrugated sheet steel. Manned by D/71st (7/54-9/58), D/1/71st (9/58-9/59) and VAArNG B/1/280th (9/59-3/63); 38°48′56″N 077°20′35″W	Launch area obliterated, owned by Fairfax County and repurposed as Popes Head Park; a marker close the site, Virginia Historic marker E98 states: "During the Cold War a ring of Nike anti-aircraft missile sites defended the nation's capital, reminiscent of the perimeter of forts that protected it during the Civil War. Just east of here was located the launch control equipment for one of the three Nike complexes in Fairfax County. To the west stood the missiles, poised on above-ground launchers. The U.S. Army (1954–1959) and the Army National Guard (1959–1963) operated this battery. Built to oppose Soviet air attack, this complex and those in Great Falls and Lorton were three of thirteen Nike sites that surrounded Washington and Baltimore." Both magazines were unroofed and backfilled with earth. Perimeter fencing intact. Some ruins are visible along the west boundary, including the crushed fuelling stand and parts of the acid storage sheds. 38°48′50″N 077°21′21″W
W-83	Nike 1B, 2C/30A/12L-A	Washington–Baltimore	Herndon/ Dranesville, Virginia	1954 – November 1962	Redeveloped into "Observatory Park". IFC was operated by B/71st (7/54-9/58) and B/1/71st (9/58-11/62); 38°59′43″N 077°18′45″W	Part of site was used for construction of Forestville Elementary School. The rest and part of surrounding area was redeveloped into "Great Falls Nike Missile Park". 38°59′30″N 077°19′44″W
W-92	Nike 1B, 2C/18H, 30A/12L-U	Washington–Baltimore	Rockville, Maryland	1954 – April 1974	FDS. Redeveloped into US Consumer Products Safety Commission Engineering Laboratory, awaiting conversion into Pleasant View Park by the City of Gaithersburg. IFC units assigned were A-71st (/54-9/55), D/602nd (9/55-9/58), D/4/5th (9/58-8/60), D/1/71st (8/60-/65) and A/4/1st (/65-4/74); 39°06′23″N 077°13′23″W	Formerly under US government control, National Institute of Standards and Technology. Remains in secure area, used as a storage area by NIST, but awaiting rezoning for residential development. Magazines were electrified under NIST control and used for covered underground storage. The elevator still works in one magazine and is used at times to move the larger equipment. 39°07′01″N 077°13′11″W
W-93	Nike 1B, 2C/30A/12L-A	Washington–Baltimore	Derwood, Maryland	1955 – August 1960	FDS. Redeveloped into American Foundation for Autistic Children. IFC site operated by B/602nd (9/55-9/58) and B/4/5th (9/58-8/60); 39°12′37″N 077°05′24″W	Still under US government control, Naval Surface Warfare Center. Magazine used as Olney Support Center, within a fenced area, manned and guarded 24/7. The assembly building still stands and is used as a warehouse. The generator building is still in use. 39°12′33″N 077°06′20″W
W-94	Nike 1B, 2C/30A/12L-A	Washington–Baltimore	Gaithersburg, Maryland	1955 – March 1963	FDS. Obliterated, residential area. Now Nike Missile Park run by MNCPPC. 39°09′37.8″N 077°10′33.4″W	Part of Army Reserve Center, in back of facility. Used as a storage yard/junkyard. Former Ajax installation with 12 launchers. Magazines were sealed during environmental hazards assessment in the 1990s but were then opened and badly vandalized. They have since been demolished to build a training facility. The land at 770 Muddy Branch Road (Excess Land Sale Only) is one of fourteen federal properties listed for disposal by the Public Buildings Reform Board in their 2019 recommendations. The battery was manned by C/602nd (9/55-9/58), C/4/5th (9/58-6/60) and MDArNG C/2/70th (6/60-3/63); 39°10′51.1″N 077°10′35.5″W

=== Massachusetts ===
Boston Defense Area (B or BO): Boston's Nike Batteries were manned initially by Regular Army troops. In 1959, National Guard units assumed control of B-03, B-15, B-55, and B-63. In 1964, the Army turned sites B-36 and B-73 over to the Guard. After the phase-out of the Nike Ajax system, sites B-05, B-36, and B-73 remained supplied with Hercules missiles. Army Air-Defense Command Post (AADCP) B-21DC established at Fort Heath, MA in 1960 for Nike missile command-and-control functions. The site was an AN/FSG-l Missile-Master Radar Direction Center. In early 1965 the AN/TSQ-51 "Missile Mentor" solid-state computer system was installed. B-21DC was integrated with the USAF Air Defense Command/NORAD Semi Automatic Ground Environment (SAGE) air defense radar network as Site MM-1. The Boston Defense Area merged with Hartford & Providence Defense Areas in 1962, becoming the New England Defense Area. Air Force operations at the site ended in 1962, and Nike operations were inactivated in 1974.	Boston Defense Area

Site Name	Missile Type	Defense Area	Site Location	Service Dates	Control Site condition/owner	Launch Site condition/owner
B-03	Nike 1B, 2C/30A/12L-A	Boston	Reading, Massachusetts	Jun 1955 – Mar 1963	FDS. Redeveloped into multi-family housing. 42°30′26″N 071°05′53″W	FDS. Redeveloped into a skating rink. 42°32′28″N 071°05′05″W
B-05	Nike 1B, 2C/18H, 30A/12L-UA, (7L-H)	Boston	Danvers, Massachusetts	Nov 1956 – Apr 1974	Remains an Army Reserve facility. Former buildings still in use, mostly cleared no sign of any radar towers. 42°35′18″N 070°56′43″W	FDS. Overgrown and abandoned. Mostly intact. 42°36′28″N 070°56′57″W
B-15	Nike 1B, 2C/30A/12L-A	Boston	Beverly, Massachusetts	Feb 1957 – Mar 1963	FDS. Abandoned. Appears to be a large water tower built on site. 42°34′47″N 070°52′34″W	FDS. FEMA team headquarters, and missile site still accessible. 42°35′21″N 070°54′41″W
B-17	Nike 1B, 2C/30A/12L-A	Boston	Nahant, Massachusetts	Feb 1957 – Mar 1963	Located at Bailey's Hill Park. Appears to be the base of a radar tower remaining, no buildings. 42°25′09″N 070°55′46″W	Now Northeastern University Marine Science Center. Launchers obliterated. 42°25′05″N 070°54′14″W
B-36	Nike 2B/12H, 20A/8L-U	Boston	Fort Duvall/ Hull, Massachusetts	Jan 1956 – Apr 1974	Formerly located on Hog Island, formerly Ft. Duvall. Now obliterated, Private ownership, housing. 42°18′01″N 070°53′46″W	Formerly located on Hog Island, formerly Ft. Duvall. Now obliterated, Park, ownership by Commonwealth of Massachusetts. 42°18′06″N 070°53′50″W
B-37	Nike 2B/20A	Boston	Webb Memorial State Park/ Weymouth, Massachusetts	Jan 1956 – Dec 1961	FDS. Now Nickerson Beach/Chappel Rock Park. Obliterated, overgrown. Perhaps some structures in the overgrowth. 42°18′12″N 071°00′41″W	FDS. Located on Webb State Park/South Shore Association for Retarded Citizens (Mess Hall, EM Barracks and Missile Test & Assembly Building remain, pits buried but vents & ducts are visible). 42°19′01″N 070°58′03″W
B-38	Nike 1B, 2C/30A/12L-A	Boston	Cohasset/ Hingham, Massachusetts	Nov 1956 – Dec 1961	FDS. Now "Turkey Hill Park". One small IFC building remains. 42°14′23″N 070°51′08″W	FDS. Now County highway maintenance storage facility. 42°14′14″N 070°49′50″W
B-55	Nike 1B, 2C/30A/12L-A	Boston	Blue Hills/ Randolph, Massachusetts	Jun 1955 – Mar 1963	FDS. Largely obliterated, now Massachusetts Audubon education center. 42°13′20″N 071°03′42″W	FDS. Former triple Ajax battery. Very deteriorated state. 42°12′00″N 071°04′21″W
B-63	Nike 1B, 2C/30A/12L-A	Boston	Needham, Massachusetts	Jun 1955 – Mar 1963	FDS. Now The Charles River Center. 42°17′26″N 071°15′17″W	FDS. A small not-for-profit community farm provides outdoor education on part of the site. 42°16′20″N 071°16′22″W
B-73	Nike 2B/12H, 20A/8L-U	Boston	South Lincoln/Wayland, Massachusetts	Jan 1956 – Apr 1974	FDS. Now Massachusetts Audubon Society, Drumlin Farm. 42°24′29″N 071°19′56″W	FDS. Obliterated, no evidence of launch site. Residential housing built in place. 42°24′35″N 071°21′37″W
B-84	Nike 2B/20A/8L-A	Boston	Burlington, Massachusetts	Jan 1956 – Aug 1963	FDS. Owned by Burlington Recreation Commission. Buildings are current home to "Burlington Players" community theatre company. Evidence of IFC structures on hill behind buildings. 42°29′24.38″N 071°10′39.49″W	FDS. A parking lot for Northeastern University Suburban Campus (Innovation Campus at Burlington). 42°28′41″N 071°11′30″W
B-85	Nike 1B, 2C/30A/12L-A	Boston	Bedford, Massachusetts	Nov 1956 – Dec 1961	After being closed in 1961, the lease for this former Nike IFC site was transferred to the Air Force in 1965. Used as the Bedford Electronics Research Annex. The Air Force used the property until 1976. Today, partially Intact, Private ownership. Redeveloped into single-family housing. 42°29′29″N 071°18′13″W	Missile pads partially Intact, Harvard University. 42°30′28″N 071°17′41″W

=== Michigan ===
Detroit Defense Area (D): Built during the mid-1950. Headquarters facilities were posted at Selfridge AFB as well as the Detroit Artillery Armory. Between 1958 and 1961, the Army converted sites (D-06, D-16, D- 26, D-58, D-61, and D-87) from Nike Ajax to Nike Hercules. 3rd Battalion, 55th Artillery (Air Defense) helped man these sites. The Michigan National Guard assumed manning responsibilities for many of the sites in the 1960s. Sites D-06, D-58, and D-87 Hercules batteries remained active until 1974. Army Air-Defense Command Post (AADCP) D-15DC established at Selfridge AFB, MI in 1960 for Nike missile command-and-control functions. The site was initially an AN/FSG-l Missile-Master Radar Direction Center. It was later upgraded to the AN/TSQ-51 "Missile Mentor" solid-state computer system. D-15DC was integrated with the USAF Air Defense Command/NORAD Semi Automatic Ground Environment (SAGE) air defense radar network as Site P-20 / Z-20 The Air Force ceased radar operations when the Army no longer needed radar support and the AADCP was inactivated 1 Sep 1974.	Detroit Defense Area

Site Name	Missile Type	Defense Area	Site Location	Service Dates	Control Site condition/owner	Launch Site condition/owner
D-06	Nike 2B/12H, 20A/8L-U	Detroit	Utica, Michigan	1955 – Apr 1974	FDS. Abandoned, now known as the Rochester-Utica State Recreation Area and the Shadbush Environmental Educational Center. 42°38′37″N 083°03′33″W	FDS. Owned by the Utica School District. New building and landscaping to the west of the former missile pads. Pads have been removed, with just disturbed earth and a cleared area where they were. 42°39′01″N 083°04′06″W
D-14	Nike 2B/20A/8L-A	Detroit	Selfridge AFB, Michigan (Shared with D-16)	1955 – Feb 1963	After inactivation, the property reverted to Selfridge AFB. Partially Intact, Army Engineering Support Buildings; 42°35′55″N 082°49′04″W	After inactivation, the property reverted to Selfridge AFB. Now obliterated, although largely intact. Command, maintenance, and fueling buildings now serve as the U.S. Border Patrol's Detroit Sector Headquarters; 42°35′45″N 082°50′55″W
D-16	Nike 2B/12H, 20A/8L-U	Detroit	Selfridge AFB, Michigan (Shared with D-14)	1955 – Jun 1971	After inactivation, the property reverted to Selfridge AFB. Partially Intact, Army Engineering Support Buildings; 42°35′55″N 082°49′04″W	After inactivation, the property reverted to Selfridge AFB. Now obliterated, although largely intact. Command, maintenance, and fueling buildings now serve as the U.S. Border Patrol's Detroit Sector Headquarters. 42°35′57″N 082°49′50″W
D-17	Nike 1B, 2C/30A/12L-A	Detroit	Algonac/ Marine City, Michigan	1957 – Feb 1963	Private ownership, redeveloped into single-family housing. The perimeter fence appears to remain. 42°41′51″N 082°34′30″W	Private ownership. Appears to be a storage area for tractor-trailers. Magazines appear intact. 42°41′41″N 082°33′43″W
D-23	Nike 2B/20A/8L-A	Detroit	Detroit City Airport, Michigan (Shared double Launch facility with D-26, separate IFCs)	1955 – Dec 1960	Obliterated, City of Detroit. Land incorporated within Alfred Brush Ford Park (also known as Ford Brush Park) at the foot of Lenox Ave. Nothing remains of the IFC except the MTR and TTR towers. 42°21′24″N 082°56′28″W	Obliterated, City of Detroit. Located on Belle Isle, south of Blue Heron Lagoon, East side of Lakeside Drive; 42°20′43″N 082°57′20″W
D-26	Nike 2B, 2C/12H, 20A/12L-UA, (8L-H)	Detroit	Belle Isle, Michigan (Shared double Launch facility with D-23, separate IFCs)	1955 – Nov 1968	Obliterated, City of Detroit. Now a part of Maheras-Gentry Park; 42°21′22″N 082°56′58″W	Obliterated, City of Detroit. Located on Belle Isle, south of Blue Heron Lagoon, East side of Lakeside Drive; 42°20′43″N 082°57′20″W
D-51	Nike 1B, 2C/20A/8L-A	Detroit	Naval Air Station Grosse Ile (Now Grosse Ile Airport), Michigan	1955 – Feb 1963	FDS. Abandoned lot now filled with junk belongs to the Township of Grosse Ile and is leased to a landscaping company 42°06′28″N 083°09′18″W	FDS. Has been completely demolished and made into a nature conservatory. A semi-circular embankment protecting the fueling area remains. This area is currently being run by the U.S. Fish and Wildlife Service. 42°05′52″N 083°09′15″W
D-54	Nike 4B, 2C/30A/24L-AA	Detroit	Riverview/ Wyandotte, Michigan (dual site)	1955 – Feb 1963	FDS. Redeveloped into Immanuel Lutheran Church and a multi-story light office building 42°10′59″N 083°11′47″W	FDS. The launcher area is now a public park with a Nike-Hercules missile and a plaque dedicating the site. The pits are still there, under the park, behind the fire station. There is one original building left near the launch site, which has been refurbished and turned into a hall to host Cub Scout events and such. 42°10′28″N 083°11′49″W
D-57/58	Nike Carlton: 3B/20A/12L-A Newport: 3B/18H, 30A/12L-UA	Detroit	Carleton/ Newport, Michigan (shared double launch, separate control sites)	1955 – Apr 1974	FDS Derelict, but partially intact. The Radar towers, Generator bldg., Van pads, and connecting building foundation are all there. D-58 control site is currently being auctioned to general public by General Services Administration. 42°00′06″N 083°22′04″W	FDS Redeveloped into single-family housing. D-57 site demolished, redeveloped into Ford Motor Co. automotive parts distribution center in 2021. 42°00′20″N 083°20′35″W
D-61	Nike 1B, 2C/18H, 30A/12L-UA	Detroit	Romulus/ Dearborn, Michigan	1957 – Jun 1971	Northwest side of what is now Detroit Metropolitan Wayne County Airport. 42°13′42″N 083°21′34″W	East side of what is now Detroit Metropolitan Wayne County Airport. 42°12′08″N 083°21′06″W
D-69	Nike 2B/20A/8L-A	Detroit	River Rouge Park, Michigan	1956 – Feb 1963	Partially Intact, City of Detroit, River Rouge Park. 42°21′29″N 083°15′12″W	Obliterated, City of Detroit. Redeveloped into Howard Cassidy Park. 42°20′27″N 083°14′59″W
D-86	Nike 1B, 2C/30A/12L-A	Detroit	Franklin/ Bingham, Michigan	1957 – Feb 1963	Site is now the location of a couple of office buildings. 42°29′12″N 083°17′43″W	Partially intact. It resides within an Army Reserve facility. 42°29′30″N 083°18′29″W
D-87	Nike 1B, 2C/18H, 30A/12L-U, (10L-H)	Detroit	Commerce/ Union Lake, Michigan	1955 – Apr 1974	FDS. Almost intact – buildings still exist but are vandalized and a section has major fire damage. It is also owned by the Michigan DNR. It was being used as a Day Camp for children, but is now abandoned. 42°35′48″N 083°28′15″W	FDS. Demolished, open lot owned by Michigan DNR. 42°35′57″N 083°28′00″W
D-97	Nike 1B, 2C/30A/12L-A	Detroit	Auburn Hills, Michigan	1955 – Feb 1963	Obliterated, Oakland Community College; 42°38′41″N 083°13′24″W	Obliterated by 1997. Oakland Community College. Was used as a storage site for construction supplies by the university's building contractors at first. 42°38′35″N 083°14′01″W

=== Minnesota ===
Minneapolis–St.Paul Defense Area (MS): In operation from 1959 until 1971, the following four Nike Hercules batteries guarded the approaches to the Twin Cities. The Birdie command and control facility, located at Snelling Air Force Station, provided target designation information to the batteries. Headquarters facilities were also located at Snelling.	Minneapolis–St.Paul Defense Area

Site Name	Missile Type	Defense Area	Site Location	Service Dates	Control Site condition/owner	Launch Site condition/owner
MS-20	Nike 3D/18H/12L-U	Minneapolis–Saint Paul	Roberts, Wisconsin	Oct 1959 – Jun 1971	Bureau of Outdoor Recreation to Saint Croix County; 45°01′18″N 092°33′41″W	Launch site in good condition. Fenced and gated. Also used as a self-storage site. 45°01′47″N 092°33′13″W
MS-40	Nike 3D/18H/12L-U	Minneapolis–Saint Paul	Castle Rock, Minnesota	Oct 1959 – Jun 1971	USAR Center. 44°38′36″N 093°09′50″W	Is on County Road 80S in Castle Rock, Minnesota. Used to be well preserved for its years of age and disuse, but the underground batteries were demolished and filled in 2001. It was formerly under private ownership, used as an Airsoft gaming facility, most notably by the Minnesota Airsoft Association. The owner had planned to use it as a Law Enforcement Training facility, however, after rejecting a bid submitted by a construction company owned by the Planning Commission Chairman, the owners requests for permits were rejected. The site is currently for sale. It is home to a MNDOT radio tower. It is also a safe haven for deer chased by hunters in the area, as it is completely fenced in. 44°34′17″N 093°04′37″W
MS-70	Nike 3D/18H/12L-U	Minneapolis–Saint Paul	Saint Bonifacius, Minnesota	Oct 1959 – Jun 1971	Private ownership. Partially intact. 44°56′07″N 093°45′24″W	FDS Private ownership in good condition. 44°57′05″N 093°46′52″W
MS-90	Nike 3D/18H/12L-U	Minneapolis–Saint Paul	Bethel/ Isanti, Minnesota	1959 – Jun 1971	Isanti County Sheriff's Department. 45°26′22″N 093°20′16″W	Private ownership, largely intact. 45°26′52″N 093°20′46″W

=== Missouri ===
Kansas City Defense Area (KC): Two Nike Hercules batteries, dubbed Lawson and Lone Jack, guarded the eastern approaches to Kansas City. The Corps of Engineers Kansas City District commenced work on these sites in late spring 1958. Army Air-Defense Command Post (AADCP) KC-65DC was established at Olathe AFS, KS in 1959 for Nike missile command-and-control functions. The site was equipped with the AN/GSG-5(V) BIRDIE solid-state computer system. KC-65DC was integrated with the USAF Air Defense Command/NORAD Semi Automatic Ground Environment (SAGE) air defense radar network as Site P-72 / Z-72. Air Force operations ended 8 Sep 1968; the AADCP inactivated in 1969 St. Louis Defense Area (SL): The Chicago District of the Corps of Engineers oversaw the design and construction. Army Air-Defense Command Post (AADCP) SL-47DC was established at Belleville AFS, IL in 1959 for Nike missile command-and-control functions. The site was equipped with the AN/GSG-5(V) BIRDIE solid-state computer system. SL-47DC was integrated with the USAF Air Defense Command/NORAD Semi Automatic Ground Environment (SAGE) air defense radar network as Site P-70 / Z-70. The site was closed on 18 June 1968.	Missouri Nike Missile Sites

Site Name	Missile Type	Defense Area	Site Location	Service Dates	Control Site condition/owner	Launch Site condition/owner
KC-10	Nike 3D/18H/12L-U	Kansas City	Lawson, Missouri	Nov 1959 – Feb 1964	Private Ownership. Three well preserved buildings are in good shape, and several others deteriorated; sidewalks between buildings exist as also the base of the flagpole. Several radar towers standing, several buildings in radar area deteriorating, and some loose concrete on site. Area fenced and gated. 39°24′55″N 094°10′24″W	Private ownership. Buildings deteriorated but intact. Concreted areas cracked and in poor condition. Magazine area appears to be an auto junkyard, although intact, appears to be a large garage, auto dismantling building erected over the magazine. 39°26′06″N 094°10′22″W
KC-30	Nike 3D/18H/12L-U	Kansas City	Pleasant Hill, Missouri	Nov 1959 – Feb 1969	Private ownership, development company. Buildings torn down, foundations remain. Roads exist with severe cracking in poor shape. 38°49′52″N 094°09′41″W	Intact appears to be in private hands. Buildings were torn down, some new structures erected, and a bunch of old boats and trucks stored on site; may be a junkyard. Concrete around magazines severely cracked both Ajax and Hercules doors. Bay doors and elevators still work and are still in use by owners. 38°48′59″N 094°09′22″W
KC-60	Nike 3D/18H/12L-U	Kansas City	Gardner, Kansas (2 mi S)	Nov 1959 – Feb 1969	Redeveloped into Gardner Unified School offices. The site totally redeveloped with new buildings. No evidence of IFC remains.... 38°46′34″N 094°55′42″W	FDS. Located behind single-family home subdivision 20260 South Gardner Road. The old missile site is clearly visible with satellite imagery, including the three silos. 38°45′38″N 094°56′04″W
KC-80	Nike 3D/18H/12L-U	Kansas City	Fort Leavenworth, Kansas	Nov 1959 – Feb 1969	Redeveloped. Single-family home. Large wooded area around the home appears to be totally redeveloped with no evidence of IFC, although may be parts of the facility in the woods to the southwest of the house. 39°20′29″N 094°57′04″W	Mix of new and old buildings. Currently used as the Rod & Gun Club and the 35th Infantry Division (Mech) motor pool/maintenance facility. The vehicle park is on top of the three magazines. Large number of cars, boats, large RVs. Doors probably welded shut. 39°21′42″N 094°56′24″W
SL-10	Nike 3D/18H/12L-U	Saint Louis	Marine, Illinois	May 1960 – Dec 1968	Access road to highway 4 only remnants of IFC site. Contaminated soil remediated on site. The village has constructed wastewater treatment lagoons on 1/3 of the site. The rest of the site is used by farmers. Fenced. 38°47′44″N 089°47′58″W	Private ownership, Old Army building still standing most in good condition, along with the roads. The concrete area around magazines, in good shape, appears to be used as a storage yard. 38°49′56″N 089°47′25″W
SL-40	Nike 3D/18H/12L-U	Saint Louis	Hecker, Illinois	May 1960 – Dec 1968	Private Ownership – Purchased 7-12-14 by Ron Mertens of Smithton IL. Beck VoTech School. Buildings appear in excellent condition. 38°17′23″N 089°56′51″W	FDS. Abandoned. Most buildings remain, Concrete in magazine area cracked. Launchers appear to be concreted over. Fenced. 38°16′11″N 089°57′00″W
SL-60	Nike 3D/18H/12L-U	Saint Louis	Pacific, Missouri (5 mi S)	1960 – Dec 1968	Private ownership, now MPL Industries. On "Nike Base Road". Mostly redeveloped, many buildings remain in good shape, sidewalks still connecting buildings. Troop barracks are used for storage for Nike Elementary School in the Meramec Valley R-3 school district. Air strip is now part of Evergreen Lakes subdivision. 38°24′30″N 090°45′16″W	Road back to launch site from IFC in good shape. Fenced and gated. Site is now used as a bus parking lot for Meramec Valley R-3 school district. Some buildings exist, launcher area intact. 38°24′13″N 090°45′18″W
SL-90	Nike 3D/18H/12L-U	Saint Louis	Alton/ Pere Marquette May, Illinois	1960 – Dec 1968	Intact, Abandoned, Pere Marquette State Park. Overgrown, most buildings underneath veneration canopy. Still behind locked gate and fenced. 38°58′55″N 090°30′32″W	Abandoned, Pere Marquette State Park, kits if debris on the launchers, site used as a storage yard. 38°59′43″N 090°30′36″W

=== Nebraska ===
Lincoln AFB Defense Area (LI): The missiles provided defense for SAC B-47 bombers and Atlas missiles stationed at and around Lincoln AFB between 1960 and 1966. Offutt AFB Defense Area (OF): Provided a Nike Hercules defense for Omaha's Offutt AFB, which was the Headquarters of the Strategic Air Command. Offutt also hosted SAC tankers and Atlas missiles were deployed around the area in the early 1960s. An Army Air-Defense Command Post (AADCP) was established at Omaha AFS, NE in 1959 for Nike missile command-and-control functions. The site was equipped with the AN/GSG-5(V) BIRDIE solid-state computer system. The AAFC was integrated with the USAF Air Defense Command/NORAD Semi Automatic Ground Environment (SAGE) air defense radar network as Site P-71 / Z-71. The site was inactivated on 8 Sep 1968.	Nebraska Nike Missile Sites

Site Name	Missile Type	Defense Area	Site Location	Service Dates	Control Site condition/owner	Launch Site condition/owner
LI-01	Nike 3AG/12H/12L-H	Lincoln	Ceresco/Davey, Nebraska	1960 – Jun 1966	Raymond Central High School some buildings intact but site greatly modified for school 41°01′24″N 096°44′50″W	Above-ground magazines protected by berms. Abandoned, in private hands. Buildings standing and in use. Being used as an auto junkyard, large numbers of junk cars stored in missile firing pads. 41°02′10″N 096°44′25″W
LI-50	Nike 3AG/12H/!@L-H	Lincoln	Martell, Nebraska	1960 – Jun 1966	In private ownership. Buildings in good condition and in use. Undetermined purpose Site largely intact barracks has been torn down. One radar tower standing. 40°39′18″N 096°49′41″W	Fenced and gated above-ground magazines protected by berms. Buildings still standing, missile firing area in good condition. A few vehicles being stored in abandoned berm area, appears in good shape. Used for herding rams and storage. 40°38′45″N 096°49′25″W
OF-10	Nike 3AG/12H/12L-H	Offutt AFB	Treynor, Iowa	1960–1966	Green Hills Area Education Agency Central Office. Buildings in good shape. 41°13′50″N 095°42′49″W	Above-ground firing site, although no berms visible. Private ownership, good shape. 41°13′50″N 095°41′57″W
OF-60	Nike 3AG/12H/12L-H	Offutt	Louisville, Nebraska	1960–1966	FDS. In private hands. Buildings in good shape, Radar tower bases visible. 40°59′18″N 096°04′26″W	FDS. In private hands, appears in good shape. 40°59′00″N 096°05′28″W

=== New Jersey ===
There were sixteen Nike related sites within the State of New Jersey, all of which were classed as supporting either the New York or Philadelphia defense areas. Refer to the respective state section (New York or Pennsylvania) for information related to New Jersey located Nike sites.

- New York (NY-53: Leonardo/Belford, NY-54: Holmdel, NY55DC: Highlands, NY-56: Sandy Hook, NY-58/60: Old Bridge, NY-65: South Plainfield, NY-73: Summit/Watchung, NY-79/80: East Hanover / Livingston, NY-88: Mountain View/Wayne, NY-93/94: Ramsey/Darlington/Mahwah)
- Philadelphia (PH-23/25: Lumberton, PH-32: Marlton, PH-41/43: Erial, PH-49: Mantua, PH-64DC: Gibbsboro, PH-58: Woolwich)

Links: Sandy Hook Tours :: Site NY-56 :: Gateway National Park :: NJ 14 Missile Bases :: NY-56 History :: Trip Advisor :: Highlands Air Force Station :: Nike Missile Locations New Jersey

=== New Mexico ===
Walker AFB Defense Area (W): As a Strategic Air Command base, it was determined that Walker should be defended by a Nike Hercules battalion. The 6/2d was activated at Walker on 20 April 1960; it was then inactivated on 25 June 1960, without ever being declared operational, the construction then subsequently abandoned.	Walker AFB Defense Area

Site Name	Missile Type	Defense Area	Site Location	Service Dates	Control Site condition/owner	Launch Site condition/owner
W-10	Nike 3AG (never operational)	Walker	Roswell, New Mexico	Never operational	Intact, NMArNG Miliray Academy. Buildings standing, looks abandoned. 33°25′20″N 104°20′50″W	Intact, MNArNG training site. Abandoned. 33°26′09″N 104°20′07″W
W-50	Nike 3AG (never operational)	Walker	Hagerman, New Mexico	Never operational	Demolished, Roswell Correctional Center Partially; 33°08′27″N 104°32′34″W	Intact, abandoned. Built on a former World War II auxiliary field (#3) of Roswell AAF. 33°07′34″N 104°32′38″W
Launch Site One	Nike 1B, 2C/18H, 30A/12L-UA, (7L-H)	No Defense Area	McGregor Guided Missile Range, New Mexico	1957 – Dec 1992	FDS	FDS

=== New York ===
Niagara Falls–Buffalo Defense Area (NF, BU): Buffalo and Niagara Falls were separate Defense Areas until their merger in December 1961. Before consolidation, the Niagara Falls Defense Area was commanded from historic Fort Niagara. Both Regular Army and Army National Guard Units operated these batteries. The Army Air-Defense Command Post (AADCP) NF-17DC established at Lockport AFS, NY in 1960 for Nike missile command-and-control functions. The site was an AN/FSG-l Missile-Master Radar Direction Center. NF-17DC was integrated with the USAF Air Defense Command/NORAD Semi Automatic Ground Environment (SAGE) air defense radar network as Site P-21 / Z-21. Nike operations at the site inactivated in 1962. New York Defense Area (NY): Combined with the sites located in New Jersey, the New York sites composed one of the largest defensive nets in the nation. Headquarters facilities were located at Tappan, Fort Totten, Fort Wadsworth, and Roslyn. Initially, New York's air defenses had been manually coordinated from Fort Wadsworth on Staten Island. Later, Army Air-Defense Command Post (AADCP) NY-55DC was established at Highlands AFS, NJ in June 1960 for Nike missile command-and-control functions. The site was an AN/FSG-l Missile-Master Radar Direction Center. Later the AN/TSQ-51 "Missile Mentor" solid-state computer system was installed. NY-55DC was integrated with the USAF Air Defense Command/NORAD Semi Automatic Ground Environment (SAGE) air defense radar network as Site P-9 / Z-9 Air Force operations at the site ended on 1 July 1966, and Nike operations were inactivated on 31 Oct 1974. As in several other states, during the 1960s the National Guard assumed a greater role in operating the sites.	Niagara Falls–Buffalo Defense Area New York Defense Area

Site Name	Missile Type	Defense Area	Site Location	Service Dates	Control Site condition/owner	Launch Site condition/owner
BU-09	Nike 1B, 2C/30A/12L-A	Niagara/ Buffalo	Ransom Creek/ Millersport, New York	1956 – Dec 1961	FDS. Some military buildings being used by city as offices. Most of site has been obliterated, fenceline visible in aerial imagery. 43°03′14″N 078°43′13″W	FDS. Buildings in good condition, magazine area in use by the city police department as a vehicle storage area. 43°03′49″N 078°42′38″W
BU-18	Nike 3B/18H, 30A/12L-U	Niagara/ Buffalo	Lancaster/ Milgrove, New York	1956 – Mar 1970	FDS. Lancaster (town) Police Department and local government office. Largely redeveloped, although several old IFC buildings still used. 42°55′46″N 078°37′12″W	FDS. Appears in good condition, buildings in use. Magazine area used by construction company for equipment repair/storage. Electrified with working elevators. 42°55′50″N 078°35′49″W
BU-34/35	Nike 2B, 4C/60A/24L-AA	Niagara/ Buffalo	Orchard Park, New York (dual site)	1956 – Mar 1963	FDS. Vacant land. Some IFC roads exist, no structures. 42°47′34″N 078°41′56″W	FDS. Largely obliterated. Buildings at beginning of entrance road, former underground double magazine. Aerial image shows faint evidence of launcher area appears to be covered with soil. 42°46′34″N 078°40′06″W
BU-52	Nike 2B, 4C/60A/24L-AA	Niagara/ Buffalo	Hamburg, New York (dual site)	1956 – Dec 1961	The IFC was located off New Lake View Road, at 2 E. Heltz Road, and is now offices for the Town of Hamburg and as part of Lakeview Road Recreation Area. Obliterated. 42°42′37″N 078°53′30″W	Was a double-site Launcher and Integrated Fire Control Area for Nike-Ajax Missiles. In use by state highway department and is currently covered by a bike track, a Hamburg Town Park, and Bulk Storage. New buildings erected. 42°42′37″N 078°54′06″W
NF-03	Nike 2B, 4C/60A/24L-AA	Niagara/ Buffalo	Model City, New York (dual site)	1955–1963	FDS. Abandoned IFC site. Porter Center Road divides site into west and east sections. Buildings exist on east side of road, appear to be in poor condition and overgrown. West side of site largely forested with little evidence of use. 43°12′59″N 078°57′32″W	FDS. Former double-magazine site abandoned and mostly overgrown with vegetation. The launcher site was acquired by the USAF in 1965 and become the Youngstown Test Site. This site was the western end of a test range under the jurisdiction of Griffiss AFB. Closed at an unknown date. Today, a few foundations of buildings visible, launch area exists, condition unknown probably filled with water. 43°13′43″N 078°57′46″W
NF-16	Nike 2B, 4C/18H, 30A/24L-UA, (11L-H)	Niagara/ Buffalo	Sanborn/ Cambria, New York (dual site)	1955 to Mar 1970	Private ownership. Barracks building in use, several radar towers still standing. Appears to be light office building. 43°09′31″N 078°50′23″W	Cambria Municipal offices, appears to be converted into maintenance storage yard. Few buildings left, faint traces of one magazine but very little of Launch site remains. 43°09′41″N 078°49′06″W
NF-41	Nike 1B, 2C/18H/11L-U	Niagara/ Buffalo	Grand Island, New York (Formerly dual NF-74/NF-75)	Apr 1959 – Mar 1970	Private ownership. Is now known as Nike Base Town Park; as such, it hosts Grand Island's Senior Citizen Center, a town-sponsored safe hangout for teens known as Reality Cafe, and space for group meetings. A few military buildings still in use, new construction. 43°01′07″N 079°00′47″W	Is now used as the Grand Island Central School District's Eco Island Ecology Reserve. Former triple-magazine site now abandoned. Large piles of earth on top of magazines, some vehicles parked in magazine area visible in aerial images. LC buildings along Staley road still in use. 43°00′32″N 079°00′56″W
NY-03/04	Nike 2B, 1C/18H, 30A/24L-UA, (12L-H)	New York	Orangeburg/ Mount Nebo, New York (dual site)	1955 – Apr 1974	Some old IFC buildings in use being used by the Town of Orangeburg. 41°01′57″N 073°57′03″W	Intact, USAR Center – Orangeburg. Batteries paved over with asphalt, new building construction. 41°02′16″N 073°56′29″W
NY-09	Nike 1B, 2C/30A/12L-A	New York	Kensico/ White Plains, New York	1955–1963	FDS. Now "Nike Overlook Park". IFC mostly taken over by woods, some buildings still stand, asphalted area badly cracked. 41°03′19″N 073°55′41″W	FDS Launch site adjacent to NY-03/04. 41°02′16″N 073°56′33″W
NY-15	Nike 2B/20A/8L-A	New York	Fort Slocum, New York	1955 – Jul 1960	Abandoned. David's Island. Buildings torn down, some sidewalks left. Not much else. 40°53′07″N 073°46′09″W	Abandoned. Hart Island, Double Magazines covered over with vegetation on north end of island; Buildings spread out all over the island, all appear in highly deterioration condition. 40°51′29″N 073°46′16″W
NY-20	Nike 1B, 2C/20A/12L-A	New York	Lloyd Harbor/ Huntington, New York	Jan 1957 – 1962.	In the 1970s, the partially dismantled site was part of the Friends World College campus. Now obliterated, High-end single-family housing, no evidence of IFC. 40°54′22″N 073°27′33″W	Obliterated, High-end single-family housing, possibly some partial remains covered by trees and vegetation. 40°53′50″N 073°28′21″W
NY-23	Nike 1B, 2C/20A/12L-A	New York	Brookville/ Oyster Bay, New York	1955–1963	Obliterated, High-end single-family housing, no evidence of IFC. 40°48′22″N 073°33′37″W	Magazine remains, concreted over. Owned by the Nassau Board of Cooperative Education, which uses the site as the Brookville Nature Park and Outdoor Education Center. 40°48′38″N 073°32′53″W
NY-24	Nike 3B/18H, 30A/12L-U	New York	Amityville/ Farmingdale, New York	1957 – Apr 1974	Obliterated, new office building construction, in highly urban area. No evidence of IFC. 40°42′49″N 073°25′35″W	Either Army Reserve or NY National Guard site. New building for armory, no FC buildings remain. Missile launchers asphalted over but some doors still visible. Launcher area now motor pool for military vehicles. 40°42′30″N 073°24′20″W
NY-25	Nike 1B, 2C/18H, 30A/10L-U	New York	Defense Hill Rd, East Shoreham, New York	1957 – Jun 1971	Mostly cleared land, some roads of IFC remain but that's about it. Perimeter fence appears to be still standing, taken over by vegetation, however outline is clear in aerial imagery. Housing area intact, in private ownership. Former access road to IFC remains, highly deteriorated and partially taken over by vegetation. Part of the IFC has been redeveloped into unorganized sports facility. 40°57′00″N 072°52′07″W	Triple magazine now motor pool area for Army Reserve unit. Also storage yard. 40°56′25″N 072°52′20″W
NY-29/30	Nike 2B, 4C/60A/24L-AA	New York	Lido Beach, New York (dual site)	1955–1963	Redeveloped into large school and recreational area of the Long Beach School District. IFC Obliterated. 40°35′36″N 073°38′04″W	Triple magazines visible, overgrown and abandoned. Many of the original structures, fencing, pavement, light poles, etc., still remain. Also being used by School District for school bus parking 40°35′33″N 073°36′54″W
NY-49	Nike 4B/18H, 30A/16L-U	New York	Fort Tilden, Rockaway Point Road, New York	1955 – Apr 1974	Intact, Gateway National Recreation Area. All buildings razed, partially reused by parking lot and West Bayshore Blve. No evidence of IRC except some disturbed land where structures once were. 40°33′30″N 073°53′49″W	Intact, US Park Service, very deteriorated condition. 40°33′41.55″N 073°53′16.51″W
NY-53	Nike 1B, 2C/30A/12L-A	New York	Leonardo/ Belford, New Jersey	1957–1963	FDS Location Undetermined Possibly incorporated into Naval Weapons Station Earle.	FDS Location Undetermined. Redeveloped into single-family home sites. 40.39052°N 74.08783°W
NY-54	Nike 2B/12H, 20A/8L-U	New York	Holmdel Township, New Jersey	1955 – Nov 1968	Redeveloped into Phillips Park. No evidence of IFC. 40°23′40″N 074°10′17″W	Redeveloped into park and recreation area. No evidence of LS. 40°22′39″N 074°11′15″W
NY-56	Nike 4B/24H, 40A/16L-UU	New York (dual site)	Sandy Hook, New Jersey	1960 – Jun 1971	Located on the former Sandy Hook Proving Ground (now a part of the Gateway National Recreation Area) in New Jersey, has been preserved and is open to the public. The IFC area is open one weekend a month from April to October. Numerous buildings and radar platforms exist. 40°26′53″N 073°59′36″W	The launcher area has occasional tours. The park currently owns three Ajax missiles and one Hercules. Every fall, the park holds a Cold War Day event. Site NY-56 is listed in the National Register of Historic Places as part of the Sandy Hook Proving Ground Historic District. Twin magazine, abandoned, buildings in use, concrete in launcher area weathered by ocean and salt air. 40°26′01″N 073°59′07″W
NY-58/60	Nike 2B/12H, 20A/8L-U	New York	Old Bridge, New Jersey	1955 – Nov 1968	Obliterated, only foundations remain, Township owned 40°25′05″N 074°18′45″W	Obliterated, paved over for school bus parking lot. No evidence remains of LS. 40°25′02″N 074°18′34″W
NY-65	Nike 2B/12H, 20A/8L-U	New York	South Plainfield, New Jersey	1955 – Jun 1971	Redeveloped into single-family housing, no evidence of IFC. 40°32′37″N 074°23′34″W	Redeveloped into Hadley Shopping Center and a light industrial park. Obliterated. 40°33′02″N 074°24′40″W
NY-73	Nike 1B, 2C/30A/12L-A	New York	Summit/ Watchung, New Jersey	1958 – Apr 1963	Redeveloped into Governor Livingston Regional High School. 40°41′11″N 074°23′14″W	Abandoned, deteriorating, 40°40′48″N 074°23′28″W
NY-79/80	Nike 2B, 4C/18H, 30A/23L-UA, (12L-H)	New York	East Hanover, New Jersey / Livingston, New Jersey (dual site)	1955 – Apr 1974	Essex County Park District, developed into Riker Hill Park. The control area was located atop Riker Hill (now Riker Hill Art Park) in Livingston in order to obtain good radar coverage of the region. IFC now obliterated. 40°47′57″N 074°20′19″W	This double Nike site located in nearby East Hanover was operational with both Ajax and Hercules missiles. Largely Obliterated, some remains in semi-wooded area. 40°48′22″N 074°21′54″W
NY-88	Nike 1B, 2C/30A/12L-A	New York	Mountain View/ Wayne, New Jersey	1955–1963	Redeveloped into high-end single-family housing. No evidence of IFC - Correction - IFC was located at the top of a hill on the corner of Ratzer and Alps Roads including radar towers as late as 1980. 40°56′57″N 074°14′43″W	Site used as vehicle storage for county vehicles, and other public services. Guard shack still visible, launcher site clearly visible, and administrative buildings still in use. 40°55′49″N 074°15′52″W
NY-93/94	Nike 4B, 2C/18H, 30A/24L-UA, (12L-H)	New York	Ramsey/ Darlington/ Mahwah, New Jersey	1955 – Jun 1971	Now wooded area. 41°02′14″N 074°11′54″W	Now upscale housing development 41°03′55″N 074°11′18″W
NY-99	Nike 3B/30A/12L-A	New York	Spring Valley/ Ramapo, New York	1956–1963	Partially Intact, East Ramapo School District. 41°08′47″N 074°03′35″W	Partially Intact, East Ramapo School District. Paved over parking lot for trucks.. 41°08′47″N 074°02′21″W

=== Ohio ===
Cincinnati–Dayton Defense Area (CD): The sites became operational in 1960 to defend the industrial centers of the upper Ohio River Valley. A "BIRDIE" site collocated at C-27 hosted missile command and control functions for the region. The sites remained active until 1970–1971. Cleveland Defense Area (CL): Headquarters facilities were located at the Shaker Heights Armory and in Cleveland. Sites CL-02, CL-ll, and CL-69 were converted to fire Nike Hercules missiles. In 1968, the Cleveland Defense Area merged with Detroit's. In June 1971, the three remaining Nike Hercules batteries were deactivated.	Cincinnati–Dayton Defense Area Cleveland Defense Area

Site Name	Missile Type	Defense Area	Site Location	Service Dates	Control Site condition/owner	Launch Site condition/owner
CD-27	Nike 3D/18H/12L-U	Cincinnati–Dayton	Wilmington, Ohio	Mar 1960 – Mar 1970	Now light industrial area, some old IFC buildings still in use 39°24′31″N 083°53′44″W	Intact, Private ownership. Most buildings in good condition, magazine in good condition. 39°24′02″N 083°52′57″W
CD-46	Nike 3D/18H/12L-U	Cincinnati–Dayton	Felicity, Ohio	Apr 1960 – Mar 1970	Formerly used by the OHArNG, C Company, 216th Engineers. Now in private ownership. Buildings in good condition, no radar towers. 38°51′05″N 084°09′20″W	Buildings in good condition, magazine being used as tractor trailer parking and storage site. 38°50′38″N 084°08′35″W
CD-63	Nike 3D/18H/12L-U	Cincinnati–Dayton	Dillsboro, Indiana	Apr 1960 – Mar 1970	Buildings in good condition, the old radar towers are still standing. 39°00′28″N 085°00′36″W	Missile Launching site converted to a private residence (including old missile silos) on Ind. 262 just outside the town limits. Buildings in good condition, magazine being used as tractor trailer parking and storage site. 39°00′04″N 085°02′02″W
CD-78	Nike 3D/18H/12L-U	Cincinnati–Dayton	Oxford, Ohio	Mar 1960 – Mar 1970	Private ownership, in excellent condition. Buildings in good condition, also several radar towers. The installation also serves as a haunted house in September and October; 39°33′01″N 084°46′22″W	Private ownership, Radio transmitter, Cell tower built on site. Magazine area has been partially filled in, severe cracking of concrete, abandoned. The site is currently used as a small arms firing range and a radio tower has been built there. Groundwater contamination is a problem at the site. 39°33′27″N 084°47′32″W
CL-02	Nike 3B/18H, 30A/12L-U	Cleveland	Bratenahl, OH	1956 – Jun 1971	Some buildings standing, Now USG Plant. They were disguised as Propane tanks.no radar towers. 41°32′28″N 081°37′33″W	Triple battery next to Lake Erie. Now a parking lot. 41°32′35″N 081°37′37″W
CL-11	Nike 3B/18H, 30A/12L-U	Cleveland	Painesville, Ohio	1958 – Jun 1971	Private ownership. Buildings demolished in December 2020. 41°43′20″N 081°16′27″W	County Engineers Office. Used as a storage area. Appears in good condition. 41°43′39″N 081°17′10″W
CL-13	Nike 3B/30A/12L-A	Cleveland	Willowick, Ohio	1956–1963	Redeveloped into Robert Manry Park. The only IFC building left is a small pump house. 41°37′41″N 081°28′09″W	Wiloughby – Eastlake School District. In reasonable condition. The magazines have a one-foot thick cap of concrete on them. All air vents, stairwells, hatches, etc. have been removed. Magazine area used for school bus parking. 41°37′53″N 081°27′06″W
CL-34	Nike 3B/30A/12L-A	Cleveland	Warrensville, Ohio	1956–1963	Obliterated. All buildings torn down, only disturbed areas with some concrete building pads and former streets. 41°27′08″N 081°30′11″W	Obliterated. Redeveloped into shopping center. 41°26′48″N 081°29′44″W
CL-48	Nike 1B, 2C/30A/12L-A	Cleveland	Garfield Heights, Ohio / Independence, Ohio	1956 – Aug 1961	Some buildings still standing and in use by Independence Board of Education. 41°24′27″N 081°36′26″W	Used by the Independence Local Schools. magazine paved over for school bus parking and as an outdoor education center 41°23′13″N 081°38′01″W
CL-59	Nike 1B, 2C/30A/12L-A	Cleveland	Parma/ Midpark Station, Ohio	1956 – Aug 1961	Redeveloped into Nathan Hale Park. 41°22′14″N 081°45′40″W	Redeveloped into Cuyahoga Community College, Western Campus; 41°21′52″N 081°45′54″W
CL-67	Nike 3B/30A/12L-A	Cleveland	Lakefront Airport, Ohio	1956–1963	Now City of Cleveland J L Stamps District Service Center; 41°31′19″N 081°39′55″W	Part of Runway L6 Cleveland Lakefront Airport; 41°31′13″N 081°40′57″W
CL-69	Nike 3B/18H, 30A/12L-U	Cleveland	Fairview Park, Ohio	1956 – Jun 1971	Baseball Field, Part of Cleveland Tri-City Park; 41°27′06″N 081°52′25″W	Tennis Courts, Part of Cleveland Tri-City Park; 41°27′11″N 081°52′23″W

=== Pennsylvania ===
Philadelphia Defense Area (PH): In the mid-1950s, the Philadelphia District of the Corps of Engineers supervised the construction of a circle of 12 Nike Ajax sites averaging 25 miles from Center City. Nike Ajax sites were deactivated from 1961 to 1963. Site PH-75 was deactivated in 1968; PH-99 stayed on duty until 1971. These batteries were manned by both Regular Army and Pennsylvania Army National Guard units. Army Air-Defense Command Post (AADCP) PH-64DC established at Gibbsboro AFS, NJ in 1960 for Nike missile command-and-control functions. The site was an AN/FSG-l Missile-Master Radar Direction Center. On 1 May 1961 PH-64DC was integrated with the USAF Air Defense Command/NORAD Semi Automatic Ground Environment (SAGE) air defense radar network as Site RP-63/Z-63 Nike operations were inactivated on 30 Sep 1966 Pittsburgh Defense Area (PI): At first, three active Army battalions manned the ring around "Steel City". Later manning responsibilities would eventually be supplied by one active duty unit (3rd Missile Battalion, 1st Artillery) and one Pennsylvania Army National Guard battalion (The Duquesne Greys-2nd Missile Battalion, 176th Artillery). Operations at five of these Nike Hercules sites lasted until 1974. Army Air-Defense Command Post (AADCP) PI-70DC established at Oakdale AI, PA in 1960 for Nike missile command-and-control functions. The site was initially an AN/FSG-l Missile-Master Radar Direction Center. It was later upgraded to the AN/TSQ-51 "Missile Mentor" solid-state computer system. PI-70DC was integrated with the USAF Air Defense Command/NORAD Semi Automatic Ground Environment (SAGE) air defense radar network as Site RP-62 / Z-62. Air Force operations ended 31 Dec 1969. The AADCP inactivated on 1 Sep 1974.	Philadelphia Defense Area Pittsburgh Defense Area

Site Name	Missile Type	Defense Area	Site Location	Service Dates	Control Site condition/owner	Launch Site condition/owner
PH-07	Nike 2B/30A/8L-A	Philadelphia	Richboro, Pennsylvania	1956 – Sep 1961	The IFC area is occupied by the Council Rock School District administration. Some IFC buildings still in use. 40°13′41″N 074°59′56″W	Launch site is part of the Northampton Township Recreation Center. Batting cages have been placed on top of the two missile magazines, which appear otherwise intact. 40°13′15″N 074°59′41″W
PH-15	Nike 1B. 2C/30a/12L-A	Philadelphia	Bristol / Newportville/ Croydon, Pennsylvania	1955–1964	Private ownership. Wooded area behind Bristol Plaza Shopping Center and I-95 flyovers. Broken up concrete of building foundations, some partial streets, not much else. 40°07′39″N 074°53′14″W	Private ownership. Obliterated by new construction. Nothing left. 40°06′59″N 074°53′30″W
PH-23/25	Nike 2B, 4C/24H, 60A/22L-UA, (14L-H)	Philadelphia	Lumberton, New Jersey	1958 – Apr 1974	Township of Lumberton and private owner. Was Midway School. Demolished in 2016 to make way for housing. Two radar towers remain on private property owned by a landscaping company 39°57′51″N 074°47′01″W	Former double magazine. Township of Lumberton. Municipal complex storage yard. Some buildings still in use. Magazines visible and fully functional. 39°57′40″N 074°47′51″W
PH-32	Nike 2B/30A/8L-A	Philadelphia	Marlton, New Jersey	1956–1963	The site was purchased by a developer who intended to split the property, with the new Spring Run neighborhood to be built on the control area. In the mid-1990s, the site was sold to another developer who turned the control area into the Briarwood development. 39°52′21″N 074°53′41″W	PH-32 is a former Nike missile launch site in Evesham Township, New Jersey, United States. The 35-acre (140,000 m^{2}) base was opened on July 1, 1955, as part of a ring of 12 Nike sites intended to protect the population and military installations of the Philadelphia area during the Cold War from attack by Soviet bomber aircraft. During its operation, it had two magazines armed with Nike-Ajax missiles. At different periods in the base's history, it contained between 16 and 20 missiles. In 1963, the more advanced Nike-Hercules missile was distributed to some Nike bases. Because of this new missile, fewer sites were needed and PH-32, along with 7 other Philadelphia region bases, was shut down. After deactivation, PH-32 was sold to Burlington County for $32,000 and was used as the Burlington County Civil Defense Center. Its new role was meant to be a coordination center for civil defense in the event of attack, but it ended up being used as storage. Different parts of the site also took on various roles including a fire and police academy, school, and target range. The site was purchased by a developer with a school built on the launch area. While the project was approved, the development was never built. All buildings at the site were demolished in 1977. In the 1980s, water contamination near the base was found to be a health hazard. In 2002, Evesham Township had the launch area cleared of illegal dumps and demolition debris left from the buildings. During the cleanup, the magazine elevator doors were sealed with asphalt for safety reasons. 39°52′16″N 074°52′53″W
PH-41/43	Nike 2B, 4C/16H, 60A/23L-UA	Philadelphia	Erial, New Jersey	1956 – Apr 1974	After being closed by the Army in 1974, in 1976 the housing part of PH-41/43 was transferred to the Air Force for use by Gibbsboro AFS, New Jersey. It was designated as Gibbsboro Family Housing Annex. At some later time, probably about 1984, it was transferred back to the Army and assigned to Fort Dix. It was subsequently closed by 1990. Purchased by Gloucester Township and designated as a redevelopment site. 39°45′04″N 074°59′58″W	Gloucester Township, IFC is a vacant lot with woods, some old roads. Appears magazines were removed and filled in with dirt. 39°44′28″N 075°00′03″W
PH-49	Nike 1B, 2C/30A/12L-A	Philadelphia	Mantua Township, New Jersey	1956–1963	Redeveloped into Bethel Church and Glouchester County Christian School. Part of old access road still visible from Pitman Road. 39°44′13″N 075°09′36″W	Private ownership, Kraemer Construction Company. Buildings in use by company, magazine area visible being used as storage yard. Some buildings are still in good condition and currently occupied by private businesses. Two of the magazines are flooded. The larger primary magazine is still accessible by the stairwell and much of the original equipment is still there, including the missile racks and the elevator controls. 39°44′40″N 075°10′03″W
PH-58	Nike 1B, 2C/18H, 30A/12L-UA, (7L-H)	Philadelphia	Woolwich Township, New Jersey	1957 – Apr 1974	Site has been redeveloped. None of the original buildings or towers remain. 39°45′57″N 075°18′15″W	Abandoned. May be some building foundations and old roads. Severely overgrown with vegetation. Magazine area visible from aerial imagery. Very deteriorated. 39°46′21″N 075°18′1″W
PH-67	Nike 1B, 2C/30A/12L-A	Philadelphia	Village Green / Chester/Media, Pennsylvania	1955–1964	School and athletic fields. 39°51′45″N 075°25′45″W	Hilltop Elementary School, no remains. Magazines probably under asphalted parking lot. 39°51′00″N 075°26′15″W
PH-75	Nike 2B, 4C/18H, 60A/23L-UA, (11L-H)	Philadelphia	Edgemont/ Delaware County, Pennsylvania	1955 – Nov 1968	Abandoned in heavy woods. A few buildings overgrown with vegetation, some streets heavily overgrown. Two radar towers still stand. Not much left. 39°58′23″N 075°28′33″W	USAR Center. Magazines under motor pool parking area asphalted over. 39°57′48″N 075°28′11″W
PH-82	Nike 1B, 2C/30A/12L-A	Philadelphia	Paoli/ Valley Forge, Pennsylvania	1955–1962	Empty field, nothing remains. 40°05′02″N 075°27′23″W	High-end housing development, nothing remains. 40°03′57″N 075°28′47″W
PH-91	Nike 1B, 2C/30A/12L-A	Philadelphia	Worcester, Pennsylvania	1956–1963	Light office building, parking lot, also Worcester Nike Park. Some foundations of buildings, remainder of streets. 40°10′56″N 075°20′59″W	USAR Center. Magazines visible behind parking lot. 40°10′51″N 075°20′21″W
PH-97/99	Nike 4B, 2C/36H, 60A/22L-UU	Philadelphia	Warrington/ Eureka, Pennsylvania	1956 – Jul 1971	Twin Oaks Summer Camp. Several buildings still in use. 40°14′33″N 075°10′13″W	Now "Lower Nike Park". Some old roads remain. Magazines appear to be covered over with dirt but location still visible on aerial imagery. 40°14′21″N 075°09′49″W
PI-02	Nike 1B, 2C/30A/12L-A	Pittsburgh	Rural Ridge	Apr 1955 – Apr 1963	A few buildings in use by Teen Challenge; drug & alcohol rehab center. No radar towers. 40°34′15″N 079°49′47″W	PennDOT training site. Magazine area is used for earth moving equipment training. Magazines visible, some snow plows being stored on them. 40°35′48″N 079°49′21″W
PI-03	Nike 3B/18H, 30A/12L-U	Pittsburgh	Dorseyville/ Indianola	Oct 1956 – Mar 1974	American Indian Center Singing Winds Site. Well preserved site with numerous IFC buildings in use. Several radar towers standing. 40°34′49″N 079°53′43″W	Barracks building in use, most other buildings razed. Large areas of concrete piles visible in aerial imagery. Magazines visible, earth grading equipment moving dirt around area. 40°35′54″N 079°53′31″W
PI-25	Nike 1B, 2C/30A/12L-A	Pittsburgh	Plum, Pennsylvania/ Monroeville, Pennsylvania	Apr 1955 – 1960	Barracks and some minor buildings intcdt, also new industrial building constructed on back of site. No radar towers. 40°27′40″N 079°43′24″W	Redeveloped into A.E. O'Block Junior High, and Adlai Stevenson Elementary School. Some concrete foundations visible, Magazine now used as auxiliary gym. 40°28′20″N 079°42′52″W
PI-36	Nike 1B, 2C/18H, 30A/10L-U	Pittsburgh	Irwin, Pennsylvania	Apr 1955 – Dec 1968	Some IFC buildings in use. Redeveloped into Norwin Soccer Club, Norwin YMCA, Oak Hollow Seniors Center. 40°20′42″N 079°41′55″W	Off Nike Road. Obliterated. Residential housing plan. 40°20′46″N 079°41′01″W
PI-37	Nike 3B/18H, 30A/12L-U	Pittsburgh	Cowansburg/ Herminie, Pennsylvania	1956 – Mar 1974	Site appears unused. Many buildings standing, some razed. Several radar towers standing. 40°16′22″N 079°45′48″W	In use for light industry. Many buildings still in use, magazines still electrified and operable, used by owner for storage. 40°15′45″N 079°45′54″W
PI-42	Nike 1B, 2C/30A/12L-A	Pittsburgh	Elizabeth, Pennsylvania	1956 – Apr 1963	A few old IFC buildings in use, no radar towers. Used by the Elizabeth Forward School District. 40°15′02″N 079°51′23″W	Some buildings standing, used by the Twin Pines Council of Governments as a Police Firing Range. Magazine exists, concreted over. May be used as a parking lot. 40°13′54″N 079°50′12″W
PI-43	Nike 3B/18H, 30A/12L-U	Pittsburgh	Elrama, Pennsylvania	1955 – Mar 1974	Still in Army control, being used by the PAArNG; D/876th Engineer Battalion. Some buildings still in use, others torn down. No radar towers standing. 40°15′09″N 079°57′06″W	Abandoned. Was in use by Army Reserve and PA National Guard. Buildings still standing. Magazines visible, concrete heavily cracked. 40°15′15″N 079°57′59″W
PI-52	Nike 1B, 2C/30A/12L-A	Pittsburgh	Finleyville, Pennsylvania	1958 – Jul 1960	Most of site now South Hills Christian School. Some buildings in use, others very deteriorated. No signs of radar towers. 40°16′37″N 080°01′42″W	Mostly redeveloped, magazine area in poor condition, used as storage yard and parking lot. 40°15′53″N 080°01′04″W
PI-62	Nike 1B, 2C/30A/12L-A	Pittsburgh	Bridgeville/Hickman, Pennsylvania	1956 – Apr 1963	One building standing, sold to a local brewery and currently being refurbished into brewery and restaurant. Empty parking lots in deteriorating condition. Radar Towers intact, on nearby hill along Nike Site Road. 40°23′54.4″N 080°09′51.2″W	Some buildings standing, used for school bus storage. Magazines visible, condition unknown. 40°22′16″N 080°09′51″W
PI-71	Nike 1B, 2C/18H, 30A/10L-U	Pittsburgh	Coraopolis/Beacon, Pennsylvania	1955 – Mar 1974	Robinson Dept. of Public Works, poor condition, being used as a storage yard. 40°28′54″N 080°08′36″W	Abandoned. No buildings or signs of magazines. Appear to have been dug up and filled with earth. 40°29′01″N 080°09′50″W
PI-92	Nike 1B, 2C/30A/12L-A	Pittsburgh	Bryant/North Park	1956 – Apr 1963	Property given to North Allegheny School District. 40°34′31″N 080°00′05″W	Part of Allegheny County Police and Fire Training Academy. Magazines badly deteriorated, some used as parking lot. 40°35′25″N 080°00′33″W
PI-93	Nike 1B, 2C/18H, 30A/10L-H	Pittsburgh	West View, Pennsylvania	Oct 1956 – Jun 1971	Used by Army Corps of Engineers. 40°31′38″N 080°03′44″W	Obliterated, residential housing plan. 40°30′53″N 080°04′49″W

=== Rhode Island ===
Providence Defense Area (PR): Sites located in Rhode Island and southern Massachusetts for the defense of Rhode Island's capital city. From 1959 through 1960, sites PR-38 and PR-99 were upgraded to launch Nike Hercules missiles. Site PR-79 at Foster was preserved, to be used as a State Police facility. Site PR-99 at North Smithfield stayed in operation until 1971 while PR-38 at Bristol held on until 1974.	Providence Defense Area

Site Name	Missile Type	Defense Area	Site Location	Service Dates	Control Site condition/owner	Launch Site condition/owner
PR-19	Nike 1B, 2C/30A/12L-A	Providence	Rehoboth, Massachusetts	1956 – Jun 1971	MAArNG/USAR Center; 41°53′02″N 071°12′25″W	Sports Complex, some old military buildings still in use. 41°53′05″N 071°11′57″W
PR-29	Nike 1B, 2C/30A/12L-A	Providence	Swansea, Massachusetts	1956 – Jun 1959	Now a sports complex. Some old military buildings, off "Nike Site Road"; 41°46′59″N 071°10′38″W	Iron Mountain storage building erected on old Missile pad. Part of magazine visible. Old FC buildings in area in various states of deterioration and abandoned. 41°47′59″N 071°09′52″W
PR-38	Nike 1B, 2C/18H, 30A/10L-U	Providence	Bristol, Rhode Island	1956 – Apr 1974	Abandoned, overgrown with trees and vegetation. Likely most of site is under vegetation cover. 41°40′26″N 071°14′29″W	Redeveloped as Bristol County Development Center, no remains. 41°40′29″N 071°15′56″W
PR-58	Nike 1B, 2C/30A/12L-A	Providence	North Kingston/ Davisville, Rhode Island	1956–1963	North Kingston Parks and Recreation Department sports complex. One old military building remains. 41°37′48″N 071°26′11″W	LS completely removed. Empty lot cleared of all vegetation. Battalion Blvd remains. 41°36′58″N 071°25′58″W
PR-69	Nike 1B, 2C/30A/12L-A	Providence	Coventry, Rhode Island	1956 – Oct 1974	After its closure by the Army, on 25 Sep 1975 the control site property was designated the Coventry ANG Station, Air National Guard. It was assigned to the United States Property and Fiscal Officer, State of Rhode Island for real property jurisdiction and control. Formerly used by the RIANG, 281st CCG, 282d CBCS. Off "Nike Site Road"; 41°43′15″N 071°35′51″W	Coventry Park. Most buildings remain, appears some of the magazine as well. 41°41′29″N 071°37′50″W
PR-79	Nike 1B, 2C/30A/12L-A	Providence	Foster Center/ Foster, Rhode Island	1956 – Jun 1963	Some buildings remain, part of Foster/Gloucester Regional School District; 41°50′33″N 071°42′56″W	State of Rhode Island, State Police Academy and Training Center, buildings in use; magazines visible. 41°50′23″N 071°43′55″W
PR-99	Nike 1B, 2C/18H, 30A/11L-U, (10L-H)	Providence	North Smithfield/ Woonsocket, Rhode Island	1956 – Jun 1971	Currently North Smithfield Air National Guard Station (NSANGS), the home of 282d CBCS, some old buildings in use. 41°58′15″N 071°34′26″W	Rhode Island Army National Guard, most buildings intact, Magazine area used as a motor pool. 41°58′57″N 071°34′40″W

=== South Dakota ===
Ellsworth AFB Defense Area (E): Four Nike Ajax batteries were positioned around Ellsworth AFB in 1957. E-01 was north, E-20 was east-northeast, E-40 was south-southeast, and E-70 was west-southwest. Headquarters facilities were located at Ellsworth. In 1958, batteries E-20, E-40, and E-70 were removed from service and E-01 was converted to fire Nike Hercules missiles. This battery remained in service until 1961. An Army Air-Defense Command Post (AADCP) was established at Ellsworth AFB, SD in 1960 for Nike missile command-and-control functions. It was equipped with the AN/GSG-5(V) BIRDIE solid-state computer system. The post was integrated with the USAF Air Defense Command/NORAD Semi Automatic Ground Environment (SAGE) air defense radar network as Site M-97. The radar site ceased all operations on 15 August 1962.	Ellsworth AFB Defense Area

Site Name	Missile Type	Defense Area	Site Location	Service Dates	Control Site condition/owner	Launch Site condition/owner
E-01	Nike 1B, 2C/30A/12L-A	Ellsworth	5.2 miles N Ellsworth AFB	1957–1961	In use, some buildings still standing. No radar towers. 44°13′46″N 103°04′17″W	Abandoned. On or about 30 Dec 1963 the housing area next to the Launch Site was designated Ellsworth Family Housing Annex No 1, activated, and assigned to Ellsworth AFB. It was inactivated on 4 Nov 1970. Today, the housing is abandoned and the homes had been removed, leaving the basements exposed. Magazine visible, covered with vegetation and refuse. 44°12′15″N 103°05′52″W
E-20	Nike 1B, 2C/30A/12L-A	Ellsworth	5.3 miles ENE Ellsworth AFB	1957–1958	The IFC was assigned as an off-base installation to Ellsworth AFB on 25 May 1961. The Army housing was commonly referred to as East Nike Housing Area, and was controlled by Ellsworth AFB until about 2000. Today, the site is in use, some buildings still standing. No radar towers. 44°09′31″N 102°58′52″W	IFC buildings in use, housing adjacent abandoned and torn down. Magazine visible, covered with vegetation and refuse. 44°09′02″N 103°00′12″W
E-40	Nike 1B, 2C/30A/12L-A	Ellsworth	3.5 miles SSE Ellsworth AFB	1957–1958	In use, some buildings still standing. No radar towers. 44°05′16″N 103°05′12″W	After the Nike base was closed, it was gained by Ellsworth AFB on 30 Sep 1963, as Ellsworth Academic Annex (also referred to as South Nike Education Annex). As of Nov 1999, it was still on the Ellsworth AFB real property books, excess and awaiting disposition. Today, most buildings had recently been demolished. Magazine now an auto junkyard. 44°06′13″N 103°05′55″W
E-70	Nike 1B, 2C/30A/12L-A	Ellsworth	4.9 miles WSW Ellsworth AFB	1957–1958	The IFC was assigned as an off-base installation to Ellsworth AFB on 25 May 1961. The Army housing was commonly referred to as West Nike Housing Area, and was controlled by Ellsworth AFB until about 2000. Today, the buildings are still in use, some buildings still standing. No radar towers. 44°09′29″N 103°12′29″W	Abandoned, vegetation (tall trees) growing in Magazine concrete 44°09′11″N 103°12′59″W

=== Texas ===
Bergstrom AFB Defense Area (BG): Headquartered at Bergstrom AFB, Army units defended this Strategic Air Command Base and the Austin region from two Nike Hercules sites between 1960 and 1966. Dallas–Fort Worth Defense Area (DF): For air defense of Dallas/Fort Worth Metroplex. These Nike Hercules sites were manned by Regular Army and National Guard units and operated from 1960 to 1968. Army Air-Defense Command Post (AADCP) DF-30DC was established at Duncanville AFS, TX in 1959 for Nike missile command-and-control functions. The site was equipped with the AN/GSG-5(V) BIRDIE solid-state computer system. DF-30DC was integrated with the USAF Air Defense Command/NORAD Semi Automatic Ground Environment (SAGE) air defense radar network as Site P-78 / Z-78. Air Force operations ended 31 July 1964. The AADCP was inactivated in 1969. Dyess AFB Defense Area (DY): Installed to defend the SAC bombers and Atlas F missile silos stationed at and around Dyess AFB. Site DY-10, located at Fort Phantom Hill and site DY-50, located southwest of Abilene, remained operational from 1960 until 1966. An Army Air-Defense Command Post (AADCP) was established at Sweetwater AFS, TX in 1960 for Nike missile command-and-control functions. The site was equipped with the AN/GSG-5(V) BIRDIE solid-state computer system. The AADCP was integrated with the USAF Air Defense Command/NORAD Semi Automatic Ground Environment (SAGE) air defense radar network as Site M-89 / Z-89. The AADCP was inactivated in Sep 1969.	Texas Nike Missile Sites

Site Name	Missile Type	Defense Area	Site Location	Service Dates	Control Site condition/owner	Launch Site condition/owner
BG-40	Nike 3AG/12H/12L-H	Bergstrom	Elroy, Texas (SE)	Nov 1960 – Jun 1966	Abandoned. Appears to be mostly intact with buildings in various states of deterioration, several radar towers visible on aerial imagery. 30°06′18″N 097°35′30″W	Abandoned. Above-ground Nike-Hercules pads within protective berms. Missile assembly building appears standing, concrete missile pads deteriorated concrete. 30°05′30″N 097°35′16″W
BG-80	Nike 3AG/12H/12L-H	Bergstrom	Austin, Texas (WNW)	Nov 1960 – Jun 1966	Intact, TXArNG 111th Support Group; 30°18′20″N 097°50′24″W	Above-ground Nike-Hercules pads within protective berms. Site is now the location of the University of Texas System Police Academy. 30°18′52″N 097°52′00″W
DF-01	Nike 3D/18H/12L-U	Dallas Fort Worth	Denton, Texas (N)	Sep 1960 – Oct 1968	Intact, located off North Locust Street just north of Denton, Texas was converted for use as an astronomical observatory of the University of North Texas after decommissioning. Aside from its use as a laboratory for the school's astronomy program, the site has been used for storage, research and experimentation. The transmitter tower for UNT's campus radio station is also located on site. The site's housing and administrative complex was sold to a private owner and is currently being used as a residence. Has radar towers. 33°16′28″N 097°07′55″W	Underground single-magazine intact, no buildings, appears abandoned. 33°17′25″N 097°08′02″W
DF-20	Nike 3D/18H/12L-U	Dallas Fort Worth	Terrell, Texas (NE)	Aug 1960 – Feb 1964	Abandoned, most buildings collapsed, one radar tower still standing. 32°45′47″N 096°18′44″W	Underground single-magazine intact, Private Ownership. 32°46′00″N 096°17′42″W
DF-50	Nike 3D/18H/12L-U	Dallas Fort Worth	Alvarado, Texas	Aug 1960 – Oct 1968	Intact, Private ownership in good condition. Appears to be a tower also present. 32°23′26″N 097°10′01″W	Private ownership, mostly returned to agricultural use, single magazine is about all that is left. 32°22′48″N 097°10′9″W
DF-70	Nike 3D/18H/12L-U	Dallas Fort Worth	Fort Wolters, Texas	Sep 1960 – Oct 1968	Originally established during World War II as Camp Wolters. On 6 Mar 1951 it was redesignated Wolters Air Force Base. On 15 Dec 1956 jurisdiction, control, and accountability transferred back to the Army. Still in use, with a few buildings, one radar tower, TXArNG training. 32°50′48″N 098°02′42″W	Intact double underground magazine, Small arms storage, firing, and maneuvering range 32°51′00″N 098°03′35″W
DY-10	Nike 3AG/12H/12L-H	Dyess	Fort Phantom Hill, Texas (N)	Oct 1960 – Jun 1966	Intact, Abilene Independent School District, in good shape. 32°33′52″N 099°43′00″W	Above ground magazines protected by berms. Appears abandoned, covered by wild vegetation, Private ownership. 32°34′49″N 099°43′02″W
DY-50	Nike 3AG/12H/12L-H	Dyess	Abilene, Texas (12 mi SW)	Oct 1960 – Jun 1966	Complete with radar towers, in use, use unknown. 32°17′05″N 099°56′37″W	Above ground magazines protected by berms. Appears abandoned. 32°16′16″N 099°57′30″W

=== Virginia ===
Norfolk Defense Area (N): Headquarters facilities were located at Fort Monroe, Ballantine School in Norfolk, Reedsville/South Norfolk, Craddock Branch/Portsmouth, and Newport News. The world's largest naval complex received an extensive air defense network. Sites N-25, N-52, and N-85 were modernized to fire the Nike Hercules missile. Site N-63 was the last to operate Nike Ajax, being deactivated in November 1964. Both Regular Army and Virginia Army National Guard units contributed to the manning of the sites. Sites at (N-52) Deep Creek/Portsmouth and (N-85) Denbigh/Patrick Henry remained active until April 1974. An Army Air-Defense Command Post (AADCP) was established at Cape Charles AFS, VA in 1958 for Nike missile command-and-control functions. The site was equipped with the AN/GSG-5(V) BIRDIE solid-state computer system. The AADCP was later integrated with the USAF Air Defense Command/NORAD Semi Automatic Ground Environment (SAGE) air defense radar network as Site P-56 / Z-56'. The AADCP inactivated in June 1974.	Norfolk Defense Area

Site Name	Missile Type	Defense Area	Site Location	Service Dates	Control Site condition/owner	Launch Site condition/owner
N-02	Nike 2C, 1B/30A/12L-A	Norfolk	Fox Hill, Virginia	1955–1963	Fort Monroe, HQ Training and Doctrine Command. Buildings in good shape, no radar towers. 37°05′02″N 076°17′55″W	Fort Monroe, HQ Training and Doctrine Command, Buildings in good shape, magazines covered with earth. 37°05′29″N 076°17′12″W
N-25/29	Nike 4B, 2C/18H, 30A/24L-UA	Norfolk	Fort Story, Virginia	1957 – Jun 1971	Navy amphibious training site. Some buildings still in use, no towers, two concrete pilons still visible 36°55′51″N 076°01′28″W	Navy amphibious training site. Buildings in use. Magazines visible, status unknown. 36°55′23″N 076°01′07″W
N-36	Nike 1B, 2C/30A/12L-A	Norfolk	Kempsville, Virginia	1955–1964	City of Virginia Beach, Parks and Recreation offices. Also juvenile detention facility. 36°47′22″N 076°08′31″W	Parks and Recreation, maintenance, building in use. Magazine area now storage yard. 36°47′15″N 076°07′46″W
N-52	Nike 2B/18H, 30A/8L-UA	Norfolk	Deep Creek/ Chesapeake, Virginia	1955 – Apr 1974	Chesapeake Alternative School. 36°41′59″N 076°20′45″W	Public Safety Training Center. Buildings in use, magazines still intact, being used as a parking lot. 36°41′25″N 076°20′29″W
N-63	Nike 2B, 1C/30A/12L-A	Norfolk	Nansemond/ Suffolk, Virginia	1955 – Nov 1964	Being redeveloped into high-end single-family housing. Foundations visible in construction site. 36°51′11″N 076°28′02″W	Bennett's Creek Park. Some buildings in use, magazine area obliterated however land scarring visible where overfilled with soil. 36°51′04″N 076°28′42″W
N-75	Nike 1B, 2C/30A/12L-A	Norfolk	Smithfield/ Carrolton, Virginia	1955 – Jun 1961	Isle of Wight County Park "Nike Park". Some old buildings remain. Also quite a few junk vehicles. 36°58′32″N 076°33′28″W	Isle of Wight County Park. Magazine site is still very recognizable, with the surface concrete pad / blast deflectors and raised areas surrounding the former elevator doors still in place. 36°57′44″N 076°33′49″W
N-85	Nike 2B, 1C/18H, 30A/12L-UA, (8L-H)	Norfolk	Denbigh/ Patrick Henry, Virginia	1955 – Apr 1974	Peninsula Airport Commission. Abandoned and overgrown with weeds. Some buildings standing as well as radar towers. 37°08′24″N 076°29′57″W	Abandoned area, weeds, no remains of launchers. Some buildings may still be standing. 37°08′01″N 076°30′19″W
N-93	Nike 1B, 2C/30A/12L-A	Norfolk	Hampton/ Spiegelville, Virginia	1955–1963	USAR Center; 37°03′08″N 076°23′17″W	USAR Center Magazine area remains, concrete badly deteriorated.BR>37°03′34″N 076°23′44″W

=== Washington ===
Fairchild AFB Defense Area (F): Four sites initially protected the Spokane region and the Strategic Air Command Base at Fairchild. Medical Lake was converted to Hercules missiles in 1960 and 1961. Headquarters facilities were located at Fairchild AFB. The Army deactivated the Nike Ajax batteries in 1960. An Army Air-Defense Command Post (AADCP) was established at Mica Peak AFS in 1958 for Nike missile command-and-control functions. The site was equipped with the AN/GSG-5(V) BIRDIE solid-state computer system. The AAFC was integrated with the USAF Air Defense Command/NORAD Semi Automatic Ground Environment (SAGE) air defense radar network as Site SM-151 / Z-151. The AADCP was inactivated in May 1972. Hanford Defense Area (H): Nike missiles replaced and augmented gun batteries that had been previously installed to defend this nuclear industrial complex. Headquarters facilities were located at Camp Hanford. Three sites were deactivated in December 1958 as only Saddle Mountain was converted to the new Nike Hercules. Upon deactivation of this Hercules battery in 1960, the equipment was forwarded to the Norfolk site at Deep Creek/Portsmouth. Seattle Defense Area (S): Home of Boeing Aircraft Company and military installations, Seattle was ringed with defenses manned by both Regular Army and Washington National Guard units. Nike Ajax sites were phased out from 1960 to 1963. Sites at (S-13) Redmond, (S-61) Vashon Island, and (S-92) Bainbridge Island were upgraded to launch Nike Hercules missiles and survived until 1974. Army Air-Defense Command Post (AADCP) S-90DC established at Fort Lawton AFS, WA in 1960 for Nike missile command-and-control functions. The site was initially an AN/FSG-l Missile-Master Radar Direction Center. It was later equipped with the AN/GSG-5(V) BIRDIE solid-state computer system. S-90DC was integrated with the USAF Air Defense Command/NORAD Semi Automatic Ground Environment (SAGE) air defense radar network as Site RP-1 / Z-1 The Air Force ceased radar operations in March 1963 and the AADCP was inactivated 1 Sep 1974.	Fairchild AFB Defense Area Hanford Defense Area Seattle Defense Area

Site Name	Missile Type	Defense Area	Site Location	Service Dates	Control Site condition/owner	Launch Site condition/owner
F-07	Nike 2B, 1C/30A/12L-A	Fairchild	Spokane, Washington	1957 – Jun 1960	Was acquired by the United States Air Force during 1963 to be used as one of the command readout stations for the DMSP mission. It was operated by Detachment 1, 4000 Aerospace Applications Group, which was later designated as Detachment 1, 1000th Satellite Operations Group, and later the 5th Satellite Control Squadron part of the 50th Space Wing. It was later converted to the Fairchild Satellite Operations Center to support MILSTAR/GPS and other programs under Air Force Space Command. Some IFC buildings still in use. 47°42′10″N 117°34′39″W	Private Ownership. Magazines visible. 47°40′48″N 117°36′24″W
F-37	Nike 1B, 2C/30A/12L-A	Fairchild	Cheney, Washington	1957 – Jun 1960	Operated by the Washington Air National Guard as the Four Lakes Communications Station (1961–2009); operated by the Cheney School District (2009–present); 47°33′05″N 117°33′14″W	Operated by the Washington Air National Guard as the Four Lakes Communications Station (1961–2009); operated by the Cheney School District (2009–present); 47°32′31″N 117°32′46″W
F-45	Nike 2B, 1C/18H, 30A/12L-UA	Fairchild	Medical Lake, Washington	1957 – Mar 1966	Being used as an auto junkyard. Some buildings standing, even a few radar towers. 47°33′09″N 117°43′39″W	Abandoned, some buildings standing, magazine deteriorating but visible. 47°35′10″N 117°40′31″W
F-87	Nike 2B, 1C/18H/11L-U	Fairchild	Deep Creek, Washington	Sep 1958 – Mar 1966	Private ownership, electrical service, buildings and radar towers standing. 47°42′09″N 117°44′33″W	Private ownership. Some military buildings in use, new buildings erected over magazine. 47°39′38″N 117°42′55″W
H-06	Nike 2B/12H, 20A/8L-U	Hanford	Saddle Mountain, Washington	1955 – Dec 1960	Obliterated and abandoned, Department of Energy; 46°47′33″N 119°26′54″W	Obliterated and abandoned, Department of Energy; 46°44′54″N 119°25′26″W
H-12	Nike 2B/20A/8L-A	Hanford	Othello, Washington	1955 – Dec 1958	Obliterated and abandoned, Department of Energy; 46°41′33″N 119°23′09″W	Obliterated and abandoned, Department of Energy; 46°41′11″N 119°24′29″W
H-52	Nike 2B/20A/8L-A	Hanford	Rattlesnake Mountain, Washington	1955–1960	Intact, Department of Energy, facilities used as auxiliary research labs under Pacific Northwest National Laboratories oversight, currently scheduled for demolition. 46°23′42″N 119°35′45″W	Intact, Department of Energy, silo currently used as lab for University of Washington research projects. 46°23′31″N 119°32′03″W
H-83	Nike 2B/20A/8L-A	Hanford	Priest Rapids, Washington	1955 – Dec 1958	Obliterated and abandoned, Department of Energy; 46°40′22″N 119°42′18″W	Obliterated and abandoned, Department of Energy; 46°41′46″N 119°42′13″W
S-03	Nike 2B/20A/8L-A	Seattle	Bothell, Washington	1957 – Mar 1964	Obliterated, Horizon Heights Park and grass runway airfield 47°46′26″N 122°16′40″W	Partially Intact, FEMA Agency Region X HQ and US Army Reserve Hooper Center. Magazines appear to be once under asphalted-over parking lot, however, access to one lift platform is now covered with dirt and the magazine is filled with water. 47°47′24″N 122°14′11″W
S-13/14	Nike 2B, 4C/18, 60A/23L-UA, (11L-H)	Seattle	Redmond, Washington (dual site)	1957 – Mar 1974	Owned by the Lake Washington School District and leased to the Washington National Guard as the site of the Redmond Armory. The radars have been removed and portions of the site have been converted into "Nike Park"; 47°41′06″N 122°06′33″W	Dual magazines, in overgrown area, visible. 47°41′00″N 122°04′24″W
S-20	Nike 2B/20A/8L-A	Seattle	Cougar Mountain/ Issaquah, Washington	1957 – Mar 1964	Obliterated, Cougar Mountain County Park; 47°32′26″N 122°05′50″W	Obliterated, Cougar Mountain Regional Wildlife Park; 47°32′00″N 122°06′49″W
S-32	Nike 1B, 2C/20A/12L-A	Seattle	Lake Youngs, Washington	1956 – Dec 1961	Partially Intact, King County Sheriff's Department; 47°26′09″N 122°07′01″W	Intact, Maple Valley Christian School, South King County Activity Center (shared launch with S-33); 47°27′07″N 122°06′51″W
S-33	Nike 1B, 2C/20A/12L-A	Seattle	Lake Youngs/ Renton, Washington	1956 – Dev 1961	Intact, USAR Center, 104th Division, Training; 47°25′49″N 122°08′42″W	Intact, Maple Valley Christian School, South King County Activity Center (shared launch with S-32); 47°27′07″N 122°06′51″W
S-43	Nike 1B, 2C/30A/10L-A	Seattle	Kent/Midway, Washington	1956 – Feb 1963	Partially Intact. Radar mount mounds on north side of site visible from Military Rd. Entire site now the WA National Guard Kent Armory; 47°22′52″N 122°16′58″W	Now Grandview Off Leash Dog Park. City of SeaTac WA Parks Dept. Grounds intact. Three magazines in place but buried. Elevators cemented over. Six inch top soil cover. The roof of the magazines make up the "Upper Field" of the dog park. Dormitory, office spaces and missile maintenance shed were intact and operated by Kent Schools as the Mountain View Academy until their demolition in July 2019 to make room for River Ridge Elementary. 47°23′51″N 122°17′08″W
S-61	Nike 1B, 2C/18H, 30A/12L-UA, (7L-H)	Seattle	Vashon Island, Washington	1956 – Mar 1974	Partially Intact, Vashon High School; 47°25′01″N 122°27′46″W	Has been turned into a public horse park named Paradise Ridge. The buildings are now used as a thrift store, Granny's Attic, and a medical clinic. Also Nike Site Park; 47°24′39″N 122°29′01″W
S-62	Nike 1B, 2C/30A/12L-A	Seattle	Olalla, Washington	1958 – Mar 1963	Intact, Ollala Guest Lodge; 47°25′52″N 122°32′28″W	Partially Intact, Private ownership, being used as a junkyard for old vehicles. 47°25′10″N 122°33′20″W
S-81	Nike 1B, 2C/30A/12L-A	Seattle	Poulsbo, Washington	1956 – Nov 1960	Intact, North Kitsap School District and Frank Raab Municipal Park; 47°43′30″N 122°37′21″W	Redeveloped into retail center. 47°45′26″N 122°39′39″W
S-92	Nike 2B/12H, 20A/8L-U	Seattle	Bainbridge Island, Washington	1958 – Mar 1974	Eagledale Park and Strawberry Hill Park; 47°36′33″N 122°31′23″W	Launch structures completely removed except for some fences and a road and other infrastructure built for the missile site, Bainbridge Island Metropolitan Parks and Recreations District; 47°38′17″N 122°32′46″W

=== Wisconsin ===
Milwaukee Defense Area sites (code M) were all in Wisconsin, including 3 launch sites in the Milwaukee city limits (M-02, -20, & -96). The 2 battalion headquarters and nearby headquarters batteries were the 401st Antiaircraft Missile Bn & M-54's A Btry at "Hales Corners" and the 852nd Bn & M-96's D Btry at Maitland Field which was planned for 26 acres (11 ha) in 1954. The defense area with 5 sites was reorganized in 1961 "from group status to a battalion status", and its Army Air Defense Command Post near M-96 for integrating fire control began using an AN/GSG-5 BIRDIE after the solid-state CCCS became available in 1961. M-64 & M-96 had transferred to the Wisconsin National Guard by August 1961 (M-74 in June 1964), and command of the area transferred from the 61st Artillery Group to the 45th Air Defense Artillery Brigade on August 1, 1964. In 1968, the Milwaukee Defense Area merged with the Chicago–Gary Defense Area and was controlled using the latter's Arlington Heights AADCP with a 1967 AN/TSQ-51. The resulting Chicago-Milwaukee Defense Area included Wisconsin sites at Argyle (CM-71R), Princeton (CM-97R), and Tisch Mills (CM-01R 44°19′28″N 87°34′45″W) and 3 in Illinois and 4 in Michigan. One of the last sites transferred from the federal government was Waukesha's "Nike Hill" Integrated Fire Control site for M-74 in March 2006.

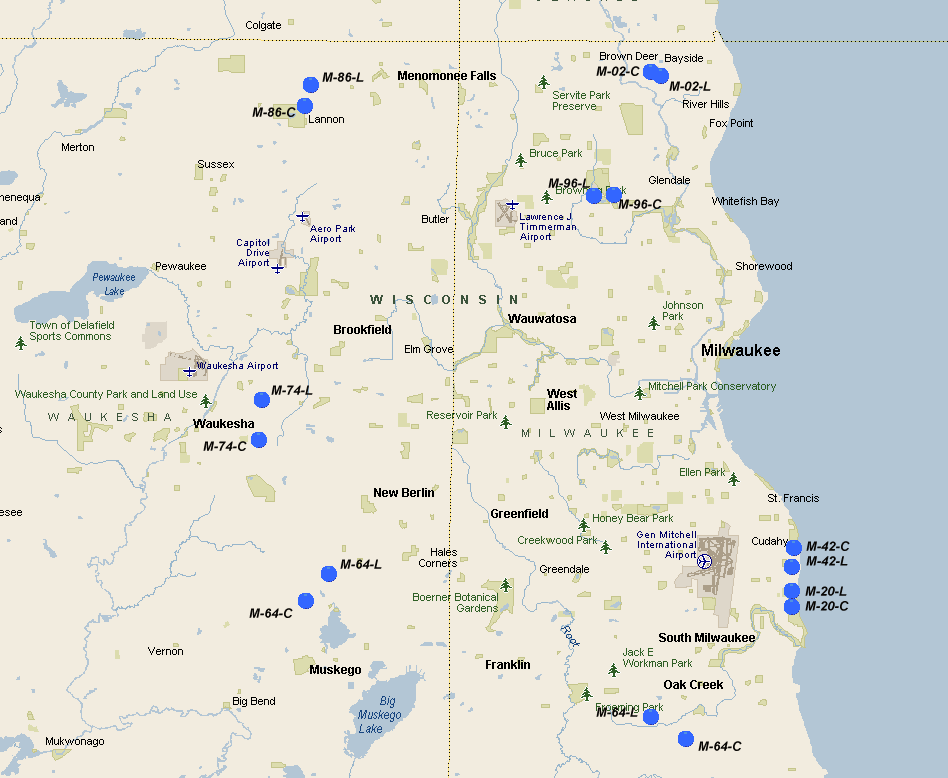
Milwaukee Defense Area

Code & location	Missile Type	Defense Area	Dates	Control Site condition/owner	Launch site condition/owner
M-02 Brown Deer Rd	1B, 2C/18H, 30A/12L-U	Milwaukee	1957 – June 1971	Woods & subdivision 43°10′35″N 087°56′01″W	Obliterated; 43°10′41″N 087°56′24″W
M-20 Harbor Drive	3B/18H, 30A/12L-U	Milwaukee	1957 – June 1971	Henry Maier Festival Park; 43°1′51″N 87°53′58″W	Henry Maier Festival Park; 43°1′51″N 87°53′58″W
M-42 Cudahy	1B, 2C/30A/12L-A	Milwaukee	1956 – August 1961	Senior Center; 42°56′2″N 87°50′55″W	Warnimont Park Golf Course; 42°56′38″N 87°50′50″W
M-54 "Hales Corners"	1B, 2C/30A/12L-A	Milwaukee	1956 – August 1961	Obliterated; Land owned by Milwaukee County House of Corrections; 42°52′28″N 88°0′15″W	Franklin Business Park; 42°51′53″N 87°59′0″W
M-64 Muskego/Prospect	1B, 2C/30A/12L-A	Milwaukee	1956 – March 1963	machine shop on Martin Dr. 42°56′29″N 088°08′50″W	Site at end of Adrian Drive. Assembly building is still present. Magazines are present, welded shut, and badly degraded. 42°55′04.5″N 088°09′57.6″W
M-74 Waukesha	1B, 2C/18H, 30A/12L-U, (10L-H)	Milwaukee	1956 – June 1971	structures remain in Hillcrest Park; 43°01′23″N 088°11′28″W	Obliterated, being redeveloped 43°00′16″N 088°11′35″W
M-86 Lannon	1B, 2C/30A/12L-A	Milwaukee	1956–1958	Demolished as of 2014. Radar facility used as storage for Lannon County Park and as a US Cellular tower site. All barracks but one have been demolished and land is unused. 43°09′43″N 088°09′49″W	Largely intact, private owner 43°10′19″N 088°09′34″W
M-96 Silver Spring Dr.	1B, 2C/30A/12L-A	Milwaukee	1956 – Mar 1963	Carleton Elementary School; 43°07′12″N 087°57′50″W	Army Reserve Complex; 43°07′11″N 087°58′37″W

=== Nike Site Gallery ===
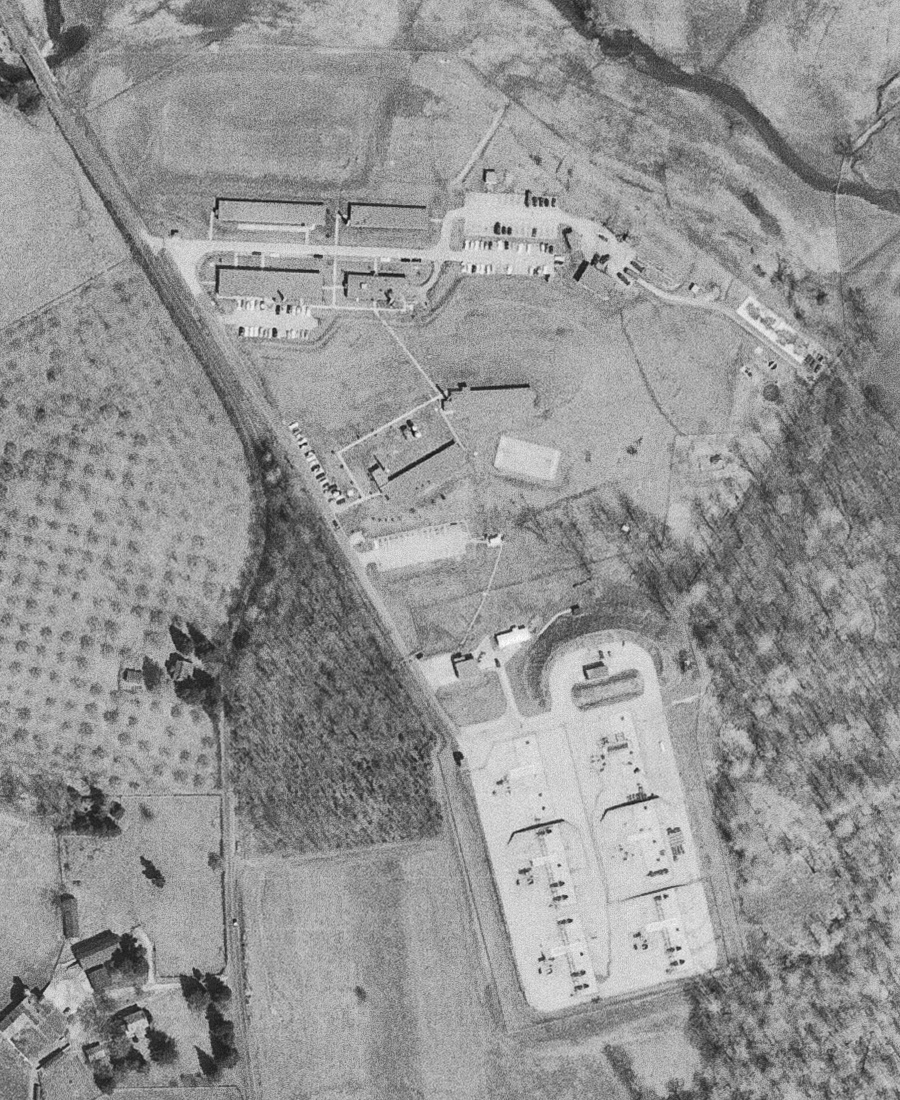
PH-75 Launch area in 1965

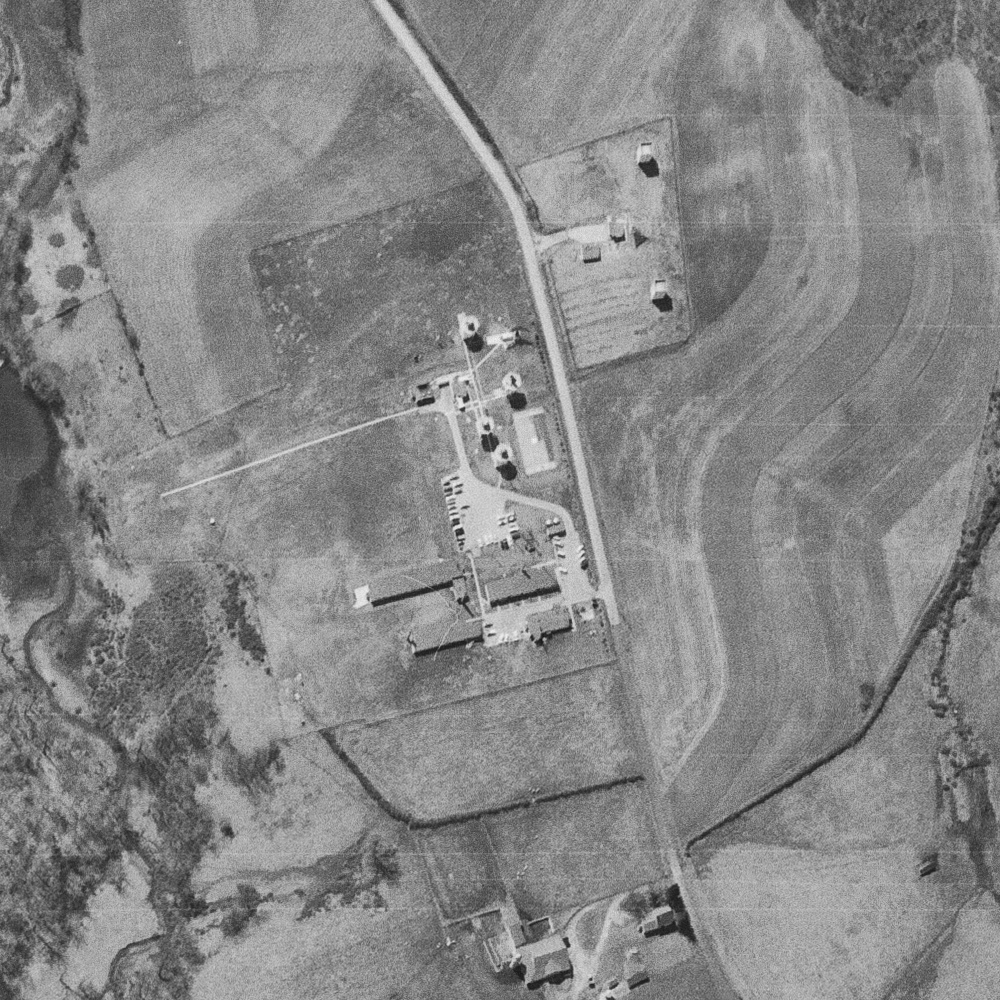
PH-75 Control Area in 1965

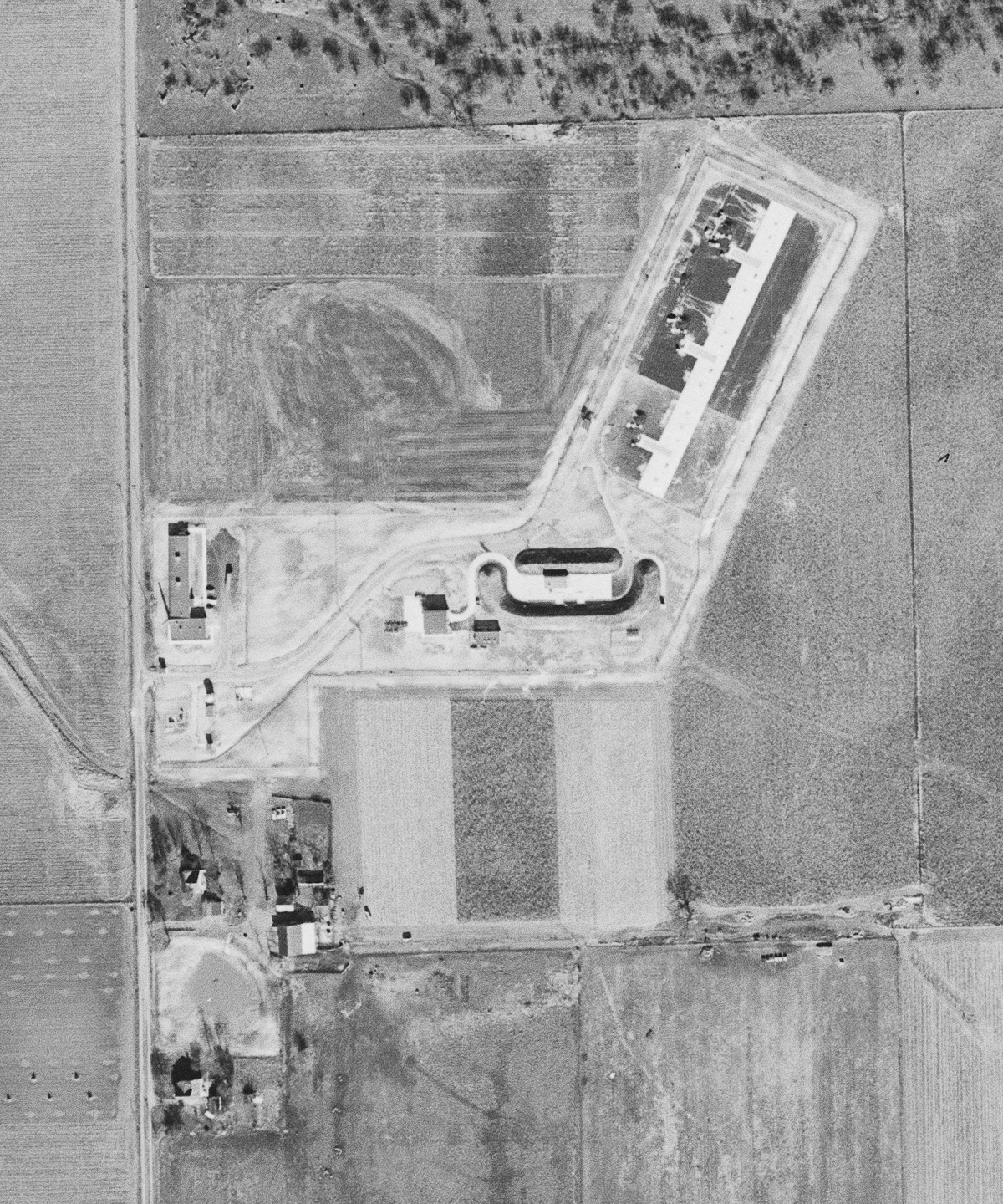
CD-78 Launch area in 1959

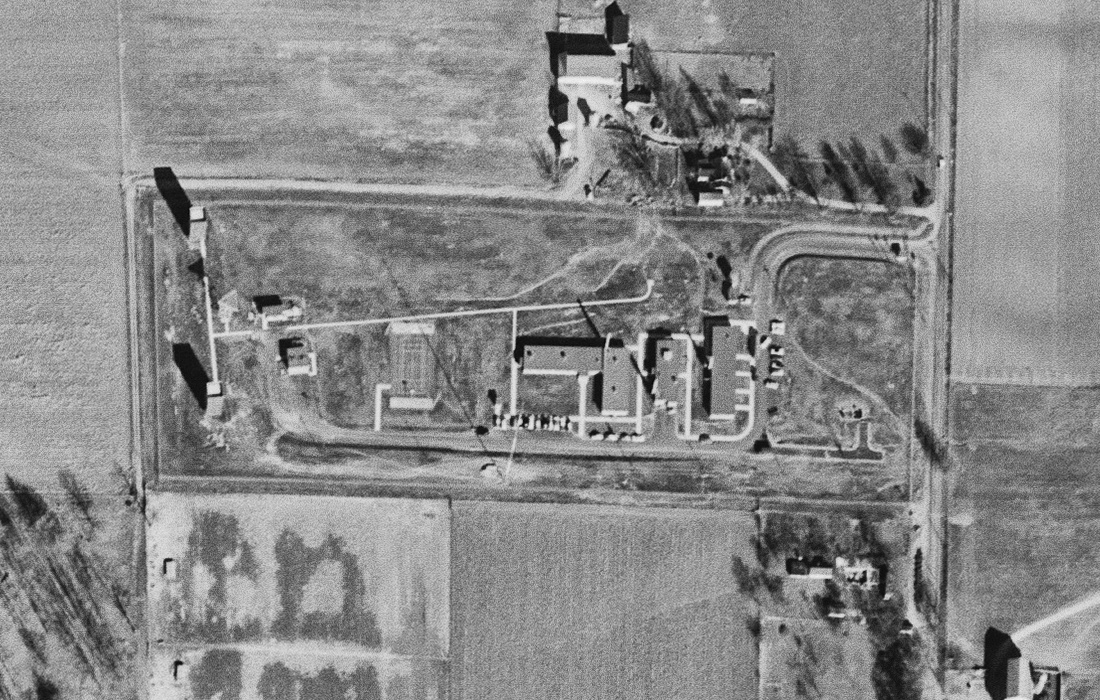
CD-78 Control area in 1959

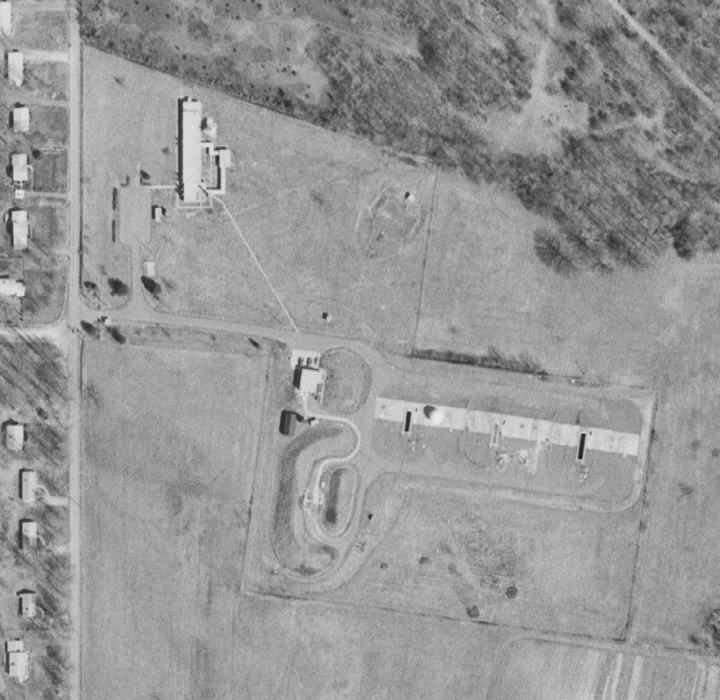
W-83 Launch area in 1973

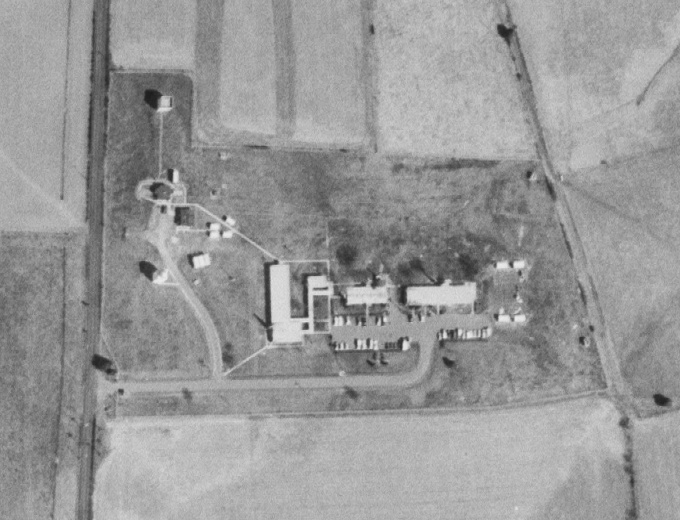
W-83 Control area in 1973

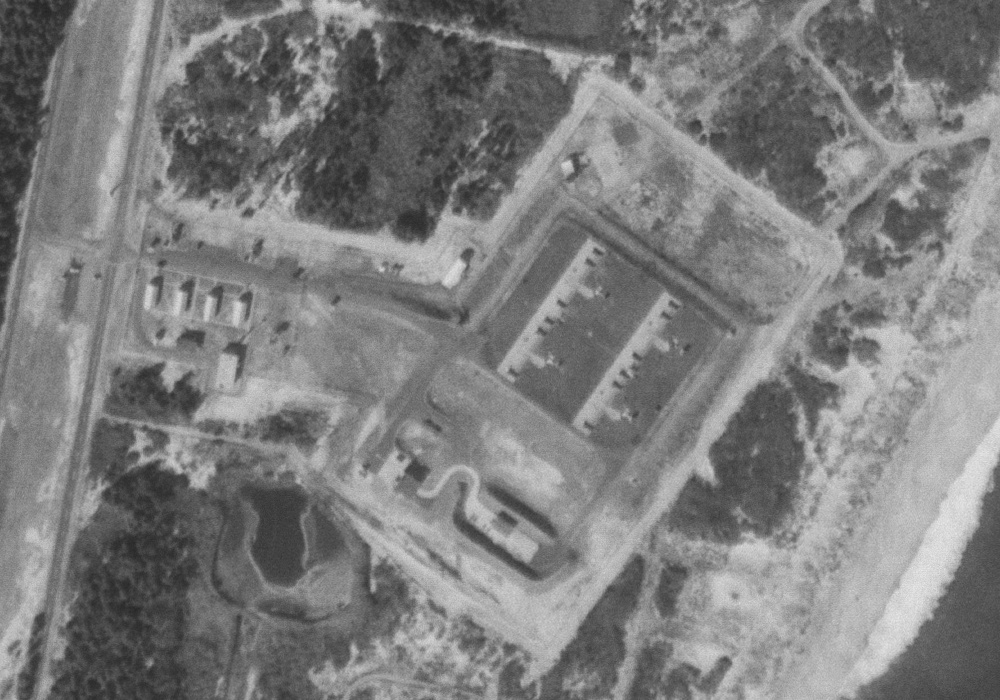
NY-56 Launch area in 1969

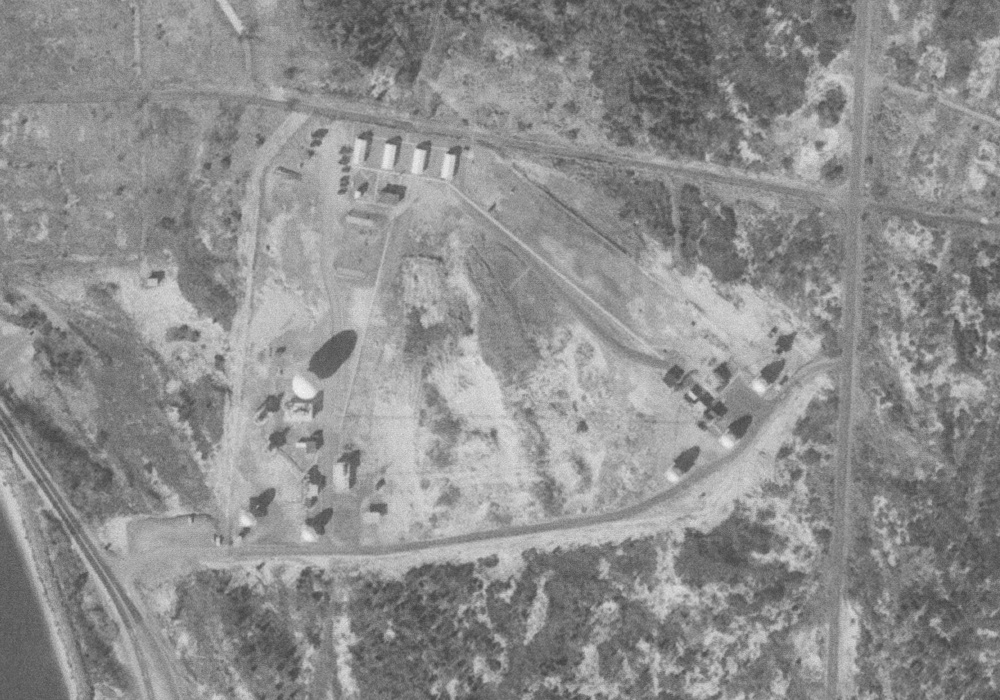
NY-56 Control area in 1969

== See also ==
- Project Nike topics
- U.S. Army Nike sites
