= Paus collection =

The Paus collection (Norwegian: Paus-samlingen) is a collection of classical sculpture that mostly forms part of the National Museum of Norway, and previously of its predecessor, the National Gallery. The collection was created in the late 19th and early 20th centuries by papal chamberlain and count Christopher Tostrup Paus, who lived in Rome at the time; it was moved to his Swedish estate Trystorp during the First World War and later partly to his estate Herresta. At the time it was mostly possible to export antique objects from Italy. Previously the largest private collection of classical sculpture in the Nordic countries, it was largely donated to the Norwegian government by Paus between 1918 and 1929 as the intended foundation of a Norwegian museum or department of classical sculpture. Some objects from the Paus collection were also acquired by other museums, including Ny Carlsberg Glyptotek.

== History ==
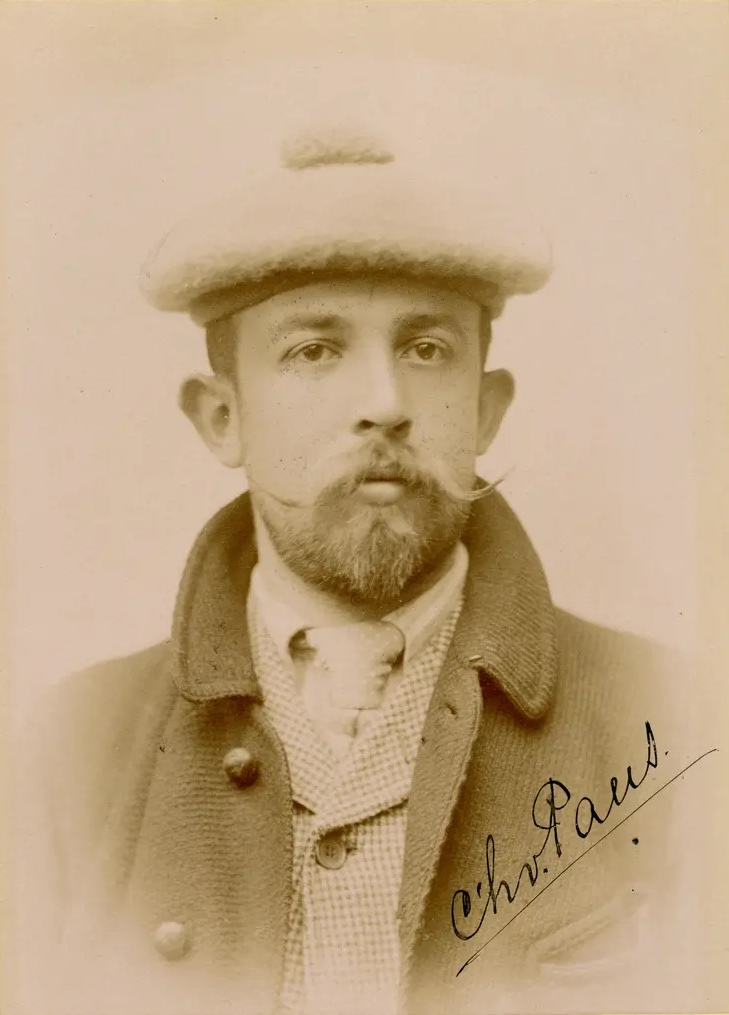
Count Christopher Paus, who created the collection when living in Rome

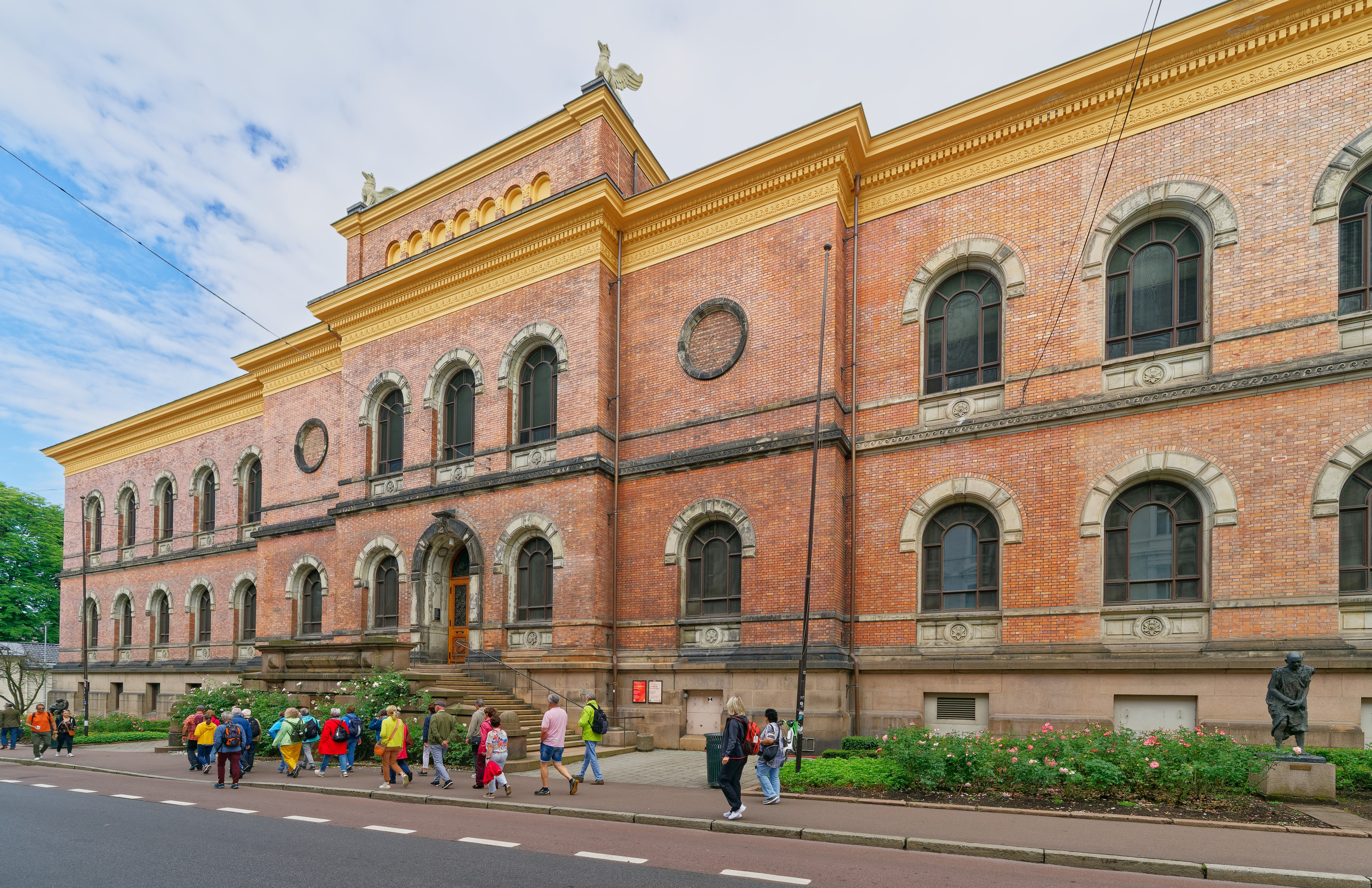
The National Gallery, where the collection was on display 1918–2019

The collection was created by Christopher Tostrup Paus (1862–1943) in the late 19th and early 20th centuries, and was the largest private collection of classical sculpture in the Nordic countries at the time. Paus was heir to one of Norway's largest timber companies (Tostrup & Mathiesen) and was a papal chamberlain and count, who lived for several years in Rome, where he acquired the collection with the assistance of several Scandinavian art historians. In the late 19th century, as Italy transitioned from feudalism to a modern economy, Rome's rapid urban expansion and construction uncovered numerous antiques. Concurrently, long-established noble families, now facing financial hardship in this changing society, were compelled to sell their historic collections of these objects. It was also relatively easy to export antique objects from Italy. This situation made it possible for wealthy foreign art collectors – such as Paus and Carl Jacobsen, founder of Ny Carlsberg Glyptotek – to build extensive collections. During the First World War Paus moved his collection to his Swedish estate Trystorp and it was later partly moved to his estate Herresta. Most of the collection was donated by Paus to the National Gallery between 1918 and 1929. It was intended as the foundation of a Norwegian museum or department of classical sculpture, as Paus wrote in a letter to the government in 1918, and formed the core of the National Gallery's classical sculpture collection. Prior to Paus' decision to donate most of the collection to the National Gallery, Ny Carlsberg Glyptotek had attempted to acquire it.

Archaeologist Siri Sande notes that

Since [Paus] was a papal chamberlain in Rome, it is commonly believed that the sculptures in his collection were purchased there. The Paus collection was donated to the then National Gallery between 1918 and 1929. In the early 20th century, one could freely buy and export antique objects from Italy as long as they were not of great national value, and therefore, there was a good availability of Roman sculptures in the art market. Hence, it is reasonable to assume that Chr. Paus frequented antiquity dealers in Rome to build up his collection, which mainly consisted of portraits.

— Siri Sande

The bust of Trajan was given to the National Gallery in 1923 and was the first original Roman imperial portrait in Norwegian ownership. Samson Eitrem wrote that "it excellently complements the other portraits of the Paus collection, busts which for the most part belong to the earliest imperial period."

The collection was on display in the first floor of the old National Gallery building from 1918 to 2019, before the National Gallery moved to the newly completed National Museum building in 2022. Several of the works are from 2022 on display in Room 1 in the new National Museum. Paus was appointed as a Knight First Class of the Order of St. Olav for services to art museums in 1919 and was later promoted to Commander.

Some objects from the Paus collection were also acquired by other museums, including Ny Carlsberg Glyptotek.

== Works ==
The collection includes at least 60 sculptures mainly from Ancient Rome and some from Ancient Greece, especially Roman works from the period 100 BC to 200 AD, but also some older works from the first millennium BC. It includes busts of emperors such as Galba, Trajan, Lucius Verus, and (probably) Commodus, empress Julia Domna, Ptolemy of Mauretania, and numerous Roman women. Samson Eitrem wrote a review of the collection in 1919 and a comprehensive catalogue in 1927. Several of the works have been described as being of very high quality and characteristic of their era.

The following is a partial list:

Image	Name	Subject	Era	Details	Provenance
	Paus Trajan (Portrait of Trajan after Decennalia type)	Trajan	103–117 AD	Fine crystalline white marble, height 32.7 cm. Reworked ca. 103–17 AD from an older portrait, possibly a portrait of Domitian (81–96 AD)	Donated by Christopher Paus to the National Gallery in 1923
	Portrait of a woman		50 BC	White-yellow coarse-grained limestone, height 18.7 cm.	Donated by Christopher Paus to the National Gallery in 1918
	Paus Galba	Galba	1st century		Donated by Christopher Paus to the National Gallery in 1918
	Paus Julia Domna (Portrait of Julia Domna, Fesch type)	Julia Domna	Ca. 193–211 AD		Donated by Christopher Paus to the National Gallery in 1918
		Probably Commodus	180–192 AD		Donated by Christopher Paus to the National Gallery in 1918
	Paus Lucius Verus	Lucius Verus	2nd century		Donated by Christopher Paus to the National Gallery in 1918
	Paus Ptolemy	Ptolemy of Mauretania	1st century		Donated by Christopher Paus to the National Gallery in 1918
	Portrait of a woman with wreath		40–45 AD	Macrocrystalline white marble, height 21.8 cm	Donated by Christopher Paus to the National Gallery in 1918
	Portrait of a man		Ca. 50 BC	Macrocrystalline white marble, height 31.5 cm	Donated by Christopher Paus to the National Gallery in 1918
	Female head with wreath		Ca. 130–160 AD	Fine crystalline white marble, height 19.8 cm	Donated by Christopher Paus to the National Gallery in 1918
	Portrait of a man		Ca. 50–75 AD	Fine crystalline white marble, height 28.8 cm	Donated by Christopher Paus to the National Gallery in 1918
	Female head from relief		Ca. 150–200 AD	Fine crystalline white marble, height 21 cm	Donated by Christopher Paus to the National Gallery in 1927
	Portrait of a girl		Ca. 65–75 AD	Fine crystalline white marble, height 26.5 cm	Donated by Christopher Paus to the National Gallery in 1918
	Boy with Phrygian cap		69–138 AD	Fine crystalline marble, height 13.3 cm	Donated by Christopher Paus to the National Gallery in 1918
	Portrait of a woman		120–130 AD	Macrocrystalline white marble, height 24.7 cm	Donated by Christopher Paus to the National Gallery in 1918
	Head of Isis		30 BC–70 AD	Macrocrystalline white marble, height 23.8 cm	Donated by Christopher Paus to the National Gallery in 1918
	Herm bust of Apollo		1st century AD	Macrocrystalline white marble, height 34.5 cm	Donated by Christopher Paus to the National Gallery in 1918
