= Karl L. Paus =

Norwegian businessman (1856–1953)

Karl Ludvig Paus
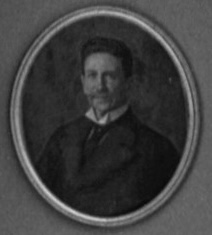
- Portrait of Paus at Herresta
- Born: October 29, 1856; Norway
- Died: February 22, 1953 (aged 96)
- Burial place: Cemetery of Our Saviour
- Occupations: Industrialist and engineer
- Known for: Co-founder and co-owner of Den Norske Hesteskosømfabrik
- Spouse: Elise Schaft Gjør
- Children: 4
- Father: Christopher Blom Paus

Karl Ludvig Paus (October 29, 1856 – February 22, 1953) was a Norwegian industrialist and engineer. He was a co-founder and co-owner of Den Norske Hesteskosømfabrik, one of the larger industrial companies in Christiania, located next to Akerselva and Hjula Væverier (owned by relatives).

The only remaining building of the factory is a museum, known as Hønse-Lovisa's house after a novel by Oskar Braaten. He was a first cousin of playwright Henrik Ibsen and a source for many stories about Ibsen's background and family, cited by Oskar Mosfjeld and later Ibsen biographers.

== Early life ==
He grew up in Skien and was the son of shipowner and bank director Christopher Blom Paus and Danish-born Mine Ernst; his father started his business career working for his older brother Knud Ibsen when Knud established himself as a timber merchant in Skien in 1825. Karl L. Paus lived in Skien until 1876 and then studied engineering at the Royal Technical College in Hanover from 1876 to 1880.

== Career ==
In 1881, he established Den Norske Hesteskosømfabrik with his brothers Ole and Christian Paus, which became one of the larger industrial companies in Christiania.

In 1885, the company purchased the former Foss Spinderi (Foss Spinning Mill) from Thorvald Meyer and co-owners and had factory facilities at Thorvald Meyers gate 1 by the Akerselva; "Hønse-Lovisa's house" (Sandakerveien 2) was also part of the factory complex and is its only remaining building. The company was a member of the Akerselvens Brugseierforening.

In 1883, the company opened a branch in London and built a factory in Hamburg. He was the technical director of the company for 37 years, in addition to being a co-owner. By 1889, the company had 158 employees in Christiania. In 1916, the company was transformed into a joint-stock company with a capital of one million kroner; the company announced plans to expand and build an electric steel smelting plant. In 1917, Karl L. Paus and his nephew Thorleif Paus were board members of the Christiania Steelworks.

Karl L. Paus stepped down from the leadership of the company in 1918. The company changed its name to A/S Den norske Hesteskofabrik in 1925; in 1926, the business and machinery were sold to the Sarpsborg company De forenede norske hesteskofabrikker, and the properties by Akerselva were repurposed.

== Personal life ==
He was married to Elise Schaft Gjør (b. 1868), daughter of the noted physician Herman Gjør and Valborg Tostrup, and granddaughter of timber magnate Christopher Tostrup. They were the parents of skier and landowner Herman Paus (1897–1983) of Herresta Manor, factory owner Eyvind Paus (b. 1900), landowner Karl Paus (b. 1902) of Närsjö Manor, and Walborg Elise Paus (b. 1907). His daughter-in-law, Countess Tatiana Tolstoy, was the last surviving grandchild of the Russian novelist Leo Tolstoy.

He took over the Fredensborg estate on Bygdøy from his father-in-law in 1907. He was an avid hunter and lived for several years later in life on one of his son's estates in Sweden, which had extensive hunting grounds. He also had a property in Vestre Slidre, where he hunted with people like Ivar Fosheim. The family's house on Bygdøy was seized for use as a guard barracks by Quisling during World War II. After the war, he settled at Høn in Asker. He is interred at the Cemetery of Our Saviour in the same grave as his father.
