= Paus Trajan =

Bust of Antinous

Bust of Trajan
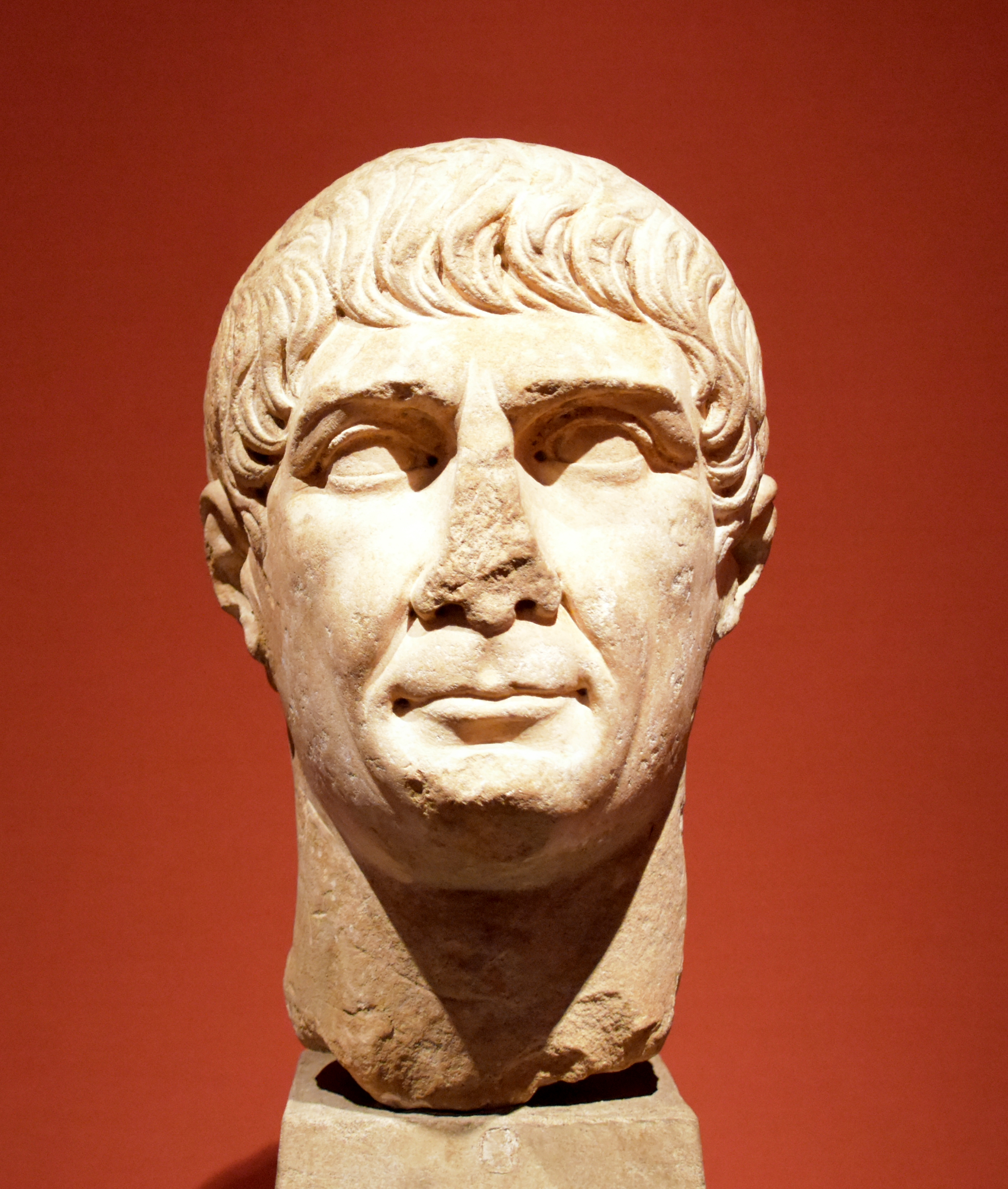
- The bust in 2017
- Subject: Trajan
- Location: National Museum of Art, Architecture and Design; Oslo, Norway

The Paus Trajan is a marble portrait head of the Roman emperor Trajan, who ruled from 98 to 117 AD. It is part of the Paus collection of the National Museum of Art, Architecture and Design in Oslo, Norway. The Paus collection, the largest private collection of ancient Roman art in Northern Europe, was donated by papal chamberlain, art collector and count Christopher Tostrup Paus to the National Gallery from 1918.

== History ==
It is made of fine crystalline white marble, and has a height 32.7 cm. It was reworked during Trajan's reign from an older portrait, possibly a portrait of Domitian (81–96 AD), and is a Decennalia type portrait of Trajan, one of around fifty surviving busts of him and one of several Decennalia portraits of him.

The bust was acquired by Christopher Tostrup Paus who amassed the largest private collection of ancient Roman art in Northern Europe. Paus spent several years in Rome where he was appointed a papal chamberlain and count. From 1918 he donated large parts of the collection to the National Gallery, with additional donations in the following years, including the Trajan portrait in 1923. It was the first original Roman imperial portrait in Norwegian ownership. Samson Eitrem wrote that "it excellently complements the other portraits of the Paus collection, busts which for the most part belong to the earliest imperial period."

From 1923 to 2019 the portrait was on display on the first floor of the old National Gallery building, until being moved to the new National Museum building that opened in 2022. Samson Eitrem published a catalogue of the Paus collection and other ancient sculptures with a detailed description of the bust in 1927.
