= Tatiana Tolstoy-Paus =

Russian-Swedish socialite and Tolstoy

Countess Tatiana Tolstoy-Paus
- Born: Tatyana Tolstaya; 20 September 1914; Yasnaya Polyana, Russian Empire
- Died: 29 January 2007 (aged 92); Herresta, Sweden
- Spouse: Herman Paus
- Father: Lev Lvovich Tolstoy

Tatiana "Tanja" Tolstoy-Paus (Note: The spelling Tatiana Tolstoy was her official name in Sweden, although Tolstoy is a masculine form of the name in the original Russian; the feminine form is Tolstaya) (born Countess Tatyana Lvovna Tolstaya, Russian: Графиня Татья́на Льво́вна Толста́я; 20 September 1914 – 29 January 2007) was a Russian-Swedish countess, socialite and a member of the Tolstoy family. She was the last surviving grandchild of Leo Tolstoy.

She was born on her grandfather's estate Yasnaya Polyana, the daughter of novelist and sculptor Lev Lvovich Tolstoy and his Swedish wife Dora Westerlund. As a result of the Russian Revolution, the family fled to Sweden in 1917. In 1940 she married Norwegian-born estate owner and former competitive skier Herman Paus, the owner of the major Herresta estate outside Stockholm. Her father-in-law Karl L. Paus was a first cousin of playwright Henrik Ibsen. They had four children. She was active in regional politics and as a philanthropist and socialite in Swedish society.

Her great-niece is jazz singer Viktoria Tolstoy.
