= Herman Paus =

Norwegian competitive skier

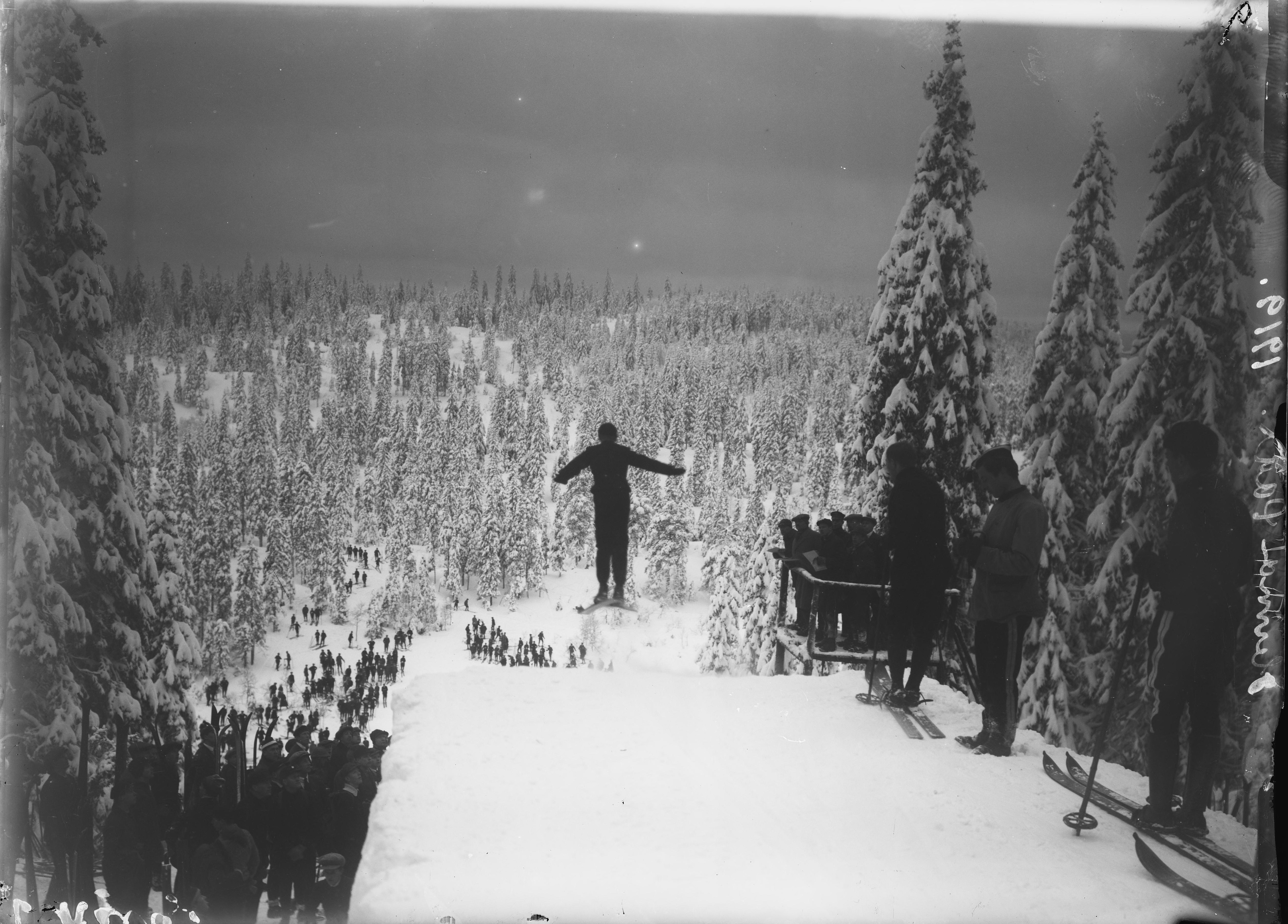
- Herman Paus, 1919
- Born: 4 May 1897; Bygdøy, Norway
- Died: 11 March 1983 (aged 85); Herresta, Sweden
- Spouse: Countess Tatiana Tolstoy

Herman Christopher Paus (4 May 1897 – 11 March 1983) was a Norwegian competitive skier, who was among the pioneers of Nordic combined and ski jumping in the 1910s and 1920s. He later moved to Sweden where he bought the major estate Herresta near Stockholm from a relative. A relative of playwright Henrik Ibsen, Herman Paus was married to Leo Tolstoy's granddaughter Tatiana Tolstoy-Paus; as such he was the son-in-law of Count Lev Lvovich Tolstoy.

== Career ==
He grew up at Bygdøy near Oslo; his father Karl L. Paus was an engineer and steel industrialist, and a first cousin of playwright Henrik Ibsen. Since the late 1910s Herman Paus was active in competitive skiing in Norway as a member of SFK Lyn; he participated in numerous national and international competitions. He received the Lyn honorary award in 1926, along with then-Crown Prince Olav. In the 1920s he was active in Swedish competitive skiing as a member of Djurgårdens IF. Norwegian newspapers mentioned his skiing career over 400 times between 1916 and the late 1920s.

Herman Paus was educated as an agronomist at Vinterlandbruksskolen in Christiania, then at Pederstrup in Denmark and Valinge manor in Sweden. In 1923 he became manager of the Herresta estate, owned by his relative, papal chamberlain and count Christopher Tostrup Paus, who spent most of his time in Rome. They were paternal second cousins, but Christopher Tostrup Paus was also his mother's first cousin; both were descended from wealthy timber merchant Christopher Tostrup. In 1938 Christopher Tostrup Paus sold Herresta to Herman Paus. Herman and Christopher Tostrup Paus donated various portraits to the Ibsen Museum, including a portrait of Ibsen's sister Hedvig Ibsen.

In early 1940 the engagement between Herman Paus and Countess Tatiana Tolstoy was announced; a member of the Tolstoy family, Tatiana was the last surviving grandchild of Leo Tolstoy. She was born on her grandfather's estate Yasnaya Polyana—where he wrote both War and Peace and Anna Karenina—but moved to Sweden in 1917. Herman and Tatiana Paus had four children, and their descendants own the Herresta and Näsbyholm estates in Södermanland; their daughter Tatiana Paus is known as one of the personal friends of the King and Queen of Sweden. Herman Paus' brother Karl Paus owned Närsjö manor in nearby Eskilstuna.

A Norwegian skier born in 2000 using the name Herman Paus (né Kristiansen) is unrelated to both him and to the Paus family.
