= Magleås =

Coordinates: 55.8538°N 12.4682°E

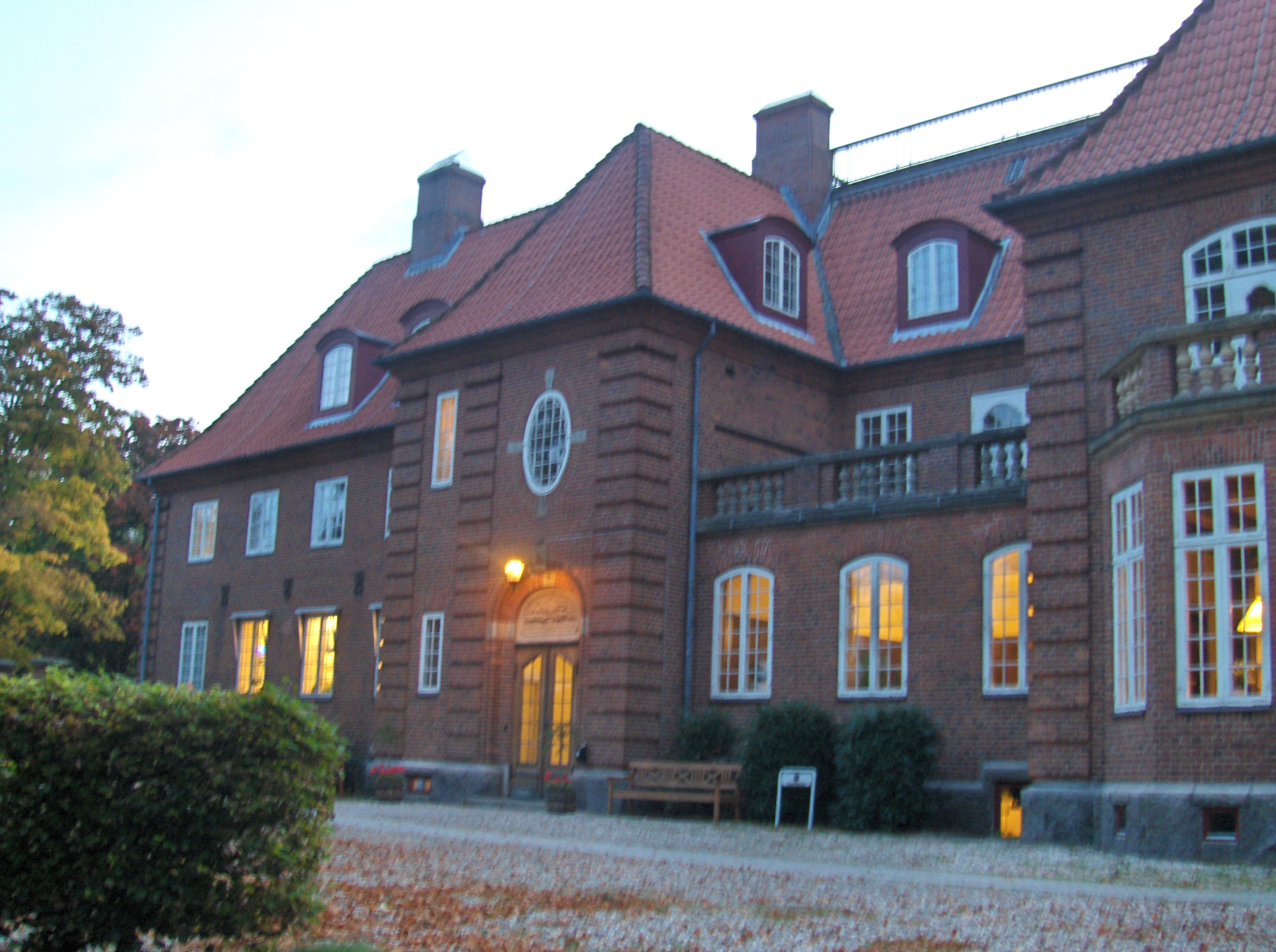

General information
- Architectural style: Neo-baroque
- Town or city: Høsterkøb
- Country: Denmark
- Year(s) built: 1910

Design and construction
- Architect(s): Torben Grut

Magleås is a mansion in Høsterkøb near Birkerød in northern Zealand, Denmark. It is located in Rudersdal Municipality in the Capital Region of Denmark, 25 km. outside Copenhagen. The mansion includes 8 hectare park, and borders on the Rude Forest (Rude Skov). It also includes stables and a caretaker's house.

It was built in 1910 for businessman Aage Westenholz (1859–1935), an uncle of Karen Blixen who was a co-owner and chairman of the board of her coffee farm (Karen Coffee Company Ltd.). He had previously made a fortune as a businessman in Asia. The main building, with its 50 rooms, was designed by the Westenholz' brother-in-law, the architect Torben Grut, in a neo-baroque style. In 1910, the Westenholz family moved in with a large staff. The nearby mansion Aasebakken was also designed by Torben Grut and built for land-owner Lennart Grut.

== History ==
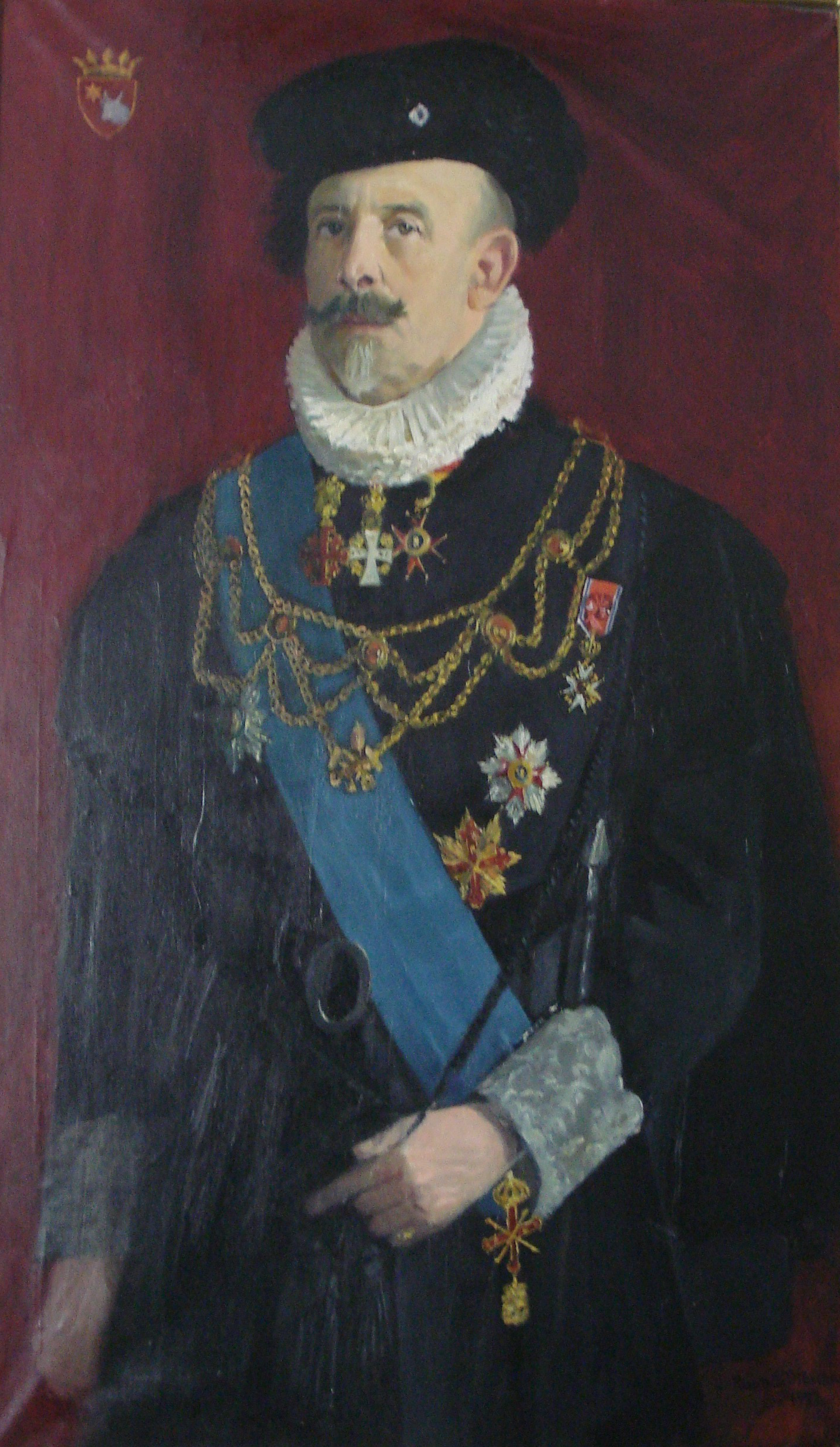
Papal chamberlain and count Christopher de Paus

In 1942, Magleås was bought by papal chamberlain and count Christopher de Paus, who had sold his estate Herresta in Sweden in 1938 to a relative and who died in 1943. Magleås was inherited by Thorleif Paus, who sold the property in 1945 to the Catholic Church in Denmark. For some years, it was used as a college, but today it serves as a conference hotel as well as representative purposes for the Catholic Church in Denmark. Since 1942, nearby Aasebakken has served as a Catholic monastery, named Vor Frue Kloster.

== Literature ==
- Ingelise Schmidt og Tormod Hessel: Magleås og Åsebakken. Mennesker og begivenheder. Birkerød, Birkerød Lokalhistoriske Forening, 2012, 131 s., ISBN 978-87-87087-03-2.
- Niels Peter Johansen, «Livet på Magleås og Åsebakken», i Birkerød Lokalhistorie, vol. 3, nr. 4, 1992, s. 3–5
- Tormod Hessel, «Magleås og Åsebakken : fra patricierejendomme til højskole og kloster», i Birkerød Lokalhistorie, vol. 3, nr. 4, 1992, s. 6–7
