= Frances Morris (curator) =

British curator

Frances Morris CBE
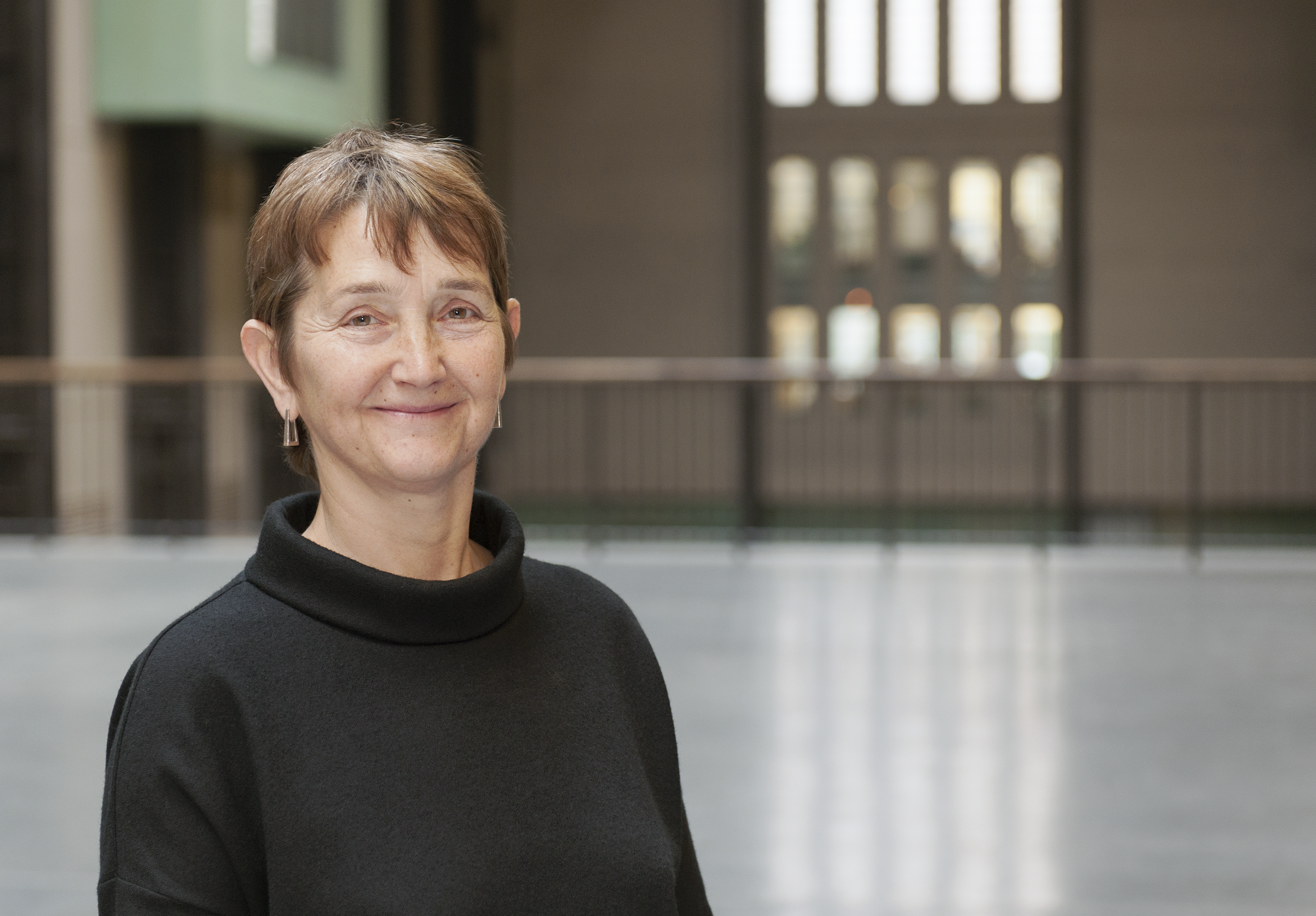
- Morris in 2018
- Born: January 1959 (age 67); London, England
- Education: King's College, Cambridge; Courtauld Institute of Art
- Title: Director Emerita, Tate Modern
- Predecessor: Chris Dercon
- Successor: Karin Hindsbo
- Spouse: Martin Caiger-Smith
- Children: 3

Frances Mary Morris CBE (born January 1959) is an English art curator who served as the director of the Tate Modern from January 2016 to February 2023. She had succeeded Chris Dercon, and is succeeded by Karin Hindsbo. She remains the director emerita.

== Education ==
Frances Morris was born in London. She attended a state school, Haberdashers' Aske's School for Girls, at the time a direct grant grammar, in New Cross, London. At University, she studied history of art, receiving a bachelor's degree from King's College, Cambridge, in 1978. She later went on to gain a master's degree from the Courtauld Institute of Art. Her master's thesis deals with French painter Jean Hélion.

== Career ==
After working at the Arnolfini Gallery in Bristol, Morris joined the Tate Gallery as a curator in the Modern Collection in 1987, became Head of Displays at Tate Modern when it opened in 2000, and Director of Collections (International Art) in 2006. In January 2016, she was appointed director of the Tate Modern. As Director, Morris oversees one of the world's most popular art museums, with an attendance of over 5.8 million visitors annually; she is also credited with elevating Tate Modern's profile globally. She is the gallery's first British and first woman director.

Morris, along with her colleague Iwona Blazwick, was responsible with the initial presentation in 2000 of the Tate Modern's opening collection displays, organised thematically and in a non-chronological manner with mixing of contemporary artworks with those of Monet, Matisse, and Picasso. While the non-chronological style was controversial with art critics, it is now regularly used world-wide by museums and galleries; Tate Modern continues to display its collection in this way.

In her career, Morris has particularly focused on the work of women artists, and worked to extend the canon of art history to include work from outside Europe; since 2006 she has spearheaded Tate's global acquisitions strategy. She has curated several large-scale international collaborative exhibitions including, most recently, major retrospectives for Louise Bourgeois in 2007, Yayoi Kusama in 2012, Agnes Martin in 2015, and Alberto Giacometti in 2017.

In 2018, Morris was part of the selection committee that nominated Ruangrupa as artistic director of Documenta fifteen.

== Other activities ==
- Conseil International des Musees d'Art Moderne (CIMAM), Member of the Advisory Committee
- Fruitmarket Gallery, Member of the Board of Directors
- Mori Art Museum, Member of the Advisory Board
- Serralves Museum, Member of the Advisory Board
- MNAC Bucharest, Member of the Scientific Board

== Recognition ==
Morris was appointed Commander of the Order of the British Empire (CBE) in the 2023 New Year Honours for services to the arts. She also holds Honorary Doctorates from the Universities of Essex, Edinburgh and York, from the Royal College of Art London and UAL.

== Personal life ==
Morris is married to Martin Caiger-Smith, Head of the MA Curating the Art Museum programme at the Courtauld Institute of Art. They have three children.
