= Johan Altenborg Paus =

Norwegian artillery officer and war commissioner (1834–1894)

Johan Altenborg Paus (December 3, 1834 – April 16, 1894) was a Norwegian artillery officer who served as war commissioner. Prior to this he served as head of the Artillery Officers' School from 1868 to 1871 and inspector for the Main Line and Kongsvinger Line until 1874. He was also a lecturer at the Norwegian Military Academy, served on several government-appointed committees on military issues, was an active freemason, served on the boards of Christiania Military Society and the Norwegian Association of Hunters and Anglers. A member of the Paus family, he was a first cousin of the playwright Henrik Ibsen and the son of the lawyer Henrik Johan Paus. He was named for his father's foster father and uncle, Johan Altenburg, Henrik Ibsen's maternal grandfather. Henrik Ibsen shared the names Henrik Johan with his father. Johan Altenborg Paus was the son-in-law of the timber magnate Christopher Tostrup and the father of the papal chamberlain, art collector and philanthropist, Count Christopher Paus. He was a Knight of the Order of Vasa and there is a painting of him by Nils Gude (1886). Upon his death, he was described as "a personality much loved by comrades, superiors, and subordinates." He is interred at the Cemetery of Our Saviour in Oslo.

== Honours ==
- Knight of the Order of Vasa
