= Johan Georg Lillienberg =

Swedish count and politician

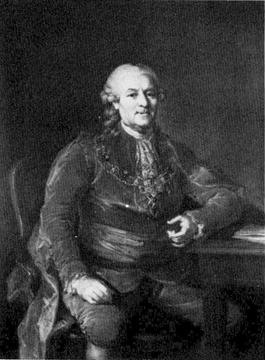
Johan Georg Lillienberg.

Johan Georg Lillienberg (1713 – 1798) was a Swedish count and politician who was appointed as Lawspeaker of Gotland in 1746. In 1749, he became Governor of Åbo and Björneborg County, and in 1757 Governor of Uppsala County. Lillienberg was made a baron in 1766 and a count in 1778.

In 1768, Lillienberg was elected a member of the Royal Swedish Academy of Sciences.

He died at his manor Herresta in Södermanland.
