= Valdemar Glückstadt =

Danish businessman and Consul-General

Valdemar Josef Glückstadt (25 February 1868 in Christiania – 11 November 1942) was a Danish businessman and Consul-General.

He was the son of prominent banker Isak Glückstadt and Juliette Sophie Raffel, and belonged to a prominent Jewish family from Denmark. His brother was Emil Glückstadt.

He was a Knight of the Order of the Dannebrog, and the Consul-General of Italy to Denmark.

He was married to Julie Emilie Rée (born 1875, died 1952), daughter of Edvard Rée. Their daughter Ella Glückstadt (b. 1899) was married in 1920 to Count Erik Moltke of Nør (died 1922) and secondly to Thorleif Paus.

== Literature ==
- Kraks Blaa Bog 1910
