= Thorleif Paus =

Norwegian diplomat, estate owner and businessman

- Born: October 8, 1881
- Died: June 9, 1976 (aged 94)
- Occupations: Army officer, consul-general, businessman, estate owner

Thorleif Paus (pronounced [ˈtʊ̀lːæɪf ˈpæʉs]; 8 October 1881 – 9 June 1976), also known as Thorleif de Paus or Thorleif von Paus, was a Norwegian diplomat, estate owner and businessman. As a 23 year old consular secretary he became Norway's only diplomatic representative to the great power of Austria-Hungary in 1905 and in charge of obtaining diplomatic recognition of Norway following the dissolution of the union between Norway and Sweden; he later served as consul and acting consul-general in Vienna. Paus left Austria-Hungary in 1918 and later became a businessman in Norway, an estate owner in Sweden, where he owned Kvesarum Castle, and finally moved to Copenhagen.

== Background and family ==
A member of the Paus family, he was a son of the steel industrialist and banker Ole Paus and Birgitte Halvordine Schou, and grew up in Christiania (now Oslo). His father was a first cousin of Henrik Ibsen, whereas his mother was a first cousin of the industrialist Halvor Schou. Prime Minister Sigurd Ibsen was Thorleif Paus' second cousin. He was the brother of the businessman Christopher Blom Paus (1878–1959) and the brother-in-law of the historian of nobility Otto von Munthe af Morgenstierne. His nephew was the steel industrialist Per Paus, who was married to Hedevig Wedel-Jarlsberg.

In his first marriage, he was married to Gabriele (Ella) Stein (1883–1971), the daughter of the Viennese lawyer August Stein (1852–1890). August Stein left the Jewish Community of Vienna in 1877 and he and his children were baptized as Catholics in 1885/86. In his second marriage, he was married to the former countess Ella Moltke, née Glückstadt (born 1899 in Copenhagen), a daughter of the prominent Danish Jewish businessman Valdemar Glückstadt and widow of count Erik Moltke of Nør. In his first marriage, he was the father of Helvig Paus (born 1909 in Vienna) and Major-General Ole Paus (born 1910 in Vienna). In his second marriage, he had a stepson, count Erik Moltke. He was the grandfather of the troubadour Ole Paus and the great-grandfather of the composer Marcus Paus.

== Career ==
He graduated from the Norwegian Military Academy and became a second lieutenant in the cavalry in 1902; he was promoted to first lieutenant in 1909. From 1902 he served as a consular secretary (deputy head of mission) at the Swedish-Norwegian consulate general in Vienna. The industrialist Carl Neufeldt was honorary consul-general, but usually absent, and in practice the consulate-general was led by Paus.

Following the dissolution of the union between Norway and Sweden the consulate-general in practice became the Norwegian diplomatic mission to Austria-Hungary, and Paus was tasked with obtaining diplomatic recognition of Norway as Norway's only representative in the country. At the time Paus was 23 years old and officially employed as a consular secretary. The Austrian newspaper Die Zeit noted that "Lieutenant Thorleif v. Paus manages the consulate's business. Rarely has a young diplomat found himself in such a responsible position as Mr. v. Paus, who will in a short time have to obtain recognition of his country from the Vienna government." The newspaper expected him to become head of a new legation, but Norway chose to appoint Thor von Ditten as minister to Berlin with secondary accreditations to multiple countries including Italy and Austria-Hungary from 1906. Paus later served as commercial attaché and from 1910 to 1917 formally as vice consul and oftentimes acting consul-general. As such he was the highest-ranking representative of Norway residing in Austria-Hungary.

From 1906 to 1918, Paus operated his own business as an agent in Vienna, representing large Norwegian industrial companies, mainly Norsk Hydro, in Austria-Hungary. As consul he became the only Scandinavian to witness the assassination of Archduke Franz Ferdinand of Austria in Sarajevo in 1914.

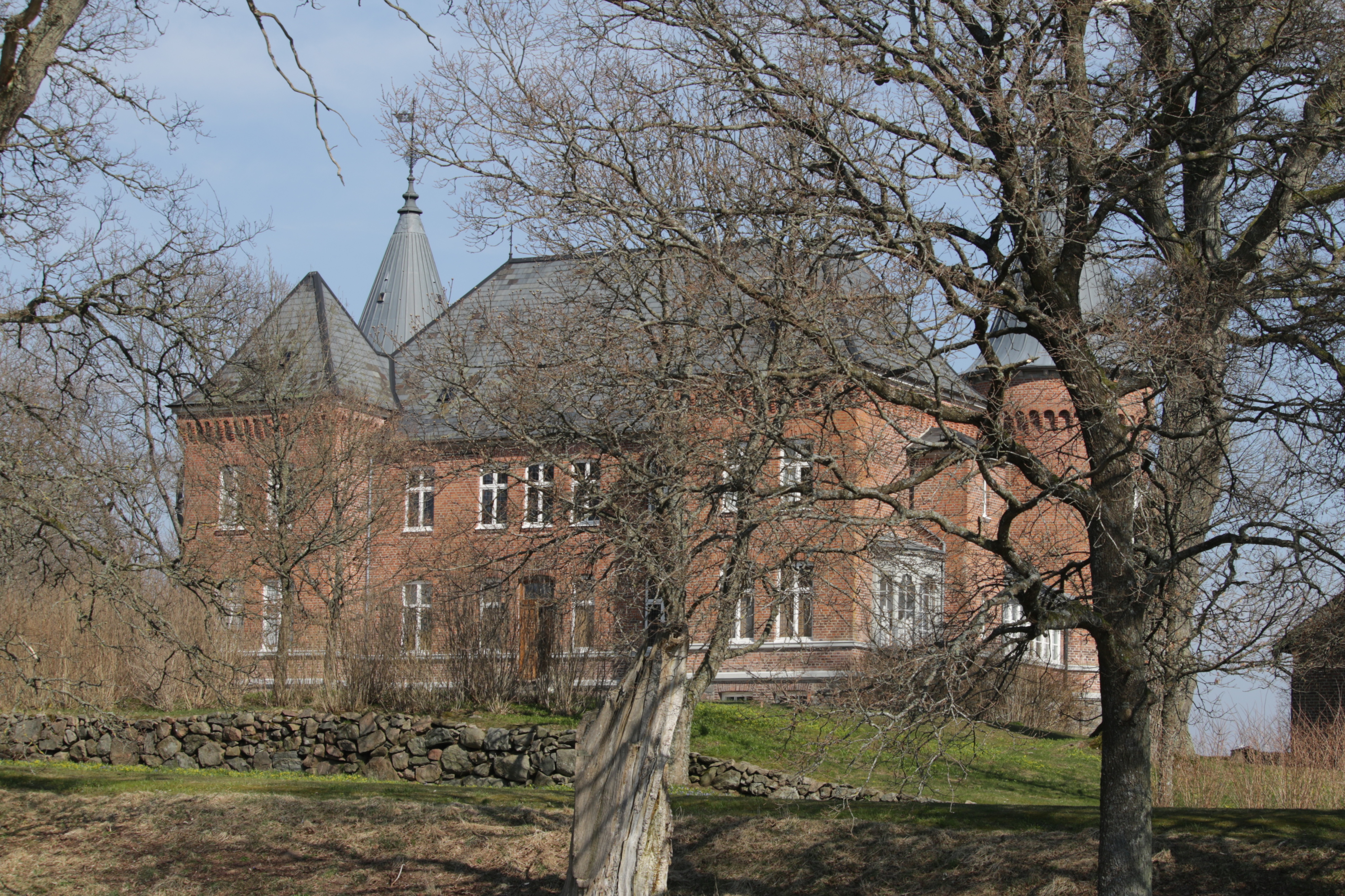
Kvesarum Castle

He returned to Norway in 1918 and continued his business as Thorleif Paus A/S in Oslo. He also became the owner of two factories in Ålesund. He lived in Scania, Sweden from 1935 to 1964, where he owned Kvesarum Castle from 1936 and the large estate Ejratal from 1948. He also inherited the manor house Magleås outside Copenhagen from his relative, count Christopher (de) Paus in 1943, but sold the property to the Catholic Church in Denmark a few years later. During the Second World War he received many Norwegian refugees at his castle Kvesarum, and there was built a Norwegian refugee camp near the castle. He moved to Copenhagen in 1964.

In Austria-Hungary, his name was usually and officially spelled Thorleif von Paus (commonly abbreviated to v. Paus). He also sometimes used the spelling Thorleif de Paus. The spelling von Paus was regarded as a rendering of the name in a German/Austro-Hungarian linguistic and cultural context, and not a native form of the name, which he continued to spell simply as Thorleif Paus within Scandinavia. In Austria-Hungary, he received the Order of the Iron Crown, one of the country's highest orders and which previously conferred automatic ennoblement.

== Honours ==
- Order of Saint John of Prussia
- Order of the Iron Crown of Austria
- Order of Franz Joseph of Austria
