= National Museum of Norway =

National Museum in Oslo

National Museum

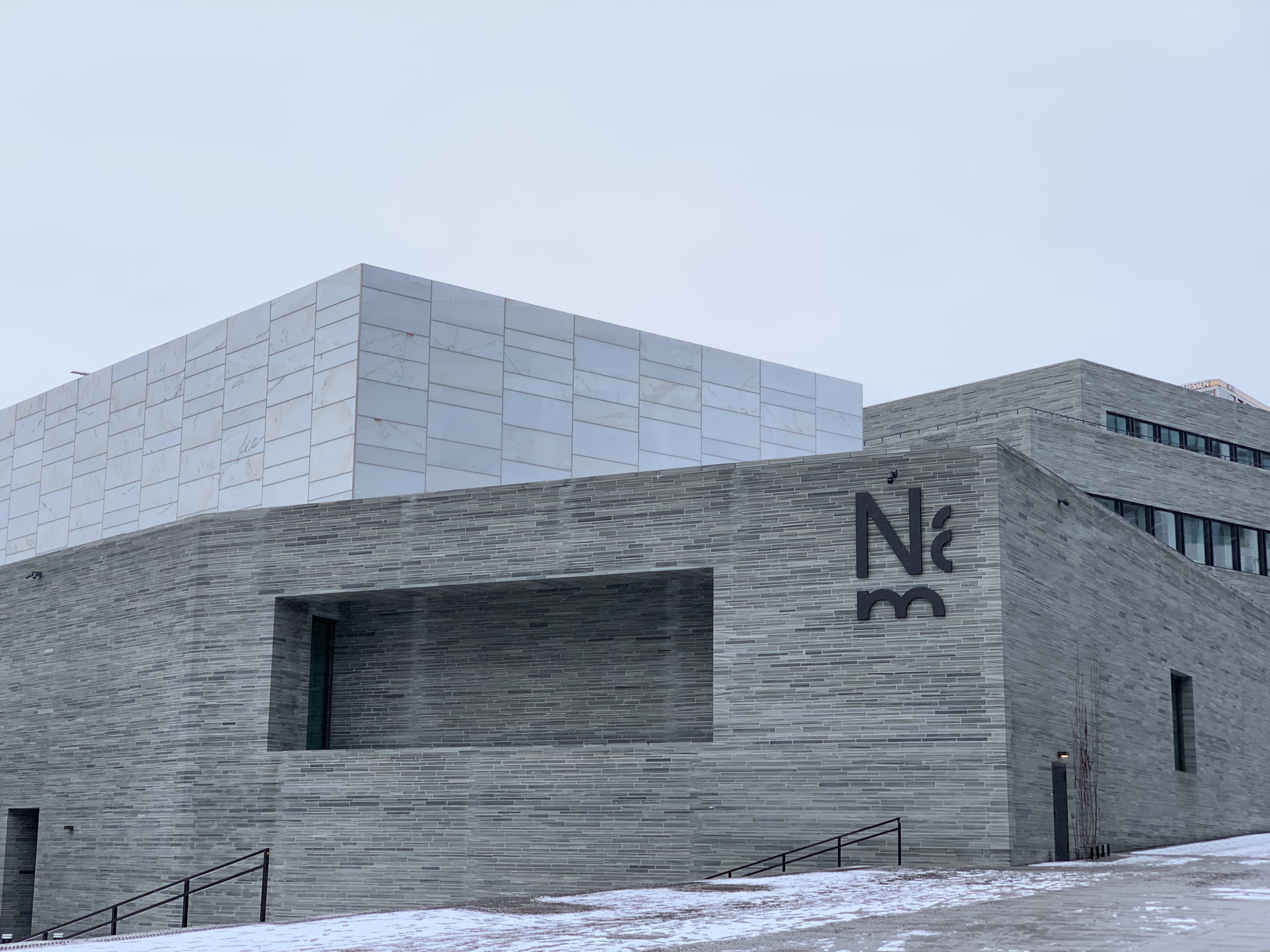
- Nye Nasjonalmuseet in Vika, Oslo, Norway
- Interactive fullscreen map
- Established: 28 April 2003
- Location: Vestbanehallen, Oslo
- Coordinates: 59°54′42″N 10°43′45″E
- Type: State-owned museum of art, architecture, and design
- Website: www.nasjonalmuseet.no

The National Museum (Norwegian: Nasjonalmuseet, officially the National Museum of Art, Architecture and Design (Note: Norwegian: Nasjonalmuseet for kunst, arkitektur og design)) is a museum in Oslo, Norway which holds the Norwegian state's public collection of art, architecture, and design objects. The collection totals over 400,000 works, amongst them the first copy of Edvard Munch's The Scream from 1893. The museum is state-owned and managed by the Norwegian Ministry of Culture.

The National Museum was established in 2003 by the merging of the Museum of Architecture, the Museum of Industrial Art, the Museum of Decorative Arts and Design, the Museum of Contemporary Art, and the National Gallery of Norway. In 2022, the museum opened its new building at Vestbanehallen at the centre of Oslo, housing the entirety of the collections from these previous museums.

The current director of the museum is Ingrid Røynesdal who was appointed in 2023.

== New building ==
A cohesive new building was a precondition for establishment of the National Museum in 2003, by which time the facilities housing the other museums destined to be consolidated there had all been determined to be too small.

Architecture competitions for expansion at Tullinløkka were previously held in 1972 and 1995 but were inconclusive.

In the spring of 2008 the government decided that the new building for the National Museum would be located at Vestbanen in place of the old Oslo West Station train station at Aker Brygge. It was originally planned to open in 2020. In November 2010 the German architecture company Kleihues + Schuwerk won the international architecture competition with the project Forum Artis.

In spring 2012 the pre-project was completed and delivered to the culture department. The government presented the project on 22 March 2013 with a price of approximately 5.3 billion Norwegian kroner. On 6 June 2013 the Stortinget decreed the new building to be within a cost frame of 5,327 billion kroner.

The National Gallery was closed temporarily from 13 January 2019 until the new National Museum opened. The gallery served as storage for the collections until its move to the new National Museum. The Museum for Contemporary Art was permanently closed on 3 September 2017, while the Art Industry Museum closed on 16 October 2016 .

The new museum building was constructed in Vestbanen, and opened in June 2022.

The building has been widely derided by critics, who have said it resembles a prison and described it as the "national prison."

== Collections of the National Museum ==
=== The National Gallery ===
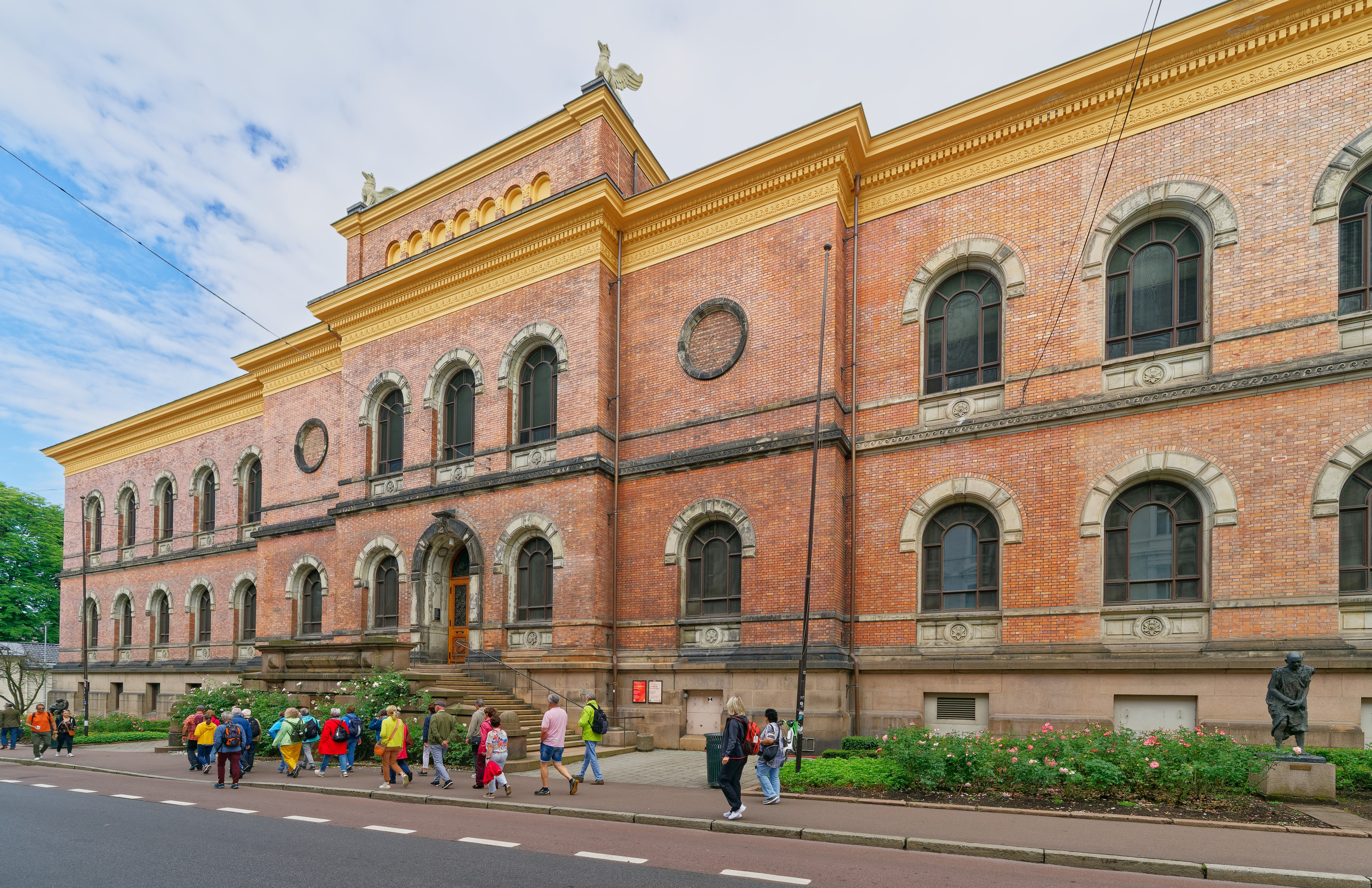
The old National Gallery building, completed in 1882

The National Gallery was established in 1842 as the Norwegian States Central Museum for Visual Arts. Since 1882 its location has been on Universitetsgata in Oslo, in a building designed by Heinrich Ernst and Adolf Schirmer. The building's exterior and interior was listed by Riksantikvaren (Cultural Heritage) in January 2012.

Art historian Jens Thiis was director of The National Gallery between 1908 and 1941. Thiis was internationally oriented and purchased a number of key works for the museum's collection. During this period, the museum also received large donations from industrial heirs Olaf Schou (1909), papal chamberlain and count Christopher Paus (1918), and Chr. Langaard (1922).

==== Paus Collection ====
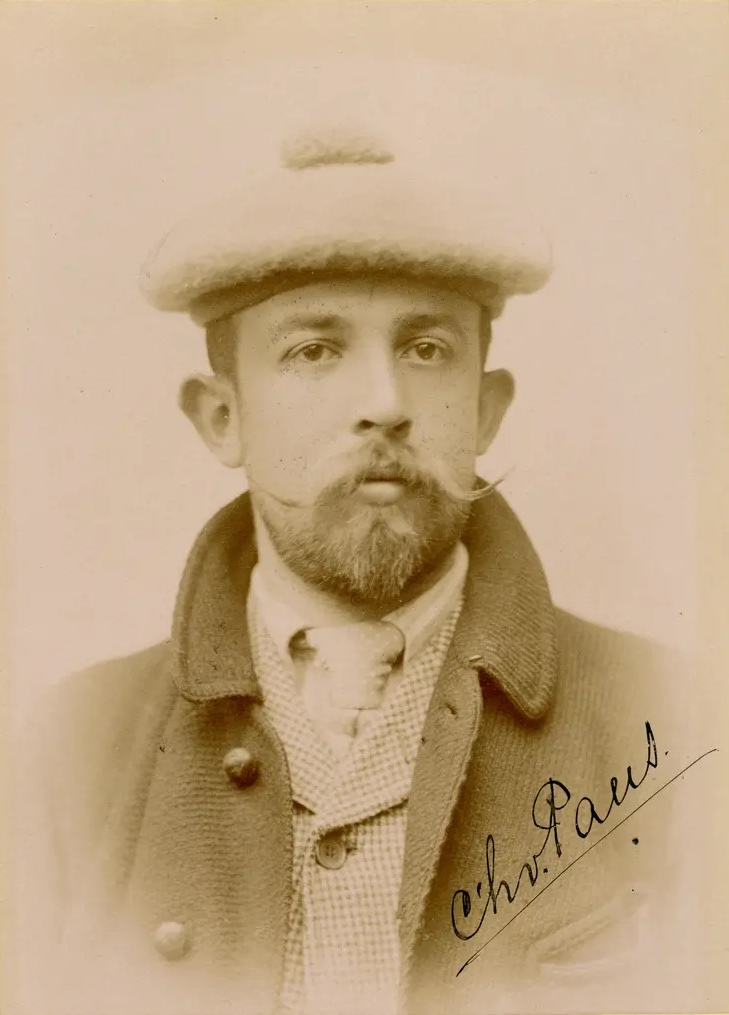
Count Christopher Paus, the creator of the Paus collection and founder of the National Gallery's antiquities collection

Count Christopher Paus amassed one of the largest collections from classical antiquity in Northern Europe, known as the Paus collection. He donated his collection to the then-National Gallery from 1918 and was considered "the founder of the National Gallery's antiquities collection" by art historian and National Antiquarian Harry Fett.

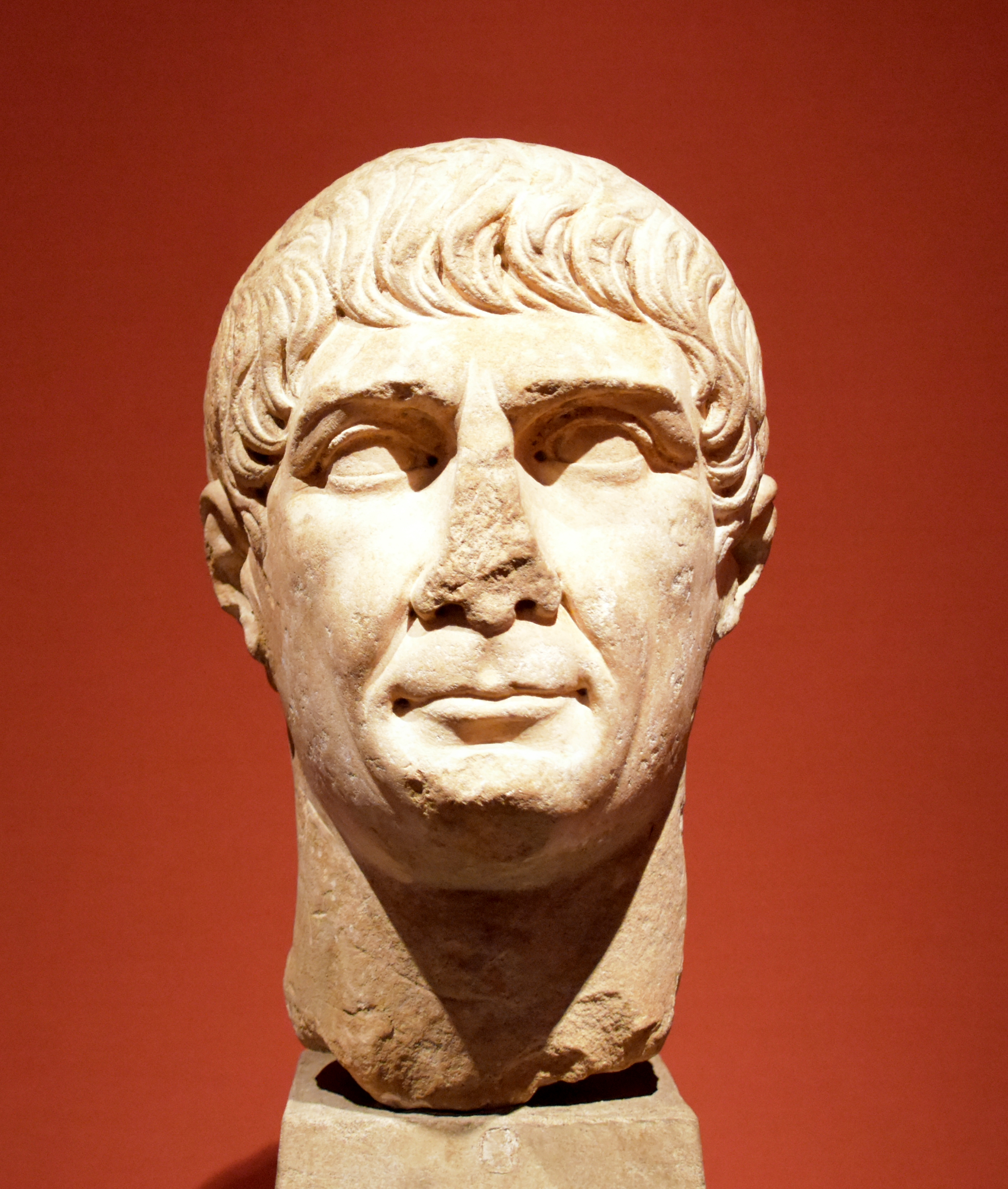
The Paus Trajan, a bust of Trajan that is part of the Paus collection that was donated to the National Gallery by papal chamberlain Christopher Paus from 1918

Paus was an heir to one of Norway's largest timber companies (Tostrup & Mathiesen) as well as a relative of Henrik Ibsen, and the only Ibsen relative who ever visited Ibsen during his decades in exile. From the 1880s Paus lived in Rome, where he became a papal chamberlain and count, as well as an art collector. During that time, Rome was marked by significant expansion and extensive construction work, which unearthed many archaeological finds. At the same time, many artifacts ended up on the market because several Italian noble families who had collected them were unable to handle the transition from feudalism to a modern society. It was also much easier to export antiquities from Italy during this period. Both Paus and other foreign art collectors, such as Carl Jacobsen, built large collections during this period and brought them back to their native countries. Paus turned down an offer from Ny Carlsberg Glyptotek to acquire the collection, instead donating it to the Norwegian government and the National Gallery where it was meant to become the foundation of a Norwegian museum or department dedicated to classical antiquity. The collection includes busts of the emperors Trajan, Galba, Lucius Verus, and (presumably) Commodus, the empress Julia Domna, a bust of Cleopatra's grandson Ptolemy of Mauretania, and several busts of Roman women.

==== National Gallery paintings collection ====
The museum has a vast collection of Norwegian Romantic Nationalism movement paintings, as well as Edvard Munch's works. The main part of the collection of older art consists of Norwegian paintings and sculptures from the 1800s.

Edvard Munch's Scream and some of his other renowned works are among the highlights of the National Gallery's collection. Other significant artists include J.C Dahl, Adolph Tidemand, Hans Gude, Harriet Backer, and Christian Krohg. The collection from the 20th century shows the evolution within Norwegian visual arts with references and key works from Nordic and foreign art within paintings, sculpture, photos, video and other mediums.

In 1990 the museum's collection from after 1945 was transferred to the newly established Museum of Contemporary Art.

The launch of a new basic exhibition "Everyone is Talking About the Museum" in 2005 increased visitor numbers but also had some negative reaction.

The most heavily debated decision was to divide the museum's ‘Munch Room’ and show Munch's works together with other contemporary painters. Another decision was to replace the chronological principle with a thematic one. The permanent exhibition was once again revisited in 2011. ‘The Dance of Life: Collections from the Ancients To 1950’, the Munch Room and the chronological principle has been reinstated. The new permanent exhibition has been praised as ‘a short version of the world’s art history instead of a revisit of the museum’s own collection’.

=== Graphics and drawing collection ===
The museum's extensive graphic and drawing collection includes almost 50,000 Norwegian and foreign works, and spans from the end of the 1400s to current day. Central artists include Durer, Rembrandt, Van Gogh, Goya, Picasso, Manet, Rafael, Rubens, Munch, Tidemand, Dahl, Werenskiold, and Kittelsen. Newer Norwegian graphics and drawn art is also well represented.

=== Museum for Contemporary Art (1990–2017) ===
The Museum for Contemporary Art was established in 1988 and was located at Bankplassen 4 in Oslo. The collection consisted of works from the former National Exhibition and National Gallery, including later purchases. The 1907 museum building, designed by Ingvar Hjorth, formerly housed the Norwegian Bank. The museum opened for the public in 1990 and became a part of the National Museum in 2003.

The museum had alternating exhibitions in the 2000 m large^{2} facilities. In and outside the museum installations by the artists Per Inge Bjørlo, Inner Space VS. the Goal (1990) and the gallery room was dedicated to Louise Bourgeois. The collection consisted of over 5000 Norwegian and foreign works from the period of 1945 to the 21st century. Known Norwegian artists within the collection were Anna-Eva Bergman, Leonard Rickhard, Bjarne Melgaard, and Marianne Heske. Known international artists include Mario Merz, Cindy Sherman, Ilya Kabakov, and Isaac Julien. The collection was continually expanded with yearly purchases of art work.

The Museum of Contemporary Art closed its doors in September 2017, and the contemporary art collection was moved to the new National Museum which opened in June 2022.

=== National Museum – Architecture ===
The Architecture Museum was established by the Norwegian Architects National Association in 1975 and became a part of the National Museum 1 July 2003. The building on Kongens Gate 4 was in use up until March 2005. The museum renamed the National Museum – Architecture, opened in 2008 at a new location, Bankplassen 3 in Oslo.

The museum is located in three separate buildings that are built together. The main building – the oldest section – was the Norges Banks Christianiaavdeling which was designed by Christian H. Grosch and was finished in 1830. Diagonally behind is Sverre Fehns addition from 2002 – the Ulltveit-Moe Pavilion. There is also a storage building from 1911, designed by Henry Bucher.

National Museum – Architecture shows alternating exhibits from the collection that consists of models, drawing, and photographs. The National Museum has Norway's most important architecture collection, featuring more than 300,000 items dated from the 1830s to current day. The collection highlights and documents different aspects of architectural culture and is mainly made up of private archives or fragments of archives. These span over a large variation of materials and mediums: architectural drawings, photographs, models, conceptual studies, sketchbooks, correspondences and ephemera. The collection's main focus is the 1900s, and names within Norwegian architectural history such as Ove Bang, Blakstad of Munthe, Jan & Jon, Knut Knutsen, Arne Korsmo, Christian Norberg-Schulz, Magnus Poulsson, and Erling Viksjø are well represented. Pritzker Prize winner Sverre Fehns is also a highlight of the collection.

=== Art Industry Museum ===
The Art Industry Museum is located at St. Olavs gate 1. The building was constructed in 1902 after Kristiania County decided, in 1896, to construct a new building at the then Brandt løkke, on the corner of Ullevålsveien and St. Olavs gate. In 1897 they had an architecture competition, and of the 14 proposals the 26-year old architect Adolf Brendo Greve was declared the winner. Due to his young age he asked the more experienced Ingvar Hjorth for assistance.

The museum itself was created by the initiative of professor Lorentz Dietrichson and antiquarian Nicolay Nicolaysen in 1876, and the museum was founded by the country that same year. That makes the museum amongst the first in Norway and one of the earliest art industry museums in Europe. This initiative was most likely based on the newly founded state of Norway's need to show themselves as an independent and individual nation. The collection of designs and handicrafts ranges from ancient Greek vases and East Asian artefacts to European style history. It includes costume, fashion and textiles, furniture, silver, glass, ceramics, design and crafts. The unique Baldishol rug from the 12th century, the royal costume collection, Nøstetangen glass, Norwegian silver and Herrebøe faience are among the highlights.

Due to preparations for moving to the new National Museum, the Museum of Art and Design closed on 16 October 2016. The collection will be part of the new National Museum, which opens in 2020.

=== National exhibitions ===
This was established in 1953 as a government agency under the culture department, to send travelling exhibitions of Norwegian and Nordic art to other parts of the country. The agency sent out 142 exhibitions in the 34 years it existed. The National Exhibition built up their own collections, as well as borrowed works for their exhibits. The main aim and motto is ‘Art to the People’.

When the Museum for Contemporary Art was established in 1988, the National Gallery became a part of the museum, from 1992 with the name ‘Riksutstillinger’(National Exhibitions).

The National Exhibitions The national exhibitions were a national art communication, whose task was to create interest and understanding of visual arts, crafts, photography, design and architecture. It was a national competence centre for dissemination, exhibition technique and design. National Exhibitions had five departments: administration, programme, dissemination, information, and department for exhibition design.

From 1992 to 2005 it also had the function of organizing exhibitions outside the usual – such as large exhibitions from other continents (Saana Africa (Art from South-Africa), Fråvær (Absence), Vietnam Express, etc.). From 2005 the National Exhibition was disbanded, its dissemination responsibility transferred to Landsdekkende (Nationwide) Program, a part of the National Museum for Art, Architecture, and Design.

== Selected collection highlights ==
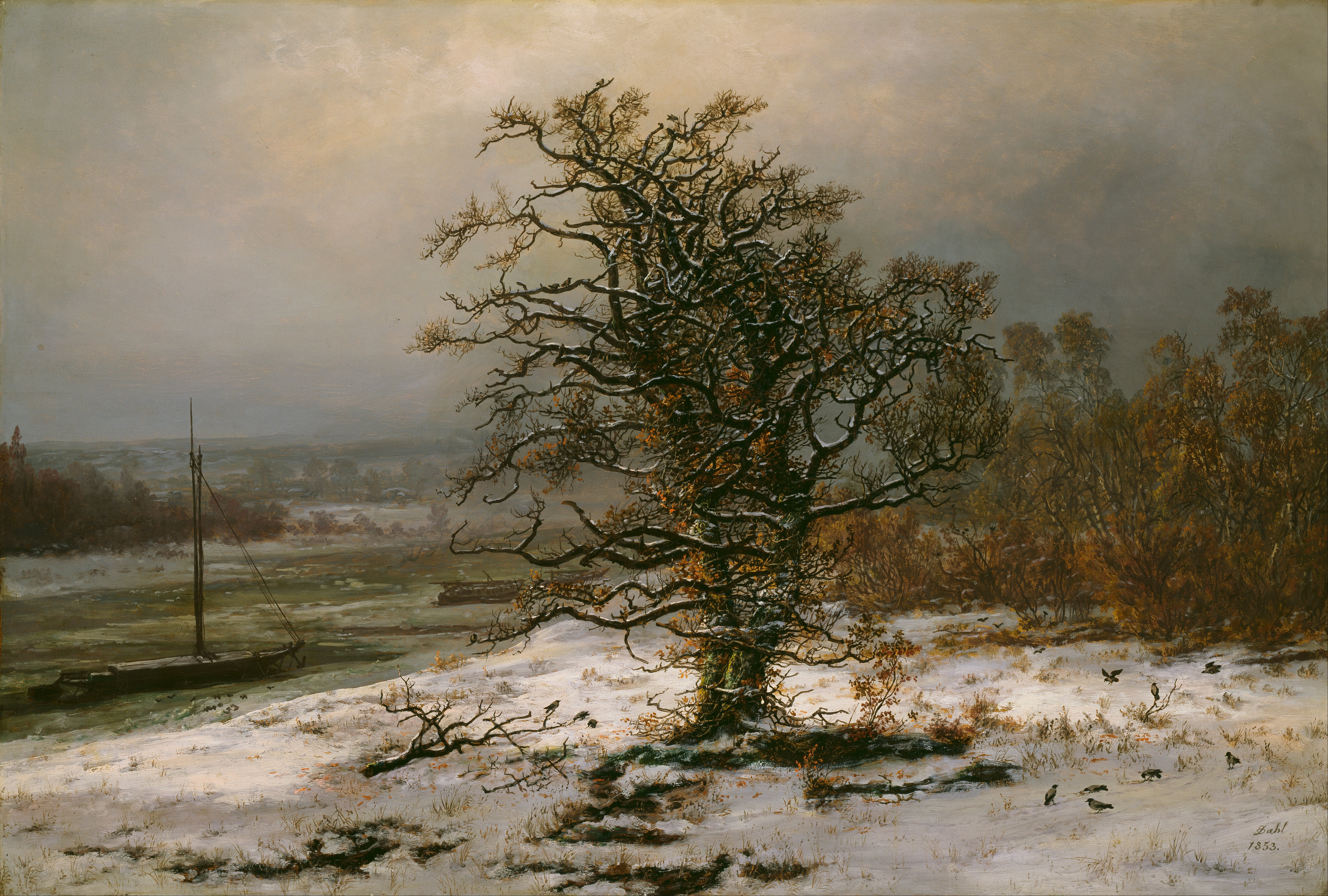
Johan Christian Dahl

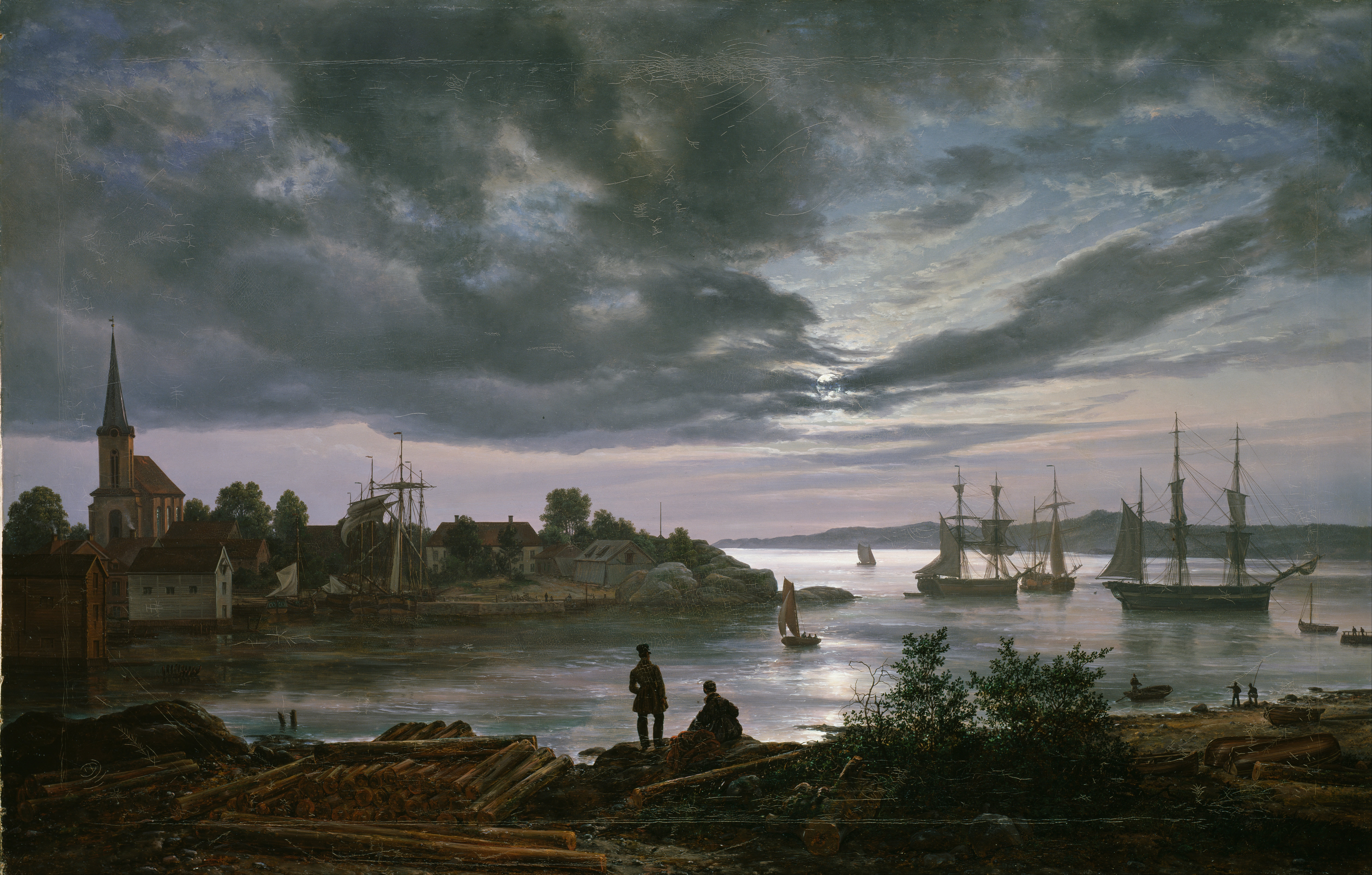
Johan Christian Dahl

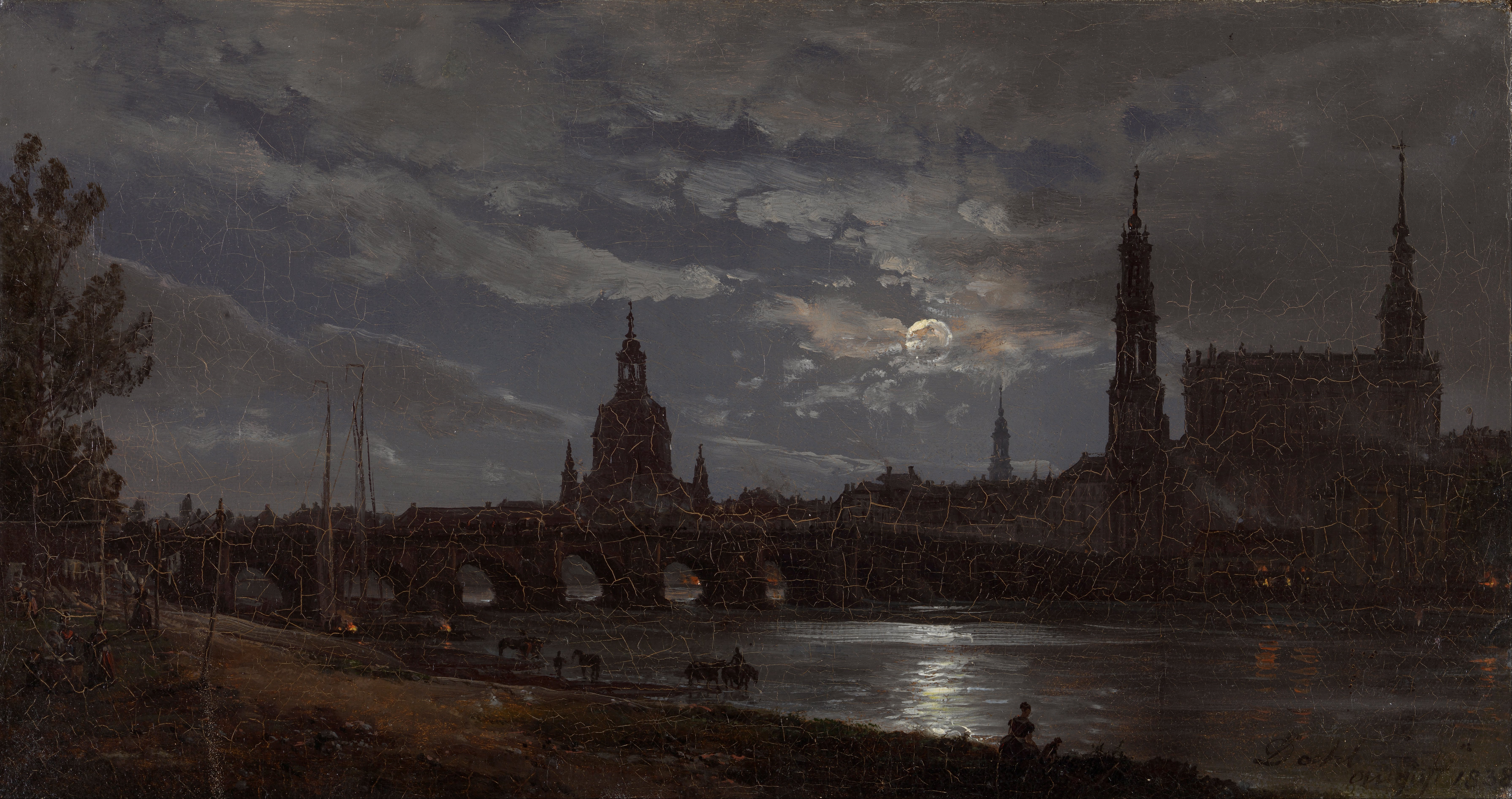
Johan Christian Dahl

== Conflicts ==
From the beginning, the National Museum was marked by conflicts, both on an administrative, artistic and political level. The first director of the National Museum was Swedish Sune Nordgren (until August 2006). Nordgren resigned as director after a long period of professional criticism and staff conflicts at the museum. On 1 August 2007, Allis Helleland took over as the new director. Under her leadership, the conflicts at the museum persisted, and Helleland was subjected to criticism both from employees at the museum and from the professional circles outside. She retired on 11 August 2008. The board appointed Ingar Pettersen as general manager. The museum's chairman of the board since the beginning, Christian Bjelland, resigned his position later that autumn, and was replaced by Svein Aaser. The director from 2009 till 2017 was Audun Eckhoff, who was succeeded by Karin Hindsbo.

== Directors ==
- Sune Nordgren (2003–2006),
- Anne Kjellberg (acting; 2006–2007)
- Allis Helleland (2007–2008)
- Ingar Pettersen (acting; 2008–2009)
- Audun Eckhoff (2009–2017)
- Karin Hindsbo (2017–2023)
- Ingrid Røynesdal (2023–present)

== See also ==
- List of national galleries
