= Kvesarum Castle =

Castle and estate in Hörby Municipality, Scania, Sweden

Coordinates: 55.939136°N 13.655942°E

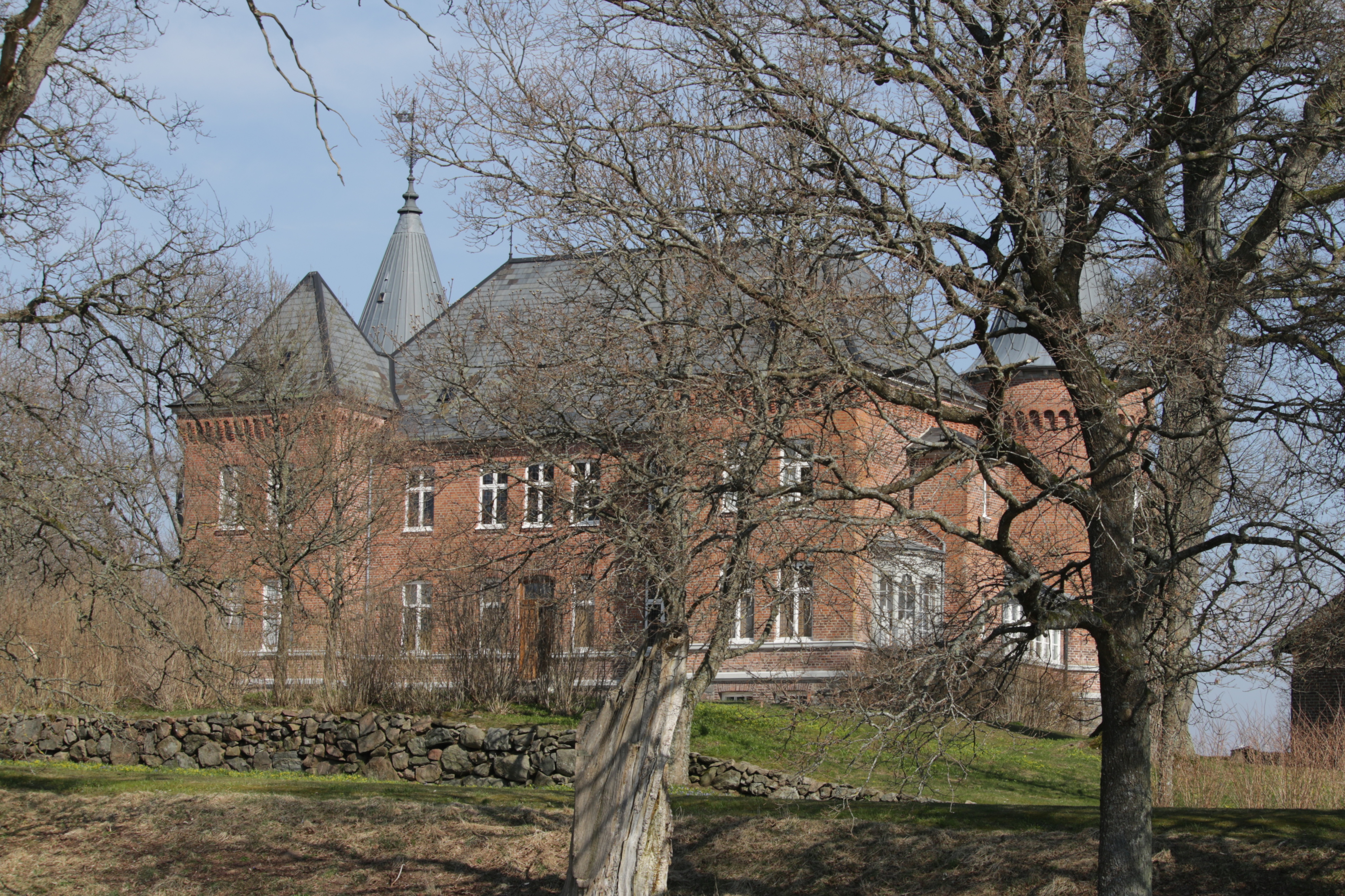
Kvesarum Castle

Kvesarum Castle or Qvesarum Castle (Swedish: Kvesarums slott or Qvesarums slott) is a castle and an estate, located in Södra Rörum of the Hörby Municipality, Scania, Sweden.

It is first mentioned in 1388, then spelled Quixarum. The current building was completed in 1865.

The current owner is Christina Feith-Wachtmeister (née Wachtmeister), who is married to the Dutch diplomat Pieter Feith.

== Owners ==
- 1388-1536 Lund Cathedral Chapter
- 1536-1607 The Danish Crown
- 1607-1637 Sigvardt Grubbe
- 1637- von Böhmen
- Anders Daniel Stierneloo-Lillienberg
- Johan Christoffer von Rohr
- Christoffer Bogislaus Zibèt
- Ebbe Ludvig Ziebeth
- Erik Gustaf Ruuth
- Melker Falkenberg
- Peter Axel Dahl
- Vivika Charlotta Kristina Trolle married Dahl
- 1865–1894 Wladimir Moltke-Huitfeldt
- 1894–1917 Adam Wladimir Moltke-Huitfeldt
- 1936–1951 Thorleif Paus
- Christina Feith-Wachtmeister
