= Leiv Amundsen =

Norwegian librarian and philologist

Leiv Amundsen (30 May 1898 – 25 June 1987) was a Norwegian librarian and philologist.

He was born in Tjøme Municipality as a son of sailmaker Carl Amundsen (1851–1916) and Henrikke Elise Andersen (1857–1923). He attended upper secondary school in Drammen, and worked at the University Library of Oslo at the same time as studying classical philology at the Royal Frederick University. He never actually graduated from the university, but was instead promoted manager of the manuscript collection at the University Library in 1923. He specialized in papyrology, first as the assistant of Samson Eitrem. He was a research fellow with Rockefeller grants from 1926 to 1929, and studied abroad. Among others he was a part of the University of Michigan Archaeological Expedition in Karanis, and published Greek Ostraca in the University of Michigan Collection. Part I. Texts in 1935. He took the dr.philos. degree in 1933, and was hired as a docent at the Royal Frederick University in 1935. He was promoted to professor in 1946. Amundsen was also secretary-general of the Norwegian Academy of Science and Letters from 1954 to 1961. He had been a fellow of the Academy since 1935. He retired in 1968.

Throughout his career he published diaries and letters of Bernhard Herre, Camilla Collett, Peter Jonas Collett and Henrik Wergeland. In 1976 he co-published the correspondence between Johan Ernst Gunnerus and Carl von Linné between 1761 and 1772. He also published the two-volume history of the Norwegian Academy of Science and Letters, in 1957 and 1960, and wrote large parts of the two-volume work on the University of Oslo from 1911 to 1961. He also contributed significantly to the first edition of Norsk biografisk leksikon, and edited Gyldendals nye konversasjonsleksikon, issued in four editions between 1948 and 1958.

From May 1928 Amundsen was married to Inger Sandberg (1898–1985). He died in June 1987 in Bærum Municipality. He had lived at Stabekk and Capralhaugen.
