= Ingrid Røynesdal =

Norwegian museum director

- Born: 1978 (age 47–48); Trondheim, Norway
- Education: University of Oslo; Norwegian Academy of Music
- Occupation: Museum director
- Employer: National Museum of Norway

Ingrid Røynesdal (born 1978) is a Norwegian museum director. She has been director of the National Museum of Norway since 2023.

== Personal life and education ==
Born in Trondheim in 1978, Røynesdal graduated in political science from the University of Oslo in 2005, and as pianist from Norwegian Academy of Music the same year.

== Career ==
Røynesdal served as leader of the Oslo Philharmonic from 2013 to 2023. In 2023 she was appointed director of the National Museum of Art, Architecture and Design in Oslo, succeeding Karin Hindsbo.

She has been a board member of Aschehoug, the Ultima Oslo Contemporary Music Festival and Arbeidsgiverforeningen Spekter.
