= Carl Adolph Grevesmühl =

Swedish businessman

Carl Adolph Grevesmühl (1744–1827) was a Swedish businessman from Stockholm.

== Life and career ==
He was commissioned by King Gustav III of Sweden to furnish Stockholm Castle. Grevesmühl owned the Zinkensdamm estate between 1790 and 1811, and in 1810, he bought Herresta.

== Literature ==
- Arne Munthe: Västra Södermalm intill mitten av 1800-talet (1959)
