= Oskar Mosfjeld =

Norwegian literary scholar

Frantz Oskar Mosfjeld (20 January 1896 – 21 April 1977) was a Norwegian literary scholar known for his widely cited (in the field) opus magnum on Henrik Ibsen's biography, Henrik Ibsen og Skien: En biografisk og litteratur-psykologisk studie, published by Gyldendal Norsk Forlag in 1949, and for which he was awarded the philosophical doctorate in 1950. He worked as a lecturer at Vestheim skole until retiring in 1963.

== Publications ==
- «Vildanden», Edda 56 (1956) nr 1-4 (Ibsen-jubileumsnummer)
- «Det menneskelige innhold i Vildanden», Ibsenårbok, 1952
- Henrik Ibsen og Skien: En biografisk og litteratur-psykologisk studie, Oslo, Gyldendal Norsk Forlag, 1949
