= Siri Sande =

Norwegian archaeologist and professor (born 1943)

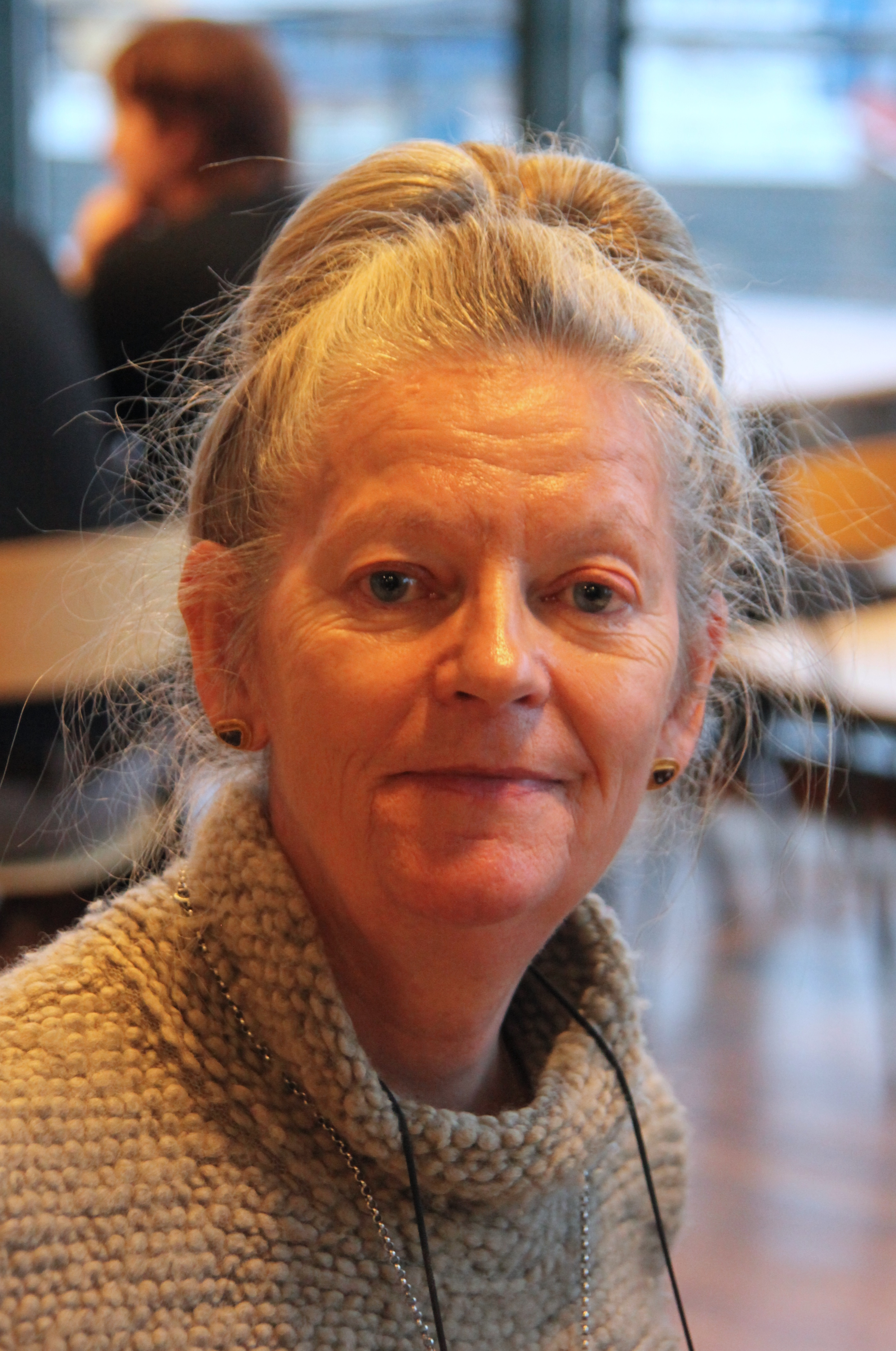
Professor Siri Sande in 2009

Siri Sande (born 27 September 1943) is a Norwegian Professor Emerita of Archaeology. She specialises in Roman material culture, specifically late antique culture and visual art.

== Education ==
Sande studied classical archaeology, art history, and classical languages at the University of Oslo. In 1972, the University of Oslo awarded her an MA in classical archaeology. Her MA dissertation focused on Roman portraits in the sixth century CE.

== Career ==
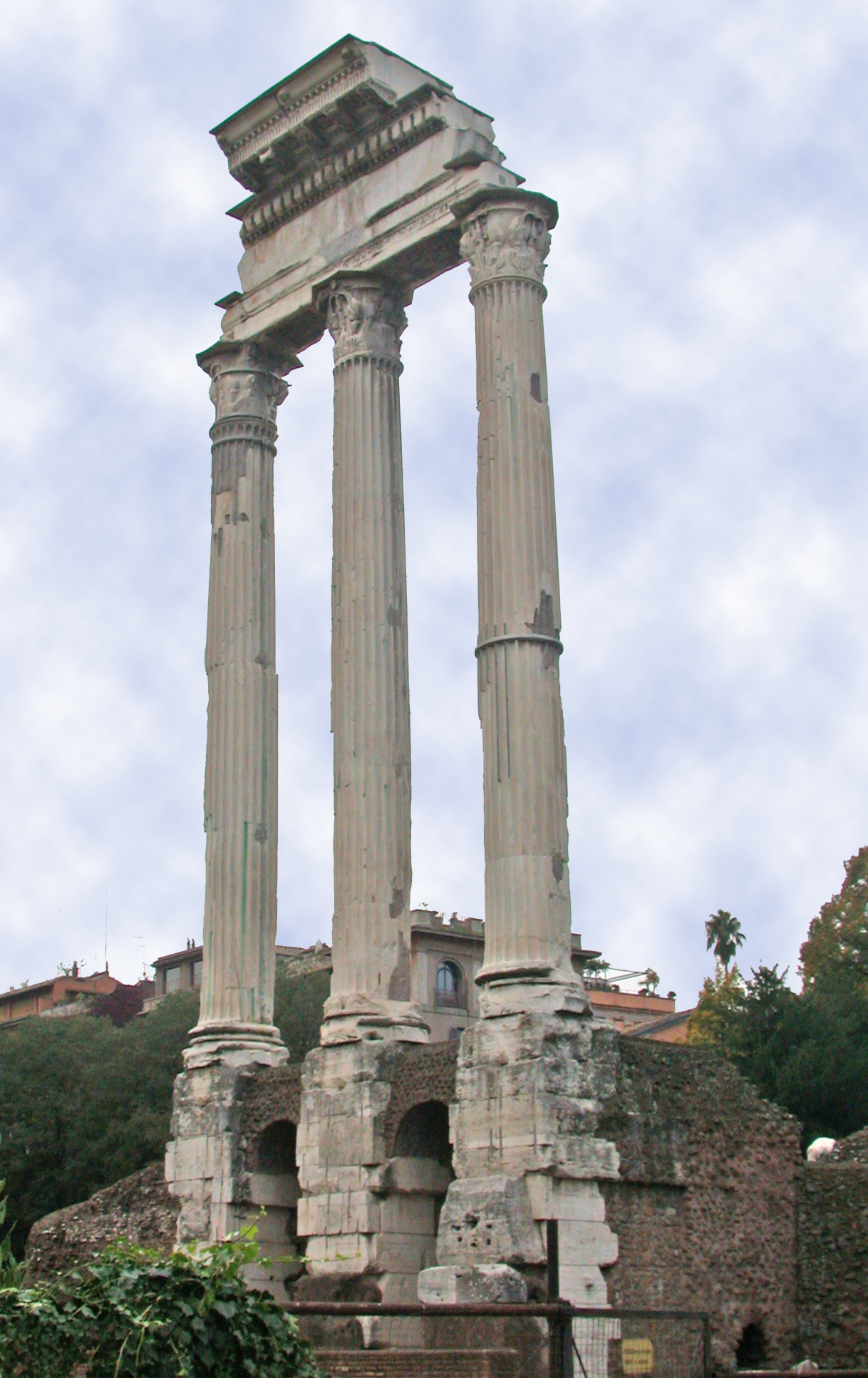
Remains of the Temple of Castor and Pollux, the Roman Forum, Rome

From 1975, Sande was assistant professor in classical archaeology at the University of Oslo, and was Professor from 1996. Sande contributed to the excavation of the Temple of Castor and Pollux in the Roman Forum in Rome, 1983–9. She was deputy director of the Norwegian Institute in Rome 1983–1990. She was Director of the Institute 2003–07.

Sande is the daughter of the writer Jakob Sande (1906–1967).

== Bibliography ==
- Siri Sande, “The Arch of Constantine -- Who Saw What?,” in Patrons and Viewers in Late Antiquity, eds. Stine Birk and Birte Poulsen (Aarhus University Press, 2012)
- Kjell Aage Nilson, Claes B. Persson, Siri Sande, and Jan Zahle, The Temple of Castor and Pollux III: The Augustan Temple. Occasional papers of the Nordic Institutes in Rome, 4. Roma: "L'Erma" di Bretschneider, 2009
