= Trystorp =

Coordinates: 59°5′28″N 14°49′50″E

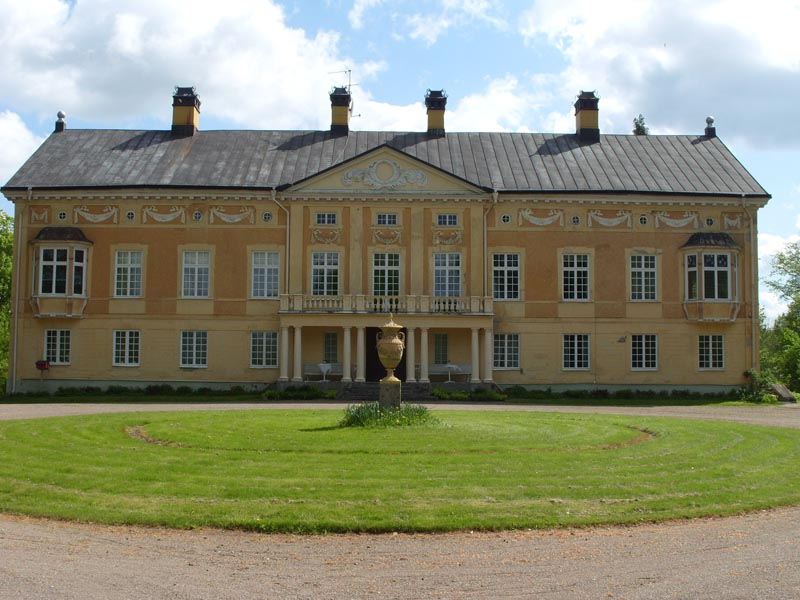
Trystorp

Trystorp is a Swedish estate and château in Lekeberg, Närke, Sweden. It includes 687 ha land. To the south of the château, there is a nature reserve which is open to the public, with a rich fauna and many old oaks.

The estate was established by Biskop Kort Rogge in 1495, who bought land in the area. The Livonian nobleman Henrik von Falkenberg was subsequently awarded Trystorp as a fief. The Falkenberg family owned the estate from 1603 to 1816, when it was sold to publisher N.M. Lindh. His heirs sold the estate to businessman Julius Lindström in 1868. From 1914 to 1918, it was owned by Christopher de Paus. In 1937, it was acquired by Astrid Ziebach de Jonquiéres, whose heirs still own it. It was announced for sale in 2009.

In the 16th century, King Charles IX of Sweden was a frequent guest at Trystorp.
