= Karin Hindsbo =

Danish art historian and museum director (born 1974)

- Born: 1974 (age 51–52)
- Education: Aarhus University; Humboldt Universität zu Berlin
- Occupation: museum director

Karin Hindsbo (born 1974) is a Danish art historian and museum director. She has been the director of the Tate Modern in London since September 2023. She was previously the director of the National Museum of Art, Architecture and Design in Oslo, Norway.

== Early life and education ==
Hindsbo studied at Aarhus University and Humboldt Universität zu Berlin. She graduated as cand.mag. in art history and history of ideas from Aarhus University in 2002.

== Career ==
Hindsbo was assigned with Institut for Samtidskunst in Copenhagen from 2002 to 2005, and also served as a lecturer at the University of Copenhagen from 2003 to 2006. She chaired Den Frie Udstillingsbygning from 2006 to 2011.

Hindsbo edited the art magazine Øjeblikket from 2003 to 2011.

In 2012, Hindsbo was appointed director of Sørlandets Art Museum in Kristiansand. She held the position until 2014 after being assigned the role of director of KODE Kunstmuseene i Bergen, where she served until 2017.

=== National Museum of Art, Architecture and Design (Oslo) ===
In 2017, Hindsbo was appointed director of the National Museum of Art, Architecture and Design in Oslo. During the museum's construction phase, Hindsbo faced criticism from Norwegian newspapers regarding her management style, procurement choices, and delays in the museum's opening. In an interview with The New York Times, Hindsbo acknowledged that, given her Danish background, she expected the opposition to be more intense. Despite the initial backlash, the museum fared well.

Hindsbo’s successor at the National Museum, Ingrid Røynesdal was appointed to the position as director from October 2023.

=== Tate Modern ===
Hindsbo was named director of the Tate Modern in London on 28 April 2023, and took up the role in September 2023.

In addition to her role at Tate Modern, Hindsbo served on the jury of the Marcel Duchamp Prize in 2026.
