= Christopher de Paus =

Norwegian landowner and socialite

Christopher Paus
- Count of Paus
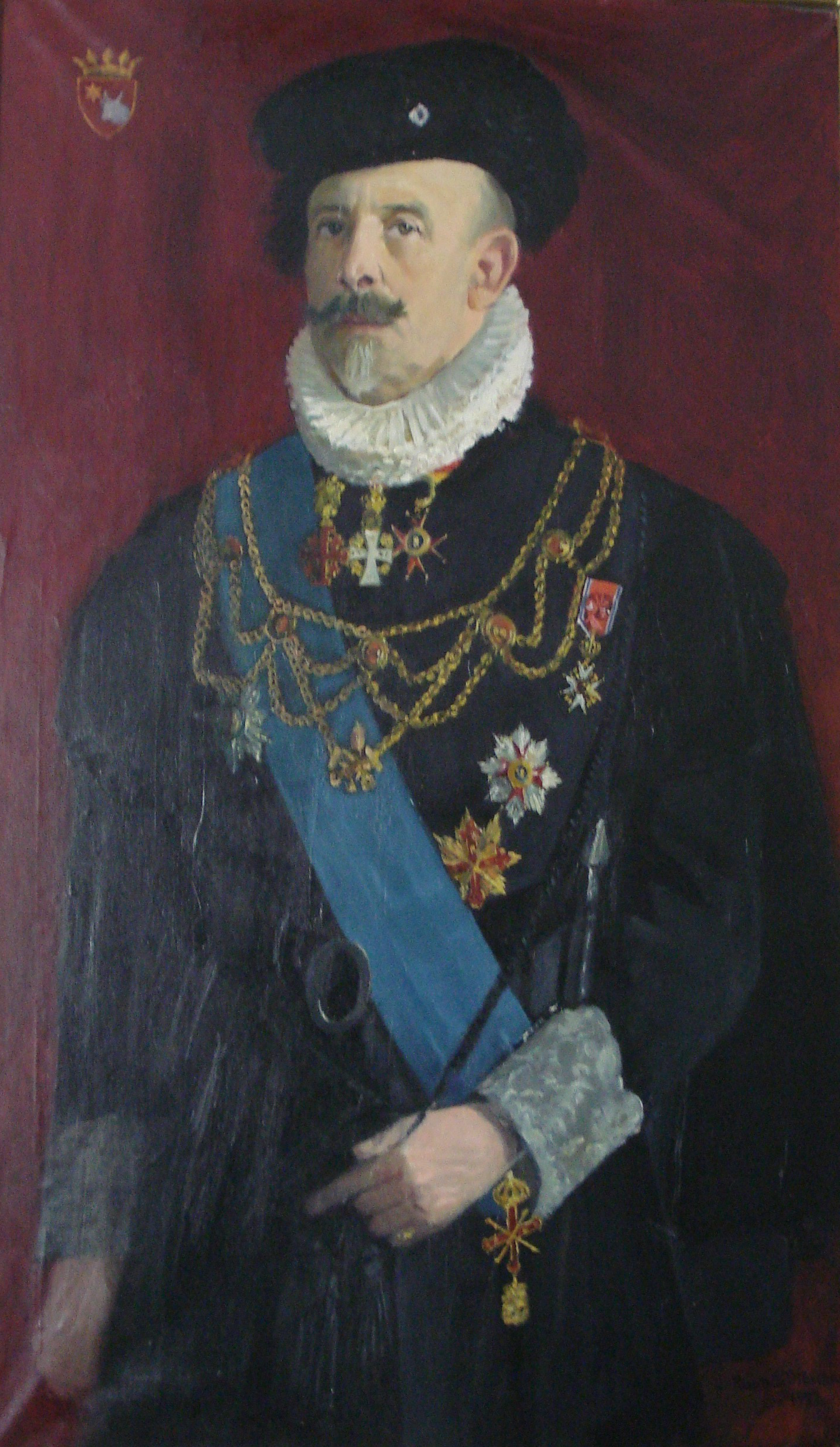
- Christopher Paus (painting, Herresta) in the court dress of a papal chamberlain, in Spanish Renaissance style

- Coat of arms
- Born: 10 September 1862; Christiania, Norway
- Died: 10 September 1943 (aged 81); Skodsborg, Denmark
- Buried: Vår Frelsers gravlund
- Noble family: Paus
- Father: Major Johan Altenborg Paus
- Mother: Agnes Tostrup

Count Christopher de Paus (10 September 1862 – 10 September 1943) (Note: His full name in Norwegian was Christopher Tostrup Paus, though he often omitted his middle name, Tostrup. Internationally, he was commonly known as Christopher de Paus, and as Cristoforo de Paus in Vatican contexts.) was a Norwegian-born aristocrat, papal courtier and philanthropist.

A member of the Paus family—the name means pope—he was heir to the Norwegian timber firm Tostrup & Mathiesen and inherited a fortune from his grandfather, timber magnate Christopher Tostrup. From the 1870s, he spent much of his life in Rome, where he converted to Catholicism. He was appointed as a papal chamberlain by Pope Benedict XV in 1921 and conferred the title of count by Pope Pius XI in 1923. He was a prominent benefactor of museums and the Catholic Church. He donated the Paus collection of classical sculpture that now forms part of the National Museum of Norway. Paus was considered "the founder of the National Gallery's antiquities collection" by Harry Fett.

Christopher Paus, a close relative of playwright Henrik Ibsen, was the only member of Ibsen’s family who visited him during his decades-long exile. In 1923 he bought the estate Herresta in Sweden which is still owned by descendants of his cousin Herman Paus, who was married to a granddaughter of Leo Tolstoy.

== Biography ==
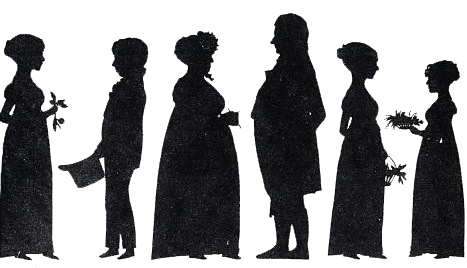
A silhouette of Christopher Paus' grandfather, Henrik Johan Paus (no 2 from left), with Henrik Ibsen's mother Marichen Altenburg (right) and her parents Johan Altenburg and Hedevig née Paus, probably from the late 1810s

Born in Christiania, he belonged to the Skien branch of the Paus family. The family name derives from a Middle Low German word for pope, perhaps originally applied in medieval Oslo as a pious or satirical nickname. He was the son of Major and War Commissioner in Molde Johan Altenborg Paus (1833–1894) and Agnes Tostrup (1839–1863). His father was a son of lawyer and judge Henrik Johan Paus (1799–1893), who owned the estate Østerhaug in Elverum, while his mother was a daughter of timber magnate Christopher Henrik Holfeldt Tostrup (1804–1881), one of the two main owners of Tostrup & Mathiesen, one of Norway's largest timber companies. Christopher Paus's father was also a first cousin of playwright Henrik Ibsen. As a young man, Christopher Paus would visit the then-famous Henrik Ibsen in Rome, where he lived. His great-grandfather Christian Lintrup was one of the pioneers of the medical profession in Norway.

Personal seal of Christopher Paus

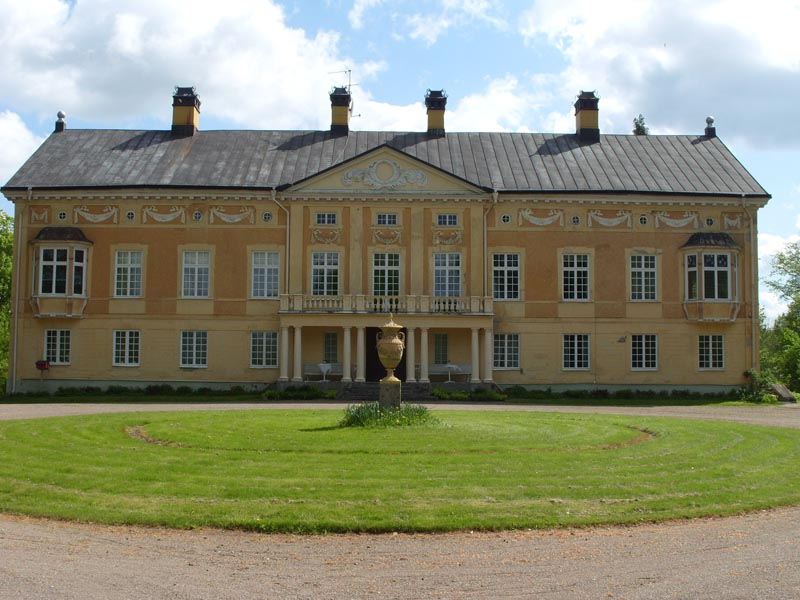
Trystorp château

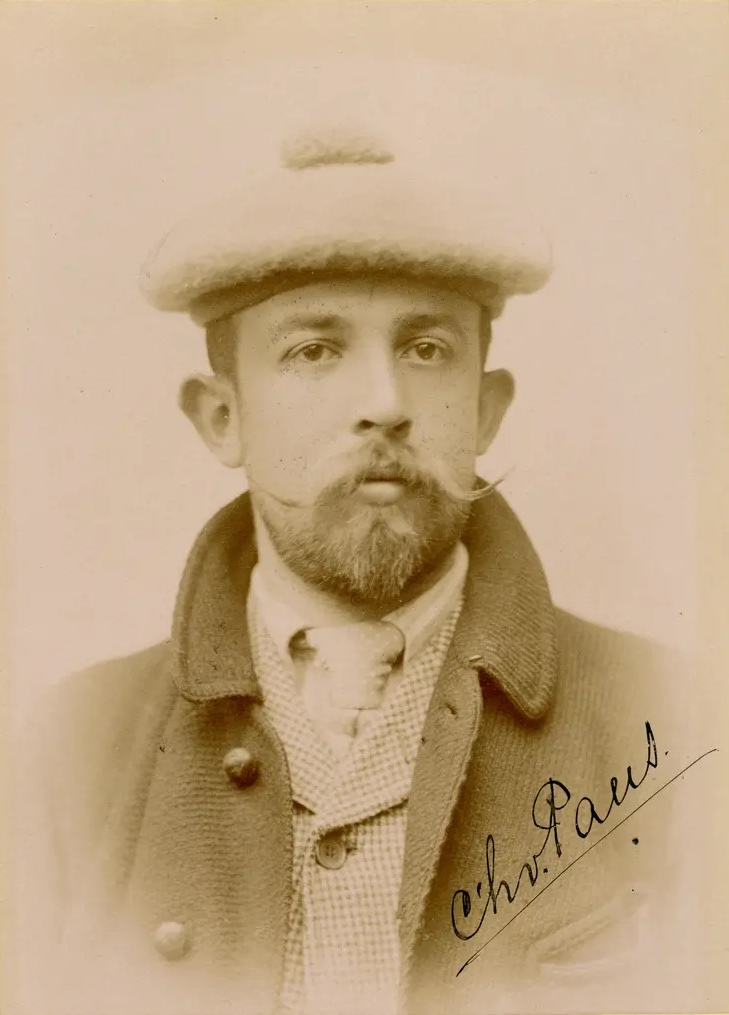
Christopher Paus ca. 1890

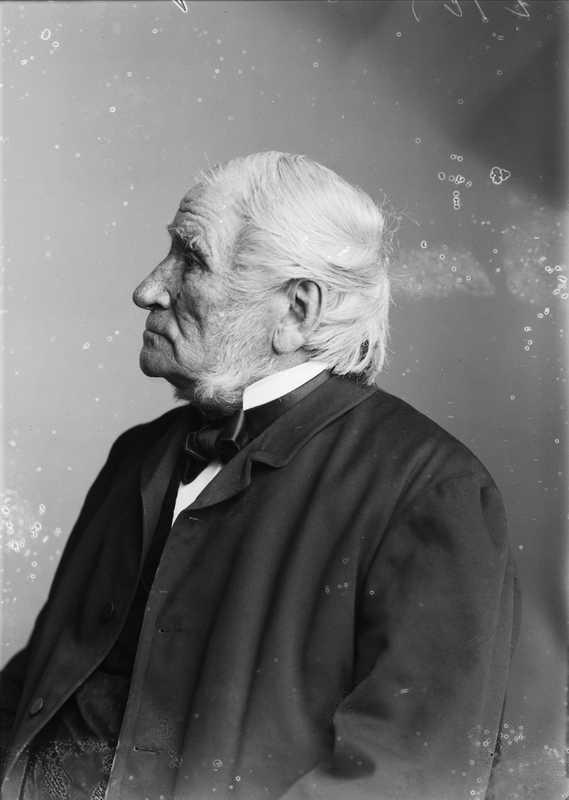
Christopher Tostrup Paus' grandfather, timber magnate Christopher Henrik Holfeldt Tostrup

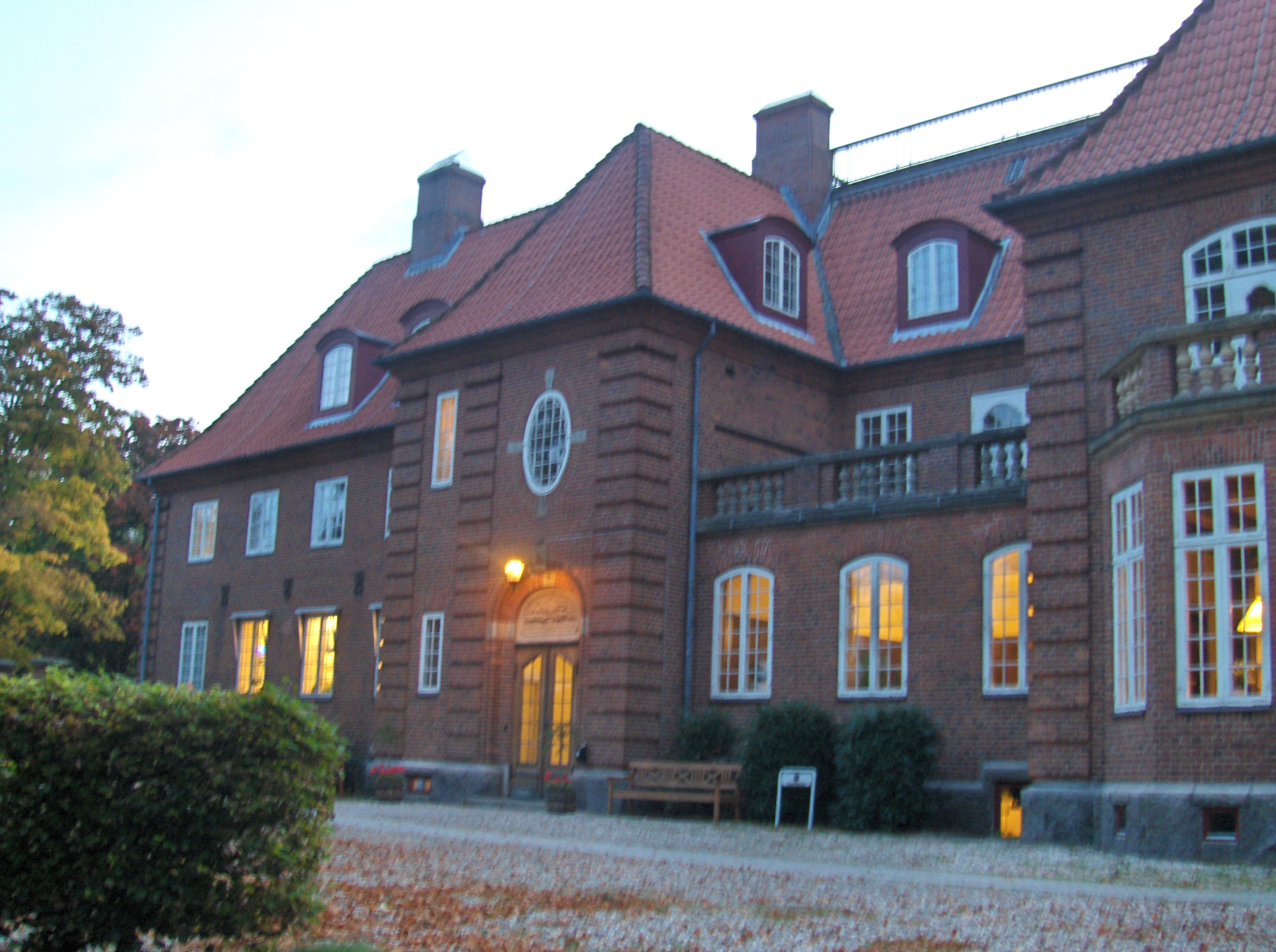
Magleås outside Copenhagen, Denmark

Christopher Paus became a millionaire as a young man when he inherited a fortune from his maternal grandfather and his two childless uncles Oscar and Thorvald Tostrup, who were all co-owners of Tostrup & Mathiesen. His family sold their shares of Tostrup & Mathiesen to their business partners, the Mathiesen family, in the 1890s, and the company was since renamed Mathiesen Eidsvold Værk and continued under that name and as Moelven Industrier. His maternal grandfather had also owned the estate Kjellestad in Stathelle.

A convert from Lutheranism to Roman Catholicism, he was appointed a Privy Chamberlain of the Sword and Cape (Cameriere Segreto di Spada e Cappa) by Pope Benedict XV on 22 February 1921 and re-appointed by Pope Pius XI on 8 February 1922 and by Pope Pius XII on 7 March 1939. By tradition, a Norwegian Catholic would hold this position, and he succeeded Wilhelm Wedel-Jarlsberg who held the post some years earlier. He was conferred the title and rank of Count by Pope Pius XI on 25 May 1923. He bought the estate Narverød near Tønsberg (Norway) in 1892, the estate Trystorp with château in Lekeberg (Sweden) in 1914, and the estate Herresta outside Mariefred (Sweden) in 1923. In 1942, he bought the mansion Magleås outside Copenhagen in Denmark. He divided his time between his various properties in Scandinavia and Rome.

Christopher Paus is known for the Paus collection of classical sculpture that forms part of the National Museum of Art, Architecture and Design in Norway. Previously the largest private collection of classical sculpture in the Nordic countries, he donated it to the National Gallery between 1918 and 1929 as the intended foundation of a Norwegian museum or department of classical sculpture. He also made donations to museums throughout the Nordic countries and in Rome.

He died in Skodsborg in Denmark without children in 1943, and bequeathed much of his estate to select members of the Paus family. In 1938, Herresta was sold to his second cousin Herman Paus, who had married Countess Tatyana Tolstoy, a granddaughter of Leo Tolstoy; their descendants still own Herresta and other Swedish estates. Magleås was inherited by Thorleif Paus, who sold it to the Catholic Church some years later. It was held a mass for him, as a member of the Papal Court, in the Pope's private chapel on 14 September 1943 with Pope Pius XII in attendance. He is buried at Vår Frelsers gravlund in Oslo, in the same grave as his mother, maternal grandfather and other members of the Tostrup family.

== Titles and honours ==
He was conferred the title of Count by Pope Pius XI on 25 May 1923. He was styled as "His Excellency" in accordance with custom.

He was usually known as Christopher Tostrup Paus or just Christopher Paus in Norway, but like some other family members he used the name de Paus abroad as an international form of the name, and he was ennobled under the name de Paus by the Holy See. In the Acta Apostolicae Sedis and the Annuario Pontificio, his name is partially translated into Italian as conte Cristoforo de Paus. He used the translation von Paus in German contexts.

=== Honours ===
Papal and Catholic honours

- (Holy See) Knight of the Order of Pius IX
- (Holy See) Knight Grand Cross of the Order of St. Gregory the Great
- (Holy See) Knight Commander with star of the Order of the Holy Sepulchre
- Knight of the Magistral Grace in gremio religionis of the Sovereign Military Order of Malta (1924)
- (Kingdom of the Two Sicilies) Knight Grand Cross of the Sacred Military Constantinian Order of Saint George (1923)
- (Holy See) Gentleman of the Chamber

Scandinavian orders of knighthood

- (Iceland) Commander with Star (Stórriddarakross með stjörnu) of the Order of the Falcon (1937) (Commander, 1924)
- (Norway) Commander of the Order of St. Olav (1938) (Knight First Class, 1919)
- (Denmark) Commander of the Order of the Dannebrog (1922)
- (Sweden) Commander of the Order of Vasa
- Knight First Class of the Order of the White Rose of Finland

A list of honours as of 1934 is found in the book Den Kongelige Norske St. Olavs Orden.

== Ancestry ==
Ancestors of Christopher de Paus

Ole Paus (1776–1855), ship-owner and landowner
Henrik Johan Paus (1799–1893), jurist
Johanne Plesner (1770–1847), (in her first marriage married to Henrich Ibsen 1765–1797)
Johan Altenborg Paus (1833–1894), Major and War Commissioner
Christian Lintrup (1768–1844), county physician (amtsfysikus)
Sophie Lintrup (1806–)
Johanne Hoelfeldt (1774–)
Christopher Paus
Nicolay Tostrup (1768–1858), Captain
Christopher Henrik Holfeldt Tostrup (1804–1881), landowner and co-owner of Tostrup & Mathiesen
Thale Margrethe Resen Holfeldt (1779–1860)
Agnes Tostrup (–1863)
Andreas Schaft (1760–1826), civil servant
Julie Camilla Schaft
Petronelle Nicoline Green (1771–1857)

== Footnotes ==
Italian nobility
| New title | The Count of Paus; 1923—1943 | Extinct |
