= Samson Eitrem =

Norwegian philologist

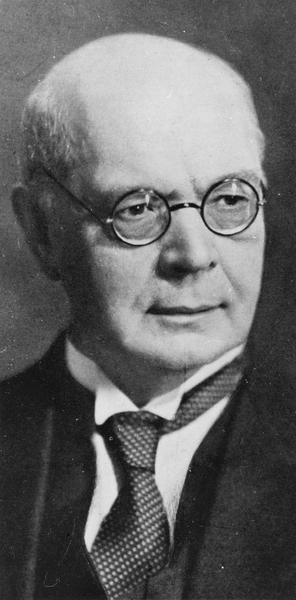
- Born: 28 December 1872; Kragerø, Norway
- Died: 8 July 1966 (aged 93); Oslo
- Education: University of Oslo
- Occupation: classical philologist
- Employer: University of Oslo

Samson Eitrem (28 December 1872 – 8 July 1966) was a Norwegian philologist, an expert in ancient literature, religion and magic.

== Personal life ==
Eitrem was born in Kragerø to Samson Eitrem (1832–1923) and Anine Marie Nielsen, and he was a brother of Hans Eitrem. In 1910 he married Wilhelmina Galtung.

== Career ==
Eitrem passed examen artium in 1890 at the Bergen Cathedral School, and started studying philology. He graduated from the University in Kristiania in 1896, and continued with further studies in Germany, Italy, Great Britain and Greece, graduating as Ph.D. in 1903. He was appointed professor in classical philology at the University of Oslo from 1914 to 1945. His scientific works include Opferritus und Voropfer der Griechen und Römer from 1915, Papyri Osloenses (three volumes, 1926–1936, in collaboration with Leiv Amundsen), and Some notes on the demonology in the New Testament from 1950. He was a co-founder (in 1924) of the scientific journal Symbolae Osloenses, along with Gunnar Rudberg. Eitrem was given honorary doctorates at the University of Athens and the Aristotle University of Thessaloniki. He died in Oslo in 1966.

He was elected a foreign member of the Royal Netherlands Academy of Arts and Sciences in 1946.
