= Herresta =

Estate in Södermanland County, Sweden

Coordinates: 59°19′31″N 17°17′03″E

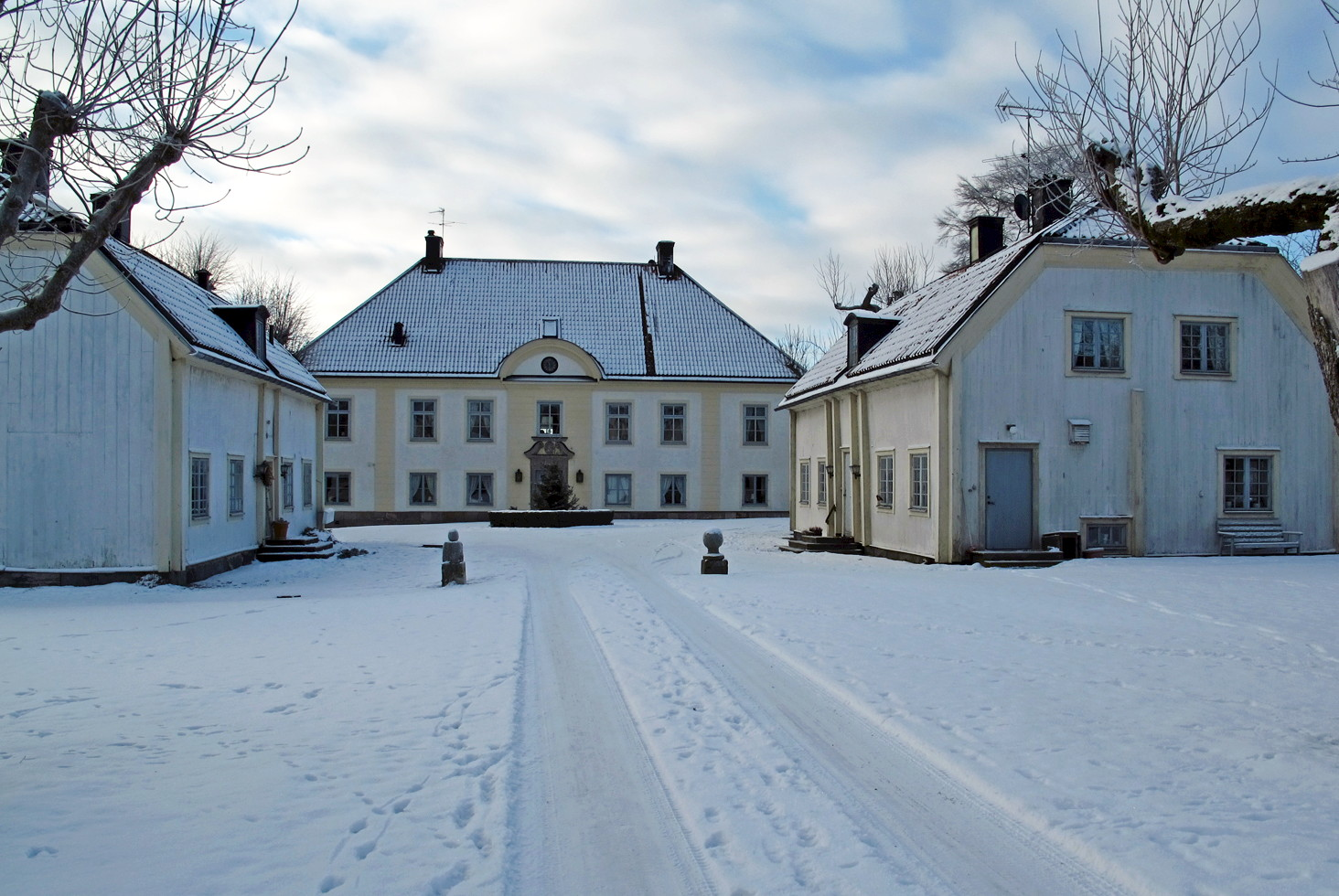
Herresta Manor, 2016

Herresta is an estate in Södermanland County in Sweden, located outside Mariefred. It has been in the possession of the Paus family since 1923.

The manor lies adjacent to Herrestaviken, which was previously connected to Mälaren. Previous owners include Admiral Baron Jonas Fredrik Örnfelt. He built the main house in stone in 1718, using Russian prisoners of war. Count Johan Georg Lillienberg, who was Governor of Uppsala and President of the Appellate Court, among other offices, extended the manor substantially. In 1810, Herresta was sold to wealthy Stockholm businessman Carl Adolph Grevesmühl. His descendants sold the manor to the Norwegian Christopher de Paus in 1923. Himself childless, he bequeathed the estate to a distant relative, Herman Paus. The manor is currently owned by their descendants.

As of 1907, the estate included Herresta säteri and additionally 13 agricultural properties, totalling 15 mtl.

== Literature ==
- Herresta, Nordisk familjebok, 1904–1926
