= Prytz =

Surname

Prytz is a surname. Notable people with the surname include:

- Agneta Prytz (1916–2008), Swedish movie and stage actress
- Andreas Prytz (born 1972), Swedish curler and coach
- Anton Frederik Winter Jakhelln Prytz (1878–1945), Norwegian politician
- Björn Prytz (1887–1976), Swedish industrialist and Swedish envoyé in London
- Claes Johansson Prytz, of the Godunov map
- Daniel Prytz (born 1975), Swedish curler
- Eiler Hagerup Krog Prytz, Jr. (1883–1963), Norwegian goldsmith
- Eiler Hagerup Krog Prytz, Sr. (1812–1900), Norwegian bailiff and politician
- Eva Prytz (1917–1987), Norwegian opera soprano
- Inge Prytz Johnson (born 1945), United States federal judge
- Johan Carl Peter Prytz (1789–1862), Danish naval officer
- Kåre Prytz (1926–1994), Norwegian journalist and novelist
- Malou Trasthe Prytz (born 2003), Swedish singer
- Maria Prytz (born 1976), Swedish curler and coach, 2014 Winter Olympian
- Robert Prytz (born 1960), Swedish former footballer
- Torolf Prytz (1858–1938), Norwegian architect, goldsmith and politician

== See also ==
About Prytz family in Norway: no:Prytz
