= Eiler Hagerup =

Eiler Hagerup may refer to:

- Eiler Eilersen Hagerup (1718–1789), Bishop of Bjørgvin and Christianssand in Norway
- Eiler Hansen Hagerup (1685–1743), Bishop of Nidaros in Norway
- Eiler Hagerup (politician) (1736–1795), Norwegian politician and county governor of Finnmark

== See also ==
- Hagerup, a list of people with the surname Hagerup
- Eiler Hagerup Krog Prytz (disambiguation)
