= Milda Dorothea Prytz =

Norwegian chemist (1891–1977)

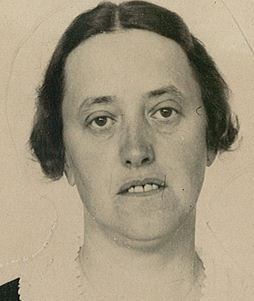
- Born: 22 April 1891; Leith
- Died: October 22, 1977 (aged 86)
- Parent: Anton Jakhelln Prytz
- Relatives: Frederik Prytz (brother); Eiler Hagerup Krog Prytz Jr. (brother); Torolf Prytz (uncle); Carl Frederik Prytz (nephew)

Milda Dorethea Prytz (April 22, 1891 – October 22, 1977) was a Norwegian chemist. She was a lecturer in chemistry at the University of Oslo, and is known for writing two popular textbooks on quantitative analysis and inorganic chemistry.

== Early life and education ==
Prytz was born in Leith, daughter of Frederik Prytz (1853–1937), a minister of religion, and his wife Milda Dorothea Olsen, and sister of goldsmith Eiler Hagerup Krog Prytz Jr. and Fascist politician Frederik Prytz. She grew up in Bergen, until she moved with her parents to Gloppen Municipality in 1904. She attended Bergen Cathedral School from 1908 to 1910.

She was educated at the University of London and gained her doctorate from the University of Oslo.

Her thesis from 1925 is titled Bidrag til azofarvestoffenes reduksjonskinetik.

== Professional life ==
Prytz was a scientific assistant and amanuensis at the University of Oslo for many years (1918–1948), and docent in chemistry 1948–1957. She published regularly in scientific journals on the polarographic analysis of hydroxamic acids and electrolytic reduction of monovalent and polyvalent cations.

She also wrote the textbooks Quantitative Analysis and Inorganic Chemistry, both of which had many editions.
