= Villa Stenersen =

Modernist house in Oslo, Norway

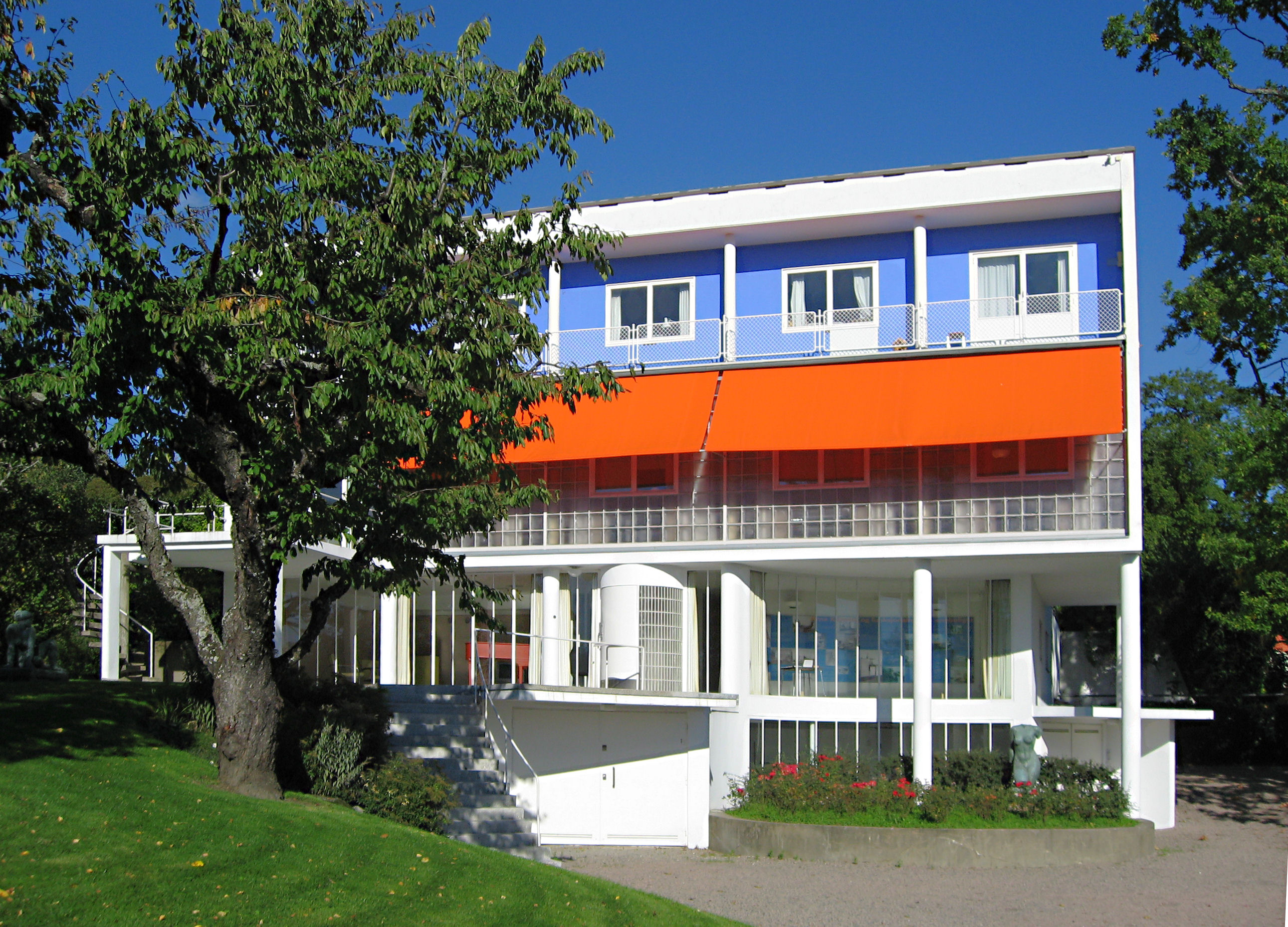
- Interactive map of the Villa Stenersen area

General information
- Type: Single family house
- Architectural style: Modernism, Functionalism
- Location: Borgen, Vindern, Vestre Aker, Tuengen allé 10 C, Oslo, Norway
- Coordinates: 59°56′21″N 10°41′55″E
- Completed: 1937-1939
- Client: Rolf Stenersen
- Owner: Statsbygg and The National museum of Norway

Technical details
- Floor area: 512 m2

Design and construction
- Architect: Arne Korsmo

Villa Stenersen in Oslo was designed by architect Arne Korsmo for the financier, art collector and author Rolf Stenersen and his family in 1939. The house was intended to serve both as a residence and as a gallery for his large art collection, and is considered as one of the main works of architecture in the Norwegian functionalist style. It is also the only Norwegian member of Iconic Houses. It is currently undergoing restoration headed by Statsbygg, in collaboration with the National Gallery and the Stenersen family. The villa is operated by the National Gallery of Norway and is open to the public every Sunday during the summer.

== Restoration ==
- Statsbygg is responsible for technical infrastructure, construction, colours, and surface textures.
- Replacement of period pieces from when Rolf Stenersen lived in the house, which includes Korsmo's tailored solid and loose furniture. Collaboration between Statsbygg, the National Gallery, and Stenersen family. Among others based on historical photographs, like those by Anders Beer Wilse from the Summer '38.

== History ==
After a meeting in 1936, Korsmo began sketching the villa in 1937 and working on detailing in 1938, with the construction was completed in 1939. The architect then arranged a move in party for his client, as evident in the museum's database, showing sketches for invitation cards.

=== Cultural heritage ===
Upon his death in 1974, Rolf Stenersen gifted the villa to the state in his testament. He stated that he wished the house be used as a representative building or as a residence for the prime minister, to which it would later be apparent that it was inopportune for. Berre & Lending remarks that the house may have been considered to be security inefficient, cold in the winters, and perhaps still too radical. Oddvar Norli is the only prime minister who has tried living there, but moved out after two years, because he thought the house too cold during winters. Although in the early 90s, the Minister of Foreign affairs (that is Thorvald Stoltenberg including his son, Jens Stoltenberg) did live in the house for a few years. Afterwards, the villa stood unused for long periods of time. In the late 90s it underwent debatable alterations, and has since served as a venue for a variety of public, cultural events.

In 1999, the Cultural Department employed a cross-ministry team, to consider alternative options for use and the future of the villa. They proposed that the house be used for flexible and official use for various cultural objectives, ideally within the subjects of architecture, design and aesthetics. This will ensure availability to the general public, in combination with being in agreement with the building's character and preservation value, and in Rolf Stenersen's and Arne Korsmo's spirit. The proposal entails that the building will be preserved and conveyed as an important work of architecture. The Norwegian Parliament gave their endorsement to the proposal in connection to the treatment of the national budget of 2000.

The Villa was temporarily listed as a heritage building by the Directorate for Cultural Heritage in 2008, and finally completely listed in 2012.

The Villa was managed by Norsk Form until 2014, when the National Gallery temporarily took on the responsibility until 2017. It's currently not clarified what will happen after 2017.

=== Restoration process ===
Jon Brænne completed colour archeological survey of the house in 2015, that resulted in a report with recommendations for further use. He recommends that the house be renovated and rebuilt as a so-called residence-museum. Under Norsk Form, the Villa was used as a learning centre for architecture and design with job opportunities for scientists and projects. It was meant to be a place for conveying functionalism's architecture and design for a wide audience, with lectures and tours every first Sunday in the month and by appointment. The house could be rented by organizations and companies for arrangements and meetings, which was in "the house's and Stenersen's spirit". Statsbygg is responsible for the daily operation of the property on behalf of the state.

In 2016, around 300 drawings - mostly handed down in no order - were donated by Korsmo's third wife (Hanne Refsdal). Tim Benton has worked way through the surviving drawings, and has written his interpretation of the project's development in an asBUILT Classic 21 book. The conservation work of these drawings were supported by Statsbygg, and a majority of them are now available in the online database of the National Gallery.

Norsk Form furnished the villa in "the spirit of architecture and equipped for use". At present, the National Gallery is working on building a temporary exhibition with authentic furniture from 1939 and beyond. There has also been produced different reproductions of the original paintings by Edvard Munch, which were on display when the house was new, as shown in the original photographies of the house by Anders B. Wilse. They were presented in an exhibition that were in the house until medio 2018. From May to October, the exhibition Le Corbusier by the Sea is run. Some of the original furniture are still on display in the house during this exhibition.

The National Gallery keeps the building open every Sunday in the summer season, and arranges exhibitions and lectures etc.

== Legacy ==
Berre & Lending describes its historical photographs as perhaps not outstanding individually, but capturing "a striking modernist sensibility."

Inspired by Le Corbusier's Five Points for a new architecture, although Korsmo was not concerned with detaching the building from the ground. Norwegian architects did not strictly follow the rules of modernism strictly, and tried to adapt them to Scandinavia's cold weather, where e.g. flat roofs were usually unsuitable. Korsmo has a unique color palette and approach to circulation and volume massing. Continuity in the green color from master bedroom to the master bathroom. Villa Stenersen has integrated technology like central heating systems (radiator) and air condition, which made it unique for its time. In spite of the radiators, Korsmo has still added fireplaces in the basement, living room, and library, reflecting how Le Corbusier considered the hearth as a "'sacred' focus essential for the family".

== Literature ==
- Berre, N. & Lending, M. & Benton, T. & Korsmo, A. (2019). asBUILT Classic 21: Villa Stenersen, Arne Korsmo. Pax. ISBN 9788253041445.
