= Hagerup =

Hagerup is a surname. Notable people with the surname include:

- Caspar Peter Hagerup (1777–1840), Norwegian civil servant
- Edvard Hagerup (1781–1853), Norwegian solicitor and politician
- Edvard Hagerup Bull (1855–1938), Norwegian judge and politician for the Conservative Party
- Edvard Hagerup Bull (composer) (1922–2012), Norwegian composer
- Edvard Hagerup Grieg (1843–1907), Norwegian composer and pianist
- Eiler Eilersen Hagerup (1718–1789), the Bishop of Bjørgvin and Christianssand in Norway
- Eiler Hansen Hagerup (1685–1743), the Bishop of Nidaros in Norway
- Eiler Hagerup Krog Prytz, Jr. (1883–1963), Norwegian goldsmith
- Eiler Hagerup Krog Prytz, Sr. (1812–1900), Norwegian bailiff and politician
- Francis Hagerup (1853–1921), Norwegian lawyer, diplomat and politician for the Conservative Party
- Hans Hagerup Falbe (1772–1830), the Norwegian Minister of Auditing, Minister of the Navy and Minister of Justice
- Hans Hagerup Krag (1829–1907), Norwegian engineer
- Henrik Steffens Hagerup (1806–1859), Norwegian naval officer and politician who served as Minister of the Navy
- Inger Hagerup (1905–1985), Norwegian author, playwright and poet
- Klaus Hagerup (1946–2018), Norwegian author, translator, screenwriter, actor and director
- Mathias Hagerup (1765–1822), Norwegian director general in Stockholm and acting state secretary to the Council of State Division in Stockholm
- Olaf Hagerup (1889–1961), Danish botanist
- Sverre Hagerup Bull (1892–1976), Norwegian banker, composer and writer
- Magnar Wilhelm Hagerup (1973), Norwegian translator, writer and former politician, currently living in Great Britain and writing as M.W. Hagerup.

== See also ==
- Hagerup's Second Cabinet
