= Oluf Tostrup =

Norwegian goldsmith

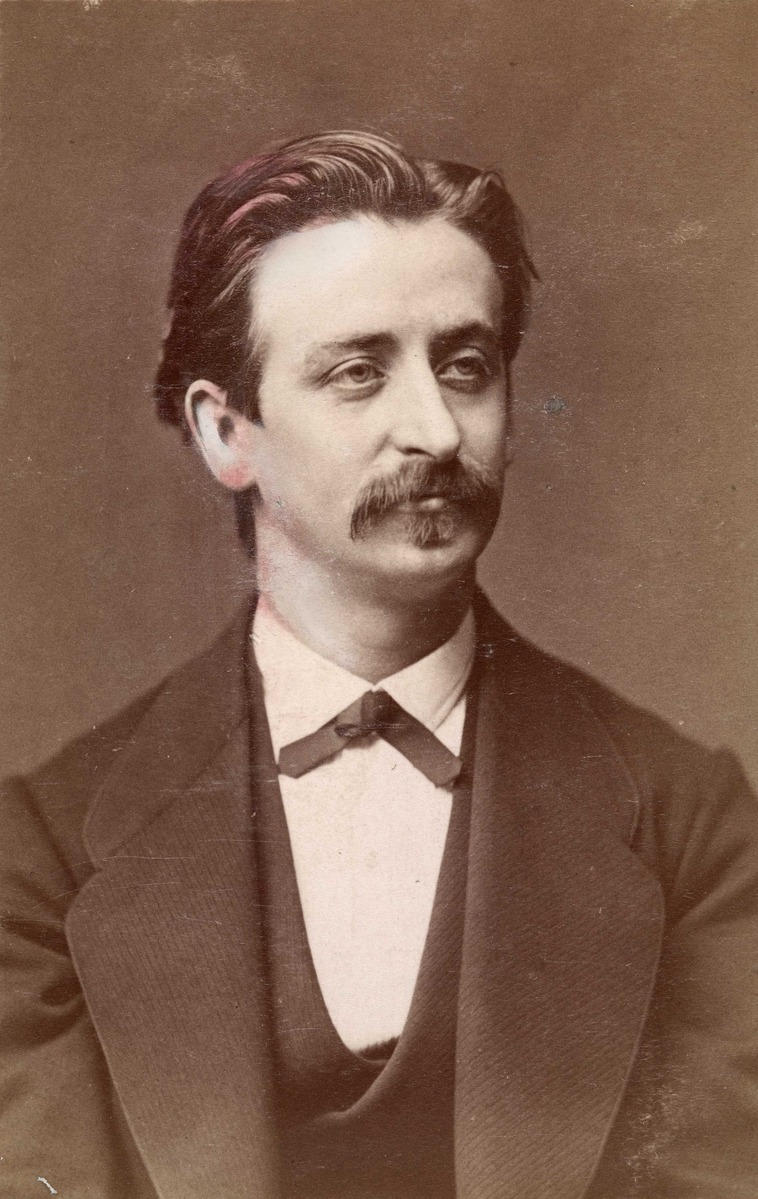
Oluf around 1880

Oluf Tostrup (26 May 1842 – 21 July 1882) was a Norwegian goldsmith.

He was born in Christiania as the son of goldsmith Jacob Tostrup (1806–1890) and his wife Lina Hjorthøy (1821–1890). He was a great-grandson of priest and topographer Hugo Fredrik Hjorthøy and a granduncle of Jakob Tostrup Prytz. He did not marry.

His father was the founder and owner of the notable goldsmith company J. Tostrup. He was thus brought into the goldsmith profession at an early age, and studied in Oslo, Berlin, Paris and Copenhagen between 1858 and 1865. In 1865 he returned to Norway, in 1870 he became a partner in J. Tostrup. Influenced by art industry abroad, he did pioneering work in filigree design, as well as reviving vitreous enamel art in Norway. He also cooperated with architects such as Henrik Thrap-Meyer, Christian Christie and Torolf Prytz in making new designs. He was a co-founder of Norwegian Museum of Decorative Arts and Design in 1876, and was a member of the board of directors for the rest of his life. He donated significant sums to the museum in his will.

He became the sole owner of J. Tostrup in 1881, but suffered an early death in July 1882. After his death, his father took over the company again. At the same time, Torolf Prytz became formally affiliated with J. Tostrup as head designer. Prytz became a co-owner in 1884, and also married Oluf's niece Hilda. When his father died in 1890, Torolf Prytz became the sole owner (until 1938) and carried on the legacy.
