= Grete Prytz Kittelsen =

Norwegian goldsmith, artist, and designer

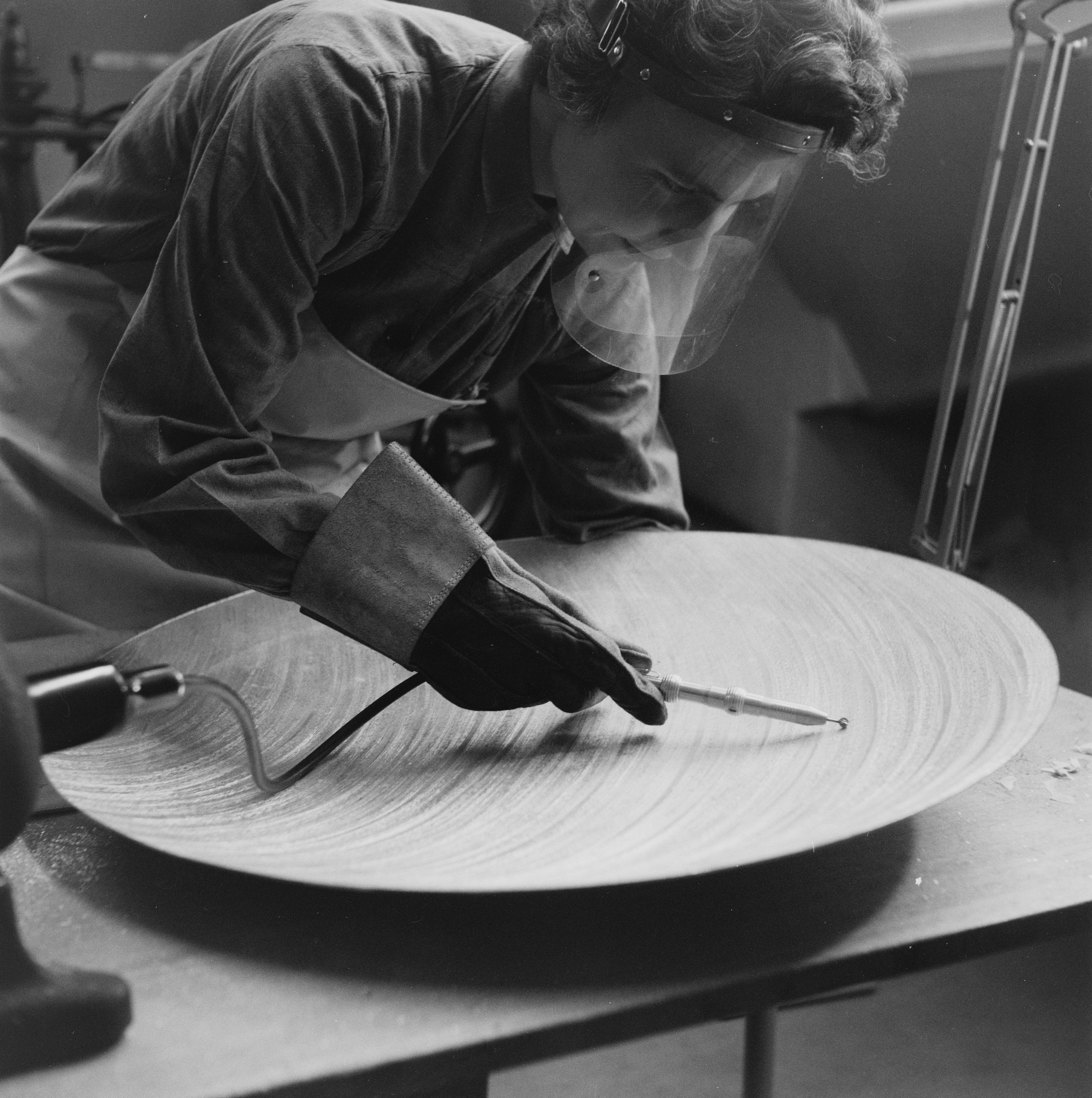
- Born: Adelgunde Margrethe Prytz; June 28, 1917; Oslo, Norway
- Died: September 25, 2010 (aged 93); Oslo, Norway
- Education: Illinois Institute of Technology; Oslo National Academy of the Arts
- Spouse: Arne Korsmo

Grete Prytz Kittelsen (born Adelgunde Margrethe Prytz, June 28, 1917 – September 25, 2010), was a Norwegian goldsmith, enamel artist, and designer. She is one of the most well-known Norwegians in the Scandinavian design movement, and has been referred to as the "Queen of Scandinavian Design". Through her work she contributed to internationalisation, innovation and scientific research. She was one of the few Norwegian practitioners who shaped the Scandinavian design style in the post-war era and is the period's most renowned Norwegian practitioner. Kittelsen's aim was to make beautiful and user-friendly everyday objects available for everyone. She had a vast and varied production. With her enamelled objects and jewellery she was a pioneer in design in the post-war era and a model for the next generation of designers. Today her pieces are design icons and are sought-after collectables.

== Early life ==
Kittelsen was born in 1917 in Kristiania to Ingrid Juel and Jakob Prytz, who was a goldsmith and rector of the Norwegian National Academy of Craft and Art Industry (proper title: The National Academy of Art, Crafts and Design, now Oslo National Academy of the Arts). She was the sister of Torolf Prytz Jr. and they were the fifth generation of the goldsmith firm J. Tostrup. The family was internationally oriented, and the firm had an international profile since its establishment in 1832. The founder of the firm, Jacob Ulrich Holfeldt Tostrup, had studied in Copenhagen and St. Petersburg. His son Oluf Tostrup worked for a rational connection between art, crafts and industry, and was one of the driving forces when the Museum of Applied Art in Oslo was founded in 1876. Her father was director of the family firm, co-founder of Foreningen Brukskunst (The Applied Art Association) and a leading figure in the renewal of Norwegian fine crafts and design in the interwar period. Prytz' and Juel's residence was often home to students and foreign lecturers of the academy, among them Alvar Aalto and Gregor Paulsson. Paulsson formulated the phrase vackrare vardagsvara, which directly translates to 'more beautiful everyday product'. The phrase became a slogan for the Nordic applied arts associations.

After receiving examen artium in 1935, Kittelsen began studying goldsmithing at the National Academy of Art, Crafts and Design. She received her diploma in 1941, after which she worked for J. Tostrup.

In April 1945 she married Arne Korsmo, architect and professor at the Norwegian Institute of Technology. They divorced after 15 years.

During the Second World War she had to flee to Stockholm due to her underground work. There she and her husband, Arne Korsmo, were acquainted with the Danish architects Jørn and Lis Utzon, and they established a lifelong friendship.

== Post-war years ==
After World War II, Kittelsen moved back to Oslo and worked for the family business. She designed numerous works of silver, vitreous enamel and plastic, sometimes collaborating with her husband, Arne Korsmo. Kittelsen pioneered the use of large-scale manufacturing methods utilized by later industrial designers. As recipient of a Fulbright grant, Kittelsen lived in the United States in 1949 and 1950, where she studied at the IIT Institute of Design. Kittelsen and her husband traveled around the US and Mexico and met with other designers and architects, such as Frank Lloyd Wright, Ray and Charles Eames, Ludwig Mies van der Rohe, Walter Gropius, James Prestini, and Edgar Kaufmann Jr., who was the director of the Industrial Design Department at the Museum of Modern Art (MOMA) in New York City. Edgar Kaufmann Jr. had visited Norway a year prior to Kittelson's travels in the US, and was then shown a plate by Kittelsen. The plate was later exhibited in MoMA. Through their travels, Kittelsen and her husband acquired a network consisting of the most prominent practitioners of the time. This made it possible to show the exhibition American Form and to arrange a seminar in industrial design at the National Academy of Art, Crafts and Design with teachers from Illinois Institute of Technology. The seminar was ground-breaking for the renewal of the contents and pedagogical methods of the school.

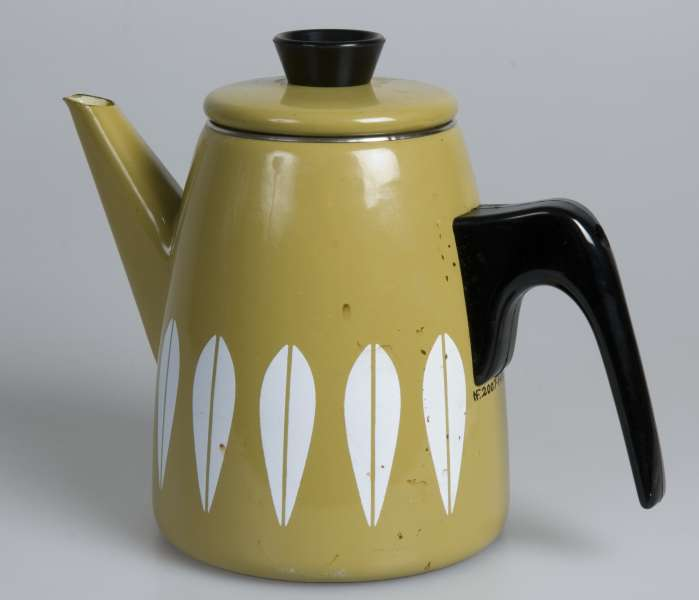
Coffee pot produced at Cathrineholm in Halden, Norway, ca. 1965. Design by Grete Prytz Kittelsen, pattern "Lotus" by Arne Clausen. Diameter 13 cm. Photo Anne-Lise Reinsfelt/Norsk Folkemuseum, NF.2007-0149AB.

From 1954 to 1957 she participated in the "Design in Scandinavia" exhibition, shown in several places in the United States and Canada. Near the end of the 1950s, her products, manufactured by Hadeland Glassverk and Cathrineholms Jernværk, were commonly found in Norwegian homes. 'Sensasjonskasserollen' ('The sensation casserole') was particularly successful, with 150,000 units sold in 1964. Her designs were often inspired by American art, characterized by clear, plain colours and simple shapes. Kittelsen also designed informal, inexpensive jewellery made from silver and vitreous enamel.

Her foreign visits after travelling in the US were mainly linked to participation at exhibitions and conferences, often related to her engagement in the World Crafts Council (WCC), of which she was a co-founder and board member.

In 1971 she married Sverre Loe Kittelsen who died in 2002.

Grete Prytz Kittelsen died at age 93 in Oslo 25 September 2010.

== Works ==
After the Second World War Grete Prytz Kittelsen was commissioned to renew a range of products in the family firm Tostrup, which she did in cooperation with Arne Korsmo. They created several new objects for use in the home that were adapted to new production methods and a more informal lifestyle. An example is the cutlery Korsmo from 1954, which consisted of relatively few parts, and was simple to produce by the help of a few working tools. Additionally, she designed jewellery inspired by abstract art of the same era. Many of them were manufactured in a particularly rational way.

In 1957–1958 in cooperation with Paolo Venini, owner and director of the Venini Glassworks in Murano she developed jewellery in glass and silver that are considered among her most outstanding works.

From the end of the 1950s she worked as a designer for the Cathrineholm factory in Halden. They built up a collection of objects in enamelled steel that became very popular.

In addition, Prytz Kittelsen was active in scientific research. In 1950 she initiated a cooperation between the Central Institute of Industrial Research at the University of Oslo and Hadeland Glassverk in order to develop new, more affordable types of enamel. Her experiments in form, technique and materials constituted a kind of artistic and practical research.

== Impact and honours ==
Kittelsen had grown up with the ideals of the modern design movement, where simple and beautiful everyday objects should be made available to everyone. This, together with a strong technical interest and practical skill, became significant in her work. Both technically and formally, her pieces were characterized by an ability to experiment and a modernity that made them original even in an international setting.

As one of the leading artists of the Scandinavian design movement, Kittelsen received several awards and honours in the 1950s, including the Lunning Prize in 1952. At Kittelsen's initiative, Norway was represented for the first time at the trendsetting Triennale di Milano in 1954. Here she was awarded with a Grand Prix for a large tray in enamelled silver. Later she achieved several awards at the Triennale.

Kittelsen was made a Knight, First Class, of the Royal Norwegian Order of St. Olav in 1986. In 2008 she was honoured with a large exhibition in the National Museum of Art, Architecture and Design, showcasing 360 of her works, accompanied by a book, Grete Prytz Kittelsen: Emalje og design, published by Gyldendal. She was awarded the Prince Eugen Medal the same year.

In 2018 several buildings and auditoriums at Oslo Metropolitan University (OsloMet) were given new names. OsloMet has a tradition of naming their buildings after historical people, and primarily women who have had an impact on one or more of the fields of study at OsloMet. One of the auditoriums at Kjeller campus was given the name Grete Prytz Kittelsens Auditorium, which is located at Karethe Johnsen's house.
