= Erik Harry Johannessen =

Norwegian painter (1902–1980)

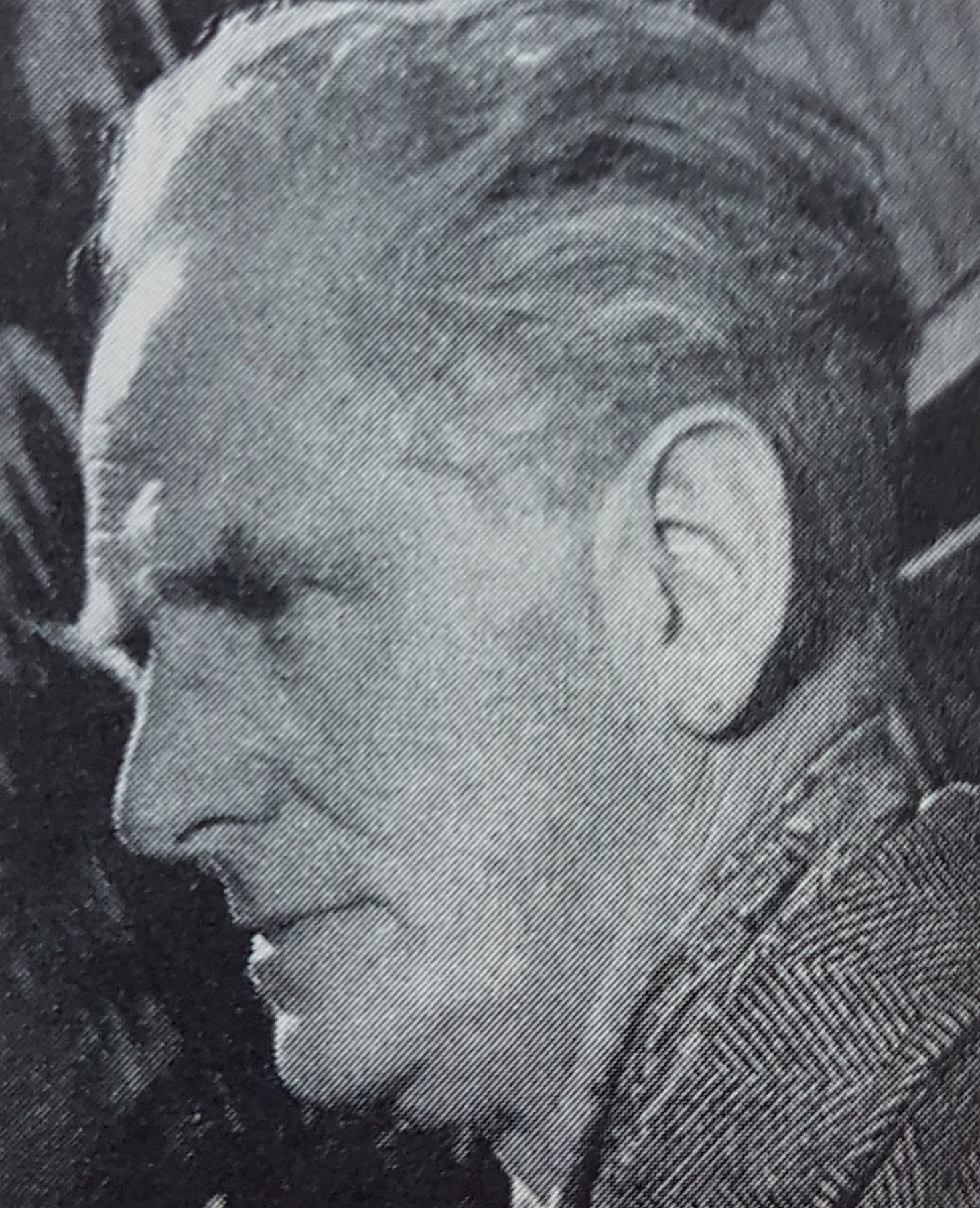
Erik Harry Johannessen

Erik Harry Johannessen (6 January 1902 – 25 December 1980) was a Norwegian painter. He studied at the Norwegian National Academy of Craft and Art Industry from 1924 to 1925, and was influenced by Kai Fjell and Edvard Munch. He belonged to a group of surrealists in the 1930s, and later painted landscapes, crowd pictures and altarpieces. He is represented at the National Gallery of Norway. Many of his paintings from the 1930s were bought by Rolf Stenersen, and are available at the Stenersen Museum.
