= Nils Claus Ihlen =

Norwegian engineer and politician

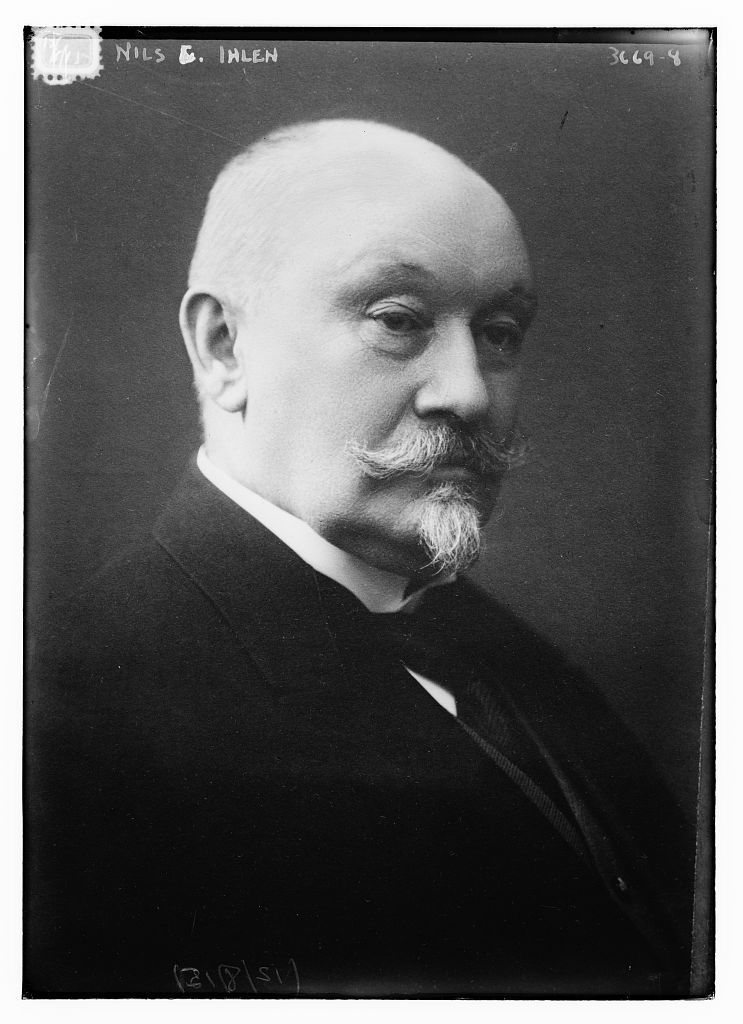

Minister of Foreign Affairs
- In office 31 January 1913 – 21 June 1920
- Prime Minister: Gunnar Knudsen
- Preceded by: Johannes Irgens
- Succeeded by: Christian Michelet

Minister of Industrial Provisioning
- In office 5 July 1918 – 11 July 1918
- Prime Minister: Gunnar Knudsen
- Preceded by: Torolf Prytz
- Succeeded by: Haakon Hauan

Minister of Labour
- In office 19 March 1908 – 2 February 1910
- Prime Minister: Gunnar Knudsen
- Preceded by: Jørgen Brunchorst
- Succeeded by: Bernhard Brænne

Personal details
- Born: 24 July 1855 Skedsmo, Akershus, United Kingdoms of Sweden and Norway
- Died: 22 March 1925 (aged 69) Skedsmo, Akershus, Norway
- Party: Liberal
- Spouse(s): Constance Bruun (1892-1894); Henriette Marie Ihlen (1898-1925)
- Children: 3 sons
- Occupation: Politician; Engineer

Nils Claus Ihlen (24 July 1855 – 22 March 1925) was a Norwegian engineer and politician for the Liberal Party. He served as Foreign Minister of Norway from 1913 to 1920.

== Early life ==
He was born in Skedsmo as the oldest son of Wincentz Thurmann Ihlen (1826–1892) and Birgitte Elisabeth Mørch (1830–1913). He was a first cousin of Christian Ihlen, nephew of Niels Ihlen and of Jacob Thurmann Ihlen, great-grandson of the constitutional founding father Ole Clausen Mørch and brother-in-law of Per Lund.

In August 1892, he was married to actress Constance Bruun, but she died in October 1894. In February 1898, he married a colonel's daughter, Henriette Marie Lund (1870–1962). The couple had several daughters and sons. The sons Nils, Joakim and Alf (Nils was the half-brother of the other two) took over the family business.

Ihlen took his education at the Eidgenössische Technische Hochschule of Zürich and returned to Norway in 1877 to work one year for the Norwegian State Railways. In 1878 he was hired by his father at the iron works Strømmens Værksted (then named W. Ihlen, Strømmen) to work as a manager. In 1883, he took over as owner of the factory. He left in 1908 and left his younger brothers in control.

== Political career ==
Ihlen first entered politics as mayor of Skedsmo Municipality and served from 1989 to 1904 and 1907 to 1910. He was elected to the Parliament of Norway in 1907 and represented the rural constituency of Mellem Romerike.

After one year l, he was appointed Minister of Labour in the first cabinet Knudsen. During his tenure, there were several achievements, including the opening of the Rjukan Line and the Bergen Line railways. His seat in Parliament was taken by Martin Løken in 1908 and 1909, and Ihlen was not re-elected in 1910. The first cabinet Knudsen fell in February 1910, but when the second cabinet Knudsen assumed office on 31 January 1913, Ihlen was appointed Minister of Foreign Affairs. He served through the entire World War I during which Norway balanced on a thin line of neutrality. For some days in July 1918, he had also served as Minister of Industrial Provisioning. In June 1920, Ihlen resigned along with the rest of the second cabinet Knudsen and then left national politics.

Ihlen died in 1925 in Kristiania.

== Ihlen Declaration ==
The Ihlen Declaration was a statement made on 22 July 1919 by the Nils Claus on the topic of Denmark's sovereignty over Greenland in which Ihlen declared verbally to the Danish minister that "the plans of the Royal [Danish] Government respecting Danish sovereignty over the whole of Greenland... would be met with no difficulties on the part of Norway". The declaration became an issue when the question was raised whether the statement was binding on Norway. The question eventually went all the way to the Permanent Court of International Justice in the form of the Eastern Greenland Case in 1933.

Political offices
Preceded by Jørgen Brunchorst	Minister of Labour; 1908–1910	Succeeded by Bernhard Cornelius Brænne
Preceded by Johannes Irgens	Norwegian Minister of Foreign Affairs; 1913–1920	Succeeded by Christian Fredrik Michelet
Preceded by Torolf Prytz	Norwegian Minister of Industrial Provisioning; 5 July 1918–11 July 1918	Succeeded by Haakon Hauan
