= Ministry of Industrial Provisioning =

Former government ministry of Norway

The Royal Norwegian Ministry of Industrial Provisioning (Norwegian: Industriforsyningsdepartementet) was a Norwegian ministry that existed from 1917 to 1920.

It was established on 30 April 1917, during the first World War, and ceased to exist on 30 April 1920. Its tasks were transferred to the Ministries of Defence, Finance, Trade and Provisioning.

The heads of the Ministry of Industrial Provisioning were: Torolf Prytz (1917-1918), Nils Ihlen, (1918) and Haakon Hauan (1918-1920).

== Ministers ==
No.	Portrait	Minister	Took office	Left office	Time in office	Party	Cabinet
1	Torolf Prytz	Torolf Prytz (1858–1938)	30 April 1917	5 July 1918	1 year, 66 days	Liberal	Knudsen II
–	Nils Claus Ihlen	Nils Claus Ihlen (1855–1925); Acting	5 July 1918	21 July 1918	16 days	Liberal	Knudsen II
2	Haakon Hauan	Haakon Hauan (1871–1961)	21 July 1918	1 May 1920	1 year, 285 days	Independent	Knudsen II
