= Eiler Hagerup Krog Prytz =

Eiler Hagerup Krog Prytz may refer to:

- Eiler Hagerup Krog Prytz, Sr. (1812–1900), Norwegian bailiff and politician
- Eiler Hagerup Krog Prytz, Jr. (1883–1963), Norwegian goldsmith
