= Ihlen Declaration =

1919 statement on Denmark's sovereignty over Greenland

Erik the Red's Land in Eastern Greenland that was occupied by Norway

The Ihlen Declaration was a statement made on 22 July 1919 by the Norwegian Foreign Minister Nils Claus Ihlen on the topic of Denmark's sovereignty over Greenland. The declaration became an issue when the question was raised whether the statement was binding on Norway. The question eventually went all the way to the Permanent Court of International Justice in the form of the Eastern Greenland Case in 1933.

== The declaration ==
In a meeting on 4 July 1919, Denmark agreed not to object to any claim to Spitsbergen which Norway might submit at an upcoming peace conference if Norway did not oppose the Danish claim at the same conference to the whole of Greenland. At the time, Norway occupied certain parts of Eastern Greenland.

In response, Ihlen made the declaration verbally on 22 July 1919 that "the plans of the Royal [Danish] Government respecting Danish sovereignty over the whole of Greenland... would be met with no difficulties on the part of Norway".

== Eastern Greenland Case ==
However, Norway continued to occupy Eastern Greenland into the 1930s. That led Denmark and Norway to agree to take the case to the Permanent Court of International Justice in 1933, and led to several questions: Are affirmations made by one government to another binding? Was the declaration valid if it was made in violation of Norwegian municipal law Article 46 - invalidity (Article 27 - observance) of the Norwegian Constitution requiring consent by the Norwegian Parliament to enter into a treaty? Should Denmark have known that assent by the Norwegian Parliament was needed to make a treaty?

The Permanent Court of International Justice at The Hague awarded the disputed territory to Denmark. The Court declared that the Ihlen Declaration constituted an unconditional and definitive promise, although only by corroborating it with later statements from the Norwegian government. On one hand,

Denmark relied upon the Ihlen declaration as a recognition by Norway of an existing Danish sovereignty in Greenland. The Court did not accept this contention, stating that

A careful examination of the words used and of the circumstances in which they were used, as well as of the subsequent developments, shows that M. Ihlen cannot have meant to be giving then and there a definite recognition of Danish sovereignty over Greenland and shows also that he cannot have been understood by the Danish Government at the time as having done so.

On the other hand, the Court held that subsequent declarations from the Norwegian side did relinquish any contest to Denmark's sovereignty claims, namely

[201] The Court is unable to read into the words of the Ihlen declaration "in the settlement of this question" (i.e. the Greenland question) a condition which would render the promise to refrain from making any difficulties inoperative should a settlement not be reached. The promise was unconditional and definitive. It was so understood by the Norwegian Minister for Foreign Affairs when he told the Danish Minister at Christiania - on November 7th, 1919, that "it was a pleasure to Norway to recognize Danish sovereignty over Greenland" (dispatch from the Danish Minister at Christiania to the Danish Minister for Foreign Affairs of November 8th, 1919).

The decision was accepted by both countries.
