= Martin Løken =

Norwegian politician

Martin Løken (26 June 1863 – 22 April 1942) was a Norwegian politician for the Liberal Party.

He served as a deputy representative to the Norwegian Parliament during the term 1907–1909. In 1908 and 1909 he took a regular seat, covering for Nils Claus Ihlen who was a member of the first cabinet Knudsen.

On the local level he was a member of Ullensaker municipal council from 1896, and served as mayor from 1901 to 1907.

He worked as a farmer in Ullensaker. In addition he served on local public committees, chairing the school board from 1910 to 1911.
