= Jacob Tostrup =

Norwegian jeweler, goldsmith, and silversmith

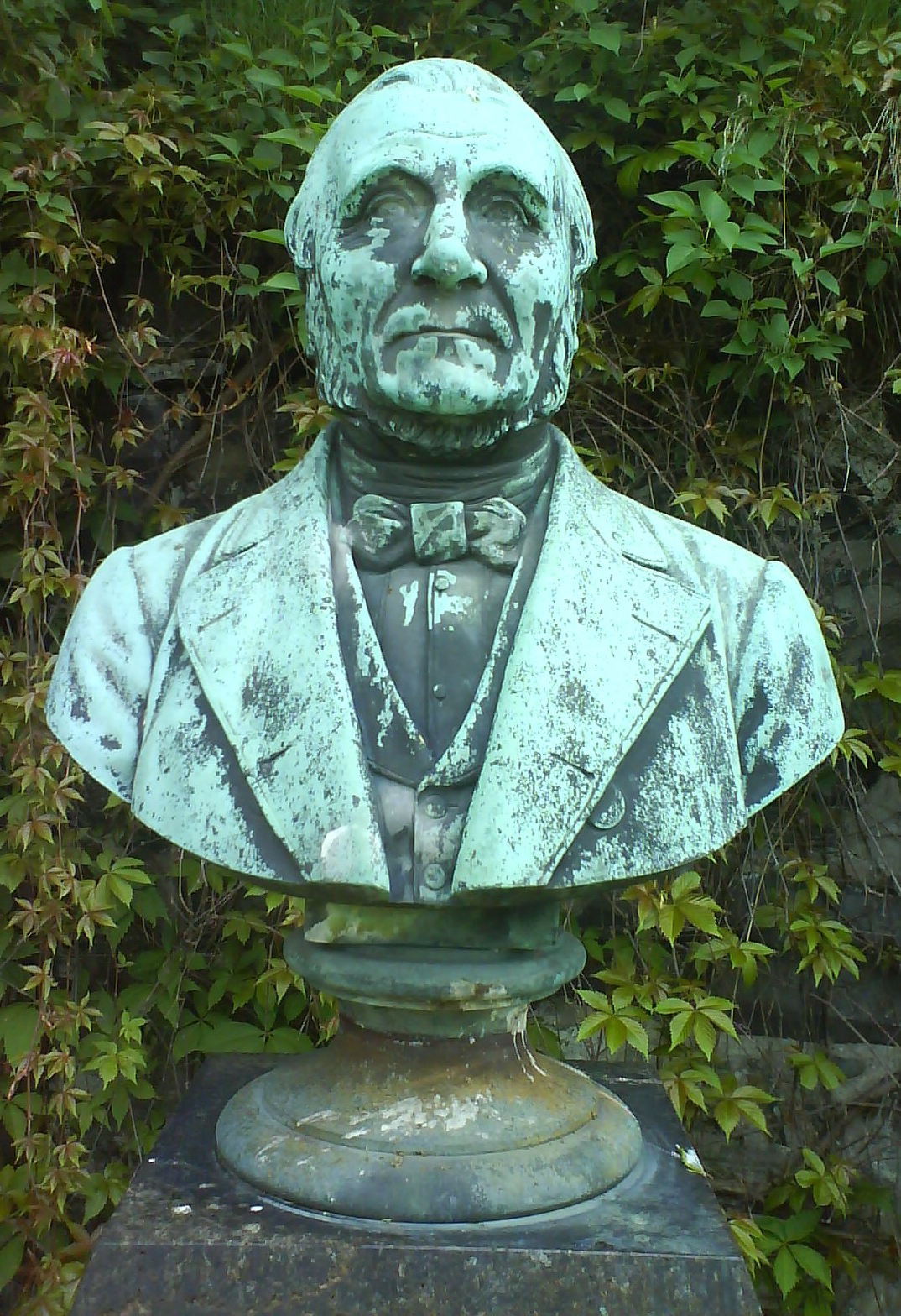
Jacob Ulrich Holfeldt Tostrup

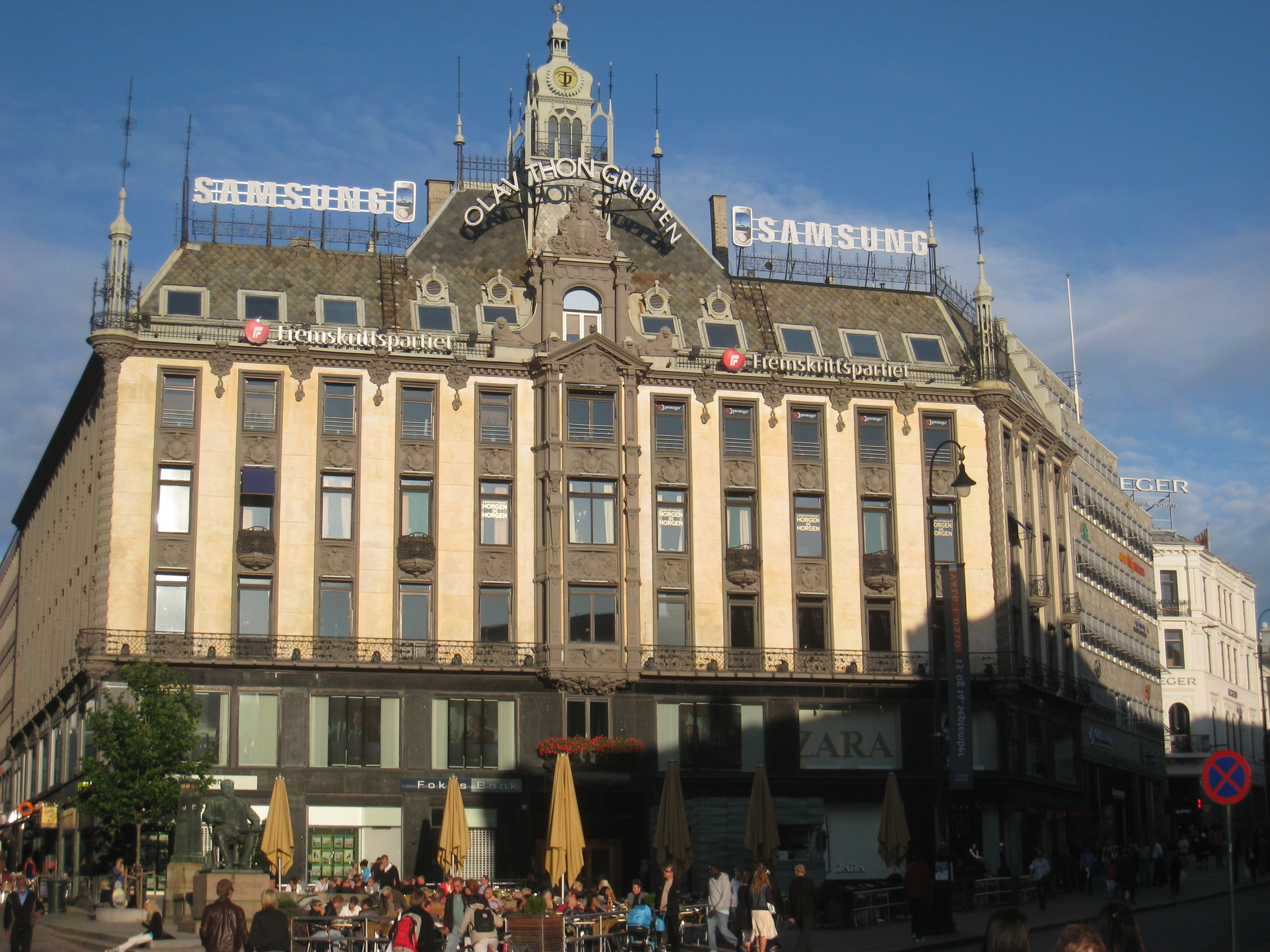
Tostrupgården at Karl Johans gate

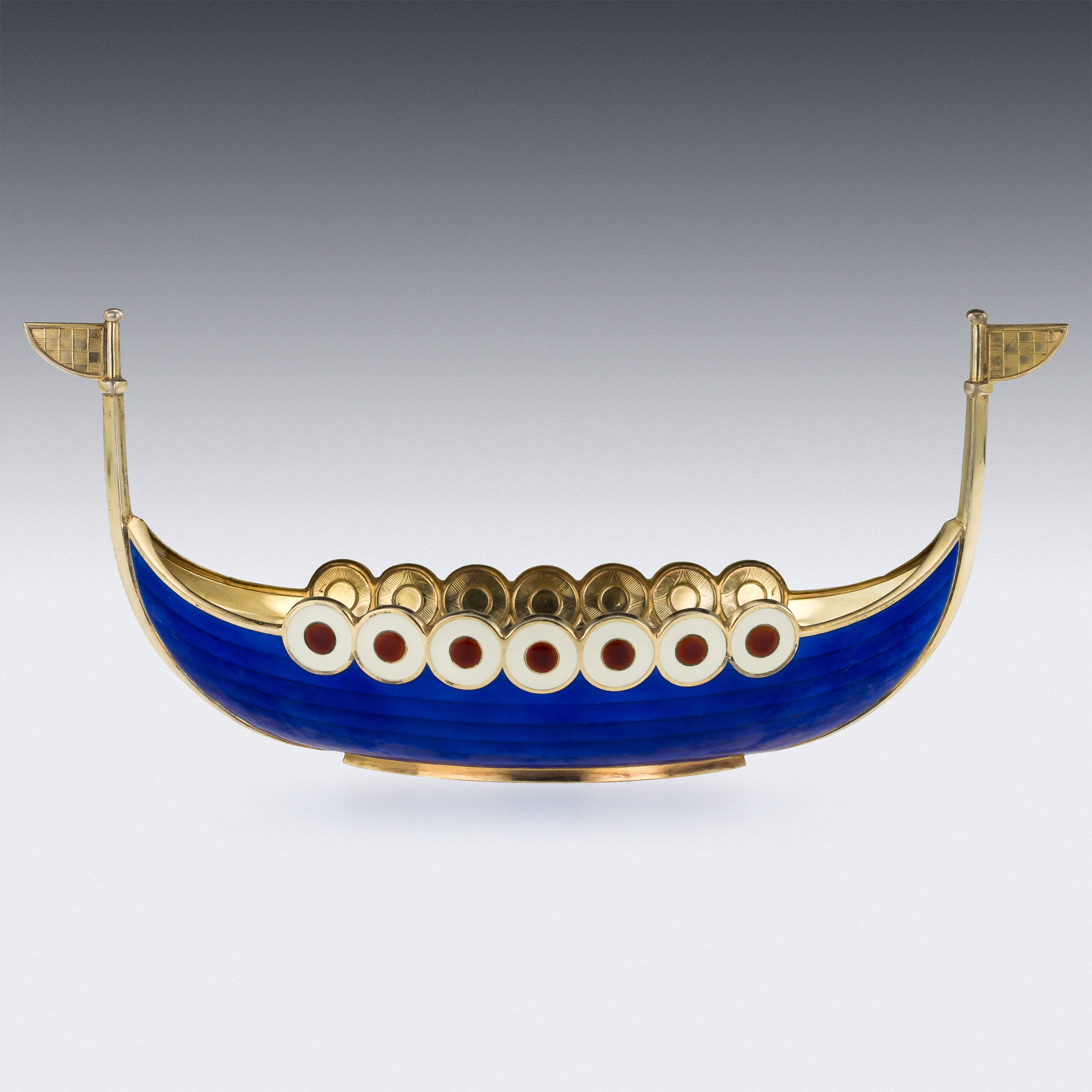
A silver & enamel viking longship.

Jacob Ulrich Holfeldt Tostrup (1 July 1806 – 31 January 1890) was a Norwegian jeweler, goldsmith and silversmith.

== Biography ==
Tostrup was born at Hjelmeland, in Rogaland county, Norway. He was the son of infantry captain Nicolay Tostrup (1768–1858) and his wife Thale Margrethe Resen Holfeldt (1779–1860). He was born into a family with eight siblings.

Around 13 years of age, he worked for a local silversmith. He started as a goldsmith apprentice in Bergen between 1823 and 1828. He then had short stays in St. Petersburg and Copenhagen. He received his journeyman's certificate in 1828. He then moved to Christiania (now Oslo) and acquired burghership in 1832. In 1832, he founded the jewelers firm J. Tostrup, gradually expanding his business with more production equipment and better localities.

Tostrup held several positions in the goldsmith's guild and artisan associations. His firm made the original enameled insignia for the Order of St. Olav, when the order was established in 1848 and later in 1883 it was put in charge of the whole production. J. Tostrup received the title royal court jeweler, and Jacob Tostrup received the Norwegian King's Medal of Merit in gold (Kongens fortjenstmedalje) and was appointed a Knight of the Royal Norwegian Order of St. Olav for his work as a goldsmith.

== Personal life ==
In February 1839 he married Lina Hjorthøy (1821–1890), a granddaughter of priest and topographer Hugo Fredrik Hjorthøy. They had five children. Their son Oluf Tostrup became involved in the company, but died in 1882. Instead Tostrup took on his granddaughter's husband Torolf Prytz as a partner in 1884. Torolf Prytz became owner of the store after Jacob Tostrup's death. Prytz, a skilled architect, was one of the designers behind the new store, Tostrup Yard (Tostrupgården), built 1893–1898 at Karl Johans gate 25, next to the Norwegian Parliament.

Torolf Prytz' son, and Jacob Tostrup's great-grandson, Jakob Tostrup Prytz (1886–1962) also became a notable jewelry designer and goldsmith.

== Other sources ==
- Finne-Grønn, Stian Herlofsen. Familien Tostrup fra Lister (Christiania, 1897).
- Kielland, T. Om gullsmedkunst i hundre år. J. Tostrup 1832–1932 (1932).
