= Arne Korsmo =

Norwegian architect

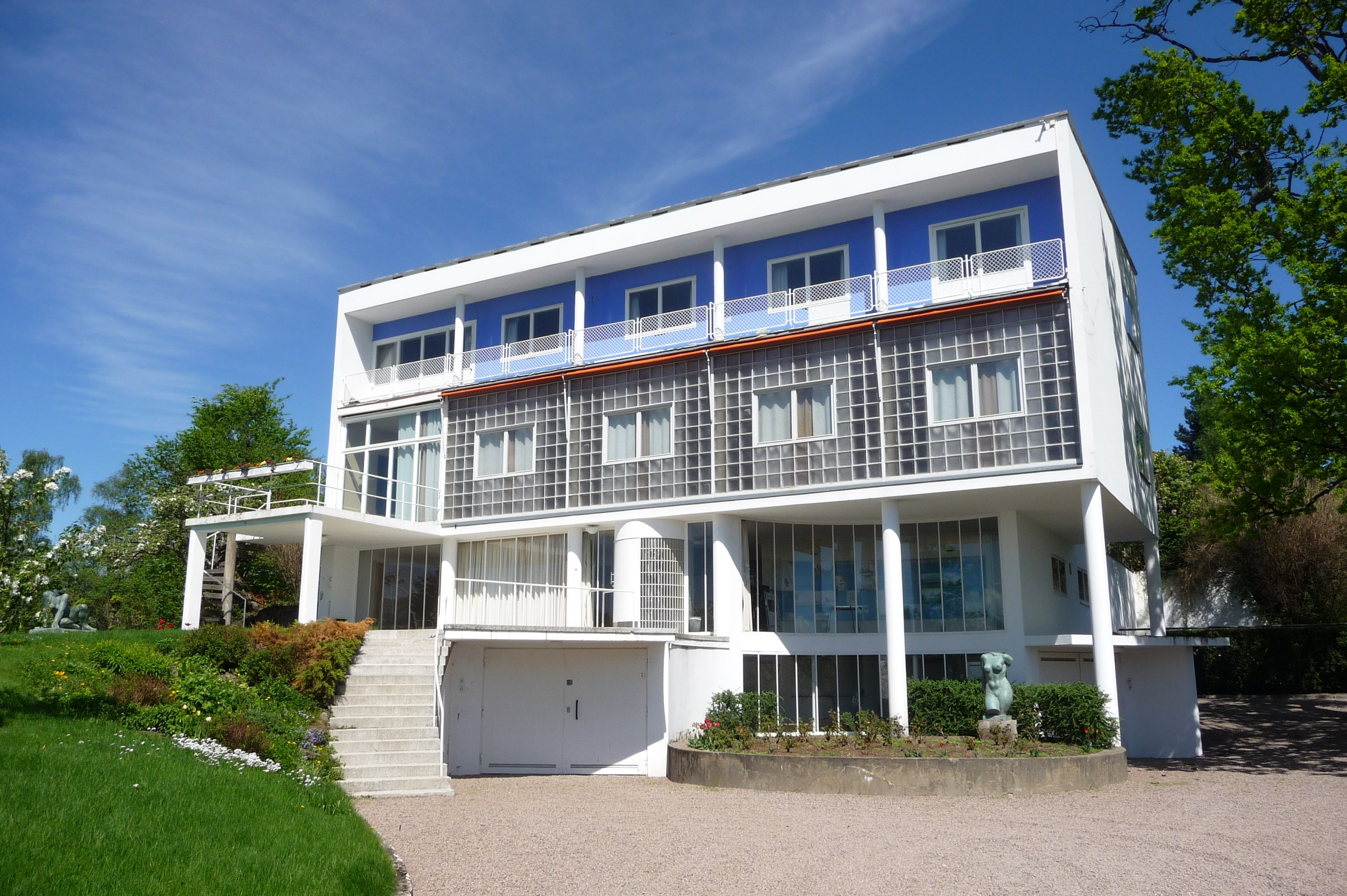
Villa Stenersen, Tuengen allé 10C, Oslo

Arne Korsmo (14 August 1900 – 29 August 1968) was a leading architect in Norway and a propagator of the international architectural style. He taught at the Norwegian National Academy of Craft and Art Industry and he was a professor at the Department of Architecture at the Norwegian Institute of Technology.

== Biography ==
Arne Korsmo grew up in Oslo and took his final exams during 1920. He earned a diploma from the architectural line of the Norwegian Institute of Technology in 1926. He practiced with some of Oslo's leading architects including Arnstein Arneberg and Magnus Poulsson. During 1926–27, Korsmo worked at the architectural office of Finn Bryn and Johan Ellefsen, where he first came into contact with modernism. In 1928, Korsmo started his own practice with architect Sverre Aasland (1899–1989). Several of his villas were designed and built in the years while he was in partnership with Sverre Aasland. Korsmo drew plans for 50 villas, several of which are regarded as masterpieces of Norwegian functionalism. Villa Stenersen, designed from 1937 to 1939 for the financier and art collector Rolf Stenersen, is one of Korsmo’s most well-known works.

From 1935, Korsmo lectured at the Norwegian National Academy of Craft and Art Industry in Oslo and was professor at the Norwegian Institute of Technology. At the same time he worked as an architect and designer, often with his second wife, designer Grete Prytz Kittelsen. Among his central mission was Norway's pavilion at the Exposition Internationale des Arts et Techniques dans la Vie Moderne (1937) and arranging Norway's participation in Milan X Triennale (1954). Among the young architects who worked in Korsmo's office during 1939 was American architect Robert Little (1919–2005) as Little noted in his biography in the American Architects Directory in 1962.

In 1950, Korsmo was asked by Swiss art historian, Sigfried Giedion to lead the Norwegian group of Congrès International d'Architecture Moderne. The group, which was named PAGON (Progressive Architects Group Oslo, Norway), had the goal of implementing and promoting modern architecture. Other central figures in PAGON included Sverre Fehn, Geir Grung, Christian Norberg-Schulz and Håkon Mjelva.

== Honors ==
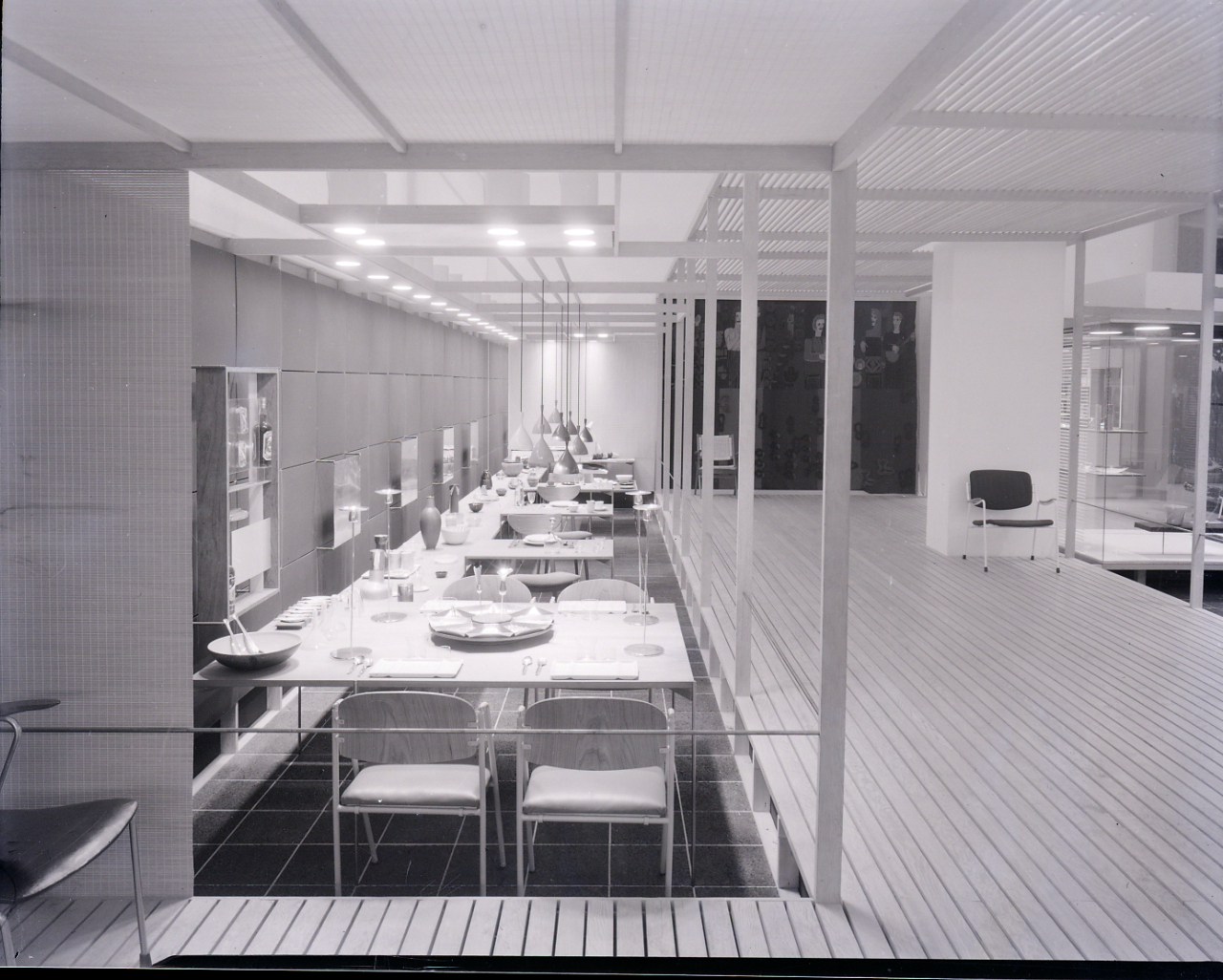
Norweging exhibition at the Triennale in Milan (1954) for which he won the Grand Prix

Arne Korsmo received the Houen Foundation Award in 1937 jointly with architect Sverre Aasland and in 1939 for the Havna allé housing development. In 1939, he was knighted with the French Legion of Honor. At the Triennale in Milan, he won the Grand Prix and a gold medal (1954) and silver medal (1957). He was honored with a memorial exhibition at the Henie-Onstad Art Centre (1972).

== Personal life ==
In April 1945, he married Grete Prytz Kittelsen (1917-2010). They divorced after 15 years.

== Notable works ==
- (1930–32) Havna Allé 1-14 (with Sverre Aasland)
- (1934–35) Villa Riise (with Sverre Aasland)
- (1937–39) Villa Stenersen
- (1929–30) Lille Frøens vei (with Sverre Aasland)
- (1932) Villa Dammann (with Sverre Aasland)
- (1937) Norges paviljong, Paris (with Knut Knutsen and Ole Lind Schistad)
- (1938) Vi Kan-utstillingen (with Knut Knutsen and Andreas Nygaard)
- (1961–63) Britannia Hotel, Trondheim (with Terje Moe)

== Gallery ==
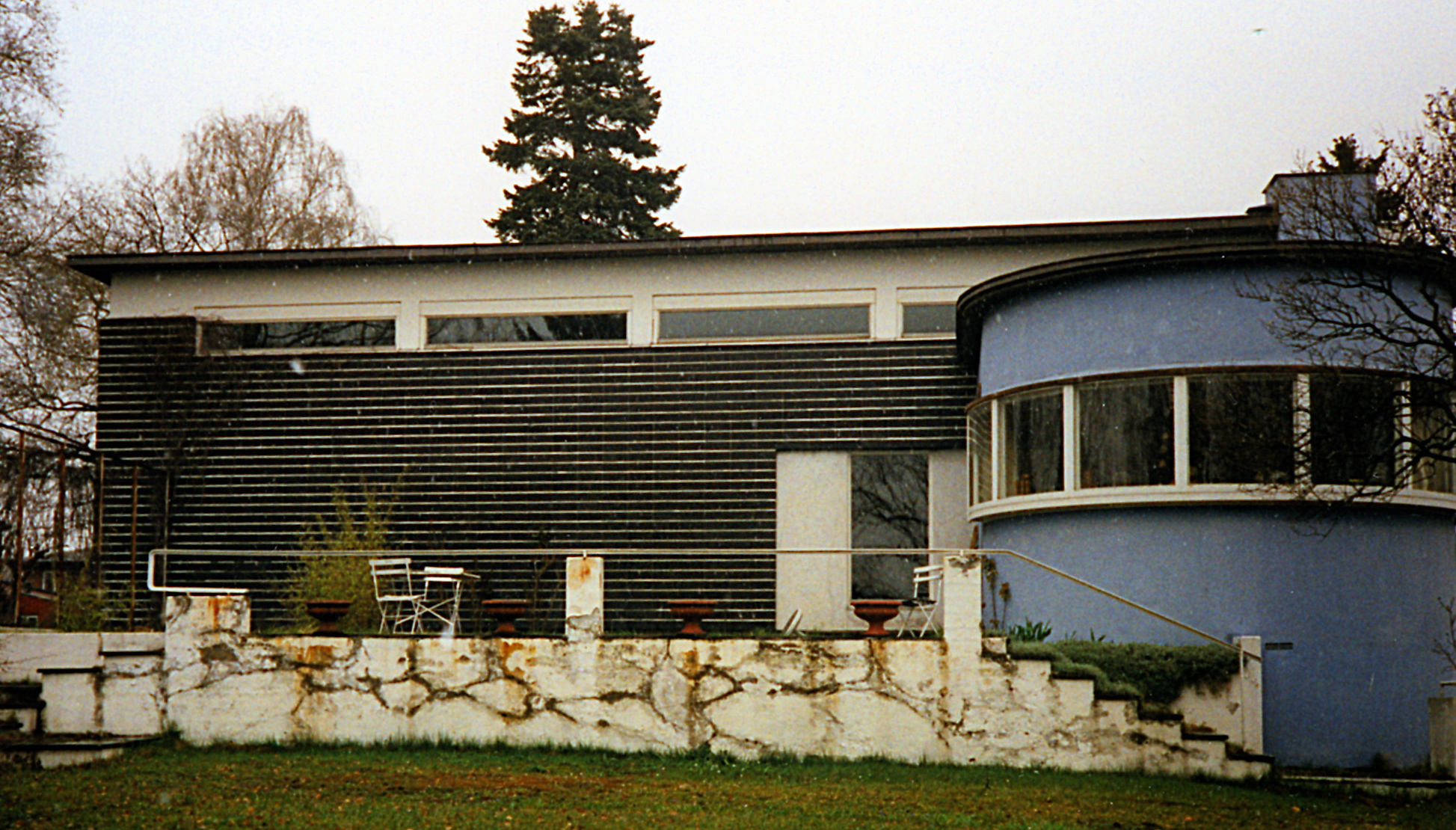
Villa Dammann

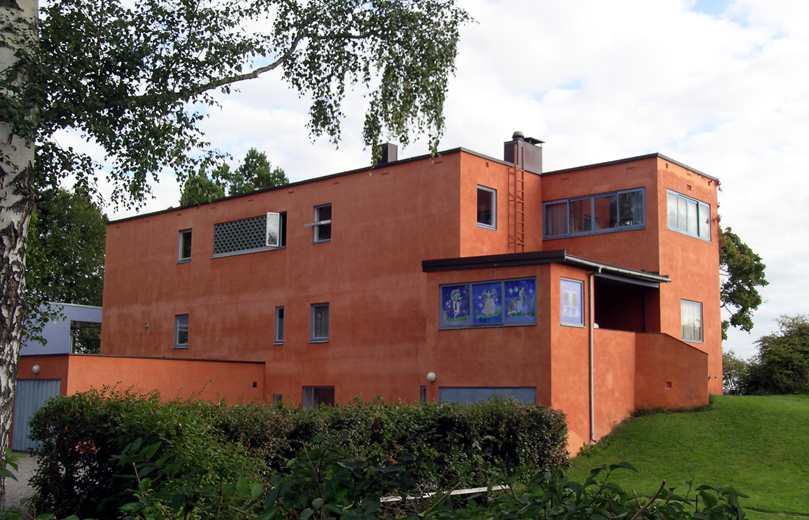
Villa Riise

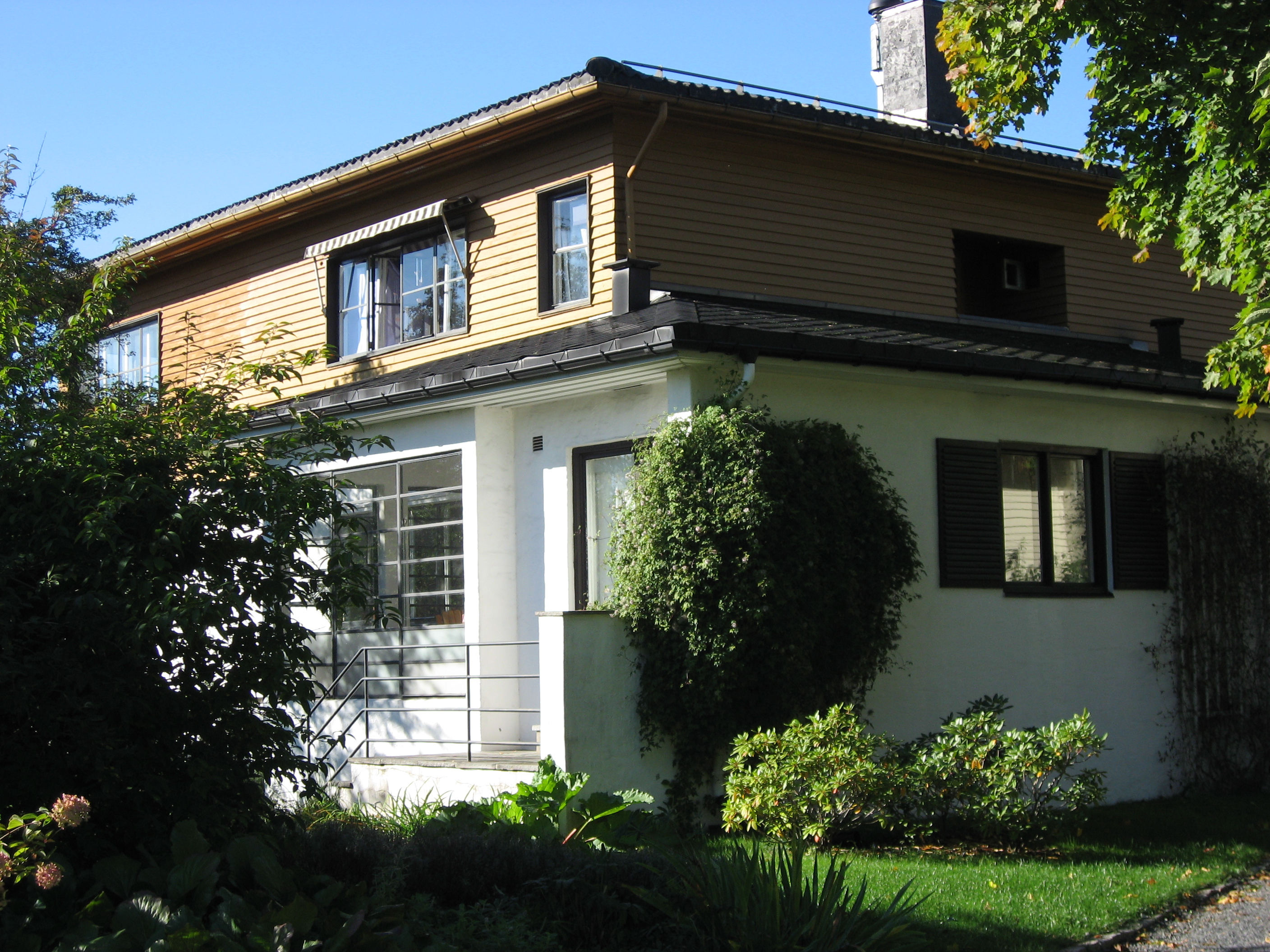
Lille Frøens vei No 16

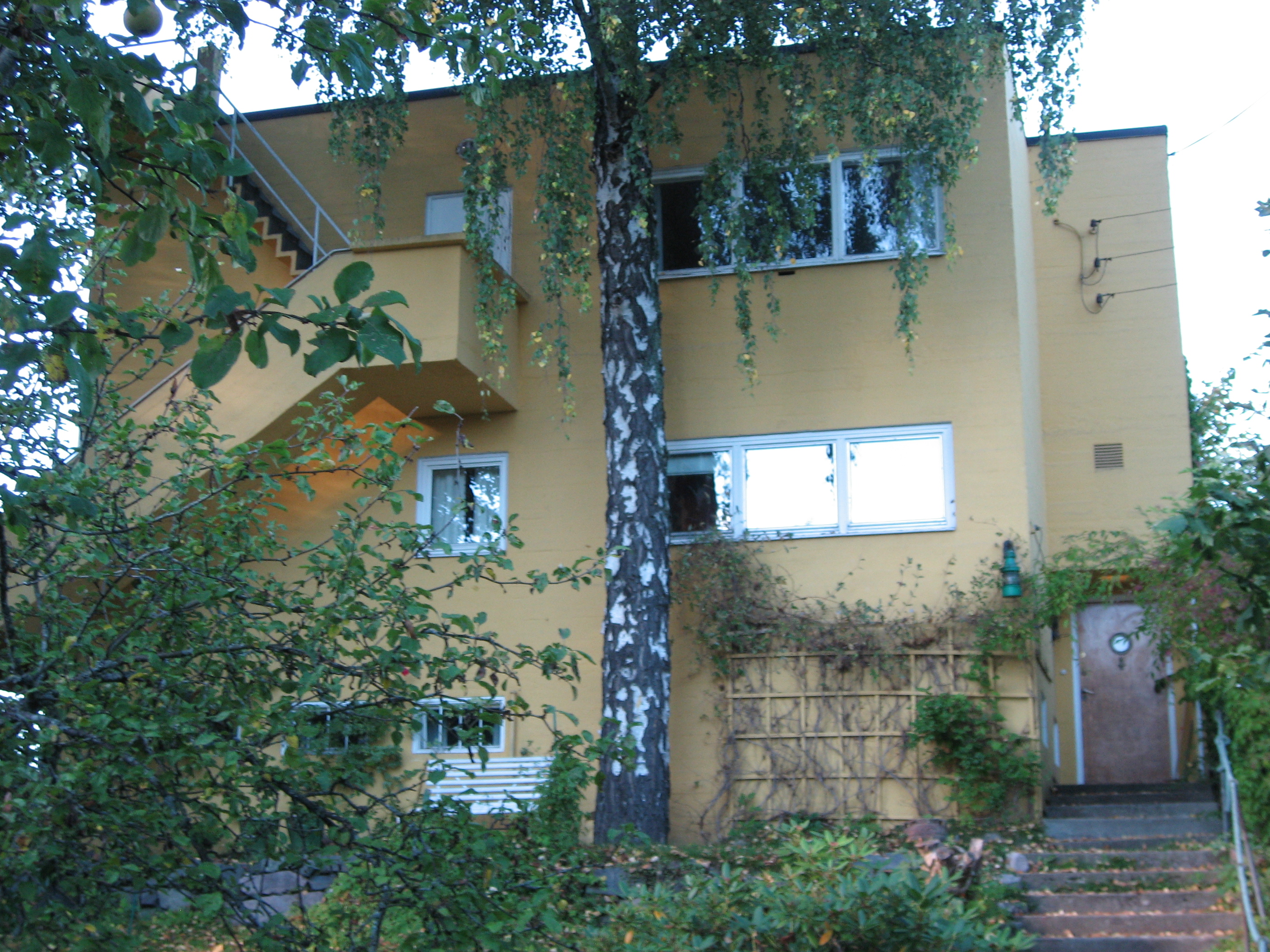
Havna Allé No 9

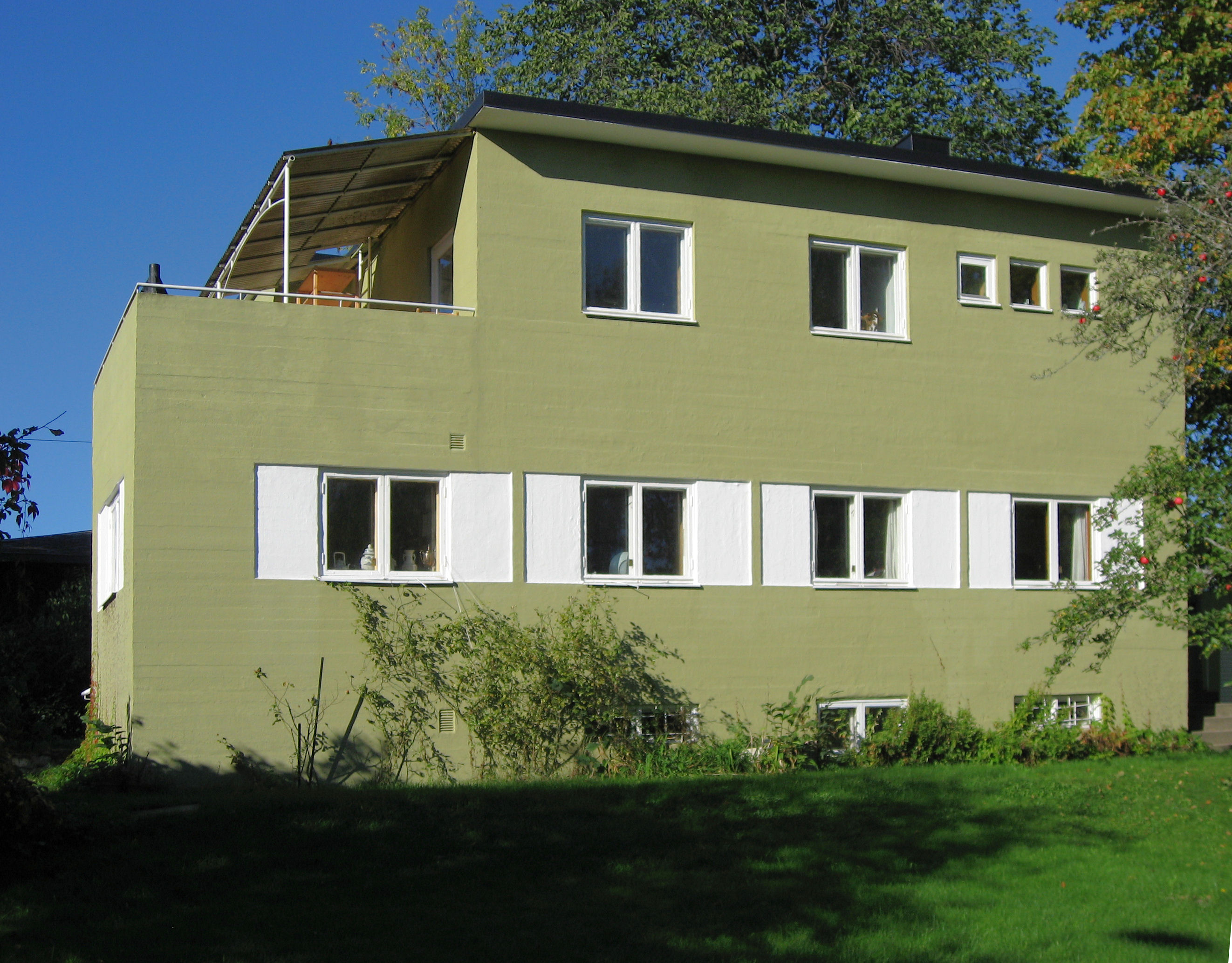
Havna Allé No 11

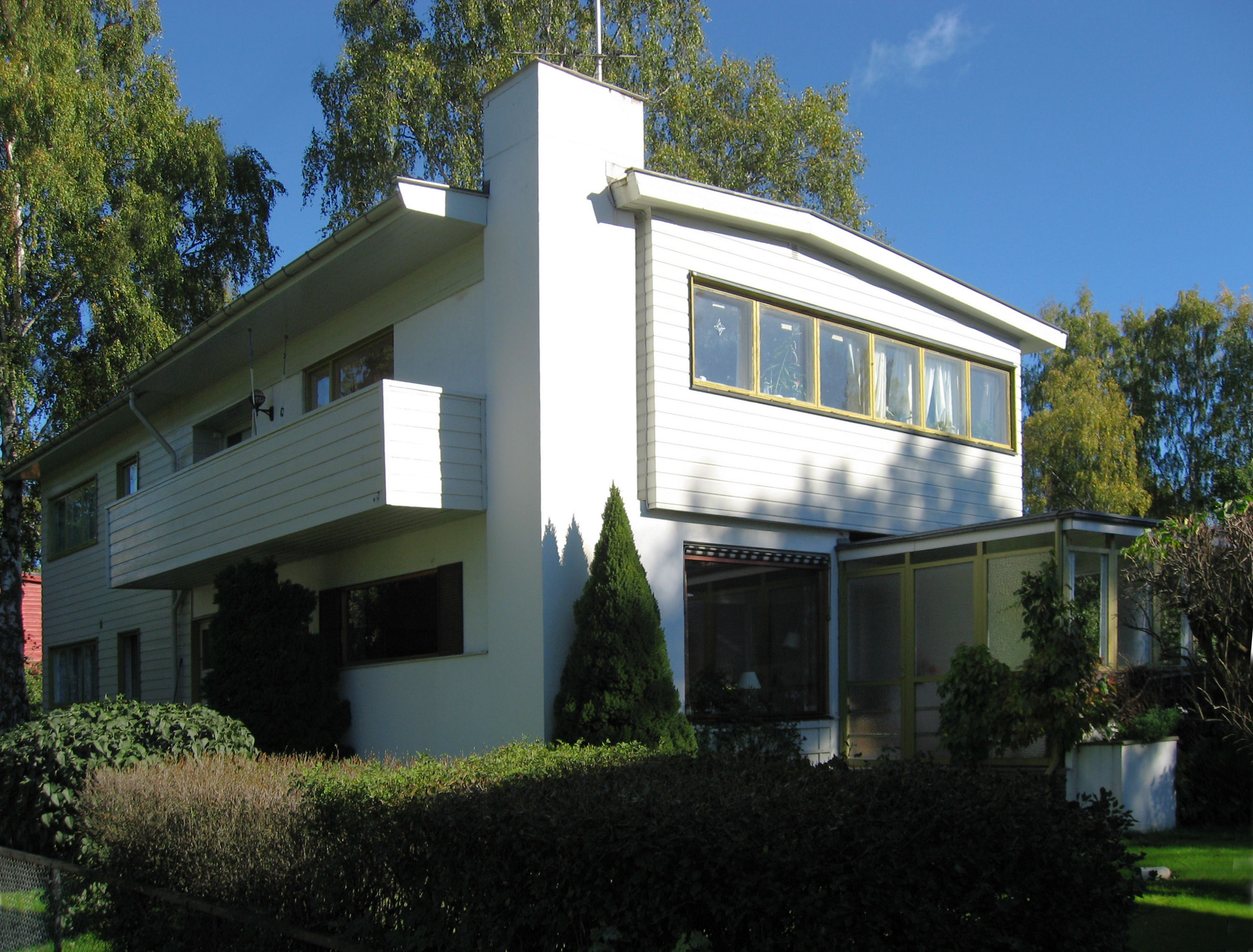
Havna Allé No 12

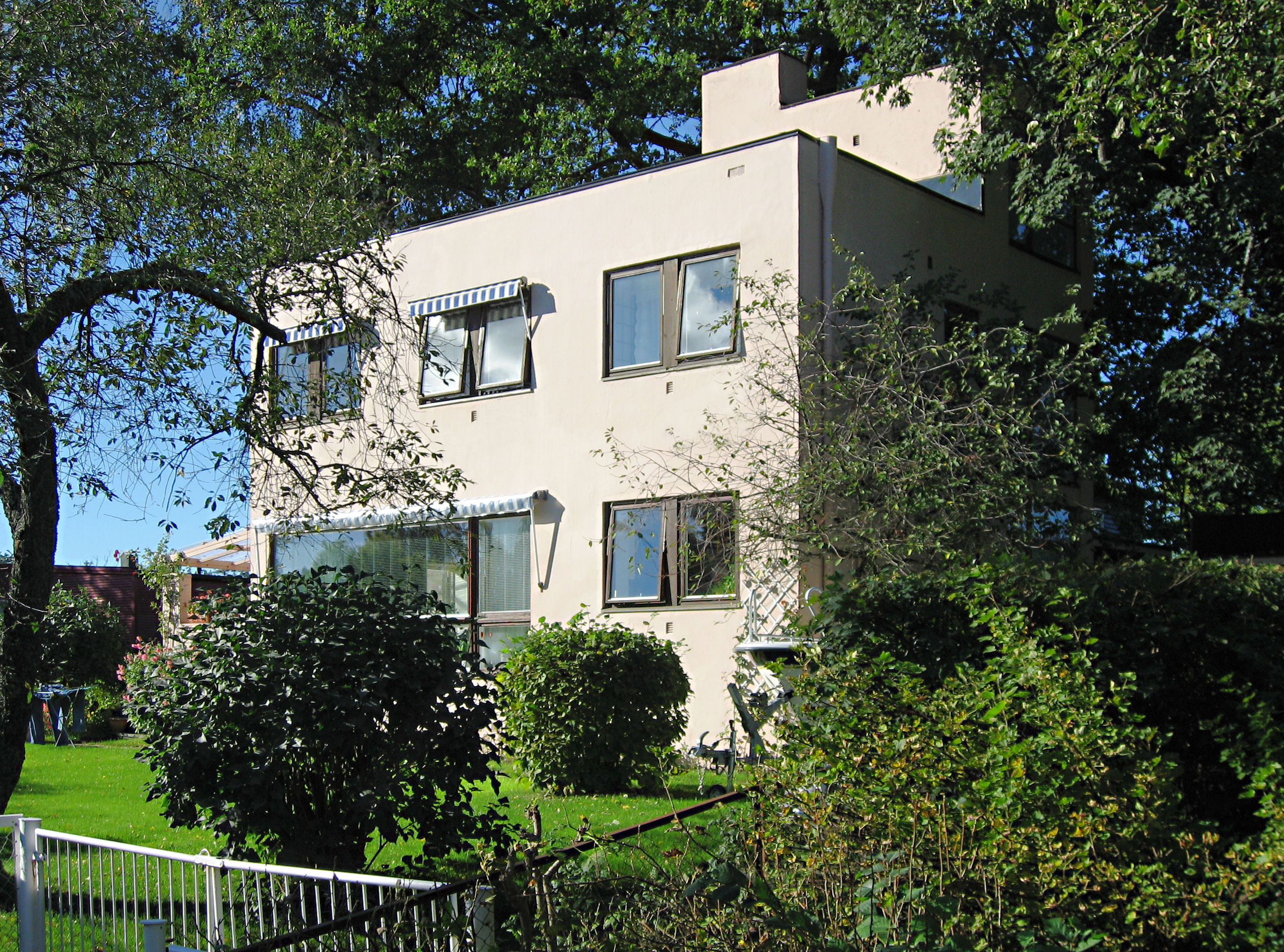
Havna Allé No 13

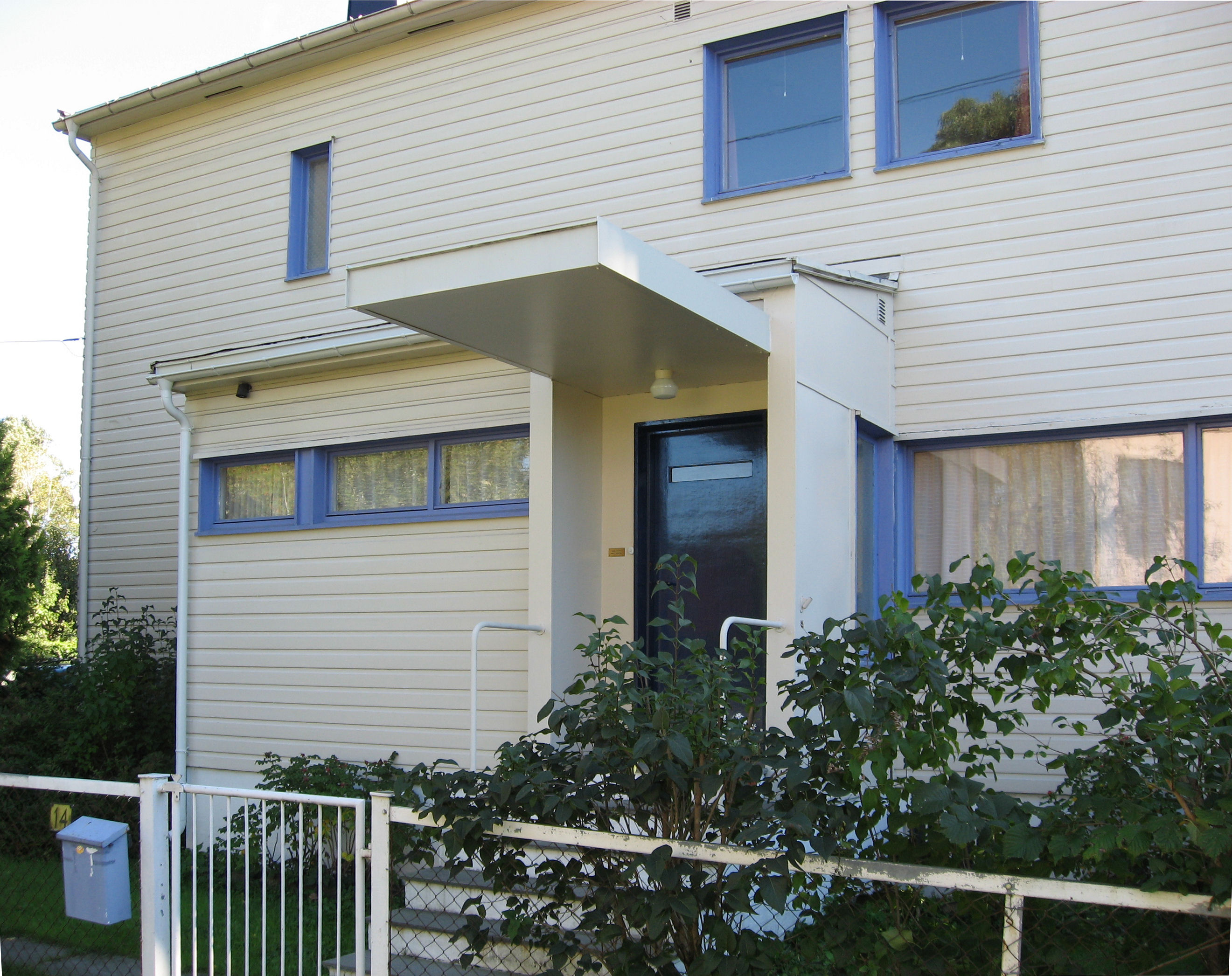
Havna Allé No 14

== Other sources ==
- Norberg-Schulz, Christian The Functionalist Arne Korsmo (Universitetsforlaget. 1986) ISBN 82-00-07128-6
- Brænne, Jon, Bøe, Eirik T., Skjerven, Astrid, Arne Korsmo: arkitektur og design (Universitetsforlaget. 2004) ISBN 82-15-00209-9
