= Carl Frederik Prytz =

Carl Frederik Prytz (23 September 1922 – 5 March 2002) was a Norwegian poet, novelist, essayist, playwright, translator, radio personality and literary critic.

He was born in Aker to civil servant Leonard Christian Prytz and painter Ellen Marie Jensen, and was nephew of goldsmith Eiler Hagerup Krog Prytz, Jr. and Fascist politician Frederik Prytz. He made his literary debut in 1945 with the poetry collection Da senker jeg mine våpen. He was literary critic for the newspaper Aftenposten from 1947 to 1955, and radio presenter for NRK from 1951 to 1955. In 1956 he published the essay collection Tretten norske lyrikere. Among his novels are De vindskeive from 1979, Mannen som hadde rett from 1982, and Skjulestedet from 1984.

== Honours ==
- Lillehammer City grant (1964)
- Oslo City's artist grant (1968)
- Sarpsborgprisen (1977)
