= Eiler Hagerup Krog Prytz Sr. =

Norwegian bailiff and politician

Eiler Hagerup Krog Prytz (30 April 1812 – 12 May 1900) was a Norwegian bailiff and politician.

He was married to Anne Margrethe Thomessen (1820–1900), and was the father of goldsmith and politician Torolf Prytz. He was an uncle of Frederik Prytz and Eiler Hagerup Krog Prytz Jr. and a granduncle of Carl Frederik Prytz.

Like his father, he became a bailiff by occupation. He was also elected to the Norwegian Parliament in 1859, 1862 and 1865, representing Nordlands Amt.
