= Rolf Stenersen =

Norwegian sprinter, businessman and art collector

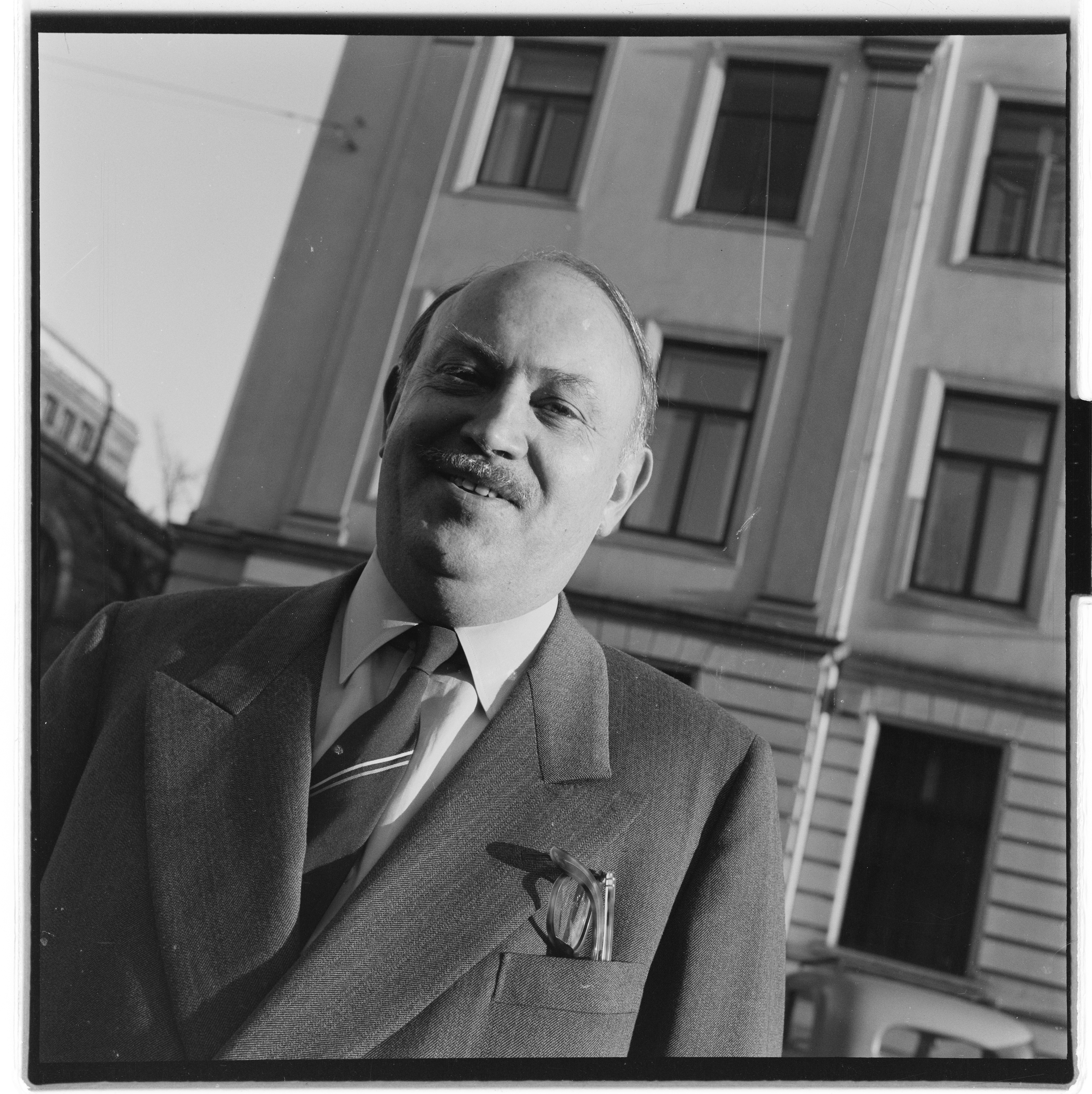
- Born: Rolf Kristian Eckersberg Stenersen; 13 February 1899; Kristiania, Norway
- Died: 15 October 1978 (aged 79)
- Occupations: businessman, non-fiction writer, essayist, novelist, playwright and biographer, track and field athlete and art collector
- Awards: Order of St. Olav; St. Hallvard Medal (1977)

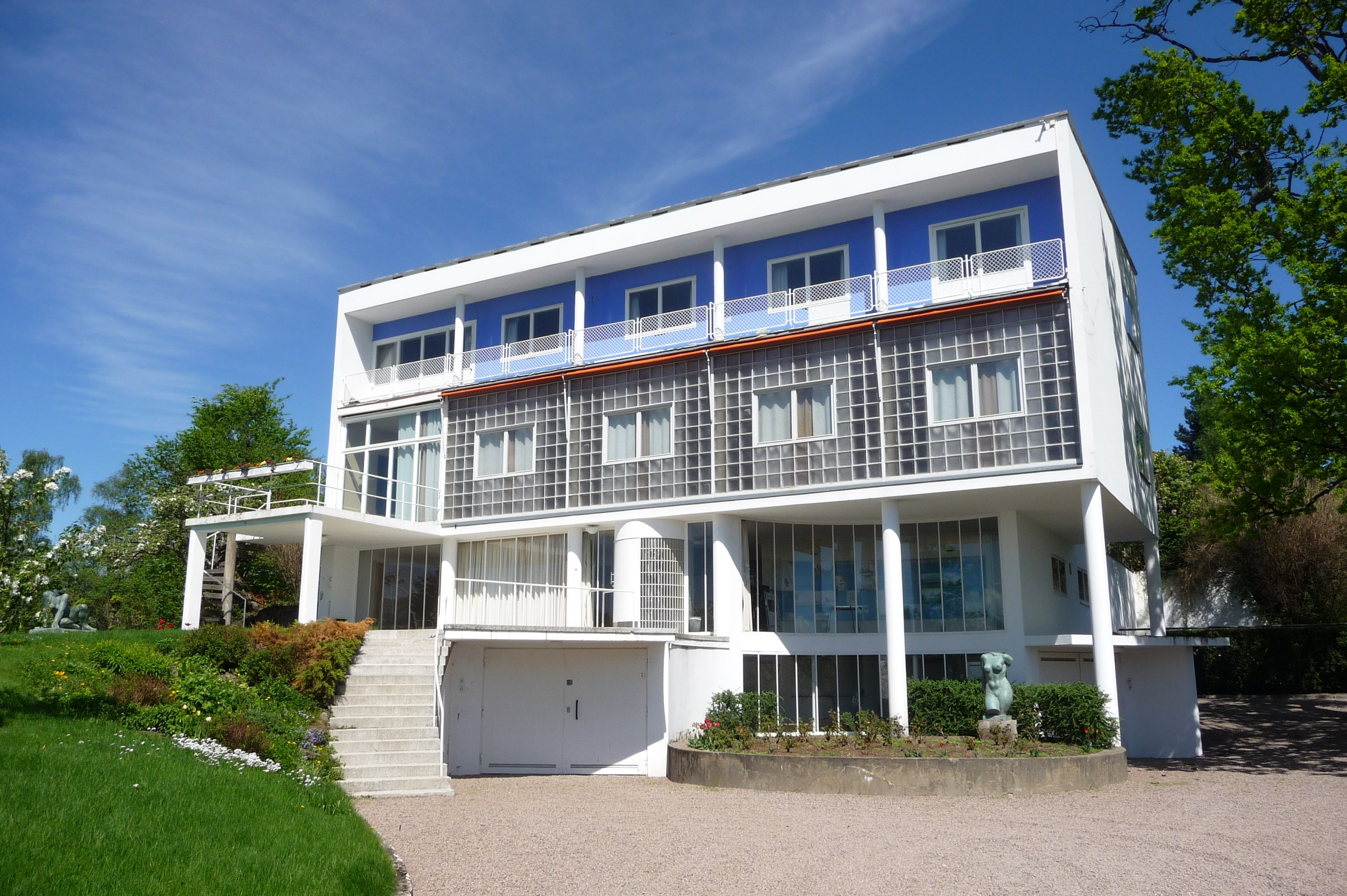
Villa Stenersen, Tuengen allé 10C in Oslo

Rolf Kristian Eckersberg Stenersen (13 February 1899 – 15 October 1978) was a Norwegian businessman, non-fiction writer, essayist, novelist, playwright and biographer. He was also a track and field athlete and art collector.

== Background ==
Stenersen was born in Kristiania (now Oslo), Norway as the son of bookseller Johan Martin Stenersen (1866–1948) and Martha Kathrine Eckersberg (1869–1930). He graduated from Kristiania Commerce School (now Oslo Commerce School) in 1918, and studied at Queen's College, Oxford, from 1922 to 1924.

He was a Norwegian champion in 200 metres in 1919 and 1920, and in 4 x 100 metres relay in 1920. He participated at the 1920 Summer Olympics in Antwerp, where he competed in 100 metres, 200 metres and 4 x 100 metres relay.

== Career ==
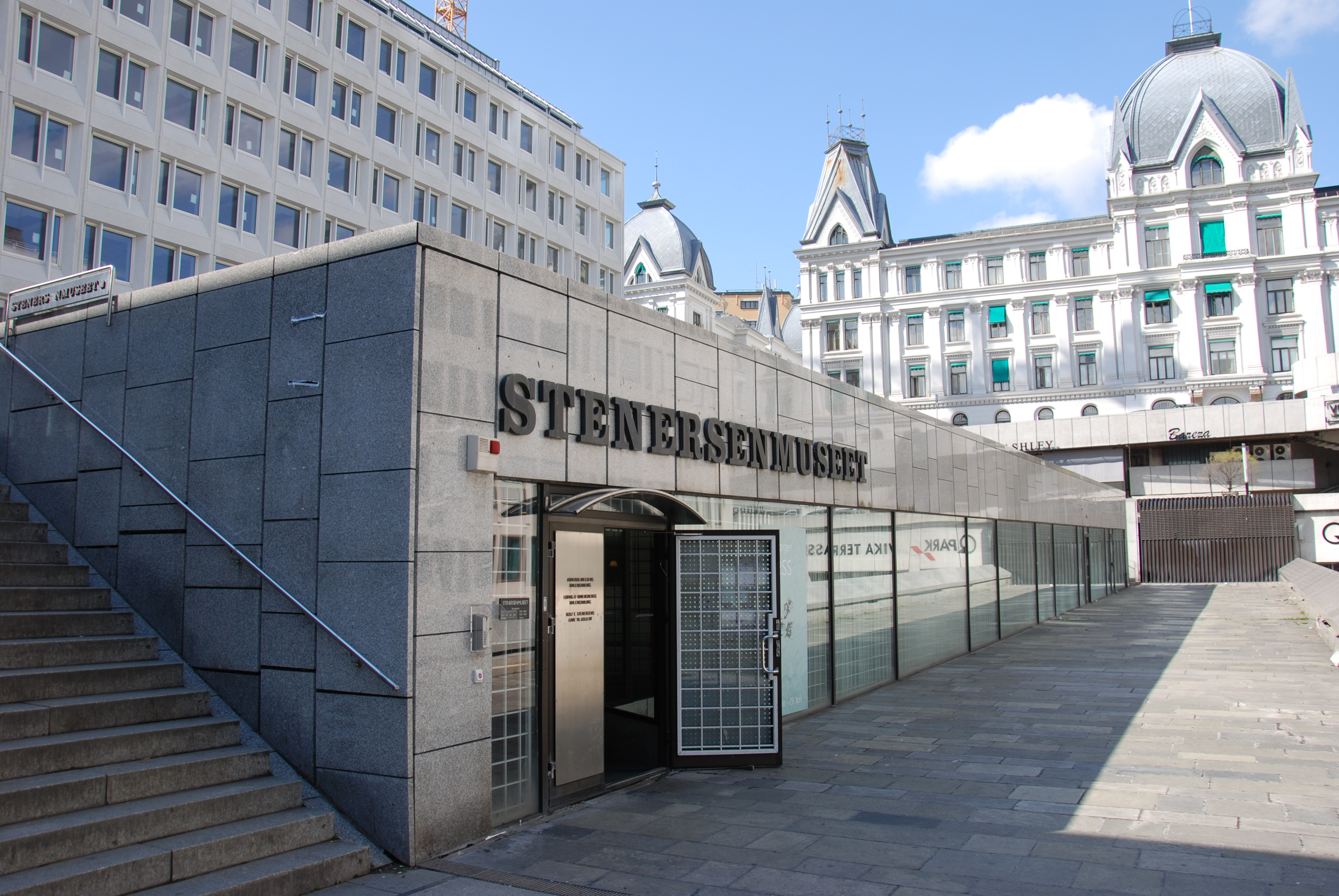
Entrance to the Stenersen Museum

He was active on the stock market already as a teenager. From 1925 he was running his own business, A/S Stenersen og Waage, which operated in the rubber business and the Dutch stock market.

He was a friend of painter Edvard Munch from the 1920s, and came to be Munch's financial advisor. He was also a collector of his art work, and had one of the largest private collections of Munch's works. In 1926 he organized an exhibition of his art collection, which centered around works by Munch and Ludvig Karsten. He wrote essays on artists such as Edvard Munch, Erik Harry Johannessen, Jakob Weidemann and Paul Klee. He published books on economy, including Penger og tall from 1937. His début as a fiction writer was the short story collection Godnatt da du from 1931.

He donated his collection of Norwegian art to the municipality of Aker in 1936. From 1994 the collection has been on display in the Stenersen Museum in Oslo. His books were forbidden by the Nazi regime in 1941, and Stenersen had to flee to Sweden. His biography of Edvard Munch from 1944, translated into several languages, was Stenersen's greatest writing success. His play Eva og Johannes from 1953 was staged at Nationaltheatret by Agnes Mowinckel.

== Personal life ==
In 1924, he married Inger Johanne Martinsen (1900–85). Villa Stenersen was designed as their residence by architect Arne Korsmo (1900-1968). The villa was located at Tuengen allé 10c in the Oslo district of Vestre Aker. An example of architectural functionalism, it was built 1937-1939.

Stenersen was decorated as a Knight, First Class of the Royal Norwegian Order of St. Olav in 1953, and as a Commander in 1974. He received the St. Hallvard Medal in 1977.

Stenersen died at Bergen in 1978 and was buried in the cemetery at Ris Church in Oslo. His collection of foreign art had been donated to the city of Bergen in 1971, and the exhibition was open to the public from 1978. He donated Villa Stenersen to the State of Norway as an official residence. Prime Minister Odvar Nordli lived in the house and the building has later been used for cultural purposes.
