= Stenersen Museum =

Fine arts museum in Oslo, Norway

Coordinates: 59°54′48″N 10°43′45″E

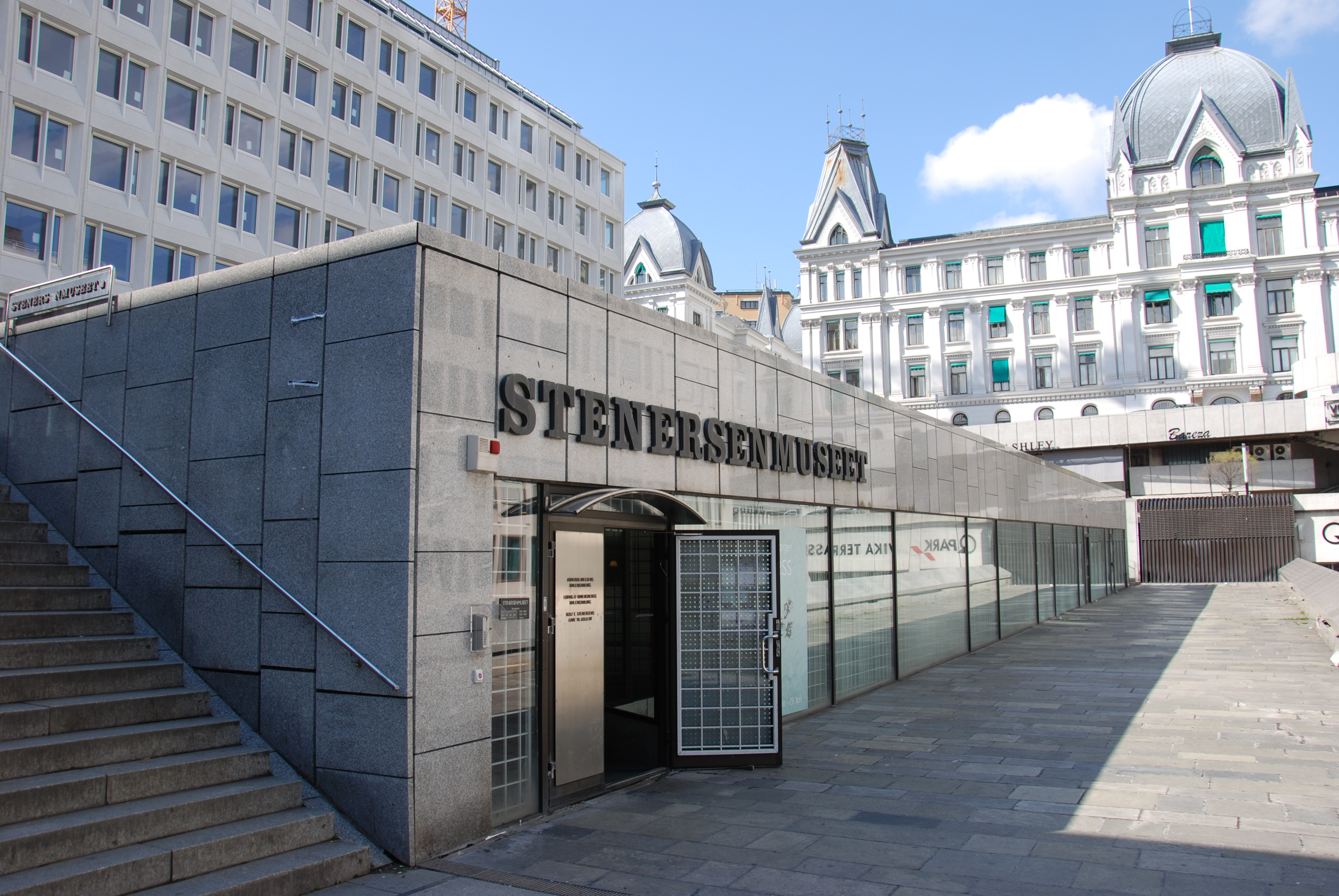
Entrance to the Stenersen Museum

The Stenersen Museum (Norwegian: Stenersenmuseet) is a Museum of Fine Arts located in Oslo, Norway.

Stenersen Museum opened in 1994. It principally features exhibitions of contemporary art. The museum art exhibited originated with three private art collections which were donated to the city.

In 1933, the family of Amaldus Nielsen donated an art collection to the City of Oslo. In 1936, the prominent financier and author Rolf E. Stenersen donated his collection of Norwegian art to the Municipality of Aker, which was later merged with the City of Oslo. In 1972, the Ravensberg collection was donated to the City of Oslo by the widow of artist Ludvig O. Ravensberg (1871–1958).

In 2008, plans were finalized for the Stenersen Museum to relocate to Bjørvika and occupy a new building near the Oslo Opera House together with the Munch Museum.
