= Frederik Prytz =

Norwegian politician

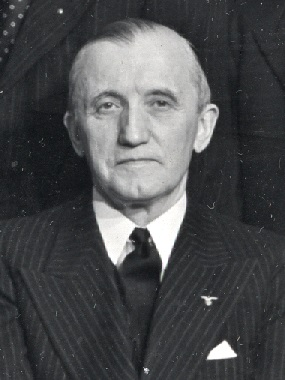
Prytz in 1941

Anton Frederik Winter Jakhelln Prytz (14 February 1878 – 19 February 1945) was a Norwegian politician.

Prytz was born in Oslo. He was minister of finance in the NS government of Vidkun Quisling 1942–1945. Prytz died from cancer before the end of war.

== Early life ==
Frederik Prytz was the son of Frederik Prytz (1853–1937), of Oslo, a minister of religion, and his spouse Milda Dorothea Olsen from Nordland. His grandfather Eiler Hagerup Krog Prytz Sr. (1812–1900) was a Norwegian politician, and Torolf Prytz (1858–1938) a goldsmith, architect, and government minister, was Frederik Prytz's uncle. His Prytz ancestors had been miners in Røros and also had connections to Nordland.

Prytz was the brother of Milda Dorothea Prytz.

=== Russia and the Revolution ===
Frederik Prytz became a close friend of Vidkun Quisling then military attaché during his stay in Russia after the Russian Revolution in 1917, when they were both stationed at the Norwegian legation in Petrograd. Prytz was trade attaché at the legation and became chargé d'affaires in Petrograd when the Norwegian envoy returned home. After the revolution, foreign diplomats were not safe and, among other things, a British military attache was killed. Many countries that closed their legation in Russia transferred responsibility to Norway, which was still represented. In the end, Prytz and Quisling were about the only foreign representatives. Prytz var Quislings overordnete ved legasjonen som ble nedlagt i December 1918. The two may have met earlier while both were officers in Norway. After he settled in Russia, Prytz was annually in Norway and kept in touch with the general staff where Quisling was an aspirant.

He operated forestry in Russia on a large scale, from which he made good money. After the revolution, Prytz had negotiated permission to restart the sawmills in Onega and Arkhangelsk. In 1926, Quisling was assigned to manage the Russio-Norwegian Onega Wood Co.'s office in Moscow. This was the first mixed ownership company created under the new economic policy (NEP). Onega Wood was in 1928 (toward the end of the NEP period) accused of illegal money transactions and Prytz was interrogated and released. Quisling was interrogated for several hours. Prytz then had to surrender Onega Wood to the authorities. In the 1920s he moved back to Norway for good, continued as a businessman and bought Storfosen estate in Trøndelag. Prytz was anti-Bolshevik at the same time that he admired certain aspects of the Russian Revolution. His racist ideas also manifested themselves in skepticism about the West's economic system.

While Prytz and Quisling were in Petrograd together they exchanged ideas about the Nordic race, about the colonization of Russia and about fighting the Bolsheviks. Prytz had a great influence on Quisling, including his thinking about race. Ideas about the Nordic race were widespread among Western Europeans who worked in the Slavic countries, and the slightly older Prytz may have introduced Quisling to such ideas.

The businessman Jonas Lied was working in Russia at the same time as Prytz. According to Marit Werenskiold, Lied did not interact with Prytz, but Lied had some contact with Quisling regarding relations with the Soviet Union when Quisling was a minister in the 1930s.

Hans Fredrik Dahl writes that Lied and Quisling "got on well with each other" and they agreed that the Bolshevik leaders were skilled politicians. Quisling's book on Russia shares views with Prytz's lecture script from 1930. Both regarded the Russians as an inferior race incapable of creating an advanced civilization.

According to Prytz, it was the arrival of the Nordic people that provided the prerequisite for the establishment of a Russian state and claimed that the Russian ruling class had had good Nordic heritage since then. This hereditary substance was, Prytz argued, displaced with the revolution, and the Nordic people would again be able to have a civilizing task in Russia after the revolution's chaos. Prytz's racial theories also included anti-Semitism. From the end of the 1920s, Quisling's thoughts were characterized by ideas about the Nordic race, later Quisling also became anti-Semitic. Quisling took over Prytz's notion of the Russians as an inferior race.

=== National Collection ===
Prytz was on the Oslo Farmers' Party list at the election in 1930. This was an independent department outside the Farmers' Party and included people who were skeptical of the political system in Norway.

Prytz was central to Nasjonal Samling from its establishment in 1933. Johan Bernhard Hjort took the initiative in a letter to Prytz for the party to be established formally. Nordisk Folkereisning came about through a group that met at Prytz's home. Among these were Johan Throne Holst and Herman Harris Aall. Prytz took the initiative for an organization mainly consisting of officers who were to be at the forefront of a race-based foreign policy, a corporative organization of Norway and anti-communist work. In 1933, Prytz moved to his farm near Trondheim and was not very active in NS until the outbreak of war. He kept in touch with Quisling by letter and persuaded him in the autumn of 1939 to go to Berlin. Prytz may have influenced Peder Kolstad to appoint Quisling as defense minister in 1931.

=== World War II ===
During World War II, Frederik Prytz was county in Sør-Trøndelag and head of the Ministry of Finance from 1942 to 1944. In 1943, Prytz Statistics Central Agency initiated the collection of information on the costs of the war for Norway. This was to form the basis for claims for war reparations from Great Britain. Per von Hirsch took over as finance minister when Prytz died. Prytz was a Freemason and in 1940 was told by Quisling to resign. In Quisling's government, he was probably Quisling's closest adviser and was a bitter personal opponent of Hagelin who fronted a nationalist line within the government. Prytz and Finn Støren had plans for Norwegian expansion eastwards in northern Russia and worked for these plans in Berlin in 1941. In July 1941, without Prytz's permission, Hitler had already decided that the Kola Peninsula would be Terboven's responsibility.

Prytz had been appointed by Quisling as finance minister from 9 April, without taking office and without having given his consent. Due to the act of war, Prytz (who was in Trøndelag) became aware of Quisling's proclamation via detours. According to Magne Skodvin, Prytz was skeptical of the Quisling government of 9 April and would rather support a government led by Ragnar Skancke. There was talk of Prytz and Skancke together trying to get to Oslo to contribute to a pro-German government. Prytz was moderate by nature and did not get along well with the outgoing and pro-German Hagelin. As NS-appointed county governor in Trondheim, he surprisingly went against the growing anti-Semitism in NS. As finance minister, he tried to stop the occupying power's draining of Norges Bank. In the autumn of 1944, he tried to get the government to agree to demands for a peace treaty with Germany.

On his deathbed, Prytz received the Grand Cross of the Order of St. Olav from Quisling personally, an award approved only by Quisling. (During the war, Quisling awarded orders with modified insignia, rivalling those granted by King Haakon from his exile in England.)

Prytz died of cancer before the German surrender in 1945, leaving behind a widow and children, and has several descendants. He was buried in Oslo.
