= Haakon Hauan =

Norwegian politician

Haakon Hauan (20 June 1871 – 7 October 1961) was a Norwegian politician for the Liberal Party. He was Minister of Industrial Provisioning 1918–1920. Hauan was an engineer and industrialist by profession, and was instrumental to the development of petroleum trade and petroleum refinement in Norway in the early 20th century.

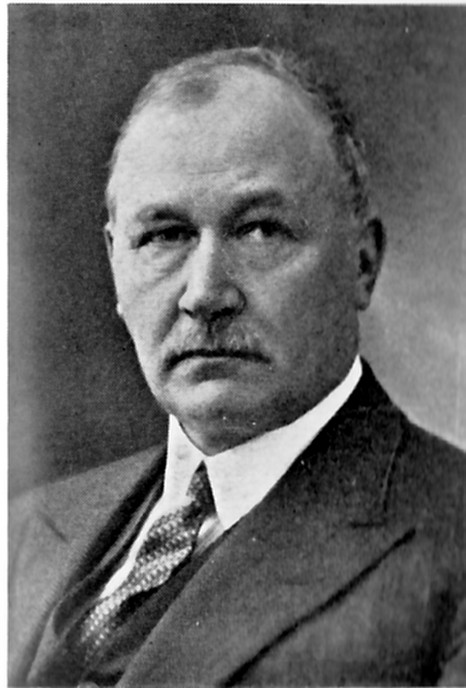
The portrait of Haakon Hauan
