= Jacob Prytz =

Norwegian goldsmith and designer

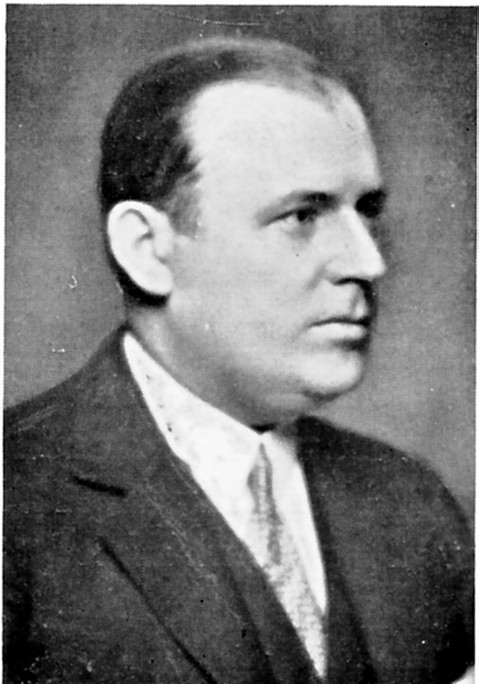
- Born: 12 June 1886; Kristiania, Norway
- Died: 23 November 1962 (aged 76); Oslo
- Occupations: Goldsmith and designer
- Children: Grete Prytz Kittelsen
- Father: Torolf Prytz
- Awards: Order of St. Olav (1931)

Jacob Prytz (12 June 1886 – 23 November 1962) was a Norwegian goldsmith and designer.

== Personal life ==
Prytz was born in Kristiania on 12 June 1886, a son of architect, goldsmith and politician Torolf Prytz and Hilda Tostrup. He married Ingerid Juel in 1912, and they were parents of Grete Prytz Kittelsen.

== Career ==
Prytz studied at the Norwegian National Academy of Craft and Art Industry from 1904 to 1908, and further at the academy in Hanau and at the Beaux-Arts de Paris. From 1913 he was artistic director in the family company J. Tostrup. He designed major parts of the company's collection at the 1914 Jubilee Exhibition, and this exhibition is regarded as his breakthrough as goldsmith.

From 1914 he was assigned as teacher for the goldsmith class at the Norwegian National Academy of Craft and Art Industry. He was appointed director of the academy from 1934 to 1956 (with the title rector from 1945).

He was decorated Knight, First Class of the Order of St. Olav in 1931, and was awarded the Jacob Prize in 1957.

He died in Oslo on 15 November 1986.
