= Eiler Hagerup Krog Prytz Jr. =

Norwegian goldsmith (1883–1963)

Eiler Hagerup Krog Prytz (11 March 1883 – 3 August 1963) was a Norwegian goldsmith.

He was born in Kristiania, a son of dean Anton Fredrik Winter Jakhelln Prytz (1853–1937). He was a nephew of goldsmith and architect Torolf Prytz, brother of chemist Milda Dorothea Prytz and of Fascist politician Frederik Prytz, uncle of writer Carl Frederik Prytz and first cousin of goldsmith Jakob Tostrup Prytz.

He graduated with the cand.jur. degree in 1907, but made his mark as a co-owner of the goldsmith company J. Tostrup, which was taken over by his uncle in 1890 and turned into a leading company in its field. Eiler Prytz also chaired the trade union Norges Gullsmedforbund, of which his uncle was a co-founder, from 1921 to 1932.
