= Hugo Fredrik Hjorthøy =

Norwegian topographer (1741–1812)

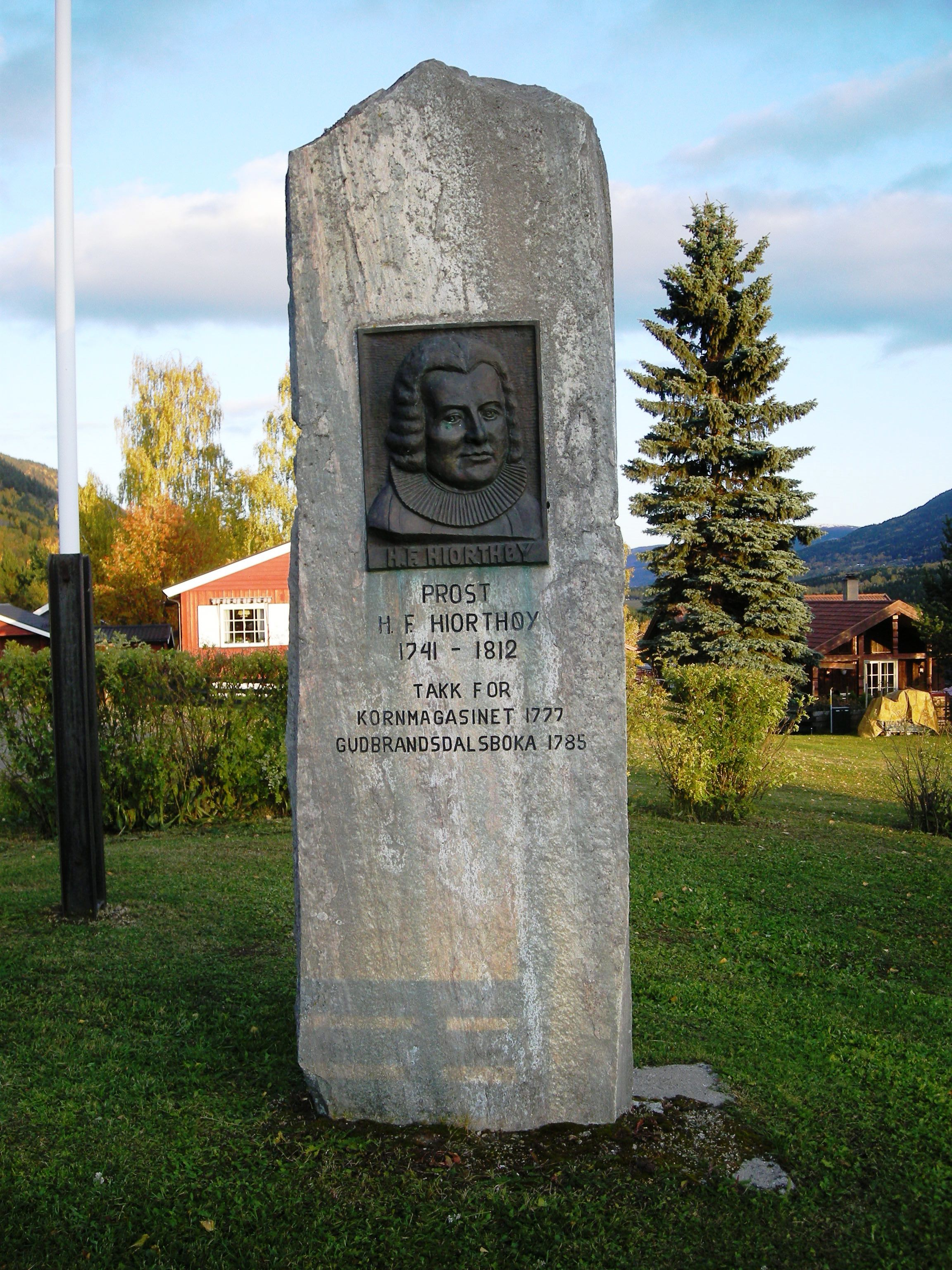
Memorial to Hugo F. Hiorthøy at Vinstra

Hugo Fredrik Hjorthøy (9 May 1741 – 29 August 1812) was a Norwegian priest and topographer.

He was born in Kleppe as the son of vicar Hugo Fredrik Hjorthøy (1700–1741) and his wife Inger Beata Schreuder (1705–1791). His father died before his birth, and hence Hjorthøy was sent to his mother's family in Fana. He was tutored by Johan Sebastian Cammermeyer. He studied at the University of Copenhagen, graduating with the cand.theol. degree in 1764. He was a curate in Flesberg from 1765 to 1768, and then worked in Denmark and on Danish ships from 1768. In 1771 he returned to Norway as vicar in Skien. He became vicar in Fron in 1774 and dean of Gudbrandsdalen in 1775. He was married to Bolette Marie Braag from November 1771 to her death in January 1776; he then married her sister Maren. He had three daughters and three sons in total.

He published the topographical-economical work Physisk og Ekonomisk Beskrivelse over Gulbrandsdalens Provstie in two volumes in 1785 and 1786. This work is regarded as one of the best of its kind and age. Hjorthøy was finally a vicar in Nykirken, Bergen from 1783 to 1791, and in Sund from 1791 to his death in 1812.
