= Torolf Prytz =

Norwegian politician and goldsmith

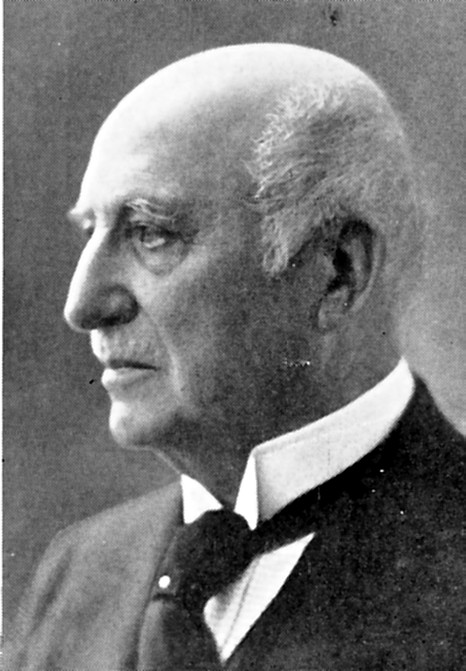
Torolf Prytz

Torolf Prytz (26 December 1858 – 16 June 1938) was a Norwegian architect, goldsmith and politician for the Liberal Party. He led the goldsmith company J. Tostrup of Oslo from 1890 to 1938, having inherited it from his grandfather-in-law Jacob Tostrup. He also served as Norwegian Minister of Industrial Provisioning from 1917 to 1918 and President of the Norwegian Red Cross from 1922 to 1930.

== Background ==
He was born in Alstahaug Municipality in Nordland, Norway. He was the son of bailiff Eiler Hagerup Krog Prytz, Sr. (1812–1900) and his wife Anne Margrethe Thomessen (1820–1900). The family moved to Christiania (now Oslo) when he was 12 years old. Prytz went to Kristiania Technical School. After completing his education at the polytechnic college of the University of Hannover, he was an assistant of architects Georg Andreas Bull and Henrik Thrap-Meyer.

== Career ==
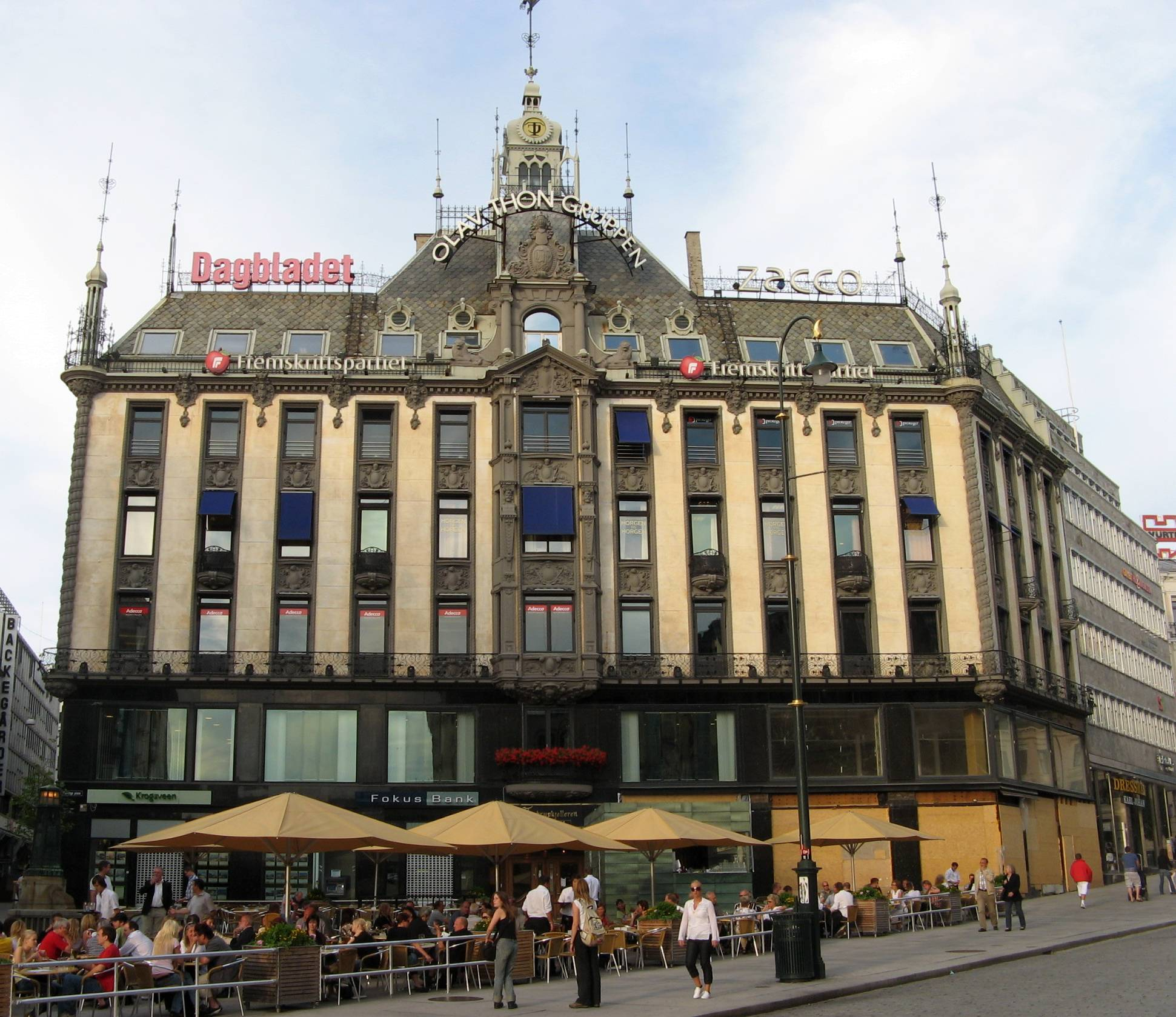
Tostrupgården at Karl Johans gate in Oslo

He started a cooperation with goldsmith Oluf Tostrup, a son of goldsmith Jacob Tostrup and co-owner in his company J. Tostrup. Prytz became formally affiliated with J. Tostrup in 1882, when Oluf Tostrup died. In 1884, after two years of studying, he was promoted from head designer to co-owner.

When Jacob Tostrup died in 1890, Prytz bought the entire company, retaining the tradename. He was an innovative filigree designer, and strengthened the company's position as one of the leading goldsmith companies in Norway. In 1898, he was behind the moving into a new store, Tostrupgården on Karl Johans gate which was built between 1893 and 1898 with Prytz, Waldemar Hansteen and Christian Fürst as architects.

He served as a deputy representative to the Norwegian Parliament during the term 1900–1903, representing the constituency of Kristiania, Hønefoss og Kongsvinger, and served as Minister of Industrial Provisioning from 1917 to 1918. From 1922 to 1930 he was the President of the Norwegian Red Cross. Prytz also chaired the board of Den norske Husflidsforening from 1907 to 1935, the National Institute of Technology from 1916 to 1935 and the Norwegian Museum of Decorative Arts and Design from 1929 to 1934. He was among the founders of Den norske Husflidsforening and the National Institute of Technology, as well the Norges Gullsmedforbund. He served as a member of the board of the Museum of Decorative Arts and Design from 1884 to 1934, Den norske Husflidsforening from 1891 to 1937 and the Norwegian National Academy of Craft and Art Industry from 1892 to 1900 and 1904 to 1928.

== Personal life ==
In July 1882, he married Hilda Nicoline Marie Tostrup (1861–1947), a granddaughter of Jacob Tostrup. Prytz was the father of Anne-Margrethe Cappelen Prytz (1888–1960), who was married to Erik Cappelen Knudsen (1882–1954), eldest son of Prime Minister Gunnar Knudsen. He was also the father of Jakob Tostrup Prytz (1886–1962) who followed him into the management of J. Tostrup. He was the grandfather of jewelry designers Grete Prytz Kittelsen and Jakob Tostrup Prytz, jr. He was also an uncle of Eiler Prytz who became a co-owner of J. Tostrup. He was made a Commander of the Royal Norwegian Order of St. Olav and a Knight of the French Legion of Honour. Torolf Prytz died in June 1938 at Vestre Aker.

Political offices
New office	Norwegian Minister of Industrial Provisioning; 1917–1918	Succeeded by Nils Claus Ihlen
