= Mathiesen family =

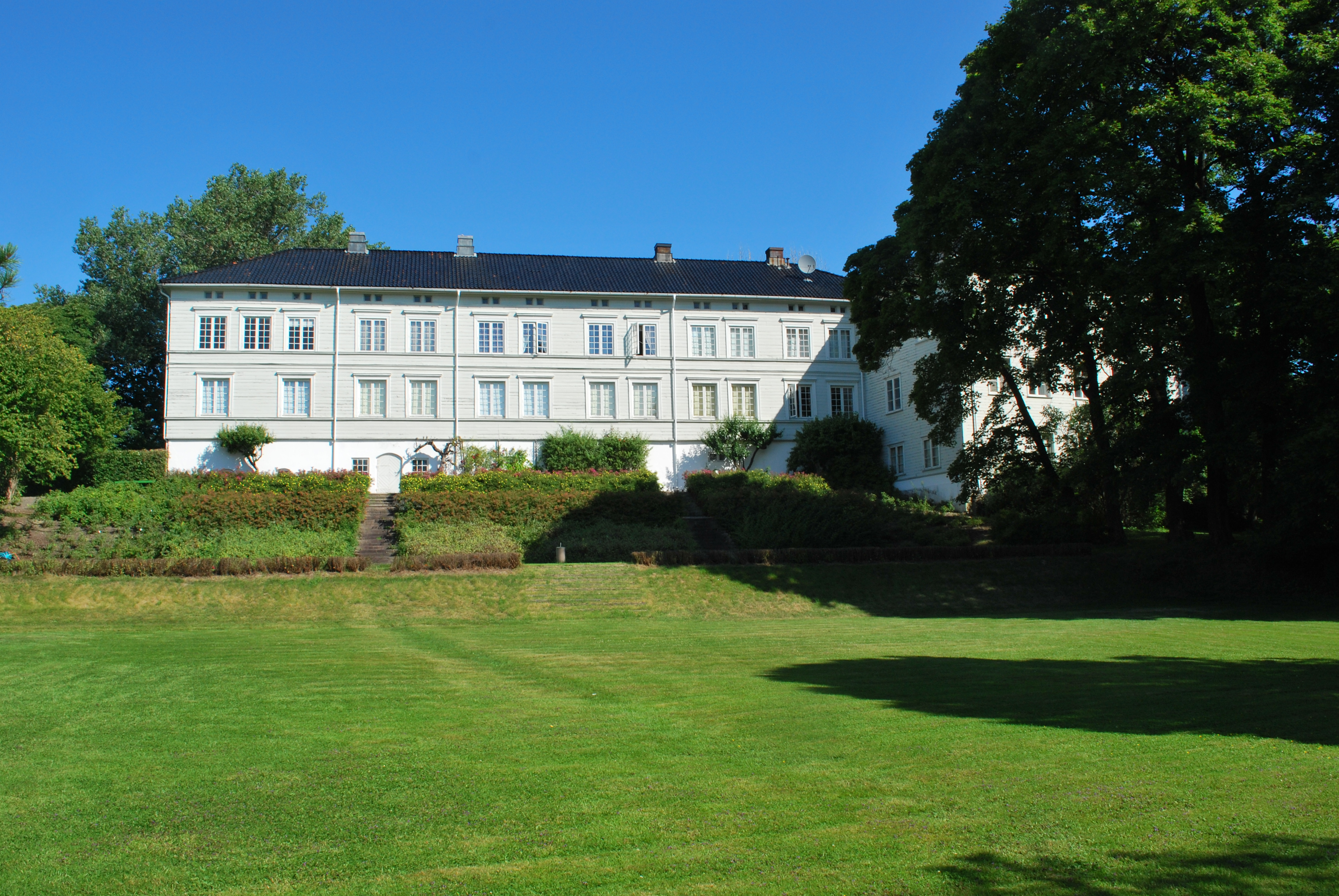
Linderud Manor in Oslo

Mathiesen is a common surname in Denmark and Norway. For other people named Mathiesen, see Mathiesen

Mathiesen is a Norwegian family of Danish origin, whose members have been noted as timber magnates, land-owners and businessmen.

The progenitor is the merchant Jørgen Mathiesen from Copenhagen (died 1656). His grandson Jørgen Mathiesen (1663–1742) settled in Norway, where he became bailiff in Helgeland. His descendants became timber merchants, and were co-owners of Tostrup & Mathiesen from 1842. In 1892, the Tostrup family sold their shares to the Mathiesen family, and the company was renamed Mathiesen Eidsvold Værk. From the 1990s, most of the activities were taken over by Moelven Industrier. The family also owned Linderud Manor in Oslo.

== Family members ==
- Haagen Mathiesen (1759–1842), Norwegian timber merchant, ship-owner and politician.
- Haaken C. Mathiesen (1827–1913), Norwegian landowner and businessperson
- Haaken L. Mathiesen (1858–1930), Norwegian landowner and businessperson
- Christian Pierre Mathiesen (1870–1953), Norwegian politician for the Conservative Party
- Jørgen Mathiesen (1901–1993), Norwegian landowner and businessperson

== Literature ==
- Haagen Krog Steffens: Linderud og slegterne Mogensen og Mathiesen, 1899 Fulltekst på NBdigital
- Haagen Krog Steffens: Norske Slægter 1912, Gyldendalske Boghandel, Kristiania 1911
- Hallvard Trætteberg: «Måne- og stjernevåpen». Meddelelser til slekten Mathiesen, Oslo 1946
- Norsk slektskalender, bind 1, Oslo 1949, utgitt av Norsk Slektshistorisk Forening
- Andreas Holmsen: Fra Linderud til Eidsvold Værk bind 1 (1946) og bind 2 (1971)
- Hans Krag: Norsk heraldisk mønstring fra Fredrik IV’s regjeringstid 1699-1730, Drøbak 1942 – Kristiansand S 1955, side 31 (fogden Jørgen Mathiesens seal from 1715 med våpenkappe i stedet for hjelmklede)
- Personalhistorisk Tidsskrift, XIV. Række, 6. Bind, København 1966
- Hans Cappelen: Norske slektsvåpen, Oslo 1969 (2nd ed. 1976), p. 165
- Herman L. Løvenskiold: Heraldisk nøkkel, Oslo 1978
- Harald Nissen and Monica Aase: Segl i Universitetsbiblioteket i Trondheim, Trondheim 1990, side 100 (seglet til fogden Jørgen Mathiesen (død 1742))
