= Mathiesen =

Mathiesen is a Danish-Norwegian patronymic surname meaning "son of Mathies" (equivalent of the Biblical Μαθθαιος, cf. English Matthew). Several spelling variants are used, including Matthiesen, Matthiessen, Mathisen, Matthisen. A similar diversity of forms exist for the parallel given name Mathias. There are several people with the surname Mathiesen:

- Aino Mathiesen-Käärik (1918–2021), Estonia-born Swedish botanist, microbiologist
- Árni Mathiesen (born 1958), Icelandic politician
- Børge Mathiesen (1918–1962), Danish football player
- Brian Vad Mathiesen, (born 1978), Danish engineer and professor
- Charles Mathiesen (1911–1994), Norwegian speed skater
- Mathiesen family, a Norwegian business family, including
  - Christian Pierre Mathiesen (1870–1953), Norwegian politician for the Conservative Party
  - Haagen Mathiesen (1759–1842), Norwegian timber merchant, ship-owner and politician.
  - Haaken C. Mathiesen (1827–1913), Norwegian landowner and businessperson
  - Haaken L. Mathiesen (1858–1930), Norwegian landowner and businessperson
  - Jørgen Mathiesen (1901–1993), Norwegian landowner and businessperson
- Hein-Arne Mathiesen (born 1971), Norwegian ski jumper
- Mattis Mathiesen (1924–2010), Norwegian photographer and film director
- Mihkel Mathiesen (1918–2003), Estonian politician
- Niels Mathiesen (1829–1900), Norwegian politician and merchant
- Pål Mathiesen (born 1977), Norwegian musician
- Per Mathiesen (1885–1971), Norwegian gymnast
- Thomas Mathiesen (1933–2021), Norwegian sociologist
- Thomas J. Mathiesen (born 1947), American musicologist

Matthiesen may refer to:

- Heike Matthiesen (1964–2023), German classical guitarist
- Leroy Matthiesen (1921–2010), Roman Catholic Bishop of Amarillo, Texas
- Lilian Matthiesen (born 1984), mathematician
- Mark Matthiesen, American politician from Missouri
