= Haaken C. Mathiesen Jr. =

Norwegian businessperson

Haaken Christian Mathiesen (9 October 1896 – 30 July 1975) was a Norwegian businessperson, who founded the Norwegian branch of Texaco.

== Personal life ==
He was born in Trondhjem as a son of landowner and politician Christian Pierre Mathiesen (1870–1953) and Celina Ihlen (1874–1948). On the paternal side he was a grandson of Haaken C. Mathiesen, a nephew of Haaken L. Mathiesen and a first cousin of Jørgen Mathiesen. On the maternal side he was a grandson of Jacob Thurmann Ihlen and Belgian citizen Ambrosine Pauline Rouquet. Through his mother's sisters he was a nephew of Arthur Knagenhjelm and Jens Gran Gleditsch and a second cousin of Kai Knagenhjelm. Through his grandfather's brothers Niels and Wincentz Thurmann Ihlen he was a second cousin of Nils, Joakim and Alf Ihlen.

In 1931 he married Magdalene Bull Wilhelmsen, a daughter of Finn Wilhelmsen and Magdalene Fredrikke Bull.

== Career ==
He finished his secondary education in 1914. He attended Harvard University and studied elsewhere in France and Germany. He was the founder of Texaco Norway, and chaired Texaco Norway and Norsk Texaco Oil. After mergers and acquisitions through history, the company is now known as YX Energi.

He was a member of the board or supervisory council of many companies, including Wilh. Wilhelmsen, Fred. Olsen & Co, Forsikringsselskapet Norden, Den norske Creditbank, Arthur Mathiesen & Co, Elkem, Norsk Elektrisk & Brown Boveri, Tønsberg Margarinfabrik and Farmand Fabriker. He died in July 1975 and was buried in Gamle Aker.
