= Haaken Mathiesen =

Haaken Mathiesen may refer to:

- Haaken L. Mathiesen (1858–1930), Norwegian landowner and businessman
- Haaken C. Mathiesen (1827–1913), Norwegian landowner and businessman
- Haaken Severin Mathiesen (1926–1997), Norwegian landowner and businessman
- Haaken C. Mathiesen Jr. (1896–1975), Norwegian businessman
