= Haaken =

Haaken is a surname and a given name. Notable people with the name include:

Given name:

- Haaken Christensen (1924–2008), Norwegian art historian, art collector and gallerist
- Haaken Hasberg Gran (1870–1955), Norwegian botanist
- Haaken Gulleson, Swedish painter and workshop leader
- Haaken C. Mathiesen Jr. (1896–1975), Norwegian businessperson who founded the Norwegian branch of Texaco
- Haaken C. Mathiesen (1827–1913), Norwegian landowner and businessperson in the forestry sector
- Haaken L. Mathiesen (1858–1930), Norwegian landowner and businessperson in the forestry sector
- Haaken Severin Mathiesen (1926–1997), Norwegian landowner and businessperson in the forestry sector

Surname:

- Jan Haaken (born 1947), American clinical psychologist, documentarian, professor
