= Mathiasen =

Mathiasen is a Danish-Norwegian patronymic surname meaning "son of Mathias" (equivalent of the Biblical Μαθθαιος, cf. English Matthew). Several spelling variants are used, including Matthiasen and Matthiassen. A similar diversity of forms exist for the parallel given name Mathies/Mathis. Though not a hard and fast rule, generally spellings with a single s are Danish and a double ss are Norwegian. There are several people with the surname Mathiasen:

- Jakob Mathiasen, Danish athlete
- Dwight Mathiasen (born 1963), Canadian ice hockey player
- Dennis Mathiasen (born 1981), Danish handball players

Matthiasen may refer to:

- Niels Matthiasen, Danish politician

Mathiassen may refer to:

- Therkel Mathiassen (1892–1967), Danish archaeologist

== See also ==
- Matthiessen
- Mathiesen
