= Christopher Henrik Holfeldt Tostrup =

Norwegian timber merchant and land-owner

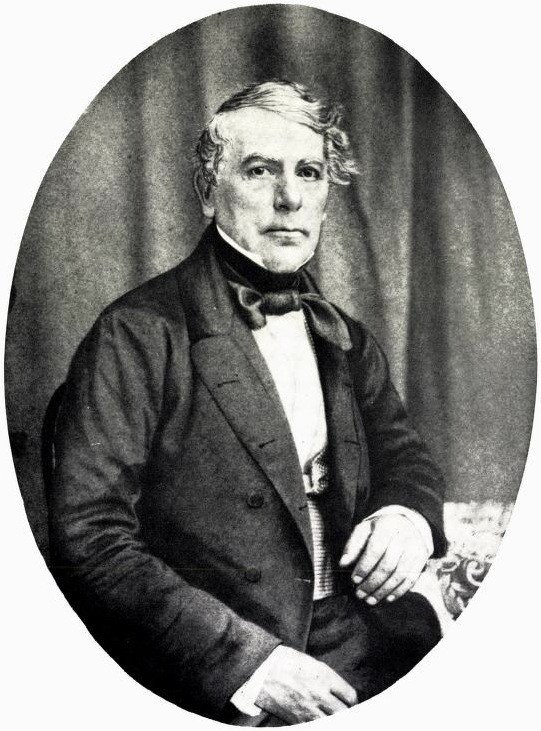
Christopher Tostrup

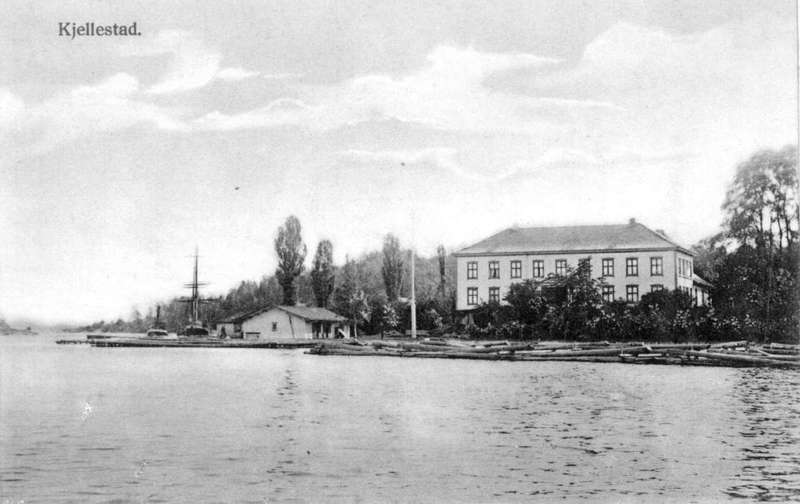
Kjellestad at Stathelle

Christopher Henrik Holfeldt Tostrup (20 September 1804- 17 October 1881) was a Norwegian timber merchant and land-owner.

== Biography ==
Tostrup was born at Hjelmeland in Rogaland, Norway. He was the son of infantry captain Nicolai Tostrup (1768–1858) and his wife Thale Margrethe Resen Holfeldt (1779–1860). He was one of eight siblings in a family which included goldsmith Jacob Tostrup (1806–1890) and politician Hans Tostrup (1799-1856) .

In 1828, he was employed by Haagen Mathiesen (1759–1842) and became manager of Mathiesen's properties in Hurdal, Skedsmo and Trysil. After Mathiesen's death in 1842, he bought the properties in Hurdal, Hadeland, and Nannestad together with Mathiesen's son Mogens Larsen Mathiesen (1799–1875). They then formed the firm Tostrup & Mathiesen. Mogens Mathiesen's son Haaken C. Mathiesen (1827-1913) soon joined the company, which became one of the largest timber companies in Norway.

Tostrup's heirs sold their interest in the Tostrup & Mathiesen company to members of the Mathiesen family in 1892. It was subsequently renamed Mathiesen Eidsvold Værk, and much of the company is today continued under the name Moelven Industrier.

== Personal life ==
From 1870, Tostrup also owned the manor house Kjellestad at Stathelle in Telemark. Christopher Tostrup was married to Julie Camilla Schaft (1814–1897) who was a daughter of justice councilor Andreas Schaft (1760-1826). They had three sons and four daughters. He was the grandfather of art collector and philanthropist Christopher Tostrup Paus (1862-1943).

== Literature ==
- S. H. Finne-Grønn. Familien Tostrup fra Lister. Christiania, 1897
