= Jacob Thurmann Ihlen =

Norwegian barrister and politician

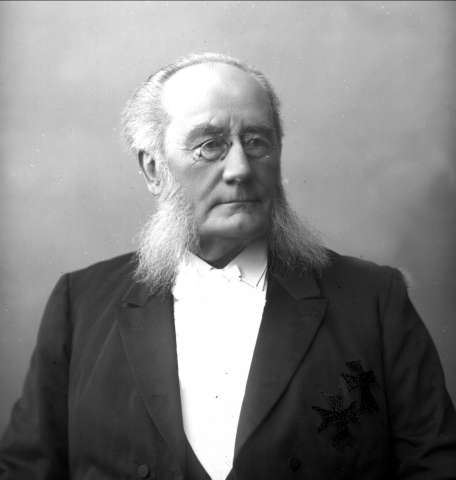
Jacob Thurmann Ihlen, photographed by Gustav Borgen

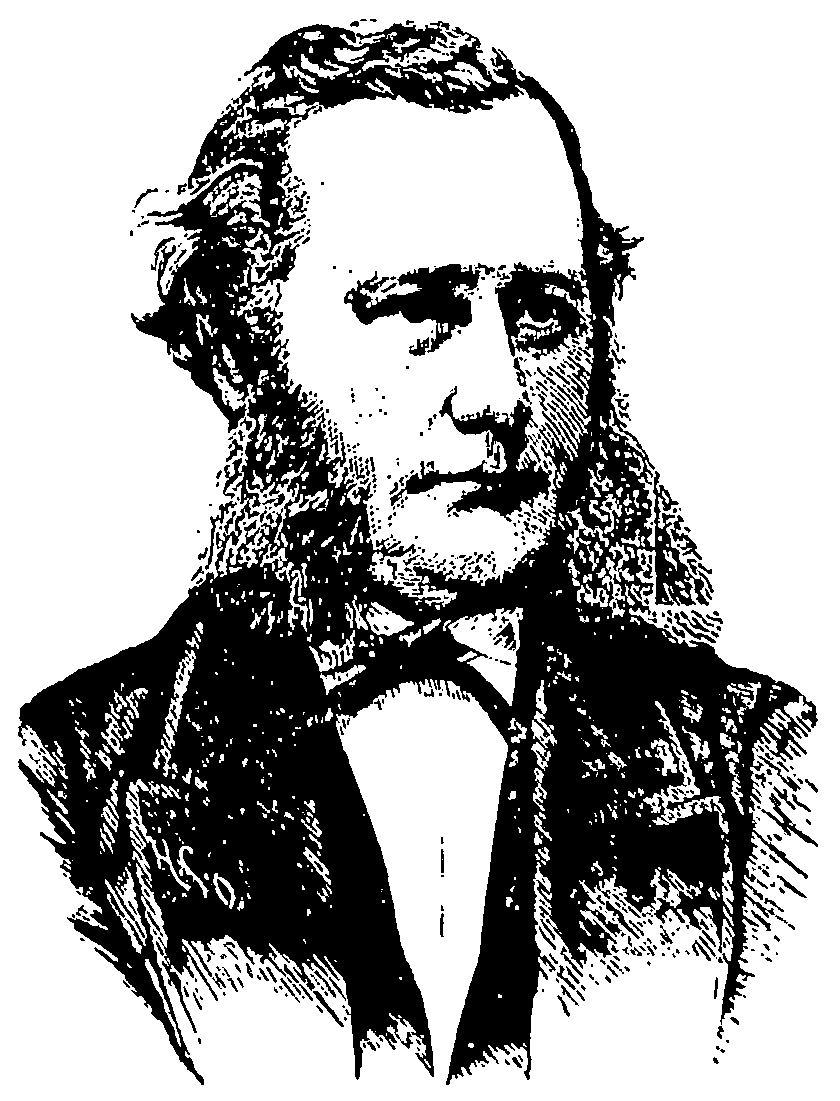
Jacob Thurmann Ihlen, Verdens Gang 1885.

Jacob Thurmann Ihlen (17 May 1833 – 10 October 1903) was a Norwegian barrister and politician for the Conservative Party.

== Personal life ==
He was born in Holmestrand as the son of ship-owner Nils Ihlen (1793–1865) and Barbara Wincentz Thurmann (1800–1879). He was a brother of Niels Ihlen and Wincentz Thurmann Ihlen, an uncle of Christian and Nils Claus Ihlen, and a granduncle of Nils, Joakim and Alf Ihlen.

He married Belgian citizen Ambroisine Pauline Rouquet in February 1868 in Our Saviour's Church, and the couple had five children. One daughter, Celina, married landowner and politician Christian Pierre Mathiesen, and was the mother of Haaken C. Mathiesen, Jr. Another daughter, Barbara, married barrister Arthur Knagenhjelm. Another daughter, Marie, married bishop Jens Gran Gleditsch. Their son Jacob Ihlen was an attorney and captain, and owned the property Parkveien 37 for some time.

== Career ==
He finished his secondary education in 1851 and took the cand.jur. degree in 1855. After working three years as a trainee in a trading company, he was an attorney in Christiania from 1859, and a barrister with access to working with Supreme Court cases from 1863. He was elected to the Parliament of Norway in 1883, and re-elected in 1886, representing the urban constituency of Kristiania, Hønefoss og Kongsvinger. He was a member of Kristiania city council from 1872.

He was a co-founder of Forsikringsselskapet Norden together with Carl Ferdinand Gjerdrum, and chairman of the board from 1867 to 1903. From 1871 to 1903 he chaired Forsikringsselskapet Poseidon. He was also a deputy board member of Hypothekbanken from 1888.

He was decorated as a Commander of the Order of St. Olav in 1894. He was also a Commander of the Order of the Dannebrog and the Order of the Polar Star. He died in 1903 in Kristiania. His son-in-law Christian Pierre later became chairman of Forsikringsselskapet Norden.
