= Ole Clausen Mørch =

Norwegian politician, merchant, and banker

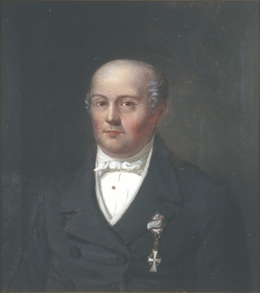
Ole Clausen Mørch

Ole Clausen Mørch (2 August 1774 – 4 July 1829) was a Norwegian merchant and banker. He served as a representative at the Norwegian Constituent Assembly at Eidsvoll in 1814.

He was born in Christianssand in Vest-Agder, Norway. He was the son of a merchant, Claus Mørch. After his father's death in 1797, he inherited his father's business and a number of properties. From 1825 to 1828 he was Director of Christianssands Sparebank, one of the first savings banks in Norway.

In 1814, Ole Clausen Mørch was elected to the Norwegian Constituent Assembly at Eidsvoll as a representative of Christianssand. At the Assembly. he supported the position of the Union Party (Unionspartiet). Mørch was also a member of the finance committee.

== Personal life ==
He married Cathrine Margrethe Tobiesen (1779–1847) in June 1797. The couple had two daughters and two sons. One of his granddaughters married Wincentz Thurmann Ihlen, brother of Jacob Thurmann Ihlen and father of the later Minister of Foreign Affairs Nils Claus Ihlen.
