= Haaken Severin Mathiesen =

Norwegian landowner and businessperson

Haaken Severin Mathiesen (3 October 1926 – 12 September 1997) was a Norwegian landowner and businessperson in the forestry sector.

He was a son of landowner Jørgen Arthur Mathiesen, and as such a grandson of Haaken L. Mathiesen and great-grandson of Haaken C. Mathiesen and Anders Ferrand Kiær.

In 1946 he became a co-owner in the family company Mathiesen Eidsvold Værk. He was appointed as manager of the company in 1953. From 1963 to 1969 he was the sole owner of the company, but he passed it on to his sons Haaken Eric Mathiesen and Willem Frederik Mathiesen.

He was decorated as a Knight, First Class of the Royal Norwegian Order of St. Olav and a Knight of the Order of the Falcon. He was also an honorary member of Foreningen Norden and the sports club Eidsvold Værks SK.
