= Hans Tostrup =

Norwegian politician

Hans Tostrup (20 October 1799 – 27 January 1856) was a Norwegian politician, civil servant and government official.

Tostrup was born at Hjelmeland in Rogaland county, Norway. He was the son of infantry captain Nicolai Tostrup (1768–1858) and his wife Thale Margrethe Resen Holfeldt (1779–1860). He was one of eight siblings in a family which included goldsmith Jacob Tostrup (1806–1890) and timber merchant Christopher Tostrup (1804-1881) who co-owned the company Tostrup & Mathiesen.

He started a military career, but due to declining vision he switched to a civil servant career, graduating as cand.jur. in 1824. From 1832 to 1836, he was appointed as a secretary at the University of Christiania (now University of Oslo). For the next seven years, he held a position at Fredriksvern (Fredriksvern verft) in Stavern.

Tostrup was acting County Governor of Jarlsberg og Laurvigs Amt (now Vestfold county) in 1843, County Governor of Nordre Bergenhus Amt (now part of Vestland county) from 1844 to 1852, and County Governor of Kristians Amt (now part of Innlandet county) from 1852 to 1854. He was elected to the Norwegian Parliament in 1848, representing Nordre Bergenhus Amt. He stood for re-election, but failed.

Civic offices
Preceded by Christian Ulrik Kastrup	County Governor of Nordre Bergenhus; 1844–1852	Succeeded by Michael Aubert
Preceded by Lauritz Weidemann	County Governor of Oppland; 1852–1854	Succeeded by Johan Christian Collett
