= 1941 theatre strike in Norway =

The theatre strike in Norway in 1941 was a conflict between Norwegian actors and Nazi authorities, during the German occupation of the country. The strike involved theatres in the cities of Oslo, Bergen and Trondheim. The strike started on 21 May 1941, as a response to the revocation of working permits for six actors, after they had refused to perform in the Nazified radio. It lasted for five weeks.

== Background ==
In Norway there was a state monopoly on radio, which was broadcast by the Norwegian Broadcasting Corporation (NRK). When Norway was invaded by Germany on 9 April 1940, the Nazis seized control of NRK. A Norwegian Theatre Directorate was established, subordinate to the Ministry of Culture and Enlightenment.

During the early period of the occupation of Norway by Nazi Germany, cultural conflicts did not surface. But eventually, about the turn of the year 1940/1941, actors started to express unwillingness to participate in German festivities, and to perform on radio. The resistance movement also issued a parole against radio performance broadcasts. On 14 January 1941 Minister Lunde issued a bull of excommunication, which said that any actor who declined to perform publicly, either on theatre, in radio or at festivities organized by the authorities, should not be allowed to work as an actor in Norway. This prompted theatre directors to gather in Oslo, and contact was established between the directors and the Norwegian Actors' Equity Association (NSF). There was a general agreement that Lunde's document violated basic civil rights, and that such violations were unacceptable. On 23 January board members of NSF were summoned to Reichskommissar Josef Terboven's office, where they were told that German authorities supported the Ministry, and that violations would be met by the strongest measures. To be held responsible were both the actor herself/himself, the theatre director, the union representative, and the entire board of the NSF. Harald Schwenzen, acting chairman of the NSF, published the directives on bulletin boards at the various theatres. A strike parole, formulated by Gerda Ring and August Lange, was secretly distributed among actors, signed and hidden. The parole text said that if an artist should lose their work for non-artistic reasons, the undersigned were willing to take the consequence and go on strike. Subsequent negotiations between theatre workers and authorities eventually resulted in a document that was mutually accepted. In particular the document emphasized that actors could freely dispose of their spare time.

== Strike ==
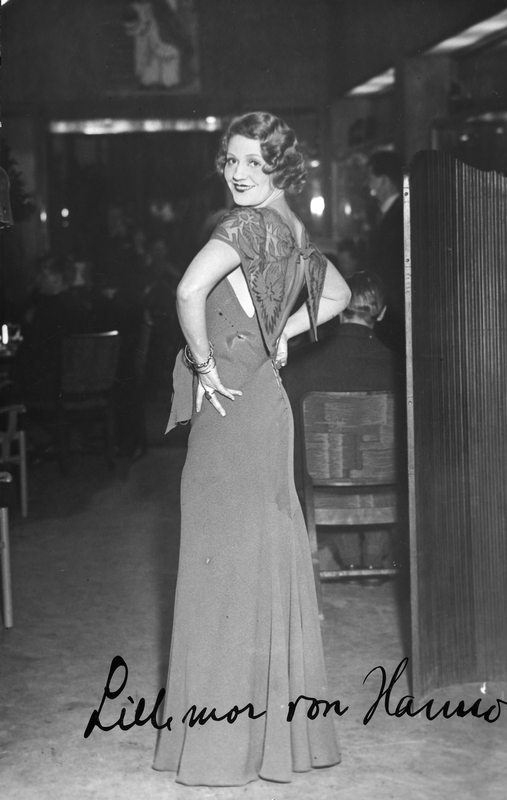
Actress Lillemor von Hanno got her working permit revoked.

In early May 1941, seven actors eventually received a letter from the Ministry, in which they were ordered to play for the Norwegian Broadcasting Corporation when requested. The seven selected actors were Aase Bye, Elisabeth Gording, Lillemor von Hanno, Georg Løkkeberg, Gerda Ring, Lasse Segelcke and Tore Segelcke. Aase Bye was playing in Stockholm at the time and could not respond to the letter. The other six declared that they would continue their work at the theatre, but claimed their right to freely dispose of their spare time. On 21 May, the six actors were called to meet at the police headquarters Victoria Terrasse for interrogation, and all six were revoked of their working permits as actors. On the same evening the theatre strike was effective on all stages in Oslo. From the next day, also the theatres in Bergen and Trondheim joined the strike. This was the first time during the occupation that a complete occupational group went on strike. The conflict quickly escalated, as the Nazi authorities did not accept such behavior. On 22 May the theatre directors were summoned to the Gestapo and instructed to order the actors to resume performing. The instructions were accompanied with threats of strongest reprisals. On a meeting between directors and actors in Oslo on 23 May, the German threats were communicated to the actors. The meeting decided to keep on striking, with 110 against 18 votes. On 24 May the Germans presented a new ultimatum, they also arrested union representatives at the theatres in Oslo, Bergen and Trondheim, and the next day also central members of the Norwegian Actors' Equity Association. At a meeting between all theatre directors and chairmen on 26 May, a letter of protest was signed and sent to Reichskommissar Terboven. The letter referred to Article 43 of the Laws and Customs of War on Land from the Hague Convention of 1907, which states that the occupant of a country shall respect the laws in force in the country. This letter was never answered. The strike continued. In June the Germans declared that the strike was regarded as a revolt against the Wehrmacht and der Führer. The strike was mentioned in Swiss newspapers, and Germans announced that this now had turned into a high political affair. Negotiations continued until 20 June, when the actors agreed it was time to end the strike. During the negotiations various threats had been mentioned, including death penalties. The strike had lasted five weeks.

== Aftermath ==
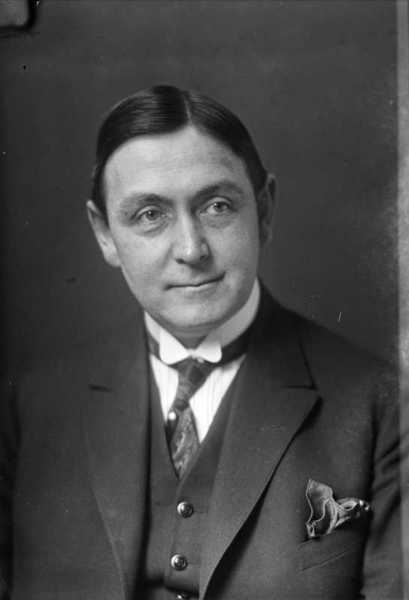
Professor Francis Bull was incarcerated at the Grini concentration camp for three years, from 1941 to 1944.

After the conflict the Ministry of Culture, subordinated to Nazi authorities, decided to take full control of the theatres. The board members of the Nationaltheatret were replaced, and Harald Grieg, Francis Bull and Johannes Sejersted Bødtker were arrested and incarcerated at the Grini concentration camp for years. After the Nazification of the theatres, a general boycott from the public became effective. Some actors continued to play during the war years, while others fled from the country after a while. Trøndelag Teater in Trondheim did try to carry on, with both subliminal and open satire against the Nazi authorities. Its director Henry Gleditsch was warned several times that there might be an imminent crackdown on his theatre, and advised to flee to the neutral country Sweden. Gleditsch did not do so. In October 1942, the authorities declared martial law in Trondheim following the Majavatn affair. The opportunity was seized to apprehend Gleditsch, and he was promptly executed. Trøndelag Teater was subsequently Nazified and, similar to other such theatres, boycotted.
