= Alfred Gjems Selmer =

Norwegian actor

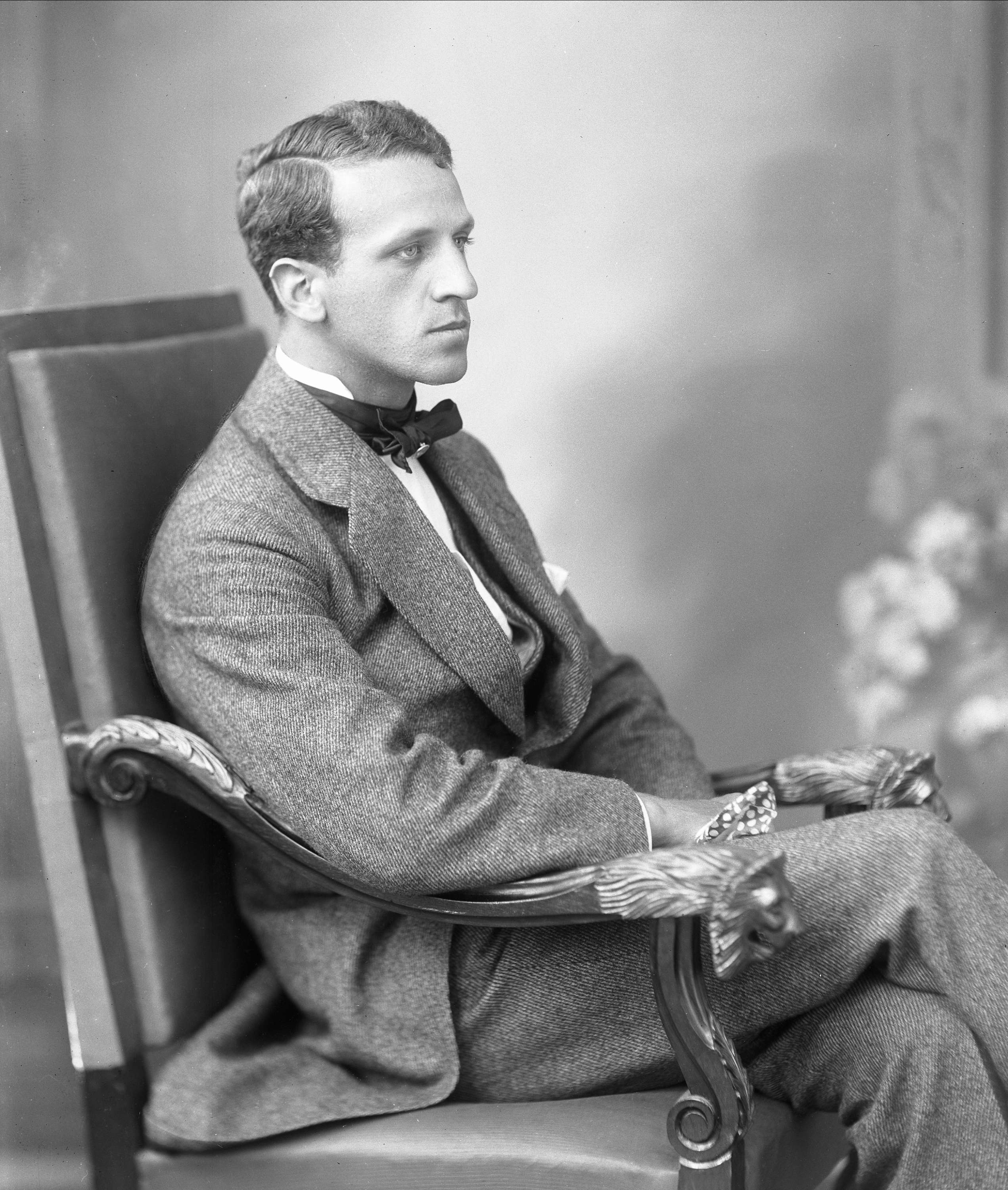
- Born: June 4, 1893; Balsfjord, Norway
- Died: January 30, 1919 (aged 25); Trondheim, Norway
- Occupation: Actor
- Spouse: Liv Uchermann Selmer
- Parents: Alfred Selmer (father); Ågot Gjems Selmer (mother)
- Relatives: Tordis Gjems Selmer, Lillemor von Hanno

Alfred Jørgen Gjems Selmer (June 4, 1893 – January 30, 1919) was a Norwegian actor.

Selmer was born in Balsfjord Municipality in Troms county, Norway, the son of the district physician Alfred Selmer and the actress and writer Ågot Gjems Selmer. One of his sisters was the singer Tordis Gjems Selmer, and another was the actress and writer Lillemor von Hanno. Selmer was married to the actress Liv Uchermann Selmer.

In 1918, Selmer played Erhart Borkman in a production of Henrik Ibsen's John Gabriel Borkman at the National Theater in Bergen.

Selmer died of the Spanish flu in 1919.
