= Tordis Gjems Selmer =

Norwegian singer

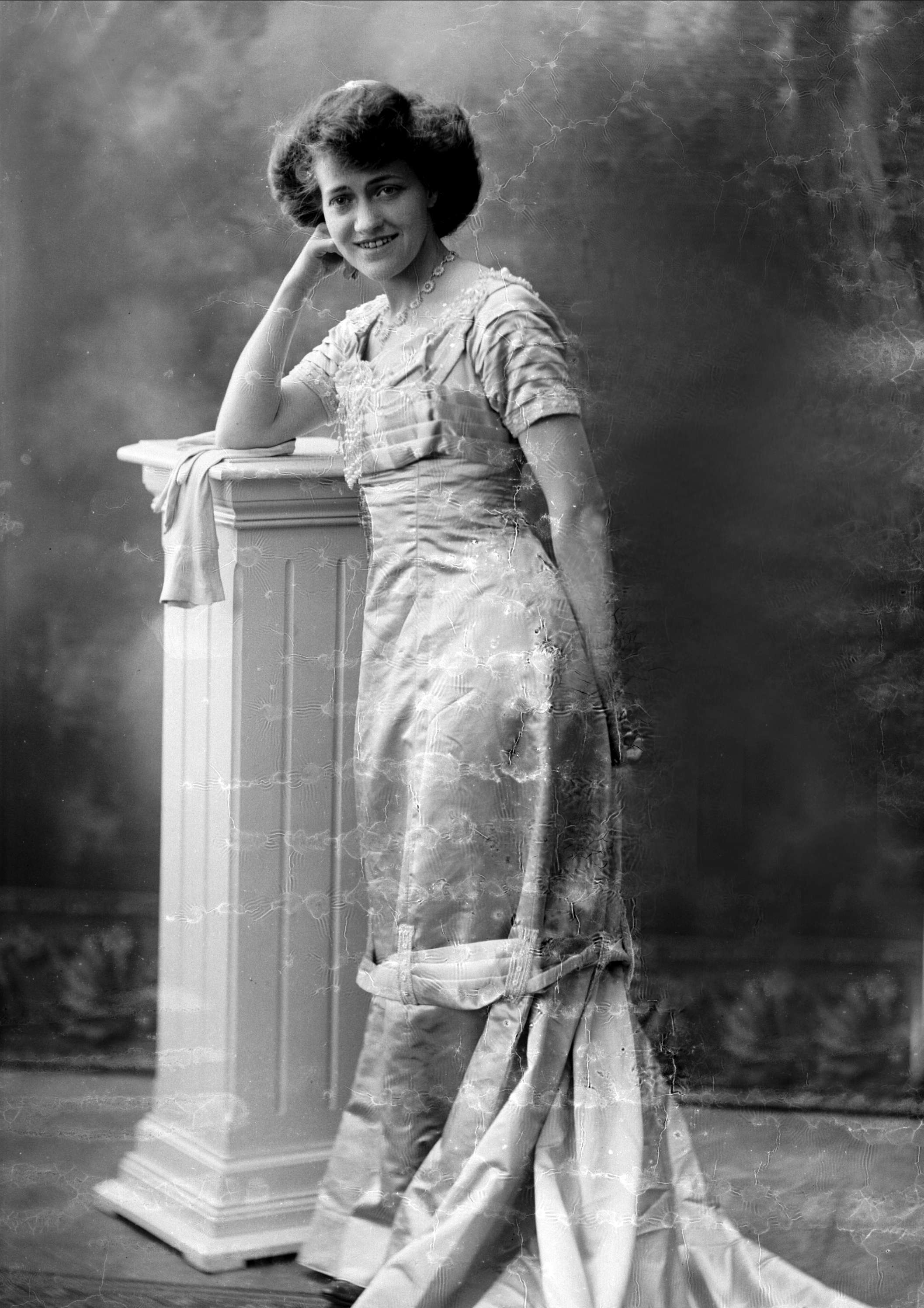
- Born: June 2, 1886; Balsfjord, Norway
- Died: February 15, 1964 (aged 77)
- Occupation: Singer
- Parents: Alfred Selmer (father); Ågot Gjems Selmer (mother)
- Relatives: Alfred Gjems Selmer, Lillemor von Hanno

Tordis Gjems Selmer (June 2, 1886 – February 15, 1964) was a Norwegian singer.

Selmer was born in Balsfjord Municipality in Troms county Norway, the son of the district physician Alfred Selmer and the actress and writer Ågot Gjems Selmer. She was the sister of the actor Alfred Gjems Selmer (1893–1919), and her younger sister was the actress and writer Lillemor von Hanno (1900–1984).

Selmer took voice lessons in Oslo, Berlin, and London, and she toured the Nordic countries. She was engaged at the Chat Noir cabaret from 1916 to 1917, and she worked as a culture journalist for the women's magazine Urd from 1925 onward.

Her father died in 1919 after falling off a horse while visiting a sick patient, and her brother Alfred died the same year. After her mother's death in 1926, Selmer ran a boarding house in the family home, Soleglad, which her father had purchased in 1903. There, among other things, she hosted a cultural café during the Second World War together with the opera singer Randi Helseth (1905–1991). In 1956, Selmer married her childhood friend, the land consolidation judge Lars Eknes, who sold the home in 1965 after Selmer died in 1964.
