= Ågot Gjems Selmer =

Norwegian actress and writer (1857–1926)

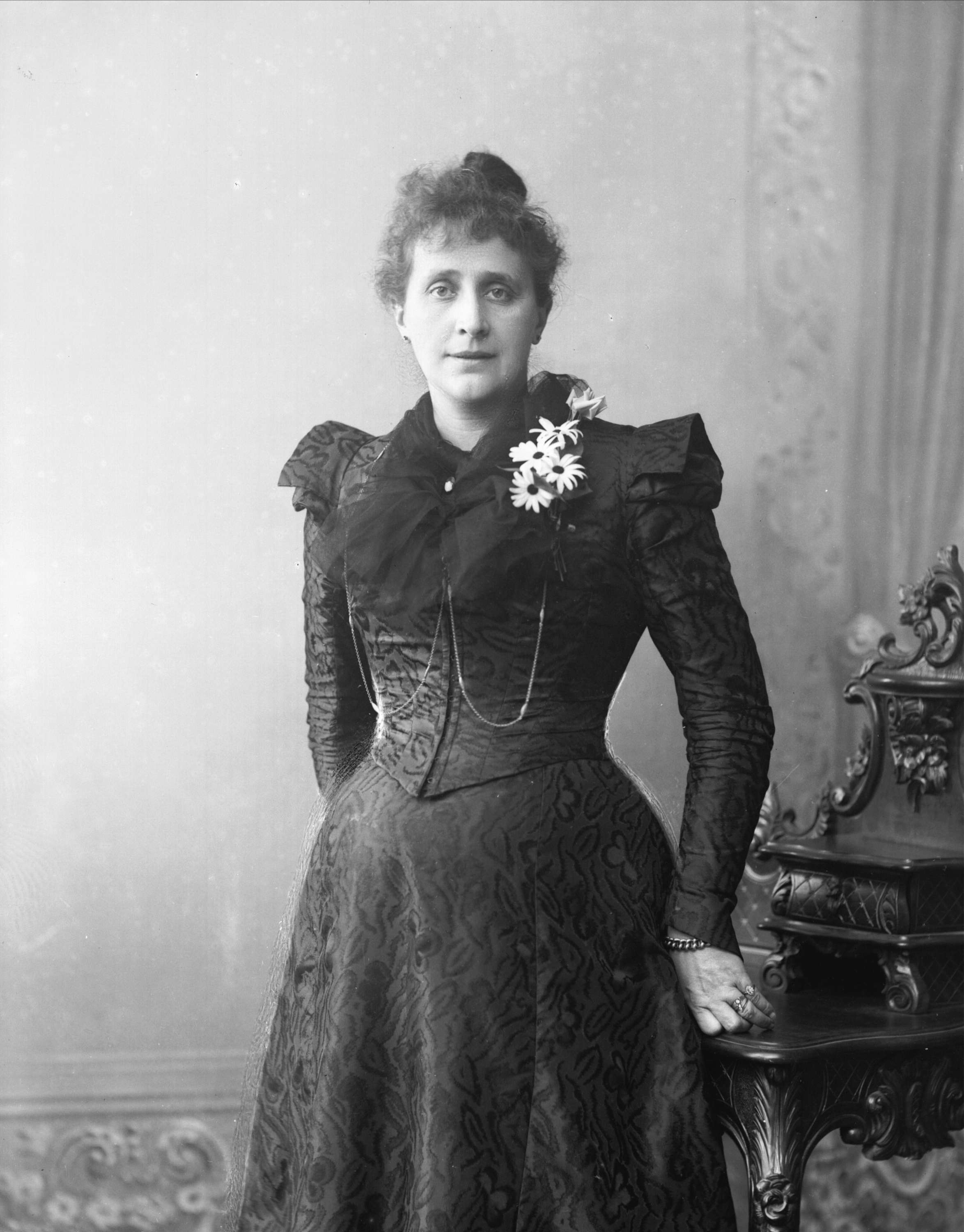
Ågot Gjems Selmer

Ågot Gjems Selmer, also Ågot Gjems-Selmer, (27 October 1857 – 25 September 1926) was a Norwegian actress, writer, and lecturer.

== Early life and education ==
Gjems-Selmer was born into a wealthy family in Kongsvinger Municipality, Norway. She was the eldest of nine siblings born to Svend Jørgen Gjems and Johanne Rolfsen. As a 12-year-old, the family relocated to Kristiania (now Oslo). She graduated in 1876 and decided to become an actor.

== Career ==
While working as an actress, Gjems-Selmer performed at the Christiania Theatre, where in 1883, she played the role of Petra in the staging of Henrik Ibsen's An Enemy of the People, attracting critical acclaim.

She wrote a total of ten books, some translated into several languages including German, Dutch and Hungarian. Some were based on memories of her own childhood in Kongsvinger Municipality. These included Da mor var liten (When Mother was Little), describing how she became acquainted with Norwegian cultural celebrities including Jonas Lie, Bjørnstjerne Bjørnson, Ole Bull, Aasmund Olavsson Vinje and Erik Werenskiold. Later, when she and her husband lived in Balsfjord Municipality for 19 years, her wrote about family life in the far north. One of her works was published in Germany (with several reprints) as Die Docktorsfamilie im Hohen Norden (The Doctor's Family in the Far North).

While Gjems-Selmer was not among the leading Norwegian authors of her day, she was a recognized female intellectual and a useful source of detailed information. She was also active in the area of women's rights, supporting votes for women.

== Personal life ==
In 1883, she married physician, Alfred Selmer (1851–1919) who became the first resident district physician in Balsfjord Municipality, just south of the city of Tromsø. After nineteen years, they moved to Ås Municipality in Akershus. They had eight children, five reaching adulthood, including the singer Tordis Gjems Selmer (1886–1964), actor Alfred Gjems Selmer (1893–1919), and actor and writer Lillemor von Hanno (1900–1984).

After both her husband and their son died in 1919, she retired to Villa Soleglad at Ås in Akershus where she died in 1926.

== Selected works ==
- Smaapigernes bog (1900)
- Et hjem for mennesker: en Menneskeskildring i tre Handlinger (1901)
- Da mor var liden (1902)
- Kvinderne i Bjørnsons digtning. Essay (1907)
- Lillemor - (1911)
- Den gang -. Af mit livs digt (1915)
- Mor fortæller (1915)

== Other sources ==
- Elvestad, Lill-Karin (2019). Ågot Gjems Selmer (1857-1926) (in Norwegian). Orkana Akademisk. ISBN 9788281043879.
