= Mogens Larsen Monsen =

Norwegian timber trader and major land owner

- Born: 18 June 1727; Christiania, Norway
- Died: 3 May 1802 (aged 74); Christiania, Norway
- Occupation: Timber trader
- Relatives: Maren Juel (sister-in-law); Haagen Mathiesen (son-in-law); Haaken C. Mathiesen (great-grandson)

Mogens Larsen Monsen (18 June 1727 – 3 May 1802) was a Norwegian timber trader and major land owner. Among other properties, he was the owner of the Linderud Manor.

== Biography ==
Monsen was born in Christiania (now Oslo), Norway. He was the son of timber trader Erich Mogensen (1687–1742) and Johanna Neve (1699–1755). His father died when he was fifteen years old and he took over a business which had been built by both his father and grandfather. The core of Monsen's business was based on timber purchases in the Glomma river system, besides some of his own forests.

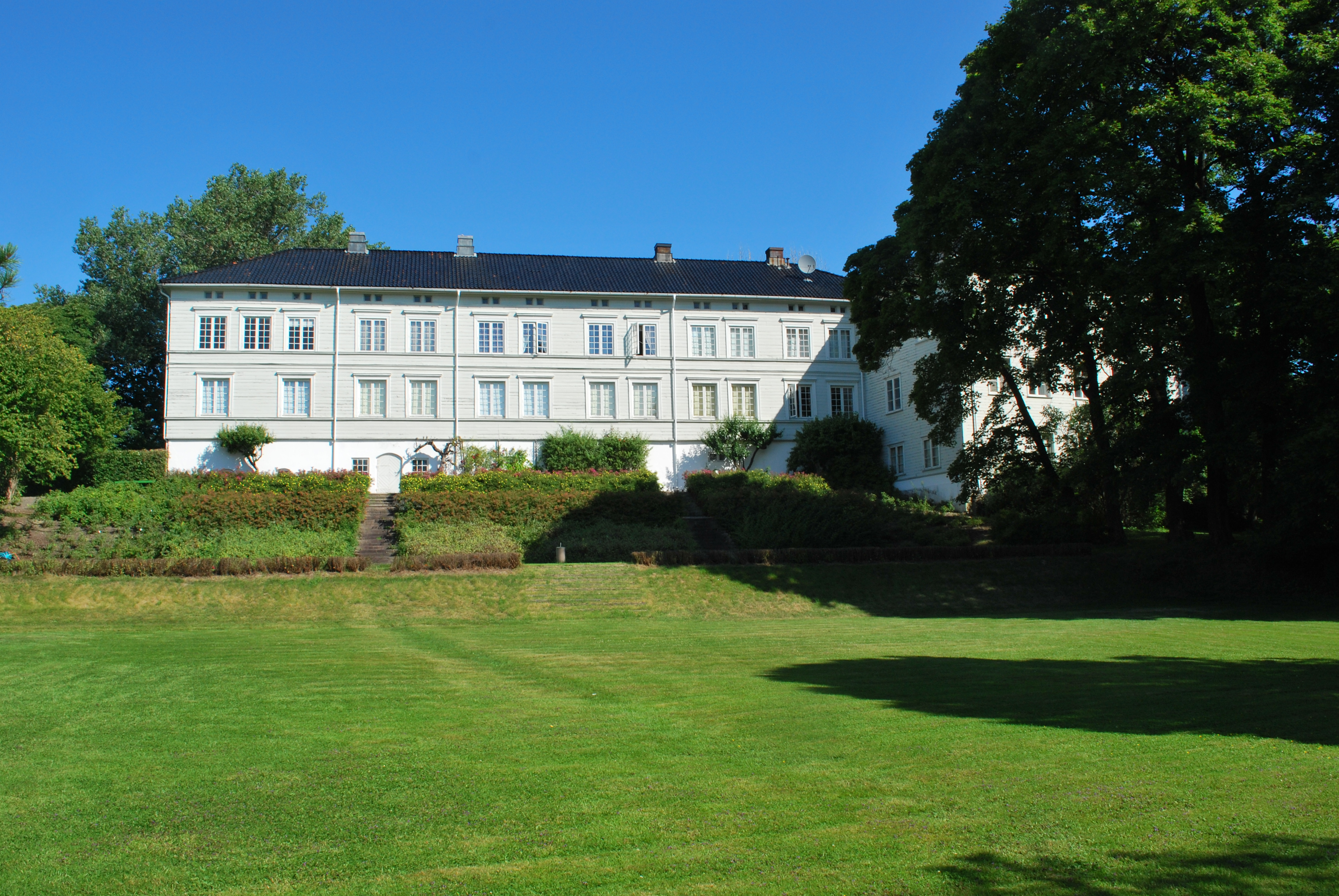
Linderud Manor

Linderud Manor (Linderud gård) was inherited by Mogens Larsen Monsen. Linderud was the center of a large estate that included several hundred thousand acres of forest, many saws and farmland. Monsen developed the manor house with the rococo hall on the second floor. Following his death in 1802, Linderud passed to his son-in-law Haagen Mathiesen (1759–1842) who was married to his daughter Beate Monsen (1766–1823).

In 1764 he bought a large residence at Rådhusgata in Christiania. In 1772 he was elected as one of Christiania's twelve citizen representatives and the same year he became vice mayor. He also held the title of Chancellor.

In 1790, he bought forest lands and a sawmill at Hurdal in Akershus and established trade with England, principally in pine to spruce.

== Personal life ==
In 1753 he married Marthe Holter, who died in 1754. In 1762 he married Helene Cathrine Büchler (1740–1831). He was a brother-in-law of Maren Juel, the father-in-law of Haagen Mathiesen, and great-grandfather of Haaken C. Mathiesen.
