= Haakentoppen =

Coordinates: 78°44′59″N 12°04′19″E

Haakentoppen is a mountain in Oscar II Land at Spitsbergen, Svalbard. It has a height of 870 m.a.s.l. and is located in the mountain group of Mathiesenfjella. The mountain is named after Norwegian businessman Haaken L. Mathiesen.
