= Mathiesenfjella =

Coordinates: 78.742°N 12.037°E

Mathiesenfjella is a mountain group in Oscar II Land at Spitsbergen, Svalbard. The group is named after Norwegian businessman Haaken L. Mathiesen.

The group includes the mountain of Haakentoppen, as well as the glacier of Haakenbreen.
