= Lillemor von Hanno =

Norwegian actress, novelist and playwright

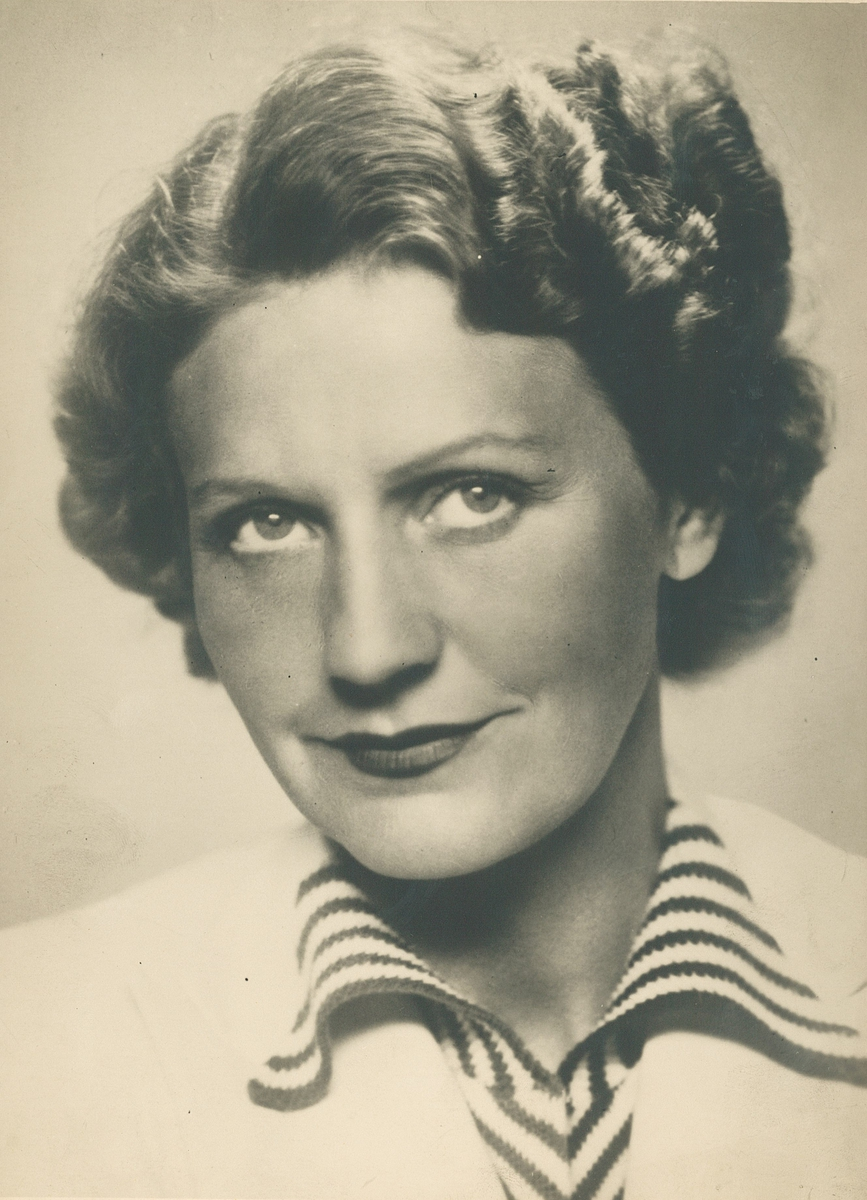
- Born: 30 December 1900; Balsfjord, Norway
- Died: 5 April 1984 (aged 83); Oslo
- Occupations: actress, novelist and playwright
- Spouses: Otto Friedrich Wilhelm von Hanno (m. 1927) Joakim Lund Ihlen (m. 1950)
- Children: Tertit von Hanno Aasland (1928-2017)
- Parent(s): Ågot Gjems Selmer; Alfred Selmer
- Awards: King's Medal of Merit in gold (1951)

Lillemor von Hanno (née Bergljot Selmer; 30 December 1900 – 5 April 1984) was a Norwegian actress, novelist, and playwright.

== Personal life ==
Von Hanno was born in Balsfjord Municipality, the daughter of the actress Ågot Gjems Selmer (1858–1926) and the physician Alfred Selmer (1851–1919). The family moved to Ås Municipality near Kristiania when she was two years old. She was the sister of the singer Tordis Gjems Selmer (1886–1964) and the actor Alfred Gjems Selmer (1893–1919). She married Major Otto Friedrich Wilhelm von Hanno (1891–1956) in 1927, and their marriage was eventually dissolved. In 1950 she married the industrialist Joakim Lund Ihlen (1899–1981).

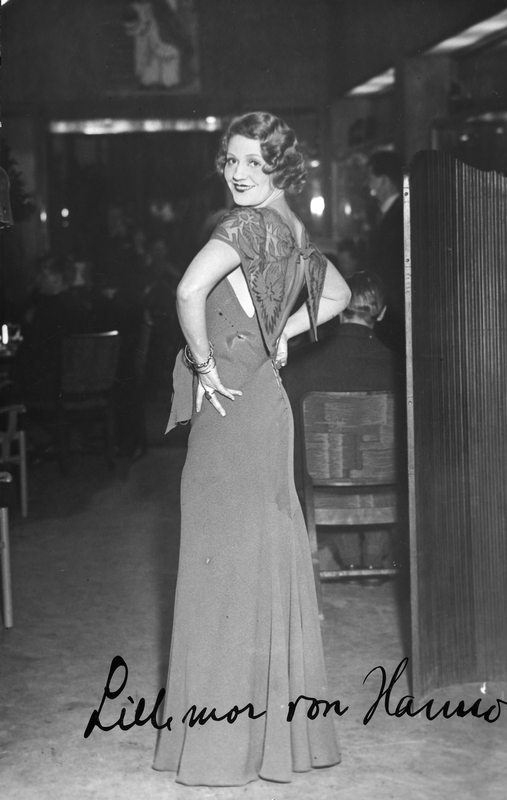
Lillemor von Hanno ca. 1930

== Career ==
Von Hanno made her stage debut in 1920 at Trondhjems nationale Scene, and later worked at Nationaltheatret, Chat Noir and Det Nye Teater. Among her books are De og vi from 1936, and Dumme menn og troll til kjerringer from 1937. She also wrote articles for the newspapers Dagbladet and Morgenbladet. Her play Leken vi lever was staged at Det Nye Teater in 1938. Among her roles at the Nationaltheatret were the title role in Noël Coward's play Madame, "Mrs. Andersen" in Johan Borgen's comedy Andersens, a priest's wife in Kaj Munk's play Egelykke, and "Kokyta" in Kjeld Abell's Dager på en sky. She participated in the film Familien på Borgan in 1939.

She also published the books Blindebukk in 1939 and Det går et år in 1940.

During the occupation of Norway by Nazi Germany she took active part in the actors' resistance. She was among the actors who were ordered by the Ministry to contribute to its broadcasting programs, but when she refused, her working permit was revoked. This incident sparked a country-wide 1941 theatre strike in Norway, which lasted for several weeks. In 1944 she fled from the occupied country to Sweden.

She was a board member of the Norwegian Actors' Equity Association for two years. She retired as a stage actor in 1951. In 1953 she staged an adaptation of Clare Boothe Luce's play The Women at Det Nye Teater, and contributed to the 1959 film Støv på hjernen.

She was awarded the King's Medal of Merit in gold in 1951. She died in Oslo on 5 April 1984.
