= Haagen Mathiesen =

Norwegian merchant, ship-owner and politician

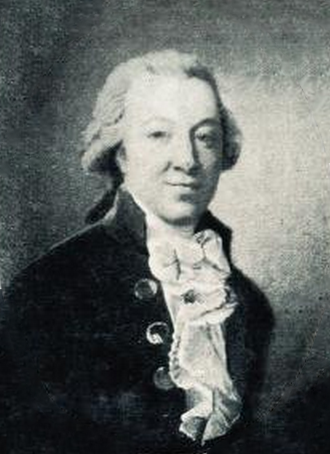
Haagen Mathiesen

Haagen Mathiesen (26 October 1759 – 12 October 1842) was a Norwegian timber merchant, ship-owner and politician.

== Background ==
He was born in Christiania (now Oslo), Norway. He was the son of timber merchant and judge Jørgen Mathiesen (1725–1764) and his wife Karen Haagensdatter Nielsen (1735–1766). He was the brother of Henriette Mathiesen. He came from a wealthy background, but lost his parents early. He graduated from Christiania Cathedral School in 1776 and then from the University of Copenhagen in 1780 with the cand.jur. degree.

== Career ==
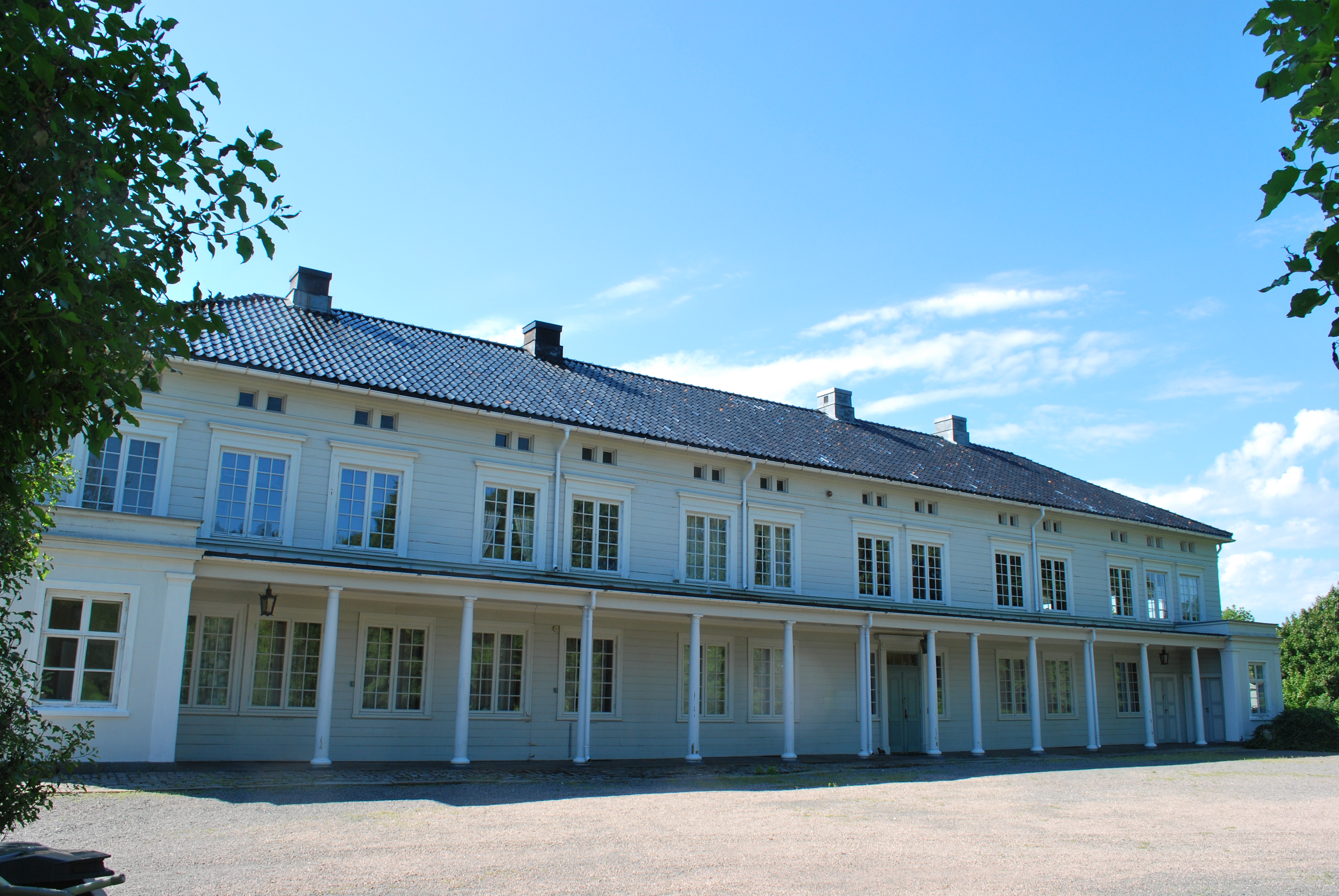
Linderud Manor

His first business venture, a dry goods store in Moss, failed. In March 1790 he married Beate Monsen (1766–1823), a daughter of Mogens Larsen Monsen. He soon involved himself in the Monsen family business, as a timber merchant and ship-owner, and bought the share of his father-in-law in 1797. In 1802 he inherited Linderud Manor previously owned by Mogens Larsen Monsen. Linderud Manor soon became the cornerstone of Mathiesen's family property, and the outtake of timber was concentrated to Hurdal, a few hours north of Linderud.

Unlike many others, Mathiesen survived the Gunboat War (1807–1814) economically, and stood out as one of the wealthiest persons in Christiania around 1814. He had helped found the Royal Frederick University in 1811, and was a member of the city commission in Christiania, a forerunner institution of the city council which came in 1837–38. He stood for general election in 1817, but failed. In 1814, when the union with Denmark was dissolved, Mathiesen campaigned for a union with Sweden, even going as far as inviting King Charles XIV John of Sweden to his manor. The union came to be after the summer's Swedish campaign against Norway, but only as a loose personal union. Disgruntled by national events, Mathiesen repatriated to Paris in 1819 and Copenhagen in 1826. Mathiesen, who previously had sided with Sweden, now pledged allegiance to the Danish state. Francis Sejersted has noted that Mathiesen followed the principle "ubi bene ibi patria".

Mathiesen was no less pragmatic when it came to his personal life. His wife and four children stayed in Norway; in Denmark he lived with former maid Anne Bue (1783–1853) and the four children they had together. Through his daughter Henriette, who died already in 1822, he was the father-in-law of Nicolai Johan Lohmann Krog.

During the period in Denmark, his business was overseen by manager Christopher Henrik Holfeldt Tostrup. In addition, his son Mogens Larsen Mathiesen (1799–1875) eventually became involved.

== Legacy ==
As Haagen Mathiesen died in 1842 at Copenhagen, the company was taken over by Tostrup and Mogens Larsen Mathiesen as partners under the name Tostrup & Mathiesen. However, Mogens Mathiesen was an inactive partner and transferred his shares to his son Haaken C. Mathiesen in 1849. The Tostrup family left the company in 1892, and when Eidsvold Værk was bought in 1893, the company Mathiesen Eidsvold Værk was shaped. Haagen's great-grandson Haaken L. Mathiesen took over in 1895.

== See also ==
- Mathiesen family
