= Haakenbreen =

Glacier in Svalbard, Norway

Coordinates: 78.747°N 11.987°E

Haakenbreen is a glacier in Oscar II Land at Spitsbergen, Svalbard. It is situated in the mountain group of Mathiesenfjella. The glacier is named after Norwegian businessman Haaken L. Mathiesen.
