= Wincentz Thurmann Ihlen =

Norwegian engineer and industrialist

Wincentz Thurmann Ihlen (2 May 1826 – 18 January 1892) was a Norwegian engineer and industrialist.

He was born in Holmestrand as the son of Nils Ihlen and Barbara Wincentz Thurmann. His brother Jacob Thurmann Ihlen was a politician. In November 1852 Wincentz married Birgitte Elisabeth Mørch, granddaughter of Constitutional founding father Ole Clausen Mørch, and the couple had one daughter and three sons. His oldest son Nils Claus Ihlen would become a member of the national parliament and Minister of Foreign Affairs.

During the 1860s Ihlen started as an entrepreneur and bought several local enterprises and real estate. This included the farms at Haneborg, Granholt and Vittenberg, and the Nordby saw mill. Based at Fjellhamar Farm in Lørenskog, he built up a major complex of saw mills and grain mills, establishing the first industrial complex in Lørenskog. The background for the establishment was the new railway line that ran past Lørenskog, giving easy access to lumber from the inner parts of the country, as well as to the port in Oslo. The mills were owned proprietorially until they incorporated as the limited company A/S Fjeldhammer Brug in 1893, and the company has today become part of Icopal.

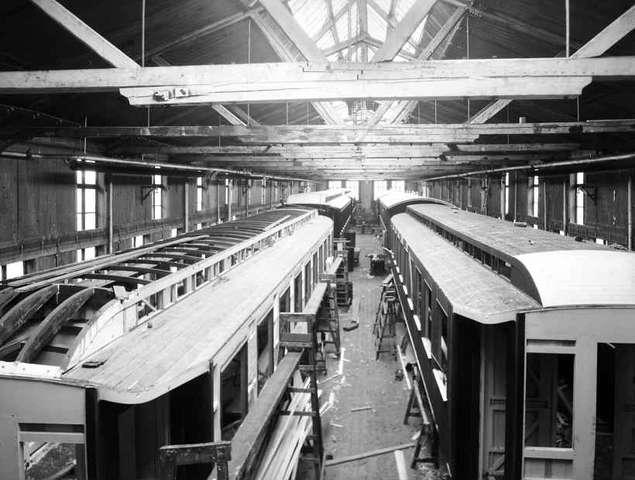
Manufacturing train cars in 1924

Wincentz Thurmann Ihlen established his own mechanical workshop and iron works at Strømmen in 1873, under the name W. Ihlen, Strømmen. The main product was railway cars, with the first being produced in 1874. After Wincentz's retirement the Ihlen family retained ownership of the company, with Nils Claus taking over the works in 1883, changing the name to Strømmens Værksted, and his sons Joakim and Alf Ihlen in 1908, who transformed it to a limited company.

He died in 1892 in Kristiania.
