= Christian Pierre Mathiesen =

Norwegian politician (1870–1953)

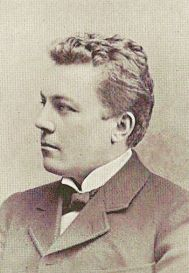

Minister of Agriculture
- In office 22 October 1903 – 26 September 1904
- Prime Minister: Francis Hagerup
- Preceded by: Gunnar Knudsen
- Succeeded by: Johan E. Mellbye

Member of the Norwegian Parliament
- In office 1 January 1901 – 31 December 1903
- Constituency: Akershus

Personal details
- Born: 14 April 1870 Christiania, United Kingdoms of Sweden and Norway
- Died: 8 August 1953 (aged 83) Våler, Hedmark, Norway
- Party: Conservative
- Spouse: Celina Ihlen (m. 1894)
- Children: Haaken C. Mathiesen jr.

Christian Pierre Mathiesen (14 April 1870 – 8 August 1953) was a Norwegian landowner and politician for the Conservative Party.

== Background ==
He was born in Kristiania (now Oslo), Norway, as the youngest son of landowner and industrialist Haaken C. Mathiesen. He finished his secondary education in 1888, graduated from the agricultural school at Sem in 1890 and also took agricultural education in Denmark. He was the owner of Linderud Manor from 1893, while his oldest brother Haaken L. Mathiesen inherited the family company Mathiesen Eidsvold Værk. In 1940 he passed Linderud Manor down to his nephew, another Mathiesen Eidsvold Værk inheritor, Jørgen Mathiesen.

== Career ==
Having many political positions in Aker Municipality, Mathiesen was elected to the Parliament of Norway in 1900 from the constituency Akershus Amt. He served one term. On 22 October 1903, when the Hagerup's Second Cabinet assumed office, he was appointed as the new Minister of Agriculture. He lasted until 25 September 1904, when he was replaced by Johan Egeberg Mellbye.

He was also the chairman of Fællesslagteriet from 1911 to 1936, Akers Sparebank from 1918 to 1945, Fellesbanken from 1921 to 1928 as well as Forsikringsselskapet Norden. He was a supervisory council member of the Royal Norwegian Society for Development.

== Personal life ==
He was married to Celina Ihlen (1874–1948), a daughter of Conservative Party co-founder Jacob Thurmann Ihlen and his Belgian wife Ambrosine Rouquet. They had the son Haaken C. Mathiesen, Jr. Christian Pierre Mathiesen was decorated as a Knight, First Class of the Order of St. Olav and Commander, First Class of the Order of the Dannebrog. He died in 1953.

Political offices
| Preceded by Gunnar Knudsen | Norwegian Minister of Agriculture; 1903–1904 | Succeeded by Johan Egeberg Mellbye |
