= Matthiessen =

Matthiessen is a Danish-Norwegian patronymic surname meaning "son of Mathies" (equivalent of the Biblical Μαθθαιος, cf. English Matthew). Several spelling variants are used, including Matthiesen, Mathiesen, Matthissen (UK), Matthisen and Mathissen. A similar diversity of forms exist for the parallel given name Mathias. There are several people with the surname Matthiessen:

- Augustus Matthiessen (1831–1870), British physicist and chemist, notable for Matthiessen's rule
- C. M. I. M. Matthiessen (born 1956), Swedish linguist
- Francis Otto Matthiessen (1902–1950), U.S. literary critic
- Frederick William Matthiessen (1835–1918), Industrialist, philanthropist, and former Mayor of LaSalle, Illinois
- Peter Matthiessen (1927–2014), American novelist
