= Dennis Mathiasen =

Danish handball player (born 1981)

Personal information
- Full name: Dennis Mathiasen
- Nationality: Danish (Denmark)
- Born: 12 July 1981 (age 45) Rask Mølle, Hedensted, Danmark
- Height: 193 cm (76 in)

Sport
- Sport: Handball
- Position: Right Back
- Number: 15

Youth career
- Years: Team
- –: HK 73
- –: Rask Mølle

Senior clubs
- Years: Team
- 2000-2010: Skjern Håndbold
- 2010: Ribe-Esbjerg HH (loan)
- 2010-2013: Ribe-Esbjerg HH

Dennis Mathiasen (born 12 July 1981) is a Danish former handballer, who played most of his career for Danish Handball League side Skjern Håndbold, where he is considered an icon. He played for the club for 10 years, and was a part of the team as they won the EHF Challenge Cup in 2002 and 2003, the only two international titles for the club.

In 2010 he joined Ribe-Esbjerg HH on a half year loan in the Danish 1st Division. After the loan he joined the club permanently. In the 2011–12 season he was promoted with the team to the top division. He retired in 2013.

His brother, Ronnie Mathiassen, is also a handball player.
