= Jørgen Mathiesen =

Norwegian landowner and businessperson (1901–1993)

Jørgen Arthur Mathiesen (9 July 1901 – 6 December 1993) was a Norwegian landowner and businessperson in the forestry sector.

He was born in Eidsvoll as the son of landowner Haaken L. Mathiesen (1858–1930) and his wife Erikka Kiær (1866–1929). His maternal grandfather was Anders Ferrand Kiær, and his paternal grandfather was Haaken C. Mathiesen. Also, he was a nephew of politician Christian Pierre Mathiesen.

Mathiesen started his career in the family company Mathiesen Eidsvold Værk, having finished his secondary education in 1919. After undertaking some extra studies, he became a company manager in the 1920s and sole owner in 1930. Affected by the economic problems of the interwar period in Norway, the company was heavily indebted, but it survived. Mathiesen cooperated with innovative foresters, and managed to rationalize. He stepped down as company leader in the 1950s to let his son take over. His son, Haaken Severin Mathiesen (1926–1997) had been co-owner since 1946.

Mathiesen was interested in genealogy and heraldry, and was a co-founder of the Norwegian Heraldry Society as well as the first Norwegian member of the Académie Internationale d'Héraldique. He was a member of the board of directors of the Norwegian Museum of Decorative Arts and Design, Nansenskolen and Oslo City Museum, deputy board member of Det norske Myrselskap and an honorary member of the Norwegian Forestry Society. He was decorated with several orders of knighthood; he was a Commander of the Royal Norwegian Order of St. Olav, the Danish Order of the Dannebrog, the Finnish Order of the Lion and the Swedish Order of Vasa. He was also a Grand Knight of the Icelandic Order of the Falcon. He was a member of the gentlemen's club SK Fram since 1936.

Between October 1925 and 1956 he was married to Maren Johanne Løvenskiold. They were divorced, and from April 1956 he was married to Christine Lovén, née Aall. Having inherited the manor Linderud in 1940, he lived there for the second half of his life. He died in December 1993 in Nannestad.
