= Joakim Ihlen =

Norwegian industrialist (1899–1981)

- Born: 22 March 1899; Skedsmo, Norway
- Died: 15 September 1981 (aged 82)
- Occupation: Industrialist
- Spouse: Lillemor von Hanno (second wife)
- Father: Nils Claus Ihlen
- Relatives: Alf Ihlen (brother)

Joakim Lund Ihlen (22 March 1899 – 15 September 1981) was a Norwegian industrialist. He was born in Skedsmo, the son of engineer and politician Nils Claus Ihlen. He was co-manager of the workshop Strømmens Værksted for nearly fifty years, along with his brother Alf Ihlen.

He was married three times; his second wife was actress Lillemor von Hanno.
