= Linderud =

Neighborhood in Oslo, Norway

Coordinates: 59°56′30.746″N 10°50′0.74040″E

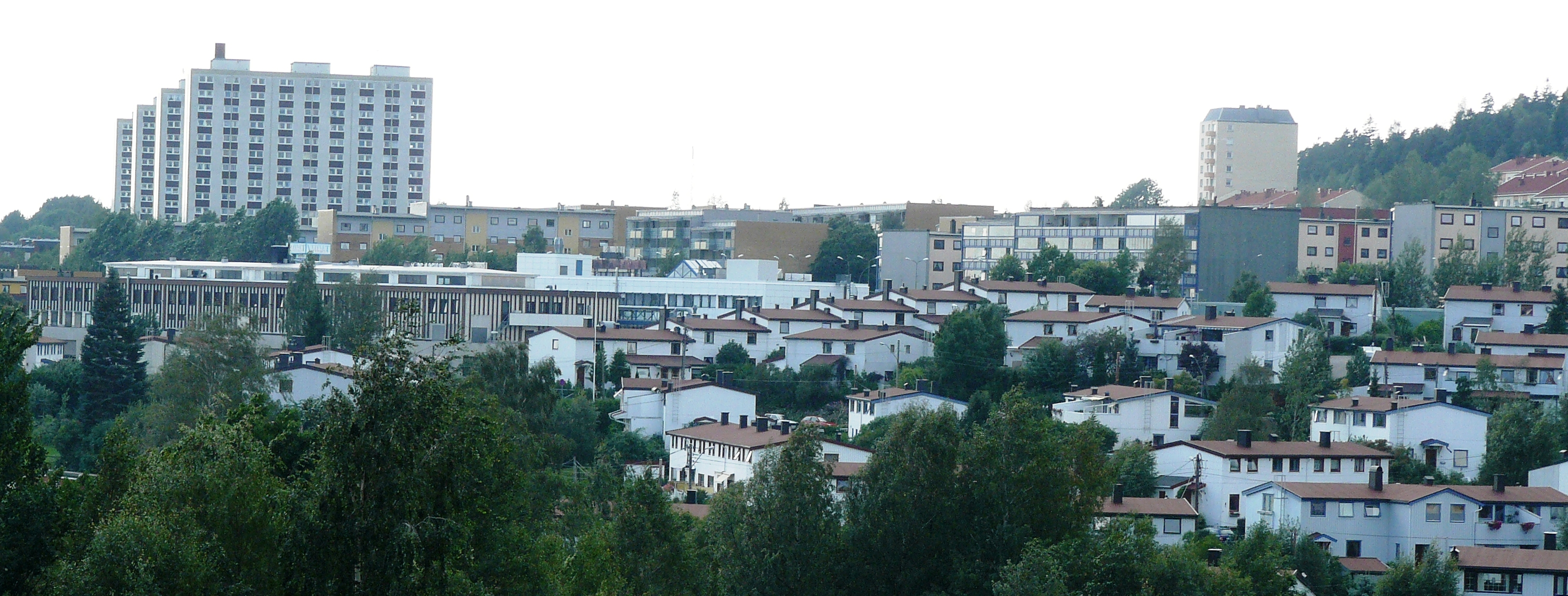
Overview of Linderud and the adjacent neighborhood Veitvet.

Linderud is a neighborhood in Bjerke borough, Oslo, Norway. The area originally formed part of the estate of Linderud Manor.

== Linderud Manor ==
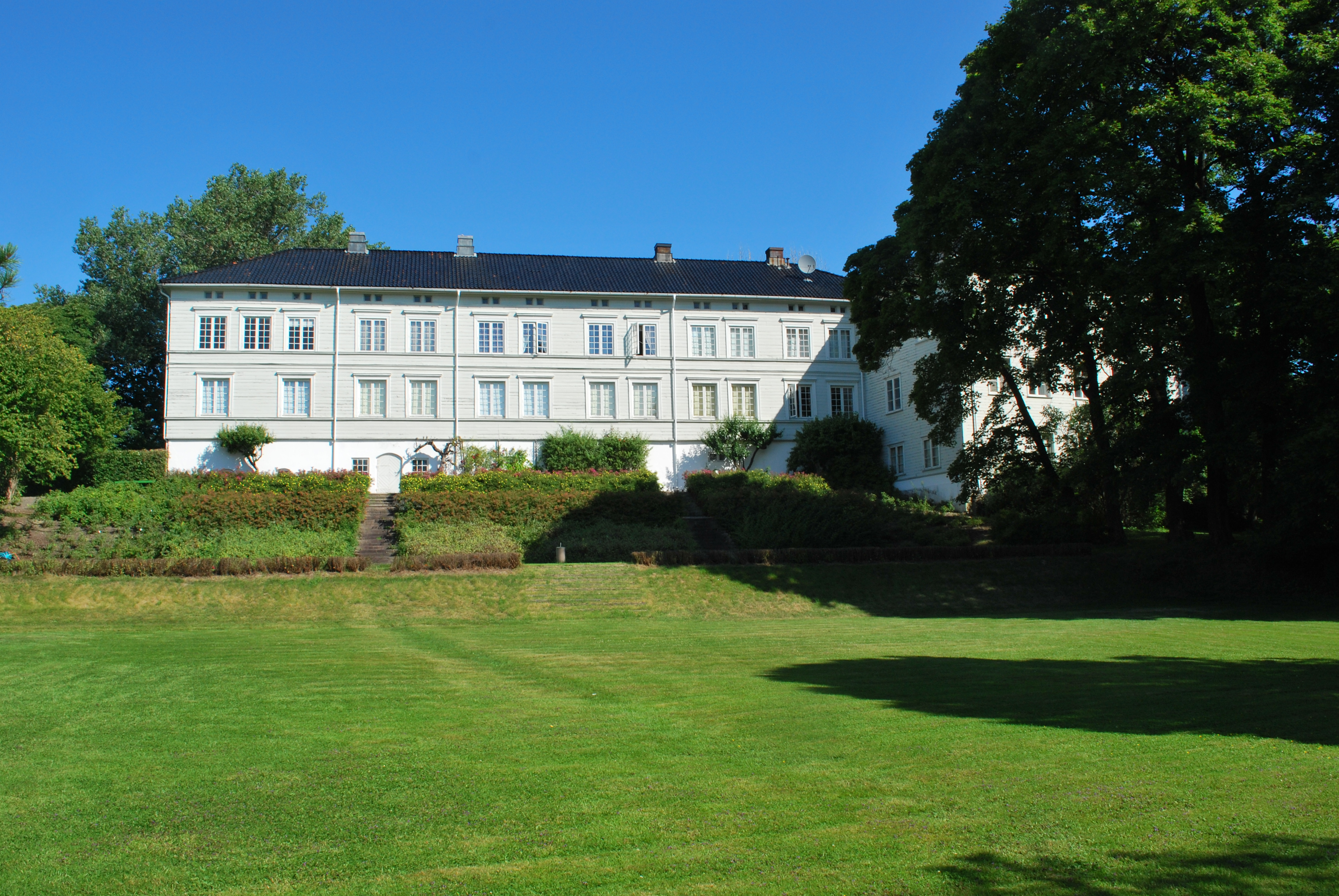
Linderud Manor, main building and the upper part of the garden

Linderud Manor (Linderud gård) was owned by the Catholic Church before the Reformation of 1536, and thereafter by the Crown. It was bought by Peder Griffenfeldt in 1673, then by Mogens Lauritzen in 1679, and belonged to the latter's family for over a century. By the late eighteenth century, the manor was a part of a property which included vast amounts of forest, some timber industrial sites and about 350 farms.

Lauritzen's ancestor Mogens Larsen Monsen passed it down to his son-in-law Haagen Mathiesen in 1802. Later owners include Haaken C. Mathiesen from 1875 to 1891, Christian Pierre Mathiesen from 1893 to 1940 and Jørgen Mathiesen from 1940. Jørgen Mathiesen set up the Linderud Foundation in 1954, which now owns the main building of the manor as well as the surrounding park. Since 1960 parts of the park are preserved due to botanical value.

== Neighborhood ==
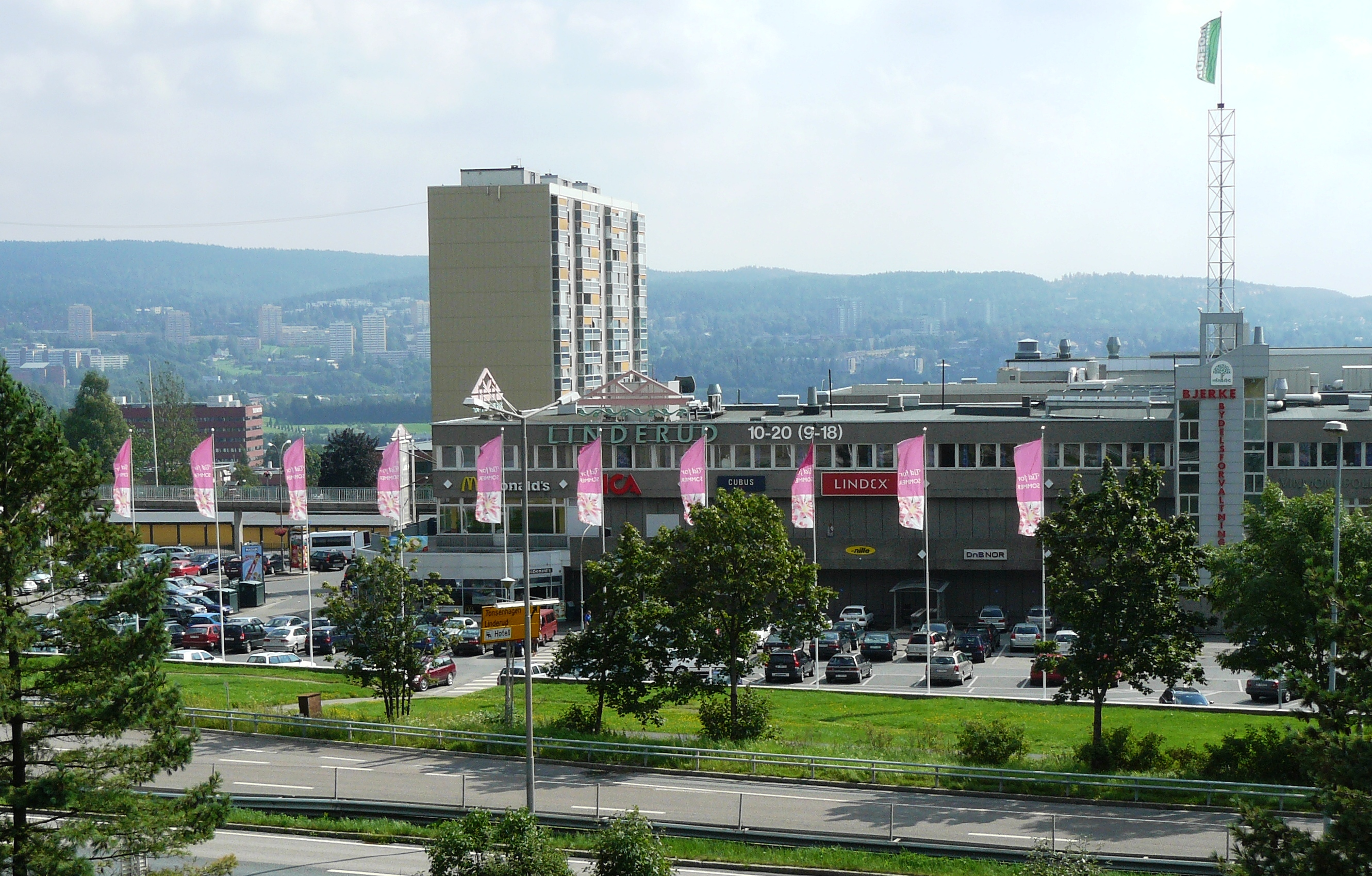
Linderud shopping mall.

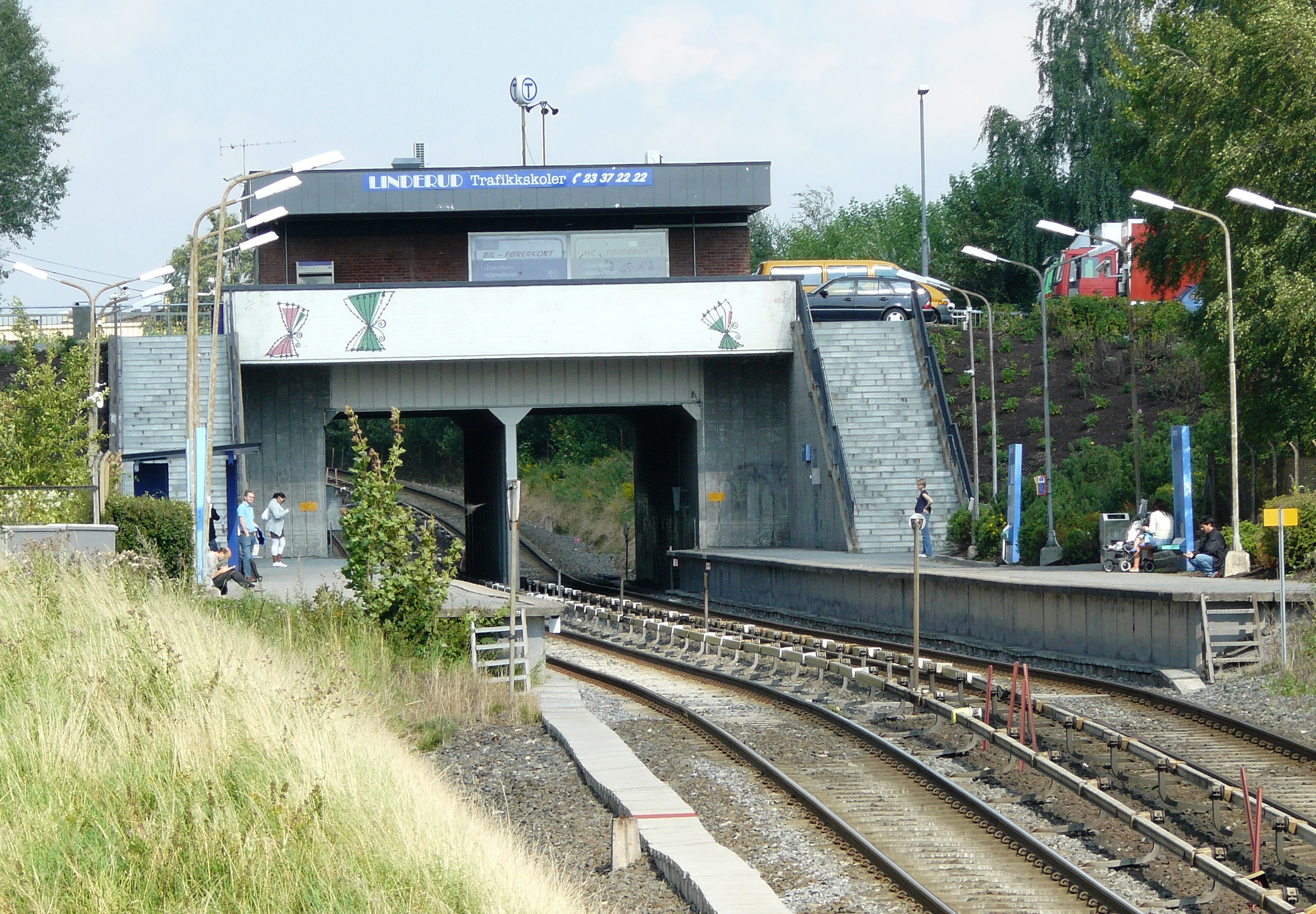
Linderud station.

The farmland surrounding Linderud manor was largely built in the 1950s and 1960s, eventually forming an urban neighborhood. A primary and a secondary school were constructed between 1964 and 1968, although a school had existed in conjunction with the farming community between 1860 and 1900. The Norwegian Military Academy is located at Linderud as well. The shopping mall Linderud senter was opened in 1968, and enlarged in 1992 and 2009. Since 1966 the neighborhood is served by Linderud station of the Oslo T-bane network.

=== Sports ===
The ski jumping hill Linderudkollen share name with the area. It actually consists of four hills, constructed in 1931, 1965 and 1995, the largest with a calculation point of seventy metres. In 2009 the quarterpipe competition Arctic Challenge was staged there. The local multi-sports team is Linderud IL, founded on 13 December 1967, which has sections for association football, team handball, floor hockey and skiing.
