= Alf Ihlen =

Norwegian industrialist (1900–2006)

- Born: 30 June 1900; Skedsmo, Norway
- Died: 6 April 2006 (aged 105)
- Occupation: Industrialist
- Father: Nils Claus Ihlen
- Relatives: Joakim Ihlen (brother)

Alf Ihlen (30 June 1900 – 6 April 2006) was a Norwegian industrialist.

He was born in Skedsmo, as a son of engineer and politician Nils Claus Ihlen and Henriette Marie Lund. He was co-manager of the workshop Strømmens Værksted for about fifty years, along with his brother Joakim Ihlen. The two brothers developed their company into a world leading producer of aluminium based vehicles in the 1930s.

He was inducted into the Norwegian Academy of Science and Letters in 1954.

Non-profit organization positions
Preceded by Edgar B. Schieldrop	Chairman of the Norwegian Polytechnic Society; 1932–1935	Succeeded by Thomas Bendixen
