= Moelven Industrier =

Scandinavian industrial group

- Industry: sawmilling and planing of wood
- Founded: August 14, 1899
- Headquarters: Moelv, Norway
- Area served: Global
- Number of employees: 66 (2026)
- Website: moelven.com

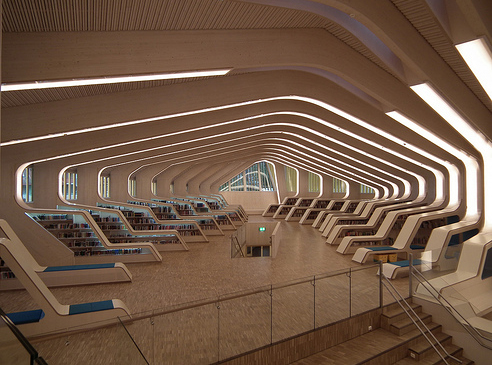
The library in Vennesla build of glulam girders supplied by Moelven

Moelven Industrier ASA is a Scandinavian industrial group owned by Glommen Mjøsen Skog SA (78,84 %), Viken Skog SA (20,80 %) and Allskog SA (0,08 %). The remaining 0.28% is owned by private shareholders. The Moelven Group supplies wood-based building products and systems for the construction industry. The business focuses primarily on the Scandinavian market and consists of 34 production companies in a number of product areas.

A significant proportion of Moelven's plants are concentrated in the forest-rich regions of Western Central Sweden and Southeast Norway. There is a short distance from raw material to manufacturing facility and on to the large Scandinavian markets, which represent around 80 percent of sales income. The Group has approx. 3,200 employees and an annual turnover of NOK 11 billion.

== Products ==
Moelvens products and services are sold to customers in three main segments: the processing industry, retail and construction activities. Moelven is therefore organized according to these customer groups, and not according to processes. Moelvens three divisions are:

1. Moelven Timber, which produces industrial timber in the shape of dimensional timber and fabricated industrial components, as well as sawn timber.
2. Moelven Wood, which develops and produces a large range of wood-based building and interior products with a high level of processing.
3. Moelven Building Systems, which consists of laminated timber, modular buildings and interior solutions.
