= Haaken L. Mathiesen =

Norwegian businessman (1858–1930)

Haaken Larpent Mathiesen (7 April 1858 – 5 October 1930) was a Norwegian landowner and businessperson in the forestry sector.

== Biography ==
He was born in Christiania as the son of landowner Haaken C. Mathiesen (1827–1913) and his wife Anna Sophie Josephine Larpent (1833–1863). He was a brother of politician Christian Pierre Mathiesen, nephew of art collector Sophus Larpent, and a great-grandson of Haagen Mathiesen.

His family owned the manor Linderud as well as large forests in Eidsvoll and Hurdal. Mathiesen intended to become a military officer, but as his older brother died in 1875, it fell upon him to inherit the family company. After a period of education, his first foray into business was the foundation of the company Nilsen, Mathiesen & Co. in Fredrikstad in 1883, together with Anthon B. Nilsen. The company was dissolved in 1893, though a small remnant existed, managed by Haaken Mathiesen's younger half-brother Arthur. In the same year, Haaken Mathiesen joined forces with his father and bought Eidsvold Værk, creating the company Mathiesen Eidsvold Værk which still exists today. He was the sole owner from 1895, and under his leadership the company ventured into the pulp and paper industry. He was also among the founders of Orkla Gruber in 1904, and also invested in Sydvaranger and Store Norske Spitsbergen Kulkompani.

He was a Commander, First Class of the Royal Norwegian Order of St. Olav and the Danish Order of the Dannebrog, as well as a Grand Officer of the Monegasque Order of St. Charles. He knew the Prince of Monaco from an investment venture in Portuguese East Africa. Mathiesen was also a close friend of Crown Prince Gustaf of Sweden, but nonetheless supported the dissolution of the union between Norway and Sweden in 1905.

In January 1891 he married Erikka Cappelen Kiær (1866–1929), a daughter of Anders Ferrand Kiær. Their son Jørgen Mathiesen inherited the family business, starting as a manager in the 1920s. He had to cope with debt problems, which came to be as a part of the general economic hardships of the World War I and the interwar period. Haaken Mathiesen died in October 1930 in Eidsvoll. His son became the sole company owner, managed to survive economically and passed the company down to his son in the 1950s.

Tha mountain group of Mathiesenfjella and the mountain Haakentoppen at Spitsbergen, Svalbard, are named after him, and also the glacier of Haakenbreen.
