= Haaken C. Mathiesen =

Norwegian landowner and businessperson

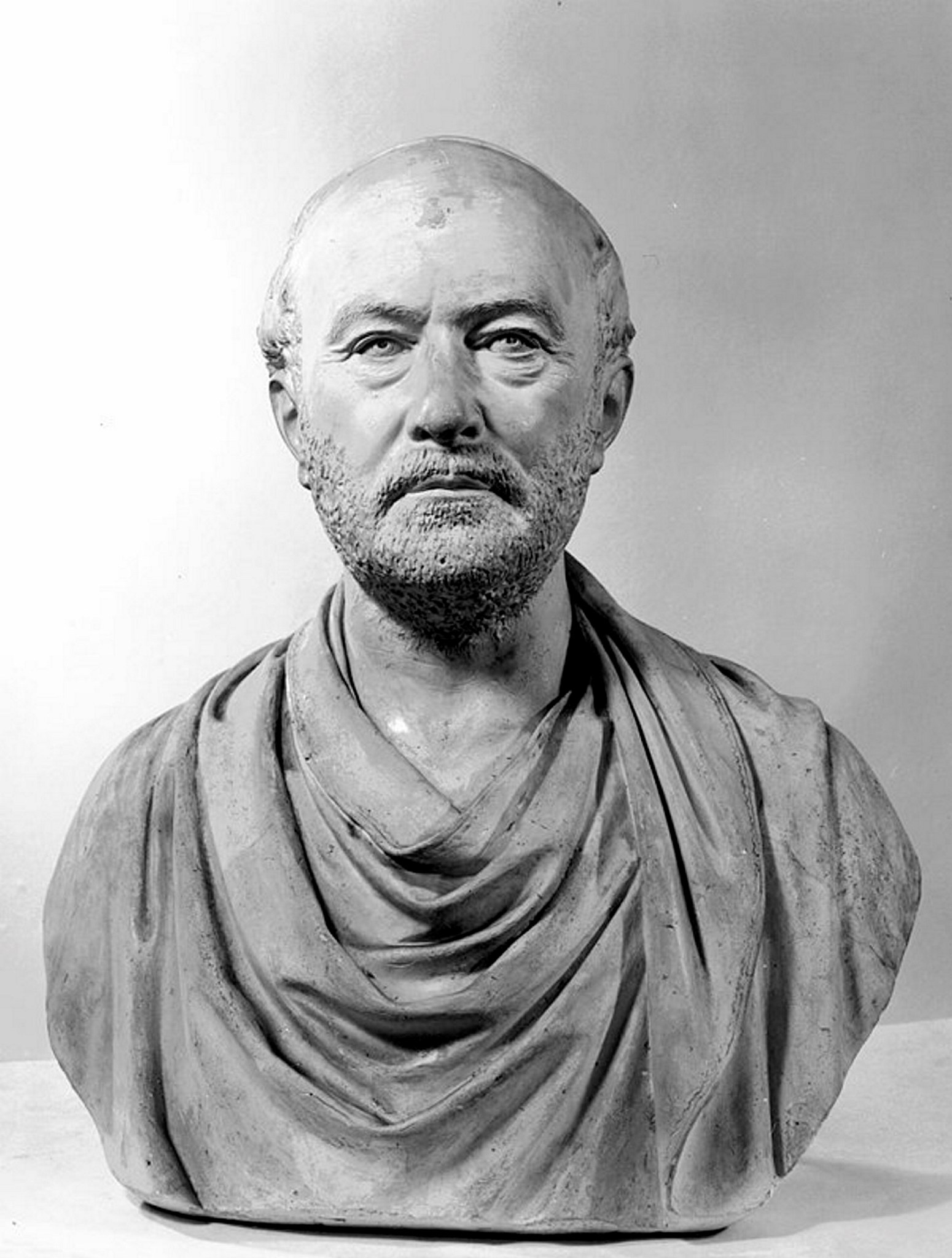
A bust of Mathiesen created by Olaf Olafsen Glosimodt.

Haaken Christian Mathiesen (24 February 1827 – 10 September 1913) was a Norwegian landowner and businessperson in the forestry sector.

== Personal life ==
He was born on Linderud manor as the son of landowner Mogens Larsen Mathiesen (1799–1875) and his wife Johanne Hedevig Gløersen (1800–1885). He was a grandson of Haagen Mathiesen and a great-grandson of Mogens Larsen Monsen, and a first cousin of the three siblings Dikka Møller, Herman Anker, Christian August Anker as well as Sophus Larpent.

Mathiesen was married twice. From September 1853 he was married to his first cousin—and Sophus Larpent's sister—Anna Sophie Josephine Larpent, but she died in February 1863. He then married another sister, Louise Julie Jeanette Larpent, in March 1866. She died in October 1875. By his first wife he had the son Haaken L. Mathiesen.

== Career ==
Mathiesen was born into a family of landed proprietors. In the early nineteenth century, they expanded from their base at Linderud, buying large forests in Eidsvoll and Hurdal. His grandfather died in 1842, and as his father retreated from the family company already in 1849, Haaken C. Mathiesen became a co-owner in the company Tostrup & Mathiesen together with manager Christopher Henrik Holfeldt Tostrup. By that time he had taken a few years of education abroad.

The timber industry was booming at the time, and the opening of the Main Line in 1854 provided for transport to Christiania. Mathiesen was especially interested in the growing pulp industry. He cooperated with his cousin Christian Anker, and invested in Union near Skien as well as several other ventures. The Tostrup family left the company in 1892, and when Eidsvold Værk was bought in 1893, the company Mathiesen Eidsvold Værk was shaped.

His son Haaken L. Mathiesen became the sole company owner in 1895, and in 1930 his son Jørgen Mathiesen became sole owner. For his efforts Haaken C. Mathiesen was decorated as a Knight, First Class of the Royal Norwegian Order of St. Olav and a Commander of the Danish Order of the Dannebrog. He died at Linderud manor, which he owned between 1875 and 1891 (selling it to his youngest son Christian Pierre Mathiesen), in September 1913.
