= Mathiesen Eidsvold Værk =

Norwegian industrial company

Mathiesen Eidsvold Værk ANS (MEV) is a Norwegian industrial company, owned by the Mathiesen industrial family, and historically one of the largest timber companies of Norway, and arguably Europe.

The company's roots date back to 1671. From 1842 to 1892, the company was known as Tostrup & Mathiesen and owned by the Mathiesen and Tostrup families. The heir to the Tostrup family's shares sold it to the Mathiesen family, and it was renamed Mathiesen Eidsvold Værk in 1892. In the 1840s, the company established its headquarters in Paris, although it was since relocated to Norway.

In 1994, Mathiesen Eidsvold Værk's timber branch was sold and continued under the name Moelven Industrier. The company is currently owned by Haaken Eric Mathiesen.

== See also ==
- Mathiesen family
