= AN/GPA-37 Course Directing Group =

The GE AN/GPA-37 Course Directing Group was a USAF Cold War air defense command, control, and coordination system for weapons direction (ground-controlled interception). During Air Defense Command's "Control Capability Improvement Program" to improve command guidance of crewed aircraft, the AN/GPA-37 was "developed by the General Electric Heavy Military Electronic Equipment Department at Syracuse in conjunction with...Rome Air Development Center and the Electronics Research Laboratories of Columbia University." Used to process radar data, the system was to "track a potential enemy aircraft and direct intercepters [sic] into a position from which they can make their automatic firing runs", the system included the:

- AN/GPA-34 Converter Group for processing radar data,
- AN/GPA-23 Computing-Tracking Group with analog computer for "automatically providing the solution of the interception problem" (developed at Columbia University),
- AN/GKA-1 Flight Control Group for "automatic communications between ground installation and intercepter" (e.g., "verbally to the pilot"),
- and for modified systems, AN/GPA-67 Time Division Data Link equipment** for input of the SAGE TDDL data stream into the Flight Control Group

The Secretary of Defense concurred on October 30, 1956, for deployment of the AN/GPA-37 as an interim "pre-SAGE semiautomatic intercept system" to Air Defense Direction Centers (ADDCs) (e.g., in ADC's Zone of the Interior) prior to fielding the SAGE System with AN/FST-2, AN/FSQ-7, & AN/FSQ-8 equipment.

The forecast dates for NCCs with both AN/FSG-1 & AN/GPA-37 systems ranged from November 1959 for Fort Lawton (Seattle Air Defense Sector) to October 1960 Gibbsboro (Philadelphia).

After the planned Super Combat Centers for 10 underground air defense sites were cancelled in 1960,* the AN/GPA-37 was redeployed as the dispersed Back-Up Interceptor Control (BUIC) prior to development of BUIC II (Burroughs AN/GSA-51 Radar Course Directing Group). BUIC was for degraded SAGE operations when "a DC and the adjacent DC's were all out and responsibility had to be exercised by the division commander through the NORAD control center". By 1959, the military technical school for the AN/GPA-73 was at Keesler Air Force Base.

In accordance with the Joint Electronics Type Designation System (JETDS), the "AN/GPA-37" designation represents the 37th design of an Army-Navy electronic device for ground radar auxiliary system. The JETDS system also now is used to name all Department of Defense electronic systems.

== See also ==
- List of radars
- List of military electronics of the United States

== Notes ==
*"General Partridge replied on 2 July 1959 that the NORAD requirement for a non-SAGE back-up method of exercising operational control of all weapons was valid until the SCC system was operational and could not be withdrawn.

**NCCs were at Missile Masters for "the Los Angeles, Seattle, Chicago, Detroit, Boston, Washington-Baltimore, New York, and Buffalo areas. NORAD added San Francisco, at which there was no NCC, but at which, NORAD said, one would be established. ... NORAD required an AN/GPA-67 at each of these NCC's so as to provide a capability for control of Time Division Data Link-equipped interceptors when the sector converted to TDDL."
