= Fort Heath radar station =

Radar station

- Winthrop, Massachusetts, Massachusetts, 1960-1962: Chicago-Gary; 1962-1974: New England, Army Air Defense Command
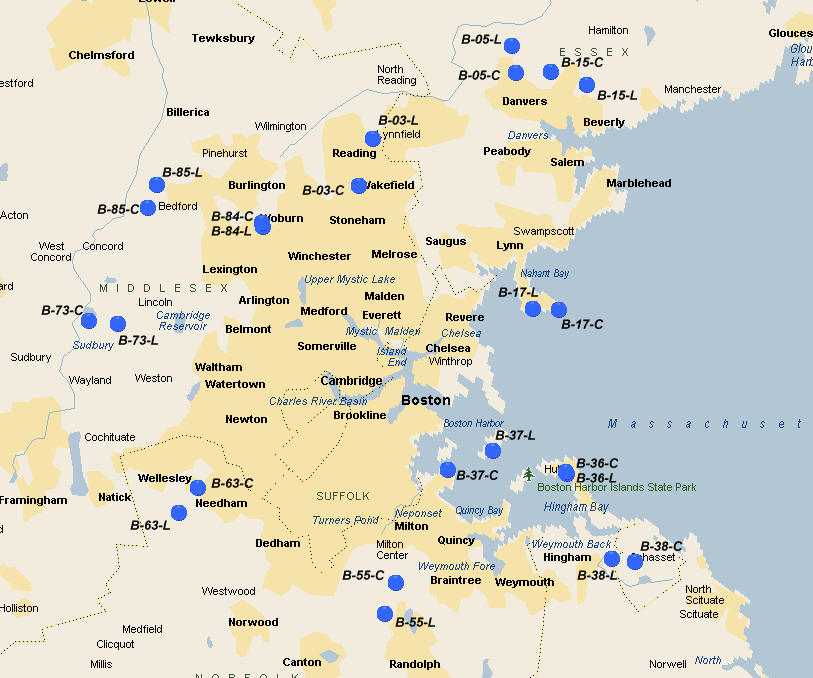
- The Fort Heath Direction Center for the Boston Defense Area (planned as the "Boston-Providence" area) controlled Nike batteries transferred to the National Guard (B-03, 15, 55, & 63 in 1959 and 36 & 73 in 1964)--Nike Hercules sites B-05, 36, & 73 remained after the Nike Ajax sites closed.

Site information
- Type: Fort

Location
- The DC was in the nuclear bunker, the largest building of the radar station.

The Fort Heath radar station was a USAF radar site and US Army Missile Master installation of the joint-use site system (JUSS) for North American Air Defense at a former coastal defense site. The Cold War radar station had 2 USAF AN/FPS-6B height finding radars, 2 Army AN/FPS-6A height finders, an FAA ARSR-1 radar emplaced 1958-9, and an Army nuclear bunker. Arctic Towers were the pedestals for the FPS antennas and radomes, while the Air Route Surveillance Radar was on a 50-foot extension temperate tower adjacent to the Federal Aviation Administration building.

For Boston Air Defense Sector operations (e.g., for radar tracks supporting the 26th ADMS BOMARC surface-to-air missile site at 41°40′56″N 070°32′21″W), the USAF also used an Air Defense Command operations shelter (42°23′20″N 070°58′10″W) for controlling the FPS-6Bs to process height requests from the sector's "Air Defense Control and Coordination System" (DC-02). Activated at the fort in 1959 was the headquarters for the 820th Radar Squadron which, instead of being designated a "SAGE" radar squadron as with other units, was renamed an AC&W Sq in 1961. The 820th Aircraft Control and Warning Squadron inactivated in 1962 after the operation—instead of using a "P" (Permanent) or "Z" (SAGE) designation as with other NORAD/ADC sites—had used the "MM-1" designation for the ADDC planned for collocation with the Army's 3rd operational Missile Master.

== Planned Air Defense Direction Center ==
The Ft Heath "Joint Manual Direction Center" was planned by January 24, 1957, and the site plan was approved on October 31, 1957. NORAD/CONAD used the "MM-1" designation for the JMDC in the June 1958 historical summary. The summary estimated the AADCP and USAF ADDC would be operational in August 1960 with "Air Force operating consoles" in the Army bunker after the estimated March 1960 installation of the ARSR-1. An AN/GPA-37 Course Directing Group installation was to be completed by April 1960 to allow manual USAF ADDC ground-controlled intercept operations until SAGE DC-02 was operational for the Boston Air Defense Sector (forecast August 1960). The modification to the ARSR-1A configuration (Amplitron, "antenna gear box modification", etc.) was to be complete by November 1960.

Radar station construction had begun by September 22, 1959, and by the end of 1959, Ft Heath was designated to be a Category 1a NORAD Control Center with the AN/GPA-37 to have the data processing computer for the SAGE TDDL to/from equipped interceptors. However, since Ft Heath ADDC operation would have only been used for a few months until SAGE DC-02 had ground-controlled interception capability, the AN/GPA-37 installation was never completed. For the SAGE/Missile Master test program, NORAD requested an abbreviated AN/FSG-1 "be made available…in the Boston area by 1 Ju.l.y 1959" and during Ft Heath bunker construction, 5 of 7 Glenn L. Martin pallets of FSG-1 equipment were assembled at the nearby Fort Banks for testing with the Experimental SAGE Subsector (XD-1 prototype AN/FSQ-7 at Lexington, Massachusetts) for the Second Phase NORAD SAGE/Missile Master test (September 1959) to assess the Automatic Targeting and Battery Evaluation algorithm.

=== Missile Master nuclear bunker ===
The Fort Heath Direction Center (B-21DC) was the Army Air Defense Command Post for the Boston Defense Area housed in the partially underground nuclear bunker and staffed by the Air Defense Brigade headquartered at Fort Banks. To network the local "Missile Master organic radars" and several remote Nike batteries' radars, the Direction Center (DC) became operational c. April 1960 at the site formerly used by the MIT research building. The DC included a Martin AN/FSG-1 Antiaircraft Defense System with consoles and overhead displays of the tactical display and tracking subsystems within an Antiaircraft Operations Center ("Blue Room") recessed in a pit with a stage. Instead of an underground decontamination water supply beneath the AAOC as with the nominal bunker plan, the Army Corps of Engineers (New England District) had exterior emergency water tanks built in addition to a 210,000 gallon freshwater tank. The typical FSG-1 crew was 22 soldiers and 5 company grade officers, and the bunker had an office for the Army Air Defense Commander.

In 1962 the Boston Defense Area merged with the Hartford and Providence areas to become the New England Defense Area, and in early 1965 the vacuum tube AN/FSG-1 was replaced with a solid-state Martin AN/GSG-5 BIRDIE (than a Hughes AN/TSQ-51 by July 1968). The "control site" was demolished in 1969 (the bunker remained in 1971), and after a Rhode Island AN/TSQ-51 had opened by July 1, 1970, Project Concise closed the remaining Nike batteries in 1974.

The site of the former radar station now includes a small park and a complex of large apartment buildings.
