= NORAD Control Center =

- Alternative names: Joint Manual Direction Center; Joint Fire Direction Center; NORAD sector direction center

General information
- Status: Defunct
- Type: Military installation
- Location: United States
- Owner: North American Air Defense Command

NORAD Control Centers (NCCs) were Cold War "joint direction centers" for command, control, and coordination of ground-controlled interception by both USAF Air Defense Command (ADC) and Army Air Defense Command (ARADCOM). The Joint Manual Steering Group was "formed by the Army and Air Force in July 1957 to support…collocation" of USAF Air Defense Direction Centers and Army Air Defense Command Posts, which began after a January 28, 1958, ADC/ARADCOM meeting with NORAD to "collocate the Fairchild-Geiger facilities" (operations began on May 15, 1958.) Army contracts for 5 NCCs had been let by August 17, 1958, after 1956 DoD approval for collocation of interim "pre-SAGE semiautomatic intercept systems" and radar squadrons at 10 planned Army Missile Master AADCPs (the remaining 5 Missile Master bunkers of the Joint Use Site System (JUSS) were delayed until the Missile Master Plan resolved the BOMARC/NIKE surface-to-air missile dispute.)

== Stations ==
Two NCCs were completed in Alaska ("Fire Island on 1 March 1959 and Murphy Dome on 10 May 1959"), and by the end of 1959 NCCs "with limited identification and control facilities [were at:]

Loring AFB, Fairchild AFB, [sic] Ellsworth AFB, Minneapolis, Malmstrom AFB, Glasgow AFB, Minot AFB, Mt. Home AFB, Davis-Monthan AFB, and Offutt AFB."

USAF/Army collocation in Texas, Kansas, and Illinois was underway in 1959.

Several USAF aircraft control and warning squadrons had begun moving to JUSS installations by May 15, 1960 during the SAGE Geographic Reorganization. For example, the 635th Radar Squadron was scheduled to begin operating the RP-1 site radars at the first completed Missile Master bunker at Fort Lawton Air Force Station (SE-90DC) on January 21, 1960. Mill Valley Air Force Station was the San Francisco Defense Area NORAD Control Center after the "40th Artillery Brigade Air Defense Command Post" was established in September 1961 with a Martin AN/GSG-5 Battery Integration and Radar Display Equipment (BIRDIE) fire distribution center. It maintained this mission until 1974. NCC tracking data was provided to the computer(s) at the "NORAD/ADC Combined Operations Center" which opened in 1963 at the Chidlaw Building in Colorado Springs, Colorado.

== Computerized centrals ==
External image
- Fort Fisher NCC, Security Post, & radome

Military installations with hardened NCCs included 9 JUSS stations with partially underground Missile Master nuclear bunkers housing Martin AN/FSG-1 Antiaircraft Defense Systems and over 20 bases with above ground SAGE Direction Centers built for 5 psi (34 kPa).overpressure and containing AN/FSQ-7 Combat Direction Centrals (the last completed "SAGE direction center became operational at Sioux City, Iowa, in December 1961)." Three SAGE DCs were collocated with SAGE Combat Centers that used AN/FSQ-8 Combat Control Centrals for managing the air battle. Solid-state Martin AN/GSG-5/6 BIRDIE systems were at Mill Valley AFS CA, Belleville AFS IL, and in Florida, Mississippi, Missouri, and Texas (2) by July 1, 1962. In 1968, 17 of the NORAD Control Centers received the new Bell 305 Switching System to use AUTOVON telecommunications for Back-Up Interceptor Control.

AADCPs at NORAD Control Centers were phased out as Nike Defense Areas were closed. On December 23, 1980, the USAF declared full operational capability for the first seven Joint Surveillance System Regional Operations Control Center (ROCCs) with Hughes AN/FYQ-93 systems.
