= Ground Air Transmit Receive =

Ground Air Transmit Receive (GATR) control sites were the radio stations of a Burroughs 416L SAGE Defense System of the United States Air Force.

They were deployed to automate ground-controlled interception using crewed interceptor aircraft. Generally located near or, in some cases, on an Aerospace Defense Command radar station, a GATR site was used for the Ground to Air Data Link Subsystem to communicate command guidance via HF/VHF/UHF voice and TDDL to vector F-106 Delta Dart and other suitably equipped aircraft that had been dispatched by teams in Weapons Direction rooms of SAGE Direction Centers. Maintenance was done by the 304x4 Ground Radio Maintenance career field, with initial technical training at Keesler Air Force Base. The sites included the RCA AN/GKA-5 Time Division Data Link (TDDL) equipment, that fed a two-channel AN/FRT-49 Electronic Guidance Signals Transmitting Set, employing Varian klystrons to deliver 20 kilowatts output power (early sites used the 100 watt, single-channel AN/GRT-3 instead. The aircraft receivers were either Hughes AN/ARR-60 or SLI AN/ARR-61 Airborne Radio Receivers of the Hughes MA-1 Fire Control System.

Most GATR/SAGE sites are now Formerly Used Defense Sites (e.g., the 6-acre (2.4 ha) site supported by Oakdale Air Force Station, Pennsylvania) that were closed by the 1995 Base Realignment and Closure Commission.

== Sites ==
USAF Ground Air Transmit Receive sites
Sector DC	GATR # Coordinates	Support AFS, etc.	ST
Washington DC-04	R-16 34°45′33″N 076°51′20″W	Z-117 (Roanoke Rapids)	VA
Bangor DC-05	R-25	Z-15 (Topsham)	ME
Detroit DC-06	42°37′41″N 82°50′44″W	Z-20 (Selfridge AFB)	MI
Montgomery DC-09	R-tbd 30°14′47″N 88°04′56″W	Z-249 (Dauphin Island)	AL
Duluth DC-10	47°30′40″N 097°54′05″W	Z-29 (Finley)	ND
Seattle DC-12		Z-tbd (Makah)	WA
Sault Sainte Marie DC-14	46°27′00.26″N 84°24′11″W	Z-66 (Sault Sainte Marie)	MI
Los Angeles DC-17	R-22 34°33′07″N 120°30′08″W	Z-15 (Lompoc)	CA
Los Angeles DC-17	R-tbd 37°02′08″N 120°01′54″W	Z-74 (Madera)	CA
Los Angeles DC-17	R-tbd 35°07′31″N 117°36′23.4″W	Z-59 (Boron)	CA
San Francisco NCC-18	R-19 39°05′45″N 121°24′18″W	Z-38 (Mill Valley)	CA
San Francisco NCC-18	37°9′49″N 121°55′09″W	Z-96 (Almaden)	CA
Minot NCC-19	48°26′04″N 101°20′43″W	n/a (Minot AFB)	ND
Great Falls DC-20	R-27 48°53′05″N 103°53′03″W	Z-27 (Fortuna)	ND
Great Falls DC-20	46°56′07″N 102°43′54″W	Z-177 (Dickinson)	MT
Phoenix DC-21	32°26′31″N 112°56′56″W	Z-181 (Ajo)	AZ
Patrick DC-09	28°13′14″N 80°36′38″W	Z-211	FL
Z-tbd (Cut Bank)			MO
Sioux City DC-22		Z-133 (Hastings)	NE

The San Francisco Z-38 (Mill Valley) site differed from Manual Air Defense Control Centers that networked Permanent System radar stations, NORAD Control Centers had simpler C^{3} equipment (e.g., for the "austere SAGE area" in the Zone of the Interior) than the Direction Centers' AN/FSQ-7s such as the General Electric AN/GPA-37 Course Directing Group with AN/GPA-67 Time Division Data Link equipment through transmitters to the AN/ARR-39 "SAGE Datalink Receivers" used in the F-86L Sabre Interceptor, which was the SAGE variant—an F-86D Sabre Dog with equipment for day/night/all weather operations. For example, by 1965, "Hamilton AFB and Richards-Gebaur AFB…operated as Remote Combat Centers (Hamilton had remote input from Reno Sector and Richards-Gebaur from Sioux City Sector)".
