= FSQ =

FSQ may refer to

A number of computers ("Army Navy / Fixed Special eQuipment") manufactured by IBM:

- AN/FSQ-7
- AN/FSQ-8
- AN/FSQ-31V
- AN/FSQ-32

It may also refer to:

- Football Stewarding Qualification
- Fry Street Quartet
- Free Sale Quota, a term connected to coffee production in India
- Fast Simple QSO - digital mode used in Amateur Radio
