= Arlington Heights Army Air Defense Site =

Missile installation in Northern Virginia

- 1211 S New Wilke Road, Arlington Heights, Illinois

Site information
- Controlled by: Army Air Defense Command

Location
- Coordinates: 42°3′50.54″N 87°59′54.52″W

Site history
- Built: 1959
- In use: 1960-1968

The Arlington Heights Army Air Defense Site was a Project Nike Missile Master site near Chicago, Illinois. It operated from 1960 until 1968.

Installation started in late 1959 after the United States Army had purchased 44 acres (18 ha). (Note: Before the 1960 Operation Skyshield and the Arlington Heights opening of a Missile Master, simulated Strategic Air Command bomber raids against the Chicago missile batteries indicated the Nike-Hercules was only 8% effective.) Adjacent to the Arlington Heights Air Force Station, the Arlington Heights Army Installation opened on October 28, 1960, as the 8th of 10 Army Air Defense Command Posts (AADCP) to have a Martin AN/FSG-1 Antiaircraft Defense System installed for Nike-Hercules command and control. In addition to the Army's 2 AN/FPS-6 radars, the radars of the co-located USAF station provided AADCP data for the 45th Artillery Brigade's control of the Chicago-Gary Defense Area (10 missile batteries and their Integrated Fire Control sites). The vacuum tube AN/FSG-1 was replaced c. October 1967 (Note: The 1968 McMaster map shows the Arlington AN/FSG-1 on July 1, and the last AN/FSG-1 was replaced on February 8, 1967, at the AADCP at Oakdale, Pennsylvania.) with a solid-state Hughes AN/TSQ-51 Air Defense Command and Coordination System, which controlled the combined Chicago-Milwaukee Defense Area after the Milwaukee Defense Area merged with Chicago-Gary in 1968.

Project Concise ended the site's Nike operations in 1974, and 52 acres (21 ha) were transferred to the city parks district. A May 1979 golf course was built near the nuclear bunker—the Arlington Lakes Golf Club has 90 acres (36 ha) with 14 lakes.

== Site locations ==
- Nuclear bunker
- Co-located IFC site 42°3′11″N 87°59′40″W
- Co-located launch site 42°3′49″N 87°59′52″W

External images
- Radomes.org images
- nuclear bunker
- Google overhead image of bunker
