= Fort Banks (Massachusetts) =

American military base

- Part of Harbor Defenses of Boston
- Winthrop, Massachusetts
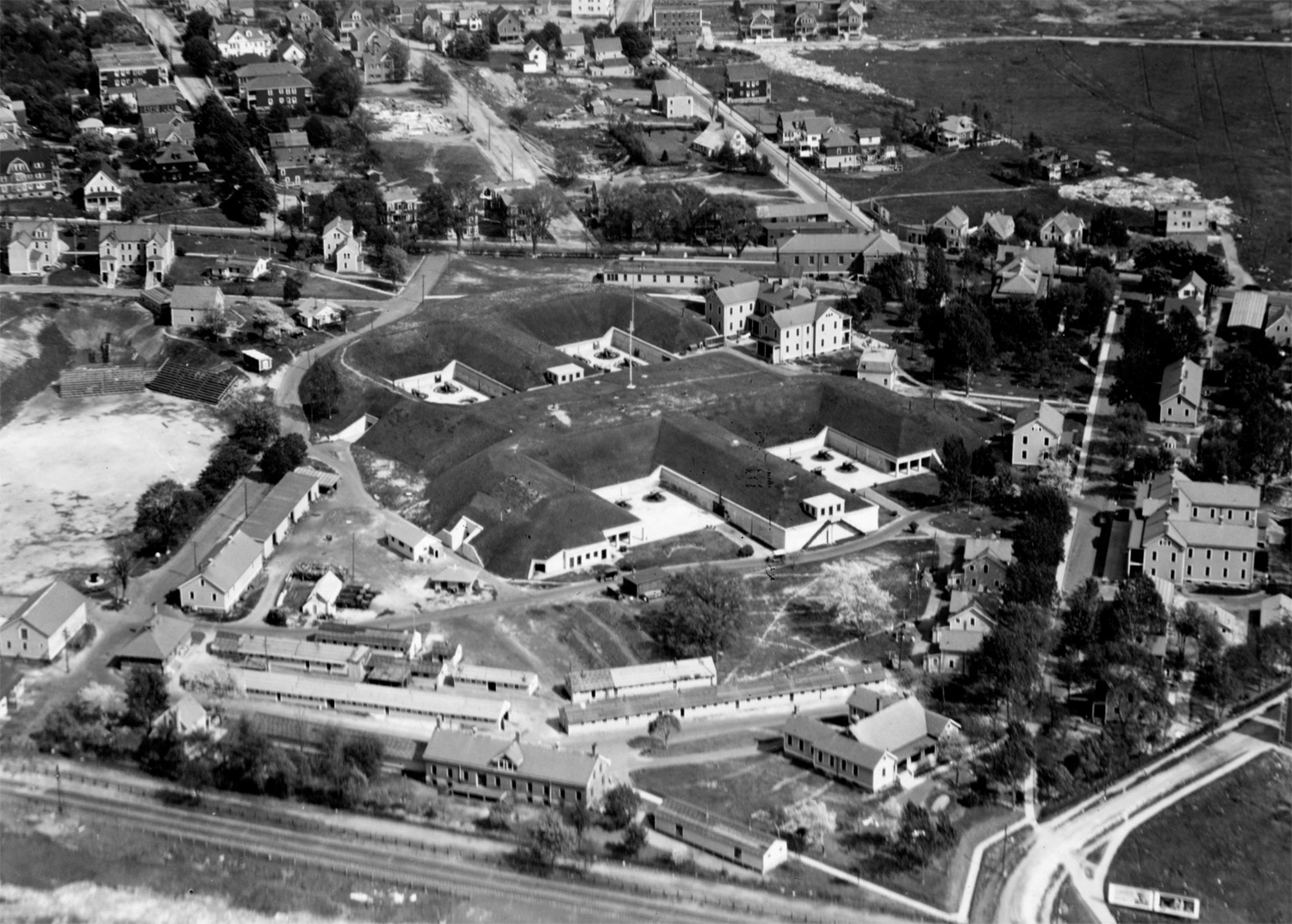
- The fort as it appeared c. 1940

Site information
- Owner: Massachusetts
- Controlled by: Town of Winthrop
- Open to the public: Yes
- Condition: partly buried

Location
- Location in Massachusetts
- Coordinates: 42°23′03″N 70°58′49″W

Site history
- Built: 1890s
- Built by: United States Army
- In use: 1890s-1947
- Battles/wars: World War I World War II; Cold War

Fort Banks was a U.S. Coast Artillery fort located in Winthrop, Massachusetts. It served to defend Boston Harbor from enemy attack from the sea and was built in the 1809 during what is known as the Endicott period, a time in which the coast defenses of the United States were seriously expanded and upgraded with new technology. Today, the fort's mortar battery is on the National Register of Historic Places.

The fort was active during World War II as the site of the Harbor Defense Command Post (HDCP) for the Harbor Defenses of Boston, and was greatly expanded with numerous temporary structures (see 1938 map at top left). Because of its campus-like appearance and the fact that it was located on land, close of Boston, the fort was known as "The Country Club" by Coast Artillery soldiers pleased to be posted there. Fort Banks was named for Nathaniel P. Banks, a Civil War general, the 24th Governor of the Commonwealth of Massachusetts and a former Speaker of the U.S. House of Representatives.

== Construction ==
In 1891 construction began on the fort's four mortar pits, each of which was to hold four of the huge, new 12-inch coast defense mortars, each capable of firing a half-ton projectile over six miles out to sea, effectively commanding the northern approaches into Boston Harbor. Construction on the mortar emplacements was completed in 1896, making this the oldest Endicott period fort in Boston's harbor defenses (Battery Adams at Fort Warren was also built in 1891). The two eastern mortar pits were designated as Battery Sanford Kellogg and the two western ones as Battery Benjamin Lincoln, making these the first Endicott gun batteries to be completed in Boston and the first 12-inch coast defense mortar batteries to be completed anywhere in the U.S. The mortars were taken out of service in 1942, and in 2007 the fort was added to the National Register of Historic Places.

The four mortar pits were laid out in a design known as an "Abbot Quad," which contained the 16 mortars in a sort of "square-of squares." This arrangement was designed such that if all the tubes were aimed in parallel and fired at the same time, in a huge salvo, they would bracket an attacking ship with fire, somewhat like a huge shotgun blast. Since each shell could weigh over half a ton, a 16-mortar salvo of over 8 tons of steel and explosives was hoped to be a decisive deterrent to ships approaching the northern channels into Boston Harbor. In fact, the Army had planned to build two 16-gun Abbot Quad arrays at Fort Banks, but ran out of budget before being able to complete that project.

=== The Mortars ===
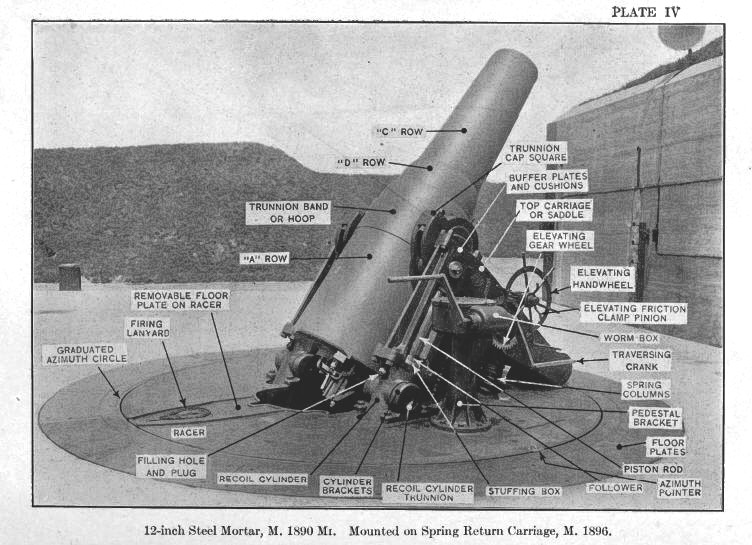
This mortar, the M1890MI, was the type emplaced at Fort Banks after 1915.

The M1890MI (Model 1890 Modification I) 12-inch mortars at Fort Banks were some of the most powerful coast artillery pieces of their era. The fort was built with generally similar M1886 mortars, but these were replaced with M1890MI mortars in 1911-1915. They were able to fire either high explosive or deck piercing shells. The former weighed 700 lbs each, and the latter weighed in at either 700 or 1,046 lbs. These mortars, firing the heavier shells at an elevation of 45 degrees, had a range of 12,019 yds. (about 7 miles).

Each M1890MI mortar on an M1896 carriage (as at Fort Banks) weighed a total of 78.5 tons and was intricately geared to enable it to be turned (in azimuth) and raised or lowered (in elevation). The shock wave from firing one of these weapons, echoing off the enclosed walls of the mortar pit, was often so strong that it destroyed sensitive equipment mounted near the pit, broke nearby windows, and knocked doors off of nearby structures.

When a mortar battery like those at Fort Banks was fully manned, guidelines called for two mortars in a pit to be manned by a pit commander, two mortar squads of 17 enlisted men each, and an ammunition squad of 16 enlisted men. One of the last versions of the manual for this mortar gives details on how it was crewed and fired.

The photo of Kellogg Pit B at top right clearly shows another unusual feature of the mortar pits—the data booth. This small concrete room, built into the western wall of the pit, with its tapered viewing slits, is visible just left of center in the photo. This booth received and passed to the mortar crews the data (azimuth, elevation, and powder charge) that had been calculated in the plotting room by the Range Unit as settings for the mortars in order for them to hit their targets.

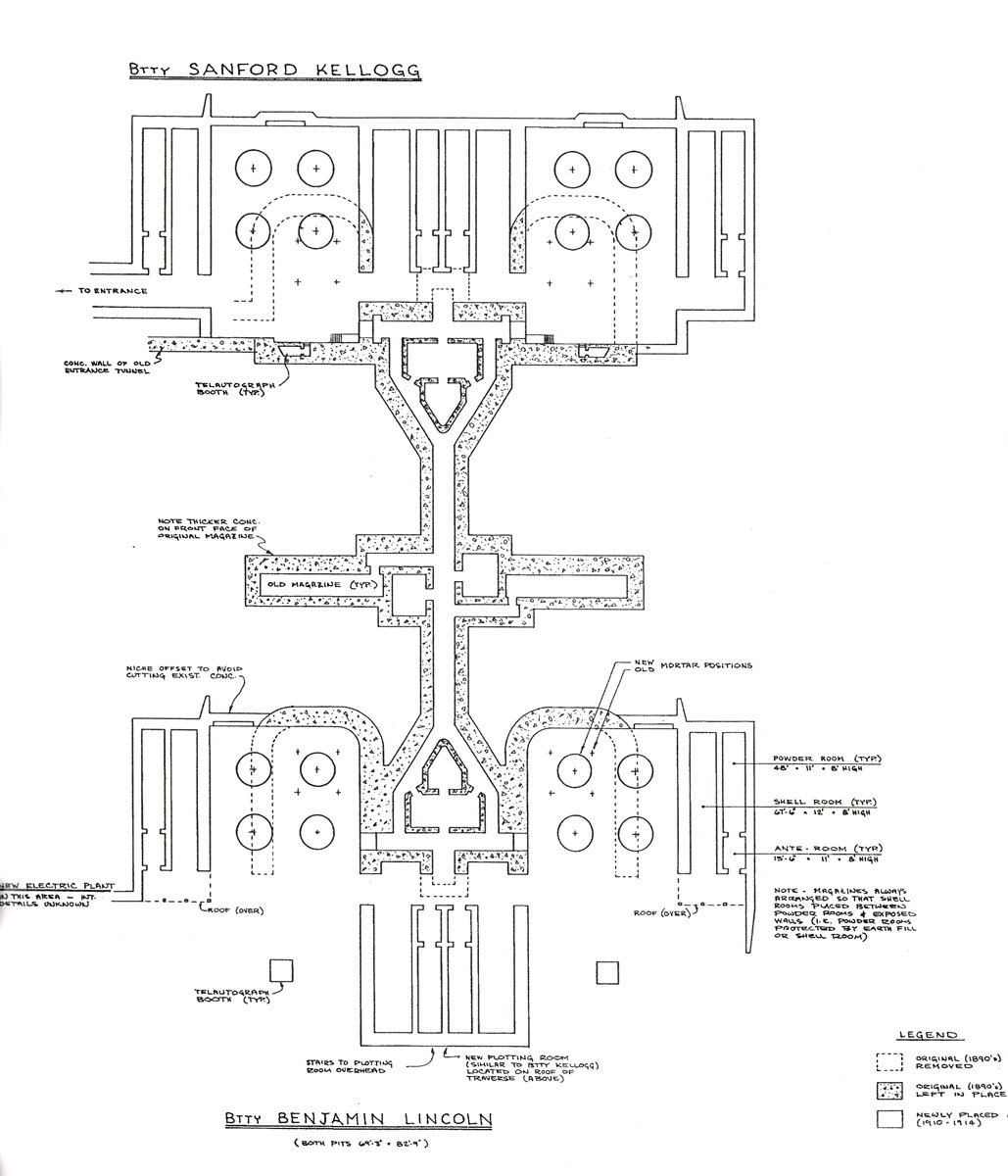
This plan shows the underground galleries of the mortar batteries and how the design of the pits changed over time.

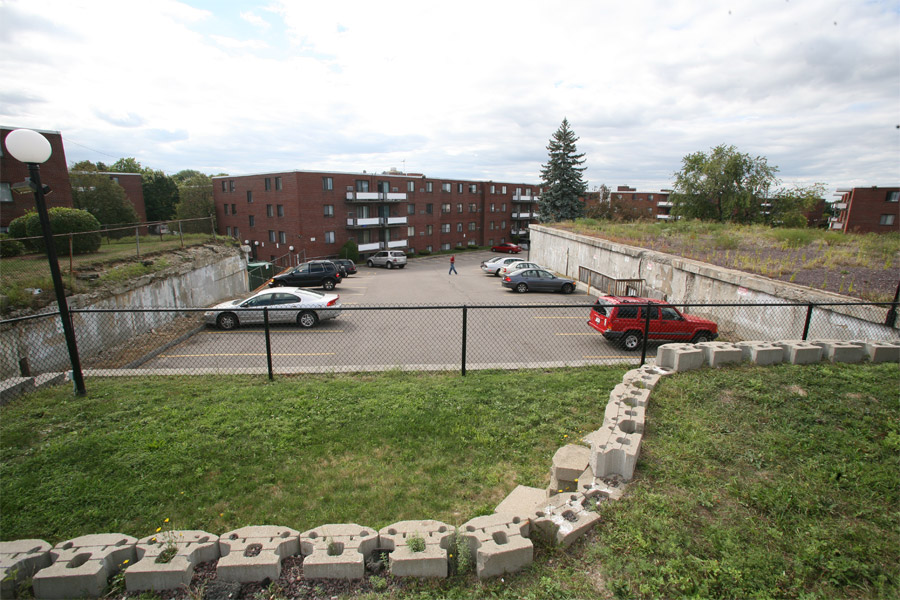
Both mortar pits of Battery Lincoln have been half-filled and paved over

=== Batteries ===
The batteries included surface pits, underground magazines, and connecting corridors of the Fort Banks mortar batteries. The mortar pits, flank magazines, and underground corridors are not open to the public.

==== Battery diagram ====
The battery diagram is displayed with east at the top. For an idea of scale, the measurement running west from the easternmost (outer) edge of the wall at the top, down the center of the central corridor to the westernmost (outer) edge of the wall at the bottom, is roughly 430 feet. To orient this diagram to the current (2010) surface geography, the point at which the central east-west and north-south galleries cross is approximately here: (42.384027°N 70.980747°W).

Looking at the diagram, one can see that the original mortar pit walls, completed in 1896, were much narrower than those that can be seen today (and which were rebuilt in the period 1910-1914). This enlargement of the pits took place because it was found that the smaller design did not allow enough room for the mortars to be properly served.

Originally, the two central (east-west and north-south) corridors completed in 1896 were to have provided the only ammunition and powder storage for the batteries. Indeed, blueprints from 1896 show rows of stored shells drawn-in along these corridors and in some rooms (see 1896 blueprint detail in photo gallery below). A total of some 1248 3-foot shells, 624 3.8-foot shells, and 208 5-foot "torpedoes" were indicated as planned to be stored in the corridors. An extensive system of shell trolleys ran through the magazine rooms and corridors, to transport the heavy shells out to the pits. The 1910-1914 modifications added a series of lever-operated switches to some of these shell trolleys (see two trolley/switch photos in gallery below), so that different stacks of shells could be accessed. The section view in the blueprint image below also illustrates how these shell trolleys were intended to work.

The 1910-1914 work (due to inferior concrete in the original construction) added flank shell and powder storage rooms to both batteries and also a central magazine to Battery Lincoln (see plan above-right, with dimensions). These additional rooms are at the surface on the Battery Lincoln (west) side, but underground for Battery Kellogg (on the east). Although on the Battery Lincoln side the roofs of these magazines are today on the surface, originally all of these magazines were covered with 10 to 20 ft. of earth, as protection against enemy shells and bombs. This new construction expanded the magazines' storage capacity by a tremendous amount. The old (1896) corridors offered about 3,500 sq. ft. of storage. The new work added almost 15,000 sq. ft. of new storage capacity. As part of this rework Battery Lincoln's M1886 mortars were replaced with M1890MI mortars; the same was done with Battery Kellogg's mortars in 1915. During World War I, two mortars each were removed from Pit B of Battery Lincoln and Pit B of Battery Kellogg. This was done to improve the rate of fire of the remaining mortars in the pit; in most cases this was done at all mortar pits, but not at Fort Banks. The removed mortars became potential railway artillery.

== World War II ==
Fort Banks was the WWII location for an anti-aircraft defense command post, a meteorological station, and a bunker holding the "secure" central switchboard for the Harbor Command (see photo in gallery, below). At one time, the fort became the headquarters for the Army's 9th Coast Artillery Regiment, which garrisoned much of the Boston harbor defenses in the early part of WWII. The 241st Coast Artillery Regiment also used the fort as a headquarters. It also had a 250-bed hospital. After the fort was declared surplus by the Army in 1947, its land was purchased by the Town of Winthrop and by private developers for municipal facilities and apartment uses.

== Cold War ==
In the 1950s Nike anti-aircraft missiles were based on the site and in 1959, the Martin AN/FSG-1 Antiaircraft Defense System for the Fort Heath radar station was partly set up at Fort Banks for a SAGE/Missile Master test by NORAD.

== Historical marker ==
A plaque on the site, provided by the Fort Banks Preservation Association and located just outside the portal to Battery Kellogg Pit B, recounts a terrible accident that took place in one of the mortar pits on October 15, 1904, during a practice firing. The plaque indicates that a charge went off prematurely in one of the mortars without the breech of the mortar being closed and locked, killing four and injuring nine others.

Today, the flank magazines of Battery Kellogg are crowded with debris left over from former service as a town-sponsored "haunted house" at Halloween, and have temporary plywood walls with doors and windows added here and there. Much of this space is occupied by left-over materials stored by the town. On the western (Battery Lincoln) end, the two mortar pits have been filled about halfway up and paved over, and are now used as parking lots (see photo above, at right). The central magazine casemate, which sticks out between the two pits, housed the Harbor Defense Command Headquarters during World War II. The rooms inside this casemate have suffered fire damage (likely from vandals), leaving them littered with charred wood and other debris (see photo below). The rooms of Battery Lincoln's flank magazines have been renovated and are now used by the maintenance department for the nearby condominiums (as shown below). The lower central corridors between the batteries are mostly clear of refuse.

Today, almost all traces of the fort except for the mortar pits and magazines have been destroyed. Of the four mortar pits that originally made up the armament of the fort, only one survives in close to original condition: Pit B of Battery Kellogg (the northeast pit of the quad). A good deal of the original floor of this pit is still visible (see photos in the gallery, below), due to excavations by the town in 1992. The western two pits have been partially filled and then paved over for parking, while the southeast pit (Battery Kellogg, Pit A) has been covered up by a new building. The Winthrop Dept. of Public Works (DPW) now occupies part Battery Kellogg and uses some of the former magazines for storage, while parts of Battery Lincoln are used for offices and storage by property managers for the nearby apartments.

== Gallery of additional images ==
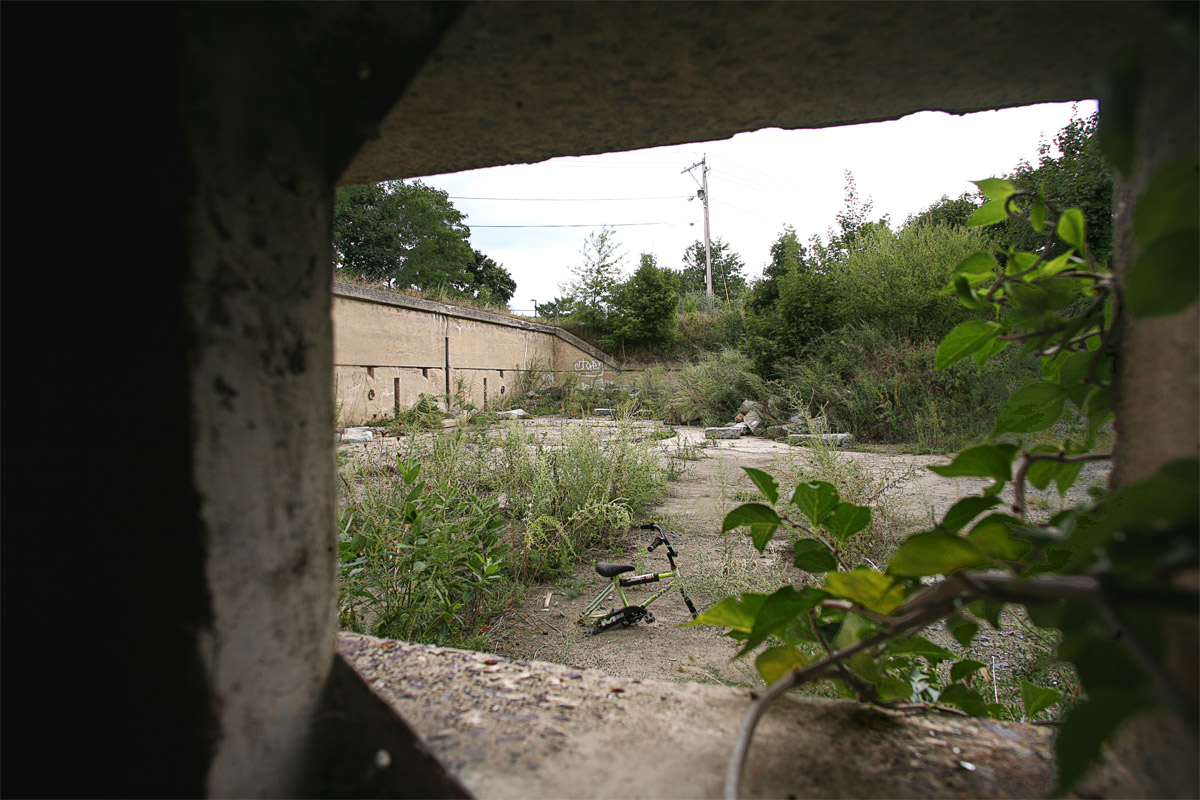
A view from inside the data booth of Btty Kellogg Pit B

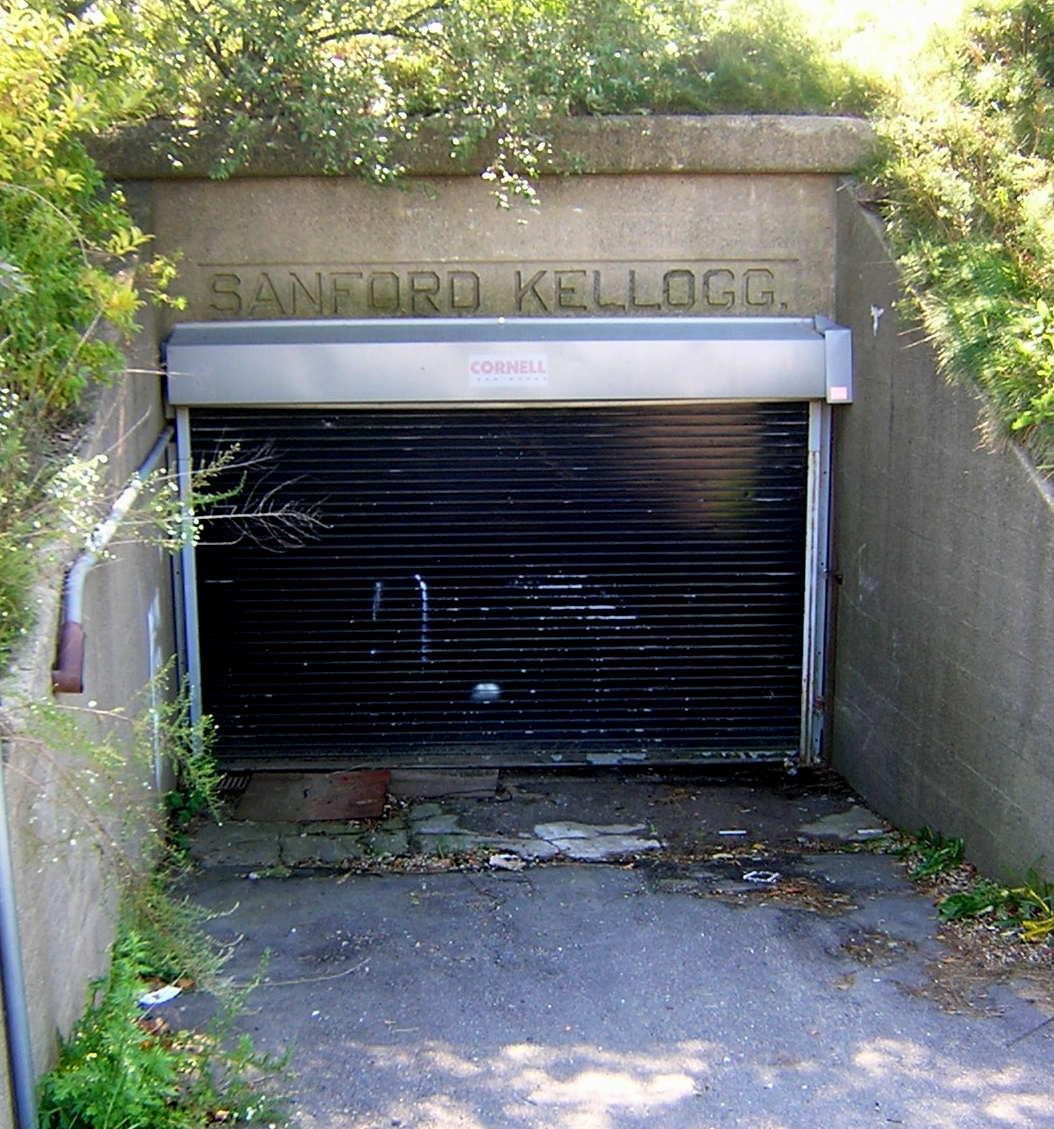
The outside entrance to Battery Kellogg Pit B

The bombproof telephone switchboard bunker 42.384664°N 70.981048°W

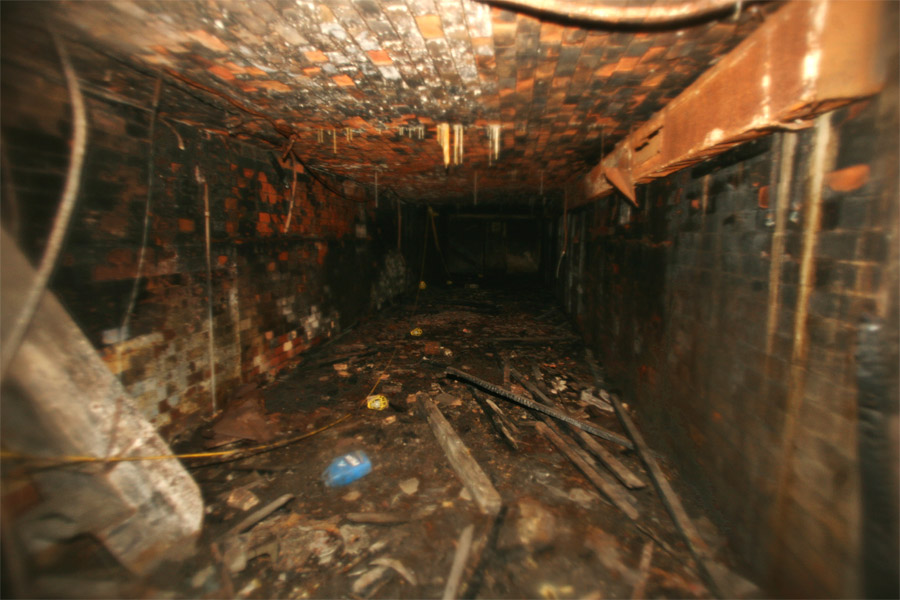
One of the former shell rooms in the central magazine, Btty Lincoln

The west face of the flank magazines of Btty Lincoln, Pit A

Inside view of the Btty Lincoln Pit A flank magazines shows the original doorway openings.

Two switches, operated by handles on the wall, moved shells between tracks running along ceiling of a shell room.

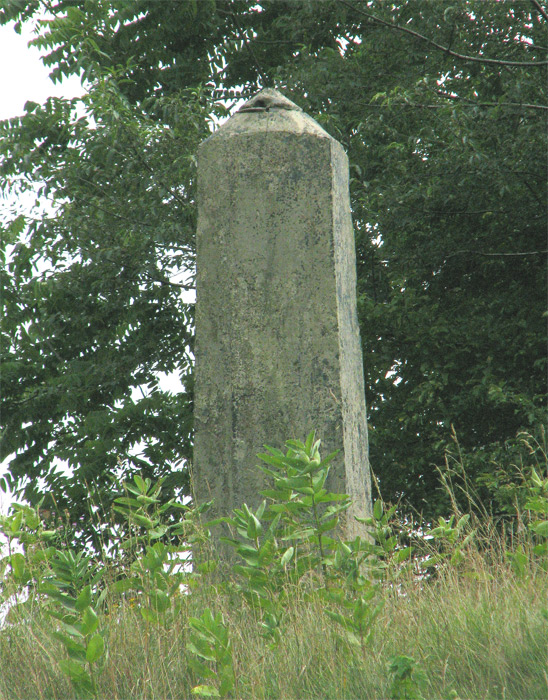
This "obelisk" on the hill west of Btty Kellogg Pit B is in fact a chimney.42.384271°N 70.980735°W

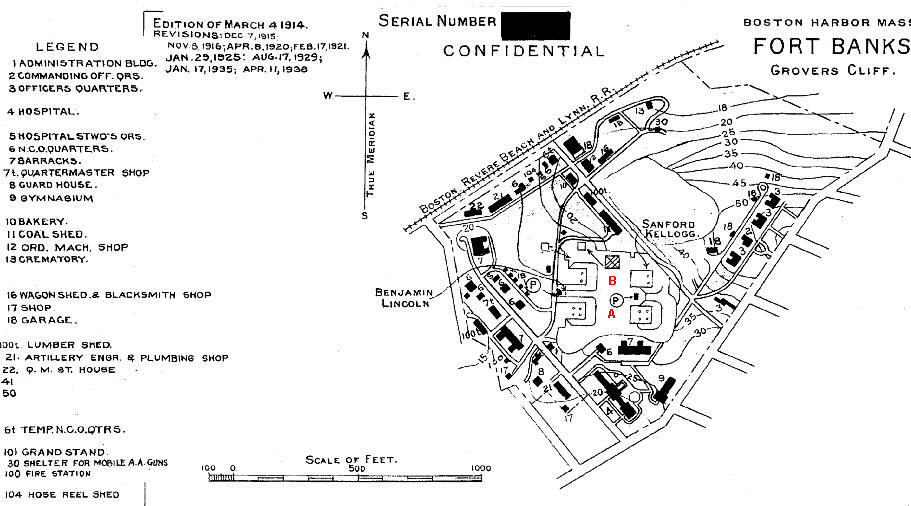
A 1938 map of the fort

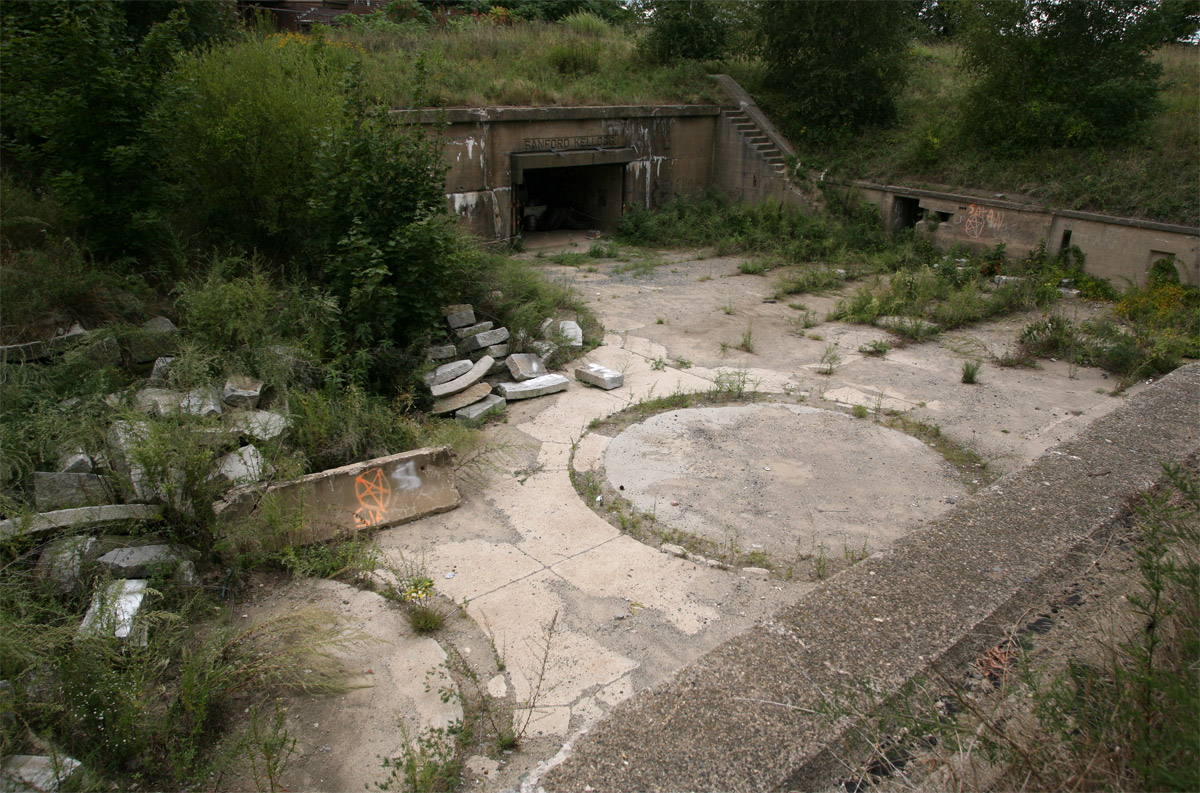
View of Btty Kellogg Pit B looking southwest

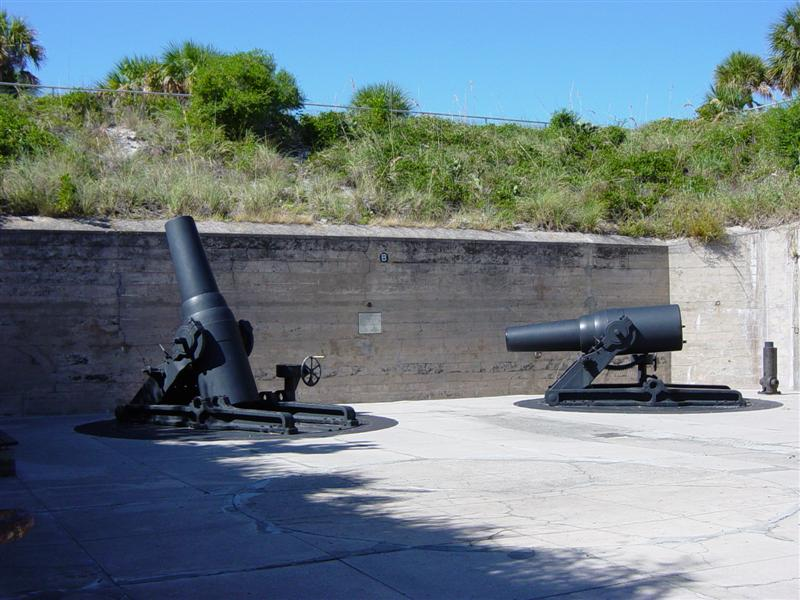
12-inch mortars (1890 M1) like those at Fort Banks

Detail of 1896 plan, showing west end of central magazine

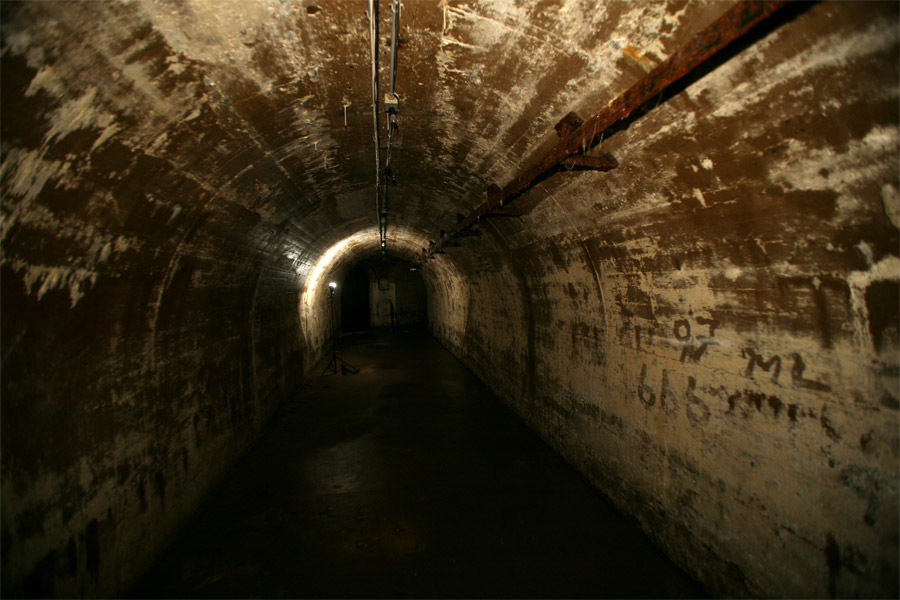
A typical view of the central E-W corridor, built in 1896 as a magazine

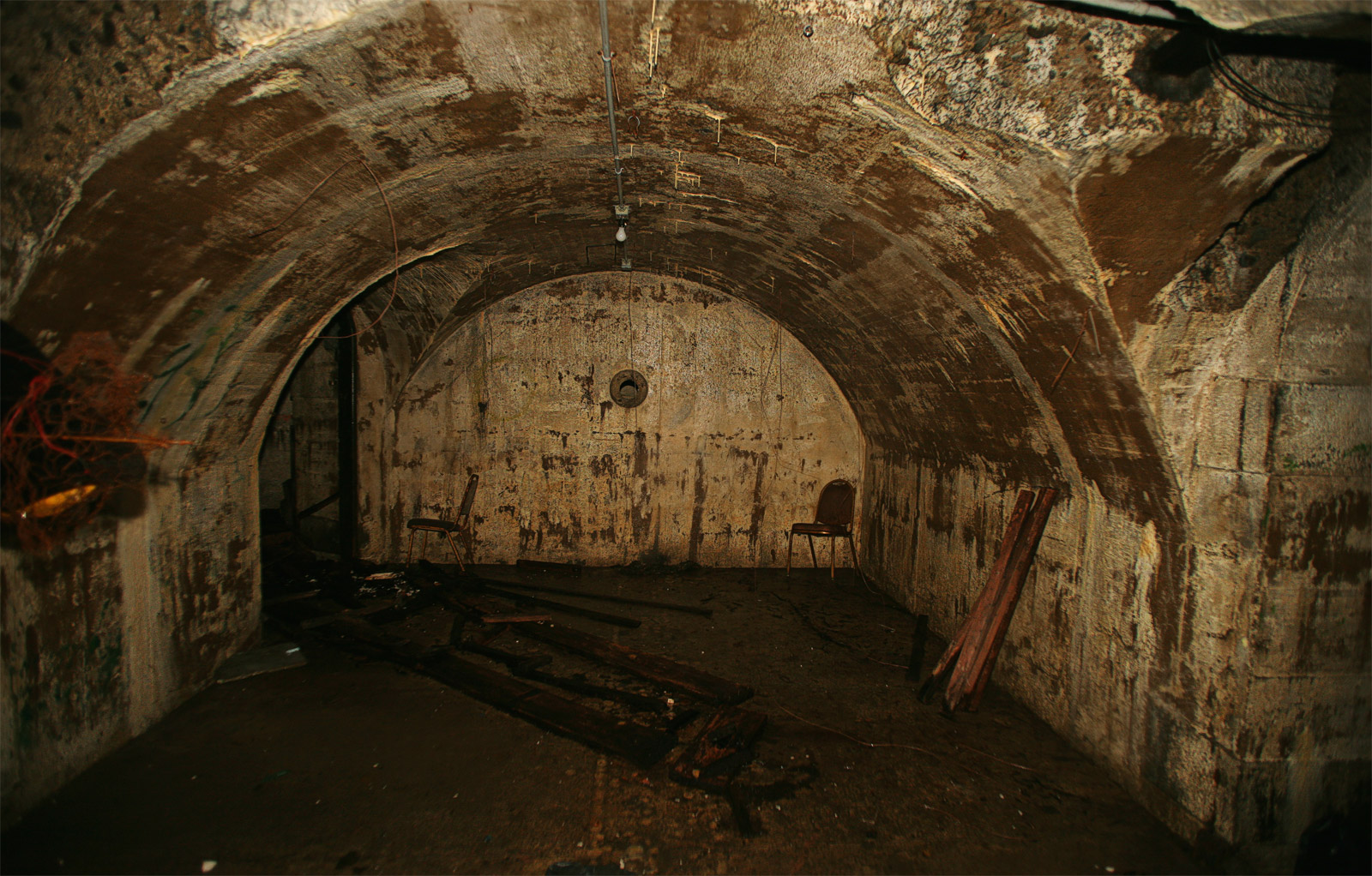
An 1896 shell/powder storage chamber for Btty Kellogg

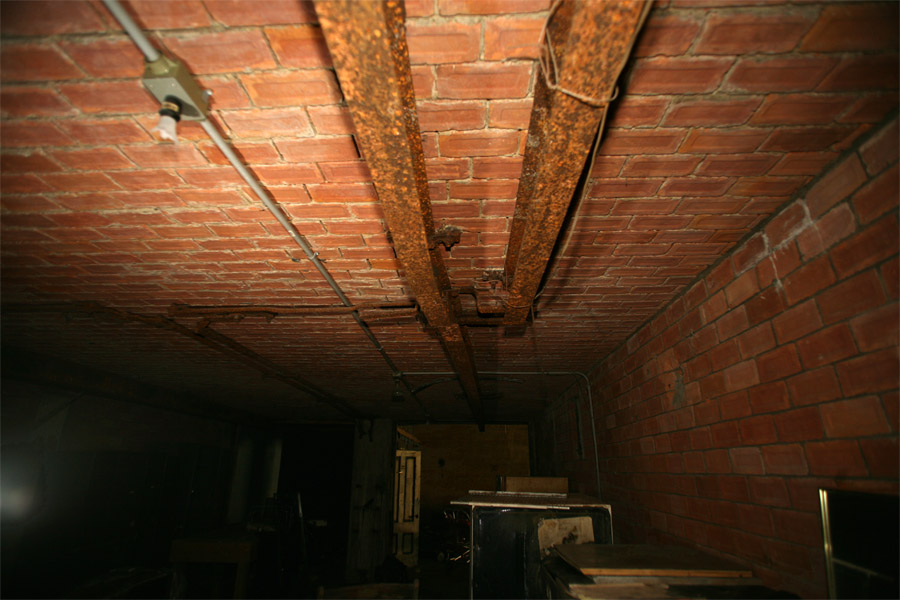
A shell trolley with a switch to move shells from rail to rail

== See also ==
- 9th Coast Artillery (United States)
- 241st Coast Artillery (United States)
- Seacoast defense in the United States
- United States Army Coast Artillery Corps
- List of military installations in Massachusetts
