= Back-Up Interceptor Control =

Computer backup system

Backup Interceptor Control (BUIC, /ˈbjuːɪk/) was the Electronic Systems Division 416M System to backup the SAGE 416L System in the United States and Canada. BUIC deployed Cold War command, control, and coordination systems to SAGE radar stations to create dispersed NORAD Control Centers.

Back-Up Interceptor Control sites
Station	Location	BUIC I	BUIC II	BUIC III
Baudette AFS	Minnesota			1968
Belleville AFS	Illinois			
Blaine AFS	Washington			
Boron AFS	California			
Calumet Air Force Station	Michigan			yes
Cape Charles Air Force Station	Virginia		??	
Charleston Air Force Station	Maine	3/1963	3/1966	12/1969
Fallon Air Force Station	Nevada			yes
Finland AFS	Minnesota		yes	
Fortuna AFS	North Dakota			
Fort Fisher AFS	North Carolina			yes
Fort Meade radar station	Maryland	yes		
Fortuna Air Force Station	North Dakota	yes		yes
Havre AFS	Montana			yes
Hutchinson AFS	Kansas			
Keno AFS	Oregon			yes
Kirksville AFS	Missouri			
Makah AFS	Washington	until 3/1966		
Manassas AFS	Virginia			
Montauk AFS	New York		yes	
Mount Laguna AFS	California			yes
North Bend AFS	Oregon	12/1962	yes	
North Truro AFS	Massachusetts	1963	9/1965	yes
Olathe AFS	Kansas			
Osceola AFS	Wisconsin			
Othello AFS	Washington	Yes		Yes
Palermo AFS	New Jersey		10/1965	
Port Austin AFS	Michigan		1965	1968
Rockville AFS	Indiana			
Saint Albans AFS	Vermont			
Saratoga Springs AFS	New York	until 1965		
Tyndall Air Force Base	Florida		yes	yes
Watertown AFS	New York			
Waverly AFS	Iowa			
RCAF Station St. Margarets	New Brunswick	yes	yes	yes
CFS Senneterre	Quebec			yes

== Background ==
Prior to the SAGE Direction Centers becoming operational, the USAF deployed data link systems at NORAD Control Centers with ground computers for controlling crewed interceptors. After SAGE IBM AN/FSQ-7 Combat Direction Centrals became operational and the Super Combat Centers with improved (digital) computers were cancelled, a backup to SAGE was planned in the event the above-ground SAGE Air Defense Direction Center failed.

== General Electric AN/GPA-37 Course Directing Group ==
BUIC began with deployment of General Electric AN/GPA-37 Course Directing Groups to several Long Range Radar stations. Units designated included the "U.S. Air Force 858th Air Defense Group (BUIC) [which became] a permanent operating facility" at Naval Air Station Fallon in Nevada.

== BUIC II ==
BUIC II was used to command and control sites using the Burroughs AN/GSA-51 Radar Course Directing Group. North Truro AFS became the first ADC installation configured for BUIC II.

== BUIC III ==
The AN/GYK-19 (initially AN/GSA-51A) was an upgraded version of the BUIC II system designated AN/GSA-51A and required a larger building than the AN/GSA-51. The first BUIC III site was Fort Fisher AFS, and Air Defense Command's was first installed at Fort Fisher Air Force Station, North Carolina.

Although more advanced systems were contemplated, the final design of the BUIC III system was an upgraded version of the BUIC II with around twice the performance.

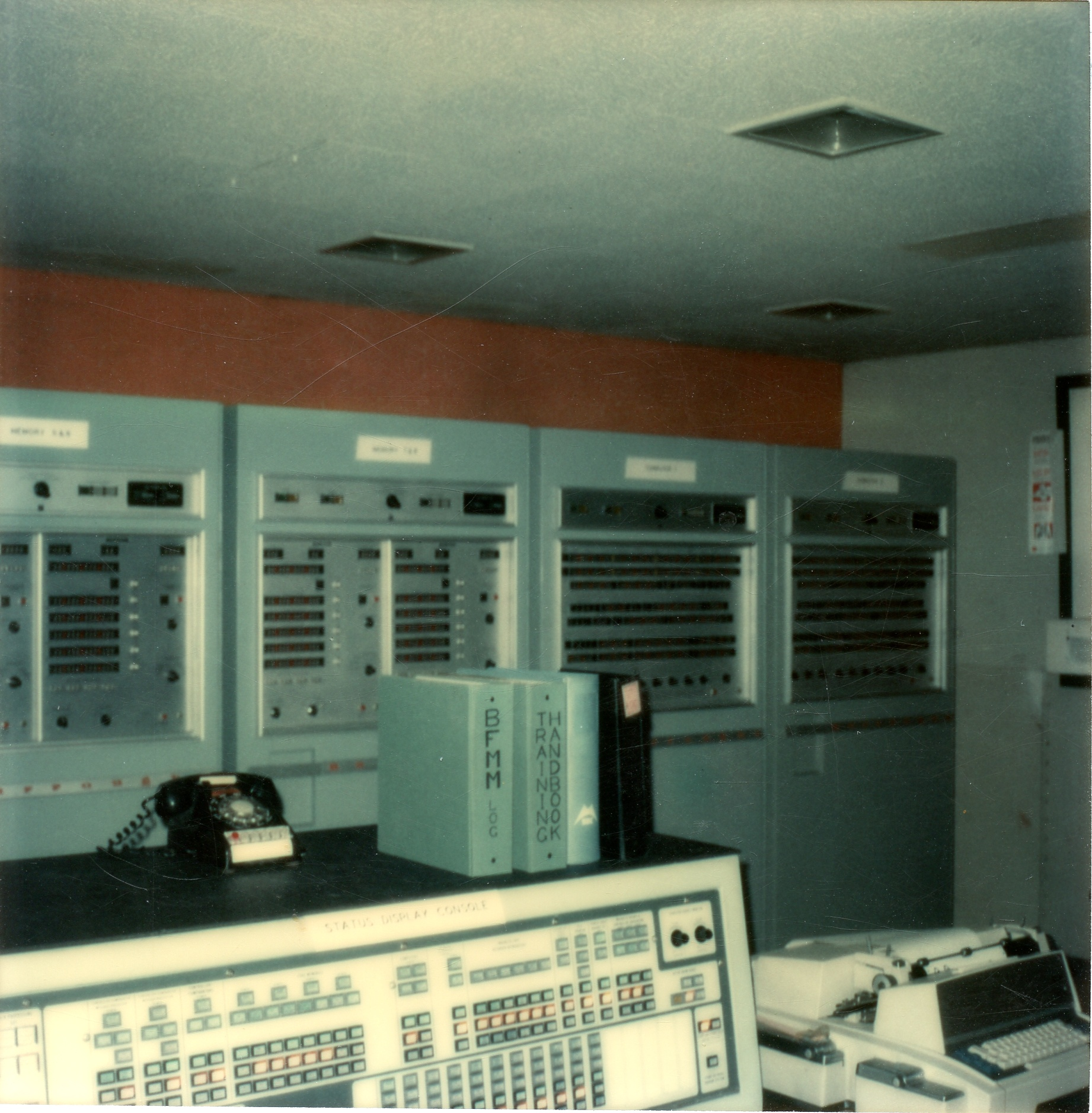
BUIC III at North Turro AFS shortly before shutdown December 1973. Background l->r Cabinets Memory 5&6, Memory 7&8, Computer 1, Computer 2. Foreground: Status Display Console, Teletype. Cabinets are about 3' wide, 3' deep, & 7' high

== Closure and upgrade ==
In 1972, the USAF decided to shut down most of the BUIC sites; most of the sites mothballed by 1974, except for the BUIC III site at Tyndall Air Force Base. In Canada the BUIC site at Senneterre was shut down, but St Margarets remained open. The remaining sites were closed between 1983-1984 when SAGE was replaced by the Joint Surveillance System.

The AN/FYQ-47 Common Digitizer for the Joint Surveillance System, and the Radar Video Data Processor (RVDP) was a combined system for the Air Force and Federal Aviation Administration (FAA), it replaced the SAGE Burroughs AN/FST-2 Coordinate Data Transmitting Sets.
