= Air Defense Direction Center =

Cold War-era command posts of USAF Air Defense Command

- NORAD sector direction center (NSDC)
- United States

An Air Defense Direction Center (ADDC) was a type of United States command post for assessing Cold War radar tracks, assigning height requests to available height-finder radars, and for "Weapons Direction": coordinating command guidance of aircraft from more than 1 site for ground-controlled interception ("weapons assignment"). As with the World War II Aircraft Warning Service CONUS defense network, a "manual air defense system" was used through the 1950s (e.g., NORAD/ADC used a "Plexiglass [sic] plotting board" at the Ent command center.) Along with 182 radar stations at "the end of 1957, ADC operated … 17 control centers", and the Ground Observation Corps was TBD on TBD. With the formation of NORAD, several types of ADDCs were planned by Air Defense Command:

- Joint Direction Center, a USAF ADDC collocated with an Army Air Defense Command Post, AADCP (together designated a "NORAD Control Center").
  - Alaskan Joint Direction Center, at 2 sites: Fire Island and Murphy Dome Air Force Station for the Alaskan Air Command Semi-Automatic Defense System (ALSADS)
- Semi-Automatic Direction Center (SAGE Direction Center), an ADCC (e.g., the "Duluth Sector Direction Center") with a command, control, and coordination system that provided the Semi-Automatic Ground Environment (SAGE), e.g., AN/FSQ-7 or AN/GSA-51 (in 1958, NORAD "forecast full SAGE direction center capability" by January 1963.)
  - Combined Direction-Combat Center, a USAF ADDC collocated with a SAGE Combat Center (e.g., DC-03 & CC-01 at Hancock Field for the Syracuse Air Defense Sector)
  - SCC Direction Center (SCC/DC), a USAF ADDC to be collocated with a planned Super Combat Center in a nuclear bunker (no SCCs, SCC/DCs, or above-ground DCs with AN/FSQ-32 were ever completed)
- Manual Direction Center, an ADCC without a SAGE CCCS, successors to the Manual Air Defense Control Centers of the Permanent System (cf. ADCCs with a "pre-SAGE semiautomatic intercept system")
- NIKE direction center, Army Project Nike AADCPs for coordinating surface-to-air missile fire from multiple batteries, e.g., W-13DC (at the Fort Meade radar station) through LA-45DC (Fort MacArthur Direction Center), 9 of which were within Missile Master nuclear bunkers.

Most ADDCs were replaced by Regional Operations Control Centers of the Joint Surveillance System (FOC on December 23, 1980).
