= Arctic Tower =

External image
- remaining Walker AFS Arctic Tower & quonset

An Arctic Tower (Tower AB-343/FPS) is a 20 ft diameter cylindrical radar station structure of the AN/GPA-33 Radar Set Group for protecting a USAF radar's antenna and electronic cabinets. Designed for low temperatures and strong winds, the 25 ft high tower's top platform supported an antenna group and a 20 ft high CW-313/FPS radome (truncated sphere of 25 ft diameter, 450 lb) which was "capable of withstanding two inches of ice" and winds of 109 knots. The 25,000 lb Arctic Tower was designed for supporting Radar Set AN//TPS-10D (AN/FPS-4) or Radar Set AN/TPS-1D, and could support other systems up to a load of 100psf on the 20 foot diameter platform, the interior 2nd floor, or the ground floor. In addition to protecting a radar system, the tower housed other AN/GPA-33 equipment such as the Radome Interior Control Group (OA-709/GPA-33) which included

- a pressure chamber (with pressure relief door) to prevent "loss of radome pressure when entry or exit is made" (e.g., for maintenance),
- pressurization equipment, e.g., motorized blower and sensing circuit with an interlock to prevent antenna operation at low radome pressures when dimpling of the radome would interfere with antenna movement,
- Electric Desiccant Dehumidifier (HD-191/GPA-33), a double-bed dehumidifier for inlet air to remove up to 37,000 grams of water per hour at 24°C,
- de-icing lamp banks each with 21 infrared lamps of 375 watts,
- anemometer and Wind Speed Transmitter (T-151/FPS-tbdA) to allow pressurization to be increased when high winds were measured

For crewmembers to remotely monitor the status of the Radome Interior Control Group (wind speed, temperatures, etc.), the Radar Set Group also included an Indicator Panel (ID-312/FPS-3) positioned within the squadron's "operations shelter" and connected to the Arctic Tower by cabling (e.g., in overhead cable trays supported by posts). Radar measurements from the Arctic Tower (e.g., radar return video for AN/FPS-4) were similarly passed via cable to the squadron's shelter to operations equipment such as the Burroughs AN/FST-2 Coordinate Data Transmitting Set that created the Semi Automatic Ground Environment at the station (antenna movement was also controlled from the shelter.)
