= 820th Radar Squadron =

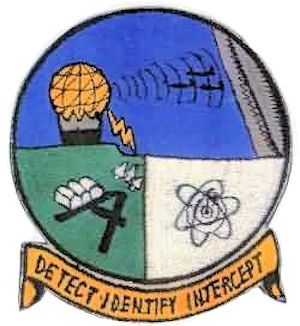
- Emblem of the 820th Radar Squadron
- Active: 1959-1962
- Country: United States
- Branch: United States Air Force
- Type: General Radar Surveillance

The 820th Radar Squadron is an inactive United States Air Force unit. It was last assigned to the Boston Air Defense Sector, stationed at the Fort Heath radar station, Massachusetts. It was inactivated on 1 December 1962.

The unit was a General Surveillance Radar Squadron providing for the air defense of the United States. It is unique in that it is the only unit originally activated as a Radar Squadron that was redesignated as an Aircraft Control & Warning Squadron An earlier 820th Aircraft Control and Warning Squadron had been programmed for activation at Robins AFB, GA, but that action was cancelled.

== Lineage ==
- Constituted as the 820th Radar Squadron (SAGE) on 28 August 1959

Activated on 18 October 1959
Redesignated 820th Aircraft Control and Warning Squadron on 1 December 1961
Discontinued and inactivated on 1 December 1962

Assignments

- Boston Air Defense Sector, 18 October 1959 – 1 December 1962

Stations

- Fort Heath, Massachusetts, 18 October 1959 – 1 December 1962

== See also ==
- Fort Heath
