= AN/FYQ-93 =

FYQ-93
- Also known as: AN/FYQ-93
- Manufacturer: Hughes Aircraft Company
- Released: 1983
- Discontinued: 2006
- Operating system: JSS JOVIAL
- Predecessor: Semi-Automatic Ground Environment (SAGE)

FYQ-93 was a computer system used from 1983 to 2006, and built for the Joint Surveillance System (JSS) by the Hughes Aircraft Company. The system consisted of a fault tolerant central computer complex using a two string concept that interfaced with many display consoles and interfaced with external radars to provide a region-sector display of air traffic.

This system was composed of a suite of computers and peripheral equipment configured to receive plot data from ground radar systems, perform track processing, and present track data to both weapons controllers forward and lateral communications links. The HMD-22 consoles displayed data from various radars including those compiled from the Region Operations Control Center/Airborne Warning And Control Systems (ROCC/AWACS) through the AN/GSQ-235 Digital Information Link (RADIL). The data was routed to the Cheyenne Mountain Complex from installations located in the continental United States (CONUS), Canada, Alaska and Hawaii.

The need for the FYQ-93 system became apparent in the 1970s when the Semi-Automatic Ground Environment (SAGE) system became technologically obsolete and logistically unsupportable. The FYQ-93 system was conceived and specified in the late 1970s. It was manufactured and delivered during the first half of the 1980s and by the end of 1984, all nine facilities were in place. Enough of the system was in place in mid 1983 for the SAGE system to officially shut down and the JSS became the air defense system of the United States and Canada. The large network of military long range radar sites was closed and a much smaller number (43) of FAA Joint Use sites replaced them.

The JSS was a joint USAF/FAA radar use program. The ACC portion of the JSS was composed of four CONUS SOCCs equipped with FYQ-93 computers, and 47 ground-based FPS-93 Search Radars. FAA equipment was a mix of Air Route Surveillance Radar (ARSR) 1, 2, and 3 systems. Collocated with most radar sites were UHF ground-air-ground (G/A/G) transmitter/receiver (GATR) facilities. Fourteen sites have VHF radios also. The GATR facility provided radio access to fighters and AWACS aircraft from the SOCCs.

The JSS radars sent surveillance data to the SOCCs who then forwarded tracks of interest to the CONUS ROCC and North American Air Defense Command (NORAD). Radar and track data were sent through landlines as TADIL-B data and through HF radio links as TADIL-A data. Both TADIL links were provided by the Radar Data Information Link (RADIL). CONUS SOCCs communicated with the CONUS ROCC and NORAD by voice and data landline circuits.

Internally, a single "string" of the FYQ-93 system included one Hughes H5118ME Central Computer and two Hughes HMP-1116 Peripheral computers. Radar data was input and buffered in one 1116 for orderly transfer to the 5118, which then constructed the "air picture". The second 1116 on the string handled program loading, console commands, and data storage. The output of the string fed another 1116 called a "Display Controller" (DC), which sent data to and received switch actions from the HMD-22 consoles. Typically, there were two strings and two DCs processing in parallel, one on standby in case of a malfunction in its counterpart. Either string could feed either DC for further equipment reliability.

The software was written in a proprietary version of the programming language JOVIAL termed JSS JOVIAL. The system was updated over time to change tape drives to disk cartridges and single-line printers to multi-line printers. The memory in the H5118ME was expanded at least twice to the system maximum of 512,000 18-bit words.

The H5118E was eventually upgraded to the H5118M computer which had 1 megabyte of memory and could handle 1.2 million instructions per second while the original model had a memory of 256 kilobytes and a clock speed of 150,000 instructions per second. Although the H5118M was part of the NATO Integrated Air Defense System it is unclear if JSS received the same upgrades.

Internal to Hughes, the next generation Air Defense and Air Traffic Control systems were being developed as JSS was being deployed. The next generation was based on using any computer of a certain processing class to replace the 5118 computer. Examples include DEC VAX and Norsk Data Systems. This was driven in part by the needs of different sovereign states who wanted their computers used for their in-country systems. This was also driven by the great miniaturization of computer hardware. The next generation Hughes systems used 2K X 2K resolution 20" X 20" color raster displays, touch entry, voice synthesis and recognition consoles, dual redundant fiber optic Token Ring buses to link all consoles and computers, extensive processing in the consoles including mission processing, and movement into software written in the programming language Ada.

The FYQ-93 was part of a long history of developing air defense Systems starting in the 1950s. The FYQ-93 was based on the Combat Grande System which was one of the first systems to extensively use science and engineering principals to develop software. This allowed for extensive re-use and optimization for the needs of each nation state installing and using the Hughes Systems.

== Classification of radar systems ==
Under the Joint Electronics Type Designation System (JETDS), all U.S. military electronic systems are assigned a unique identifying alphanumeric designation. The letters “AN” (for Army-Navy) are placed ahead of a three-letter code. In accordance with the JETDS, the "AN/FYQ-93" designation represents the 93rd design of an Army-Navy electronic device for fixed (meaning not transported) special data processing or computer system. The JETDS system also now is used to name all Department of Defense electronic systems.

== See also ==
- Joint Surveillance System
- NATO Integrated Air Defense System
