= AN/GSG-5 Battery Integration and Radar Display Equipment =

The Martin AN/GSG-5 Battery Integration and Radar DIsplay Equipment (BIRDIE) was a transportable electronic fire distribution center for automated command and control of remote surface-to-air missile launch batteries. The solid state radar netting system replaced the vacuum tube AN/FSG-1 at 3 United States Missile Master bunkers (Fort Lawton Air Force Station, Washington; Fort Heath, Massachusetts; and Lockport Air Force Station, New York) and BIRDIEs were deployed at over 25 US locations including Homestead-Miami, Florida; Providence, Rhode Island; and San Francisco. The AN/GSG-5 with 3 consoles was a direction center for up to 16 Nike missile batteries, but a smaller variant with only 1 console and without computer and storage equipment (single shelter AN/GSG-6) could control only 2 batteries and was the 1st BIRDIE deployed. Several BIRDIE systems were replaced by Hughes AN/TSQ-51 Air Defense Command and Coordination Systems (Missile Mentor), and the last AADCP with an AN/GSG-5 was at Ft Lawton on July 1, 1973 (the next-to-last was at Highlands Air Force Station, New Jersey).

In accordance with the Joint Electronics Type Designation System (JETDS), the "AN/GSG-5" designation represents the 5th design of an Army-Navy electronic device for ground special fire control system. The JETDS system also now is used to name all Department of Defense electronic systems.

== See also ==
- List of military electronics of the United States
