= Football Stewarding Qualification =

The Football Stewarding Qualification (or FSQ for short) is a qualification that all stewards at a designated football ground must gain while they are working. This is to ensure the safety of spectators who come to a football game and to avoid repeats of incidents like Hillsbourgh and the Bradford Fire .

== Current issues ==
Although the FSQ is still accepted as an acceptable qualification to steward at football grounds it has now been replaced by the NVQ Level 2 Spectator Control qualification which all new stewards starting training will work towards.
