= Fort Meade radar station =

Cold war era military site in Maryland, US

Army Air Defense Command Post (AADCP)
- Baltimore, Maryland, Fort George G. Meade, Anne Arundel, Maryland

Site information
- Type: Fort

Location
- Coordinates: 39.753393°N 75.450068°W

Site history
- Built: 1959-60*; September 1966

The Fort Meade radar station was an air defence radar installation used by the Army and USAF. The site operated c. 1950 until 1979 and had a Project Nike command post and radar network.

== Lashup site L-14 ==
Site L-14 of the temporary Lashup Radar Network was the ground-controlled interception radar station established at Fort George G. Meade until the radar's surveillance area was covered by a Quantico AFS radar in 1955. The Fort Meade radar station also had the first experimental AN/GSG-2 Antiaircraft Defense System in 1955.

== ARAACOM site W-13DC ==
In 1957 the Fort Meade station was designated an Army Air-Defense Command Post (AADCP) for the Washington-Baltimore Defense Area. The site had the first operational Martin AN/FSG-I Antiaircraft Defense System, a fire distribution center for Nike Missiles and which was operated by the 35th Antiaircraft Artillery Brigade. Designated W-13DC, the site had an AN/FPS-67 search radar and later a solid-state Hughes AN/TSQ-51 Air Defense Command and Coordination System. After 1957, Fort Meade became the Headquarters, 2nd Region, Army Air Defense Command.

== ADC site RP-54 ==
On 1 October 1961, W-13DC was integrated with the Aerospace Defense Command network as replacement site RP-54 operated by the USAF's 770th Airborne Control and Warning Squadron that transferred from former site P-54 at Palermo Air Force Station, New Jersey. Site RP-54 became part of the 1957 Washington Air Defense Sector) with an interface with the DC-04 SAGE system direction center at Fort Lee Air Force Station (inactivated 1 March 1983).

== NORAD site Z-227 ==
On 1 July 1963, the station was redesignated as site Z-227 (Palermo AFS re-opened as site Z-54), and the USAF unit was renamed the 770th Radar Squadron assuming control of the AN/FPS-67 and installing one each AN/FPS-6 and AN/FPS-6B height-finder radars by 1962. In 1964 an AN/FPS-90 replaced Meade's AN/FPS-6B, and the AN/FPS-6 was shut down; while in 1966 the AN/FPS-67 was upgraded to an AN/FPS-67B.

In addition to an annex at the former Manassas Air Force Station, the Fort Meade radar station had unmanned AN/FPS-14 Gap Filler annexes at Hermanville, Maryland (RP-54A/Z-227A, 38°13′40″N 076°24′33″W) and Hanover, Pennsylvania (RP-54B/Z-227B, 39°51′28″N 076°56′52″W). The Washington AADCPs at Suitland & Ft Meade were deactivated on 1 September 1974; and USAF air defense operations at Ft Meade ended 1 October 1979 (a plan to use the site in the 1983 Joint Surveillance System was not implemented).
