= AN/FST-2 Coordinate Data Transmitting Set =

External images
- "AN/FST-2 in SAGE System"
- AN/FST-2 data flow to AN/FSQ-7
- end view of racks
- OA-1204 & -367 consoles

The Burroughs AN/FST-2 Coordinate Data Transmitting Set (CDTS) was a Cold War military computer system at SAGE radar stations for displaying aircraft tracks and converting them for digital transmission to IBM AN/FSQ-7 Combat Direction Centrals at air defense data centers. Developed by the Great Valley Research Laboratory of the Burroughs Corporation as part of the Electronic Systems Division's 416L network of computers, 134 CDTSs were deployed. Each was to "process the raw radar data, antenna position information, and IFF data, and send it over voice grade toll phone lines" at ~1200 baud with 1/4 mile precision. The transmissions were received as "Long Range Radar Input" at SAGE Direction Centers, which performed the aircraft control and warning operations (e.g., launch and flight control for CIM-10 Bomarc SAMs) and provided command information to Command Centers which forwarded data to the NORAD command center in Colorado (Ent AFB, 1963 Chidlaw Building, and the 1966 Cheyenne Mountain Complex). The AN/FST-2A included 2 vacuum tube computers and accepted 14 input signals (32 inputs for transistorized AN/FST-2B sets).

In accordance with the Joint Electronics Type Designation System (JETDS), the "AN/FST-2" designation represents the second design of an Army-Navy electronic device for fixed special transmission system. The JETDS system also now is used to name all Department of Defense electronic systems.

== See also ==
- List of military electronics of the United States
