= AN/FSG-1 =

- Part of Army Air Defense Command Posts at Missile Master complexes
- 9 states: CA IL MA MD MI NJ(2) NY PA WA in United States

Site information
- Type: military command, control and coordination system
- Owner: United States Army
- Operator: Army Air Defense Command
- Controlled by: Contractee: Signal Engineering Laboratories; Contractor: Martin Company Orlando Division; Subcontractors: Airborne Instruments Laboratory, American Machine and Foundry
- Subsystems & AAOC consoles: tactical display subsystem with 3 tactical monitor consoles: friendly protector console; operations officer's console; commander's console; tracking subsystem with: 6 tracking consoles; 2 surveillance and entry cons.; 2 range-height indicator cons.; channel status unit; computing and storage equipment ADL transmitters and receivers

The Martin AN/FSG-1 Antiaircraft Defense System, better known as Missile Master, was an electronic fire distribution center for United States Army surface-to-air missiles. It aimed to computerize Cold War air defense (AD) command posts from manual plotting board operations to automated command and control.

The 10 C^{3} systems used radar netting ("electronic umbrella") at Missile Master military installations for coordinating ground-controlled interception by Nike and MIM-23 Hawk missiles. The vacuum tube fire control logic reduced the time to designate the appropriate missile battery to launch if an enemy target had intruded into a defense area where an AN/FSG-1 system was deployed.

In accordance with the Joint Electronics Type Designation System (JETDS), the "AN/FSG-1" designation represents the first design of an Army-Navy electronic device for fixed special fire control system. The JETDS system also now is used to name all Department of Defense electronic systems.

== History ==
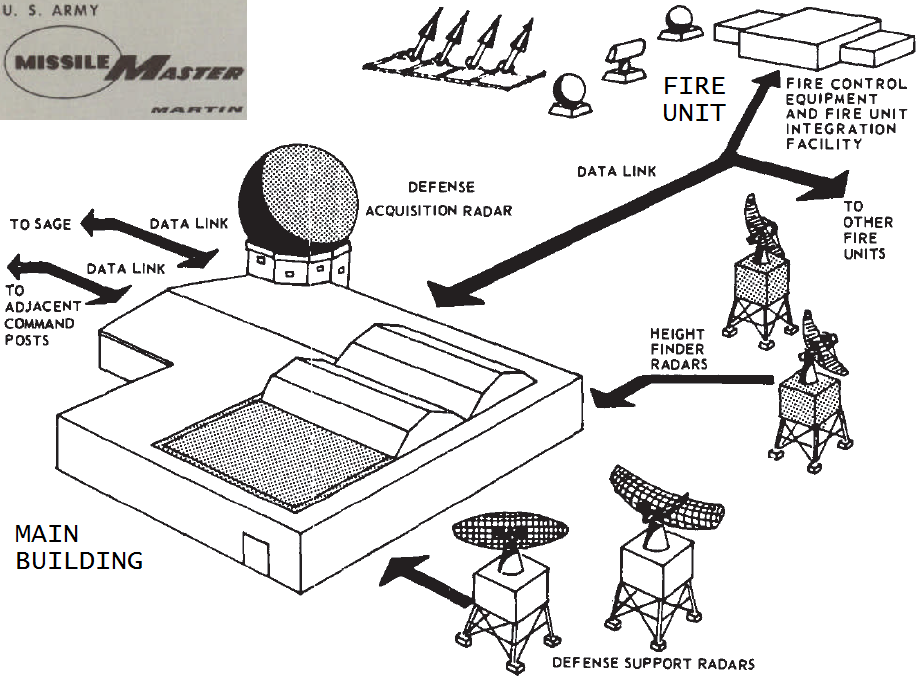
AN/FSG-1 systems in 9 U.S. nuclear bunkers (large building) networked local radars and "up to 24 Nike Hercules AD missile batteries".

The AN/FSG-1 was an outgrowth of the July 1945 Signal Corps' Project 414A for an electronic Air Defense Fire Distribution System (ADFDS), a 1950 prototype computer and console system, and the 1954 experimental forerunner/"test system" (AN/GSG-2) installed at Fort George G. Meade. The 1st AN/FSG-1 was contracted in August 1955, the program had been publicly announced by August 1956, Missile Master sites had been selected by June 1957, and the "operational" AN/FSG-1 at the Fort Meade radar station was "put into action" on December 5, 1957. A 13-minute AN/FSG-1 military film (MF 11-8923) was produced in 1958, and Congressional funding for additional sites was initiated in 1959 after the "Missile Master Plan" resolved the Army Project Nike and USAF CIM-10 Bomarc plans for SAM air defense.

During the October 1959-July 1960 study regarding the system's algorithm for Automatic Target and Battery Evaluation (ATABE), the "first production model AN/FSG-1" was dedicated in January 1960 at Fort Lawton Air Force Station (AFS), Washington. Following installation, a checkout period, and AN/FSG-1 acceptance; a dedication ceremony was often held and open to media (e.g., May 1960 acceptance at Highlands AADS, New Jersey, with June 5 dedication). The "SAGE/Missile Master test program" conducted large-scale field testing of the AN/FSG-1 "mathematical model" using actual radar tracks of SAC and ADC aircraft sorties into the defense areas (SAC-simulated bomb runs were planned after September 22, 1960). The last (10th) AN/FSG-1 was dedicated in December 1960 at Fort MacArthur, California.

AN/FSG-1 installations
ST	site (defense area)	AN/FSG-1 operations	razed	CP: Brig (batteries)
MD	Fort Meade (Washington-Baltimore)	December 5, 1957—August 1966	(no bunker)	W-13DC: 35th
WA	Fort Lawton AFS	January 21, 1960—c. January 1965*	2008	S-90DC
MA	Fort Heath (Boston)	c. April 1960 —early 1965.	1969	B-21DC (12)
NJ	Highlands AADS (New York)	May 1960—November 30, 1966	1995	NY-55DC: 52nd
MI	Selfridge AFB (Detroit)	June 1960—c. October 1967*	2005	D-15DC (16)
NY	Lockport AFS (Niagara Falls-Buffalo)	Jul or Aug 1960—c. July 1965*	bunker intact	NF-17DC
NJ	Pedricktown AADB (Philadelphia)	* —September 1966	bunker intact	PH-64DC: 24th
IL	Arlington Heights AFS (Chicago-Gary)	October 28, 1960—c. October 1967*	bunker intact	C-80DC: 45th
PA	Oakdale AFS (Pittsburgh)	November 18, 1960—February 8, 1967		P-70DC: 31st (6)
CA	Fort MacArthur DC (Los Angeles)	December 14, 1960 <---->—January 31, 1967	c. 1985	LA-45DC: 47th (16)

=== Replacement ===
With the availability of solid-state direction center (DC) equipment such as the Martin AN/GSG-6 BIRDIE deployed in 1961, the United States Department of Defense approved in December 1963 the replacement of the AN/FSG-1. Six were replaced with Hughes AN/TSQ-51 Air Defense Command and Coordination Systems with the last replacement on February 8, 1967, at Oakdale AFS, Pennsylvania. Ft Lawton, Fort Heath MA, and Lockport AFS NY were replaced with BIRDIEs while instead of replacement, the AN/FSG-1 at Pedricktown Army Air Defense Base was removed after its defense area was incorporated into the combined New York-Philadelphia Defense Area controlled by Highlands AADS—which later switched to a BIRDIE by July 1, 1972 (conversely, Ft Heath & Lockport subsequently switched from BIRDIE to AN/TSQ-51).

== Operations ==
The "semiautomatic" AN/FSG-1 automatically plotted target tracks, evaluated missile sites for use against a target, and automated the communication with batteries. The automation reduced delay "by four or five times" over the previous command post method with manual plotting, review of hardcopy performance charts to estimate an intercept point, and telephone voice commands. Operators at the AADCP reviewed the 19 in (48 cm) orange interactive plan position indicator CRTs which displayed the AN/FSG-1 radar network's data, e.g., "14 pieces of information...height, level, priority, direction...", etc. in the tiered Antiaircraft Operations Center (AAOC). The "Blue Room" was recessed in a pit with a stage, blue walls, blue overhead fluorescent illumination, and more than 12 blue consoles. In the rear of the AAOC was the highest "third row [with] a "friendly protector" console, three tactical monitor consoles, and a tactical director's console. The defense commander's room...at the top rear" had a window for viewing into the AAOC. The AAOC crew was typically 22 soldiers and 5 company grade officers.

Via an automated data link (ADL) of digital information, the AN/FSG-1 communicated the identification friend or foe status from the AADCP to remote fire units where a "foe" symbol was placed "around each radar return on the scope". The AN/FSG-1 assigned a Nike fire unit to a target using the same ATABE "programmed selection logic" as the USAF SAGE system, and the algorithm could be tested using a simulator (a "20-target raid...with maneuvering targets, takes approximately 1 1/4 minutes.") When the AN/FSG-1 had automatically assigned a battery to a foe, a technician used the "entry stick" to alert the battery to "prepare to engage" (e.g., lock the Target Tracking Radar on the target). The director's console was subsequently used to manually input the attack command, and the AN/FSG-1 transmitted a change to the foe symbol at the designated fire unit where the Battery Control Officer reacted to the symbol and issued the firing order to a ready missile. The AN/FSG-1 also provided a communication function previously performed by the Interim Battery Data Link (IBDL) system which had transmitted the "missile away" notification from the firing battery to other sites, allowing "battery commanders to see which targets were being engaged by other batteries".

External images
- console images
- AN/FSG-1 promotion booklet
- Niagara console

== See also ==
- List of military electronics of the United States
