= Army Air Defense Command (United States) =

Former U.S. Army command dedicated to anti-aircraft warfare

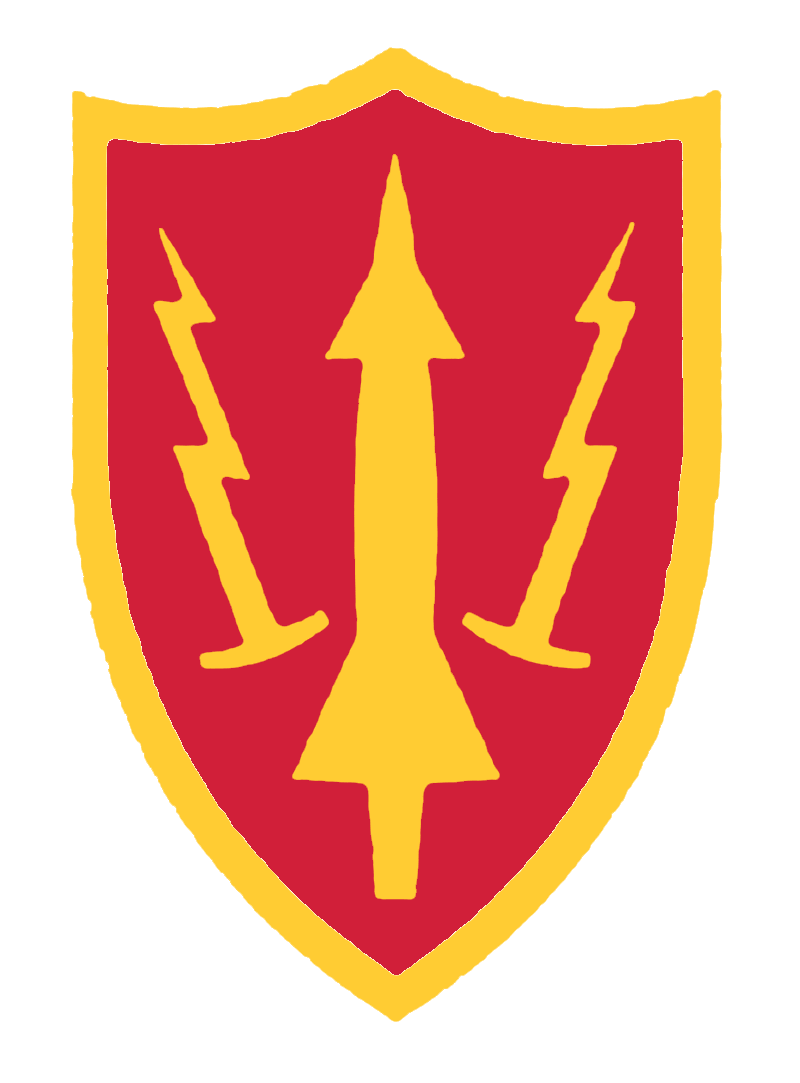
- Active: 1957–1974
- Country: United States
- Branch: United States Army
- Role: Air defense
- Size: Command
- Garrison/HQ: Ent Air Force Base, Colorado Springs

Insignia
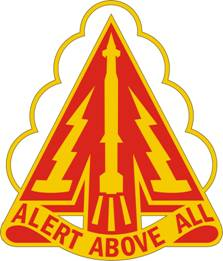
- Army Air Defense Command DUI

United States Army Air Defense Command, (ARADCOM) previously Army Anti-Aircraft Command, (ARAACOM) was a major command of the United States Army which existed from 1957 to 1974.

== History ==
The ARAACOM was created in 1950, being redesignated ARADCOM in 1957. ARAACOM was formed to command Army units allocated to the air defense of the Continental United States. The command was also charged with becoming the Army component of a joint continental defense force, if and when the joint force was designated.

Army Anti-Aircraft Command (ARAACOM) was created on 29 June 1950. Eastern and Western Army Antiaircraft Commands were established with HQ at Stewart Air Force Base, New York, and Hamilton Air Force Base, California, on 1 September 1950. Anti-Aircraft Command moved to Mitchel Air Force Base, New York on 1 November 1950.

On 10 April 1951, the Major General Willard W. Irvine assumed command of all anti-aircraft (AAA) units allocated to continental air defense. On 24 April Central Army Anti-Aircraft Command (CARAACOM) was established with headquarters in Kansas City, Missouri. On 31 May 1955 Eastern ARAACOM was disestablished and personnel assigned to the 1st AAA Region.

In 1955, numbering started to replace geographic locations to designate regions. The 1st, 2nd and 5th Regions (plus the 53rd Antiaircraft Artillery Brigade) now covered the area once called Eastern ARAACOM. In 1956, Western ARAACOM became 6th Region, and the following year, Central became the 4th Region. Areas of responsibility between regions and brigades continued to shift throughout the life of the command.

On March 21, 1957, ARAACOM was renamed to U.S. Army Air Defense Command (ARADCOM).

== Organization (1966) ==
- 1st Region - Fort Totten, New York. Moved to Stewart AFB, NY around 1966. The 17th Artillery Group defended Baltimore, Maryland, from 1952. The 56th Air Defense Artillery Brigade, at Fort Totten and then Fort Devens, Massachusetts, controlled the Providence and Boston air defense battalions, a total of five. The 11th Artillery Group, activated in May 1955 at Camp Stewart, GA., controlled the Savannah River Defense Area from its arrival in May 1958. The Defense Area included the 33rd, 425th, and 478th AAA Battalions, though the 478th was deactivated 15 Feb 1958, and the other two battalions appear to have possibly fused into 4th Battalion, 7th Air Defense Artillery Regiment, on 1 September 1958. The 11th Artillery Group was deactivated August 1960, seemingly at Rehoboth, Massachusetts. 31st Artillery Brigade (Air Defense) served as part of the region while at Lockport Air Force Station, NY.
- 2d Region - Richards-Gebaur AFB, Missouri. The 2nd ARADCOM Region was activated on 1 March 1951 at Fort George G. Meade, MD, and inactivated on 30 June 1971. At Oklahoma City Air Force Station, 9/63, Richards-Gebaur AFB (12/69), and then Selfridge Air Force Base. 35th Air Defense Artillery Brigade controlled the Washington DC defenses from Fort Meade until it was deactivated in December 1973. Thereafter the 23rd Air Defense Artillery Group stood watch from Meade until 1 September 1974. The Group had previously been part of the New York defenses, and before that, a field artillery group in Long Binh, South Vietnam.
- 5th Region - Fort Sheridan, Illinois. Project Nike Integrated Fire Control Site C-80 of the 45th Antiaircraft Brigade opened at Arlington Field in 1955. The brigade was active in the region, later becoming 45th Artillery Brigade (Air Defense). The 45th Air Defense Artillery Brigade controlled the Chicago-Gary Defense Area (10 missile batteries and their Integrated Fire Control sites) from the Arlington Heights Army Air Defense Site. 5th Region moved to Maxwell AFB, AL, early 1966. 5th Battalion, 562nd Air Defense Artillery Regiment maintained the Barksdale Defense Area until 1966.
- 6th Region - Fort Baker, California. Activated as Western ARAACOM in September 1950. To Fort Baker in 1951, according to Rings of Supersonic Steel (p. 153). Disestablished 1 August 1974. 29th Artillery Group (Air Defense) was active around the Travis AFB Defense Area, supervising the Nike-equipped 1st Battalion, 61st Air Defense Artillery Regiment and other units. The 40th Artillery Brigade (AD) was established on 23 January 1959 at Fort Barry, moved to Fort Winfield Scott, and deactivated 23 January 1971. The 114th Artillery Brigade (AD) (CA ARNG) was active between 1959 and 1963, along with the 233rd Artillery Group, both in San Francisco. The 13th Artillery Group, which replaced the 40th Brigade in the Bay Area, was activated in March 1958 at Fort Stewart, GA., deployed to southwest Miami, moved to Homestead AFB in November 1968, Snelling Air Force Station (June 1971), and then the Presidio of San Francisco, where it appears to have deactivated on 1 August 1974.
- 7th Region - McChord Air Force Base, Washington (July 1960 to 1 April 1966). 31st Air Defense Artillery Brigade, at McChord AFB, transferred to Lockport Air Force Station, NY, in December 1961. Also present were HQ 26th Artillery Group (AD) (12/61-3/66) at Fort Lawton which replaced the 31st Brigade when it moved, and HQ 49th ADA Group (3/66-8/74). With the 7th ARADCOM Region being disbanded on 1 April 1966, the areas of responsibility of the 1st, 2nd, 5th, and 6th ARADCOM Regions were reorganized. The 115th Artillery Brigade (Air Defense) was a corresponding Washington Army National Guard formation.

The NORAD-CONAD History for the first part of 1965 says that the 53d Antiaircraft Artillery Brigade Headquarters was to move from Maxwell AFB to McChord AFB and the personnel of the discontinued 7th Region transferred to it. The personnel of the 53rd at Maxwell AFB were to be transferred to the 5th Region. The 1st Region Headquarters was also moving from Fort Totten, NY, to Stewart AFB, NY, because Fort Totten was being closed (this may have been in 1974).

ARADCOM strength peaked in 1963, with 184 firing units (134 Regular Army Nike-Hercules, 50 National Guard). However, beginning in September 1968, the command was reduced in strength to 87 batteries. On February 4, 1974, the U.S. Department of Defense announced that ARADCOM would be inactivated, apart from the 31st Air Defense Artillery Brigade, which had been activated during the Cuban Missile Crisis (October 1962) and would remain on duty in southern Florida. By December 31, 1974, ARADCOM's remaining regional headquarters, eight groups, 13 battalion headquarters, and 48 Hercules firing batteries were closed out. ARADCOM headquarters was inactivated January 4, 1975.

== Commanders ==
- MG Willard W. Irvine July 1950-May 1952
- LTG John T. Lewis May 1952-September 1954
- LTG Stanley R. Mickelsen October 1954-October 1957
- LTG Charles E. Hart November 1957-July 1960
- LTG Robert J. Wood August 1960-May 1962
- LTG William W. Dick, Jr. May 1962-August 1963
- LTG Charles B. Duff August 1963-July 1966
- LTG Robert Hackett August 1966-June 1968
- LTG George V. Underwood Jr. July 1968-1971
- LTG Richard T. Cassidy 1971-1973
- LTG Raymond L. Shoemaker, Jr. 1973-1974

== See also ==
- Air Defense Artillery Branch (United States)
- Anti-Aircraft Command, British equivalent (1939–55)
- 213th Artillery Group, Pennsylvania Army National Guard (1959-71)
