= Selfridge AFB radar station =

Military facility

Selfridge AFB Army Air Defense Command Post
- Detroit Defense Area, Michigan
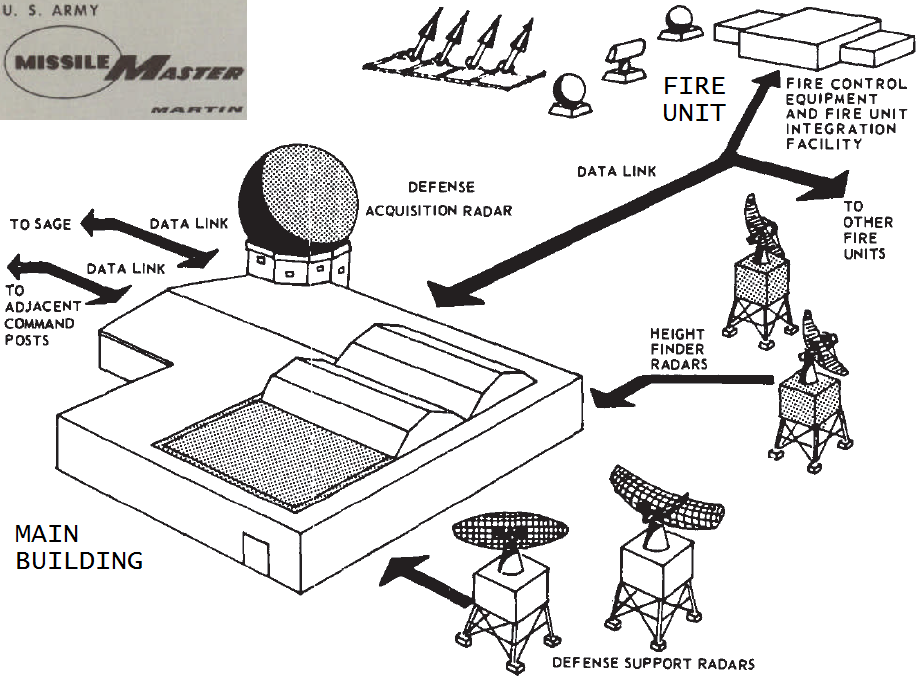
- The Selfridge AADCP networked local radars (middle, bottom) and directed Michigan's Nike fire units--each with a network of 3 radars (top) for acquiring the target, tracking the target, and tracking/guiding the Nike missile.

Site information
- Type: Army command and control facility

Location
- Coordinates: 42°37′37″N 82°49′47″W

External images
- 1960 radar station w/ tower (bunker site to left)
- Missile Master complex in 1961 & c2004
- radar station & "GATR site"

The Selfridge AFB radar station is a United States military facility in Michigan. It began operations in 1949 with a Bendix AN/CPS-5 Radar test that tracked aircraft at 210 mi (340 km). A height finder MIT AN/CPS-4 Radar was added by March 9, 1950; and the station was site L-17 of the Lashup Radar Network and site LP-17 of the subsequent network during construction of the Air Defense Command permanent network. The 661st Aircraft Control and Warning Squadron was activated at Selfridge in 1951, and with a pair of General Electric AN/CPS-6 Radars, the station became site LP-20 of the permanent ADC network in 1952. In 1957 the station added a height finder General Electric AN/FPS-6 Radar. The station became part of the Semi Automatic Ground Environment radar network in 1959, supplying radar tracks to SAGE data center DC-06 at Custer Air Force Station, Michigan, for directing interceptor aircraft and CIM-10 Bomarc air defense missiles.

By 1960, the AN/CPS-6 radar had been replaced by a Bendix AN/FPS-20 Radar for general surveillance, and the site had an additional General Electric AN/FPS-6A height-finder radar. A Sperry AN/FPS-35 radar installed at the station's tower in 1961 became operational in 1962, and the AN/FPS-6A height-finder was replaced with an Avco AN/FPS-26A Radar c. 1963. On 31 July 1963, Selfridge AFB was redesignated as NORAD site Z-20.

The 661st AC & WS also operated Gap Filler sites with Bendix AN/FPS-18 Radars before inactivating on July 1, 1974. The radar station was shared with the United States Army for Nike missile command-and-control.

In 1960, Army Air Defense Command Post (AADCP) D-15DC was constructed for coordinating Nike surface-to-air missile launches from numerous Michigan batteries from Algonac/Marine City (D-17) south to Carleton (D-57) & Newport (D-58). The AADCP closed when the Army deactivated the remaining D-06, D-58, & D-87 batteries in April 1974 at Utica, Newport, and Commerce/Union Lake.

The former radar station is the location of a United States Marine Corps Reserve unit and the Selfridge Military Air Museum & Air Park. The Missile Master bunker was subsequently used as an air traffic control center staffed by the 2031st Communications Squadron. Documents regarding the bunker, demolished in 2005, have been entered in the Historic American Engineering Record.
