= AN/GSA-51 Radar Course Directing Group =

The Burroughs AN/GSA-51 Radar Course Directing Group was a United States Air Force air defense command, control, and coordination system, part of the Semi-Automatic Ground Environment system. It was intended to replace vacuum tube IBM AN/FSQ-7 Combat Direction Centrals. Developed under Electronic Systems Division's 416M Program, in 1962 Burroughs "won the contract to provide a military version of its D825" modular data processing system for the AN/GSA-51 to be used at "BUIC II radar sites" (follow-on to the initial Back-Up Interceptor Control System, BUIC) BUIC II was 1st used at North Truro Z-10 in 1966, and the Hamilton AFB BUIC II was installed in the former MCC building.

The first D825 computer was originally built for the Navy Research Laboratory with a designation of AN/GYK-3(V). The D825 contained between one and four 48 bit central processor/arithmetic units, up to 16 memory modules and up to 20 IO modules. The BUIC systems used "two computer modules, six memory modules and three input/output modules". The computer was designed for high availability and could still operate if any one of its modules failed.

In accordance with the Joint Electronics Type Designation System (JETDS), the "AN/GSA-51" designation represents the 51st design of an Army-Navy electronic device for ground special auxiliary system. The JETDS system also now is used to name all Department of Defense electronic systems.
