= Fort Lawton Air Force Station =

Defunct US airforce radar station

Fort Lawton Air Force Station
- Part of Air Defense Command (ADC)

Site information
- Type: Air Force Station
- Code: ADC ID: RP-1, NORAD ID: Z-1
- Controlled by: United States Air Force

Location
- Location of Fort Lawton AFS, Washington
- Coordinates: 47°39′27″N 122°24′47″W

Site history
- Built: 1961
- In use: 1961–1963

Garrison information
- Garrison: 635th Aircraft Control and Warning Squadron

Fort Lawton Air Force Station is a closed United States Air Force General Surveillance Radar station. It is located on Fort Lawton in the Magnolia neighborhood of northwest Seattle, Washington. The Air Force inactivated its unit in 1963; while the site remained under Army control until 1974. Today the Federal Aviation Administration (FAA) operates the site as part of the Joint Surveillance System (JSS).

== History ==
The station was established at Fort Lawton, Washington on 1 April 1960 by Air Defense Command. The station was established as a consolidation of Army and Air Force radar units in the Seattle area due to funding reductions. Fort Lawton AFS was given the ADC designation "RP-1", as it replaced the radars at McChord AFB which were relocated as part of the consolidation. In addition, the station was a joint-use facility with the Federal Aviation Administration (FAA).

The Army established Army Air Defense Command Post S-90DC at the station for Nike missile command-and-control functions. The station was initially an AN/FSG-l Missile-Master Nike Radar Direction Center. It was later equipped with the AN/GSG-5(V) BIRDIE solid-state computer system. Among the Army air defense units operating in the area were the 26th Artillery Group (Air Defense) (1961–1966), 49th Artillery Group (AD) (1966–1974), 433d AA Battalion (1955–56), 4th Battalion, 4th Air Defense Artillery Regiment (1964–1972), and 1st Battalion, 4th ADA (1972–1974).

The Air Force 635th Aircraft Control and Warning Squadron worked jointly with Army radar controllers at the station. The site used an FAA ARSR-1C search radar and two Air Force AN/FPS-6A height-finder radars. (The Army also had 2 AN/FPS-6 variant height-finder radars of their own.) On 11 June, Fort Lawton AFS joined the Semi Automatic Ground Environment (SAGE) system, feeding data to DC-12 at McChord AFB. After joining, the squadron was re-designated as the 635th Radar Squadron (SAGE). The radar squadron provided information 24/7 the SAGE Direction Center where it was analyzed to determine range, direction altitude speed and whether aircraft were friendly or hostile.

In addition to the main facility, Fort Lawton operated an AN/FPS-14 Gap Filler site:

- Chehalis, WA (RP-1C/P-1C) 46°33′17″N 123°03′31″W

In late 1962, an AN/FPS-26 height-finder radar was installed. On 31 December 1962, Air Force moved the 635th RADS to Dauphin Island AFS, Alabama, however a detachment operated at Fort Lawton until March 1963. The Army continued operations at the site until the AADCP was inactivated 1 September 1974.

The Fort Lawton radar site remains in use by the FAA today, still operating the ARSR-1E search radar.

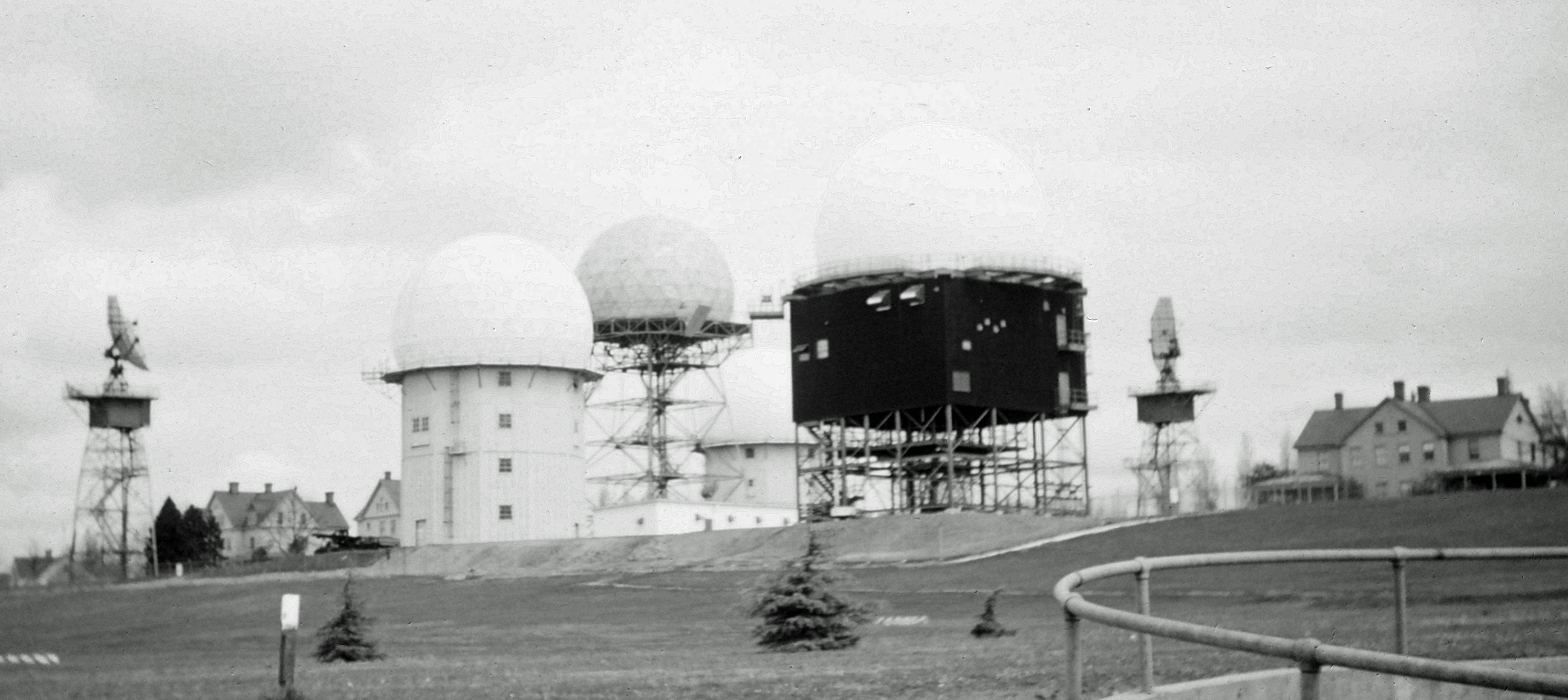
This image shows several types of radar systems, operated by several agencies, at Ft Lawton, WA. The two radars without radomes are US Army FPS-6 heightfinders; the radome with an open steel grid support structure is a search radar operated by the Federal Aviation Administration; the two radars with radomes and white clad support structure are US Air Force FPS-6A heightfinders; and the radome in the foreground with dark-clad support structure is a US Air Force FPS-26A, nearing construction completion here c. 1962.

== See also ==
- List of USAF Aerospace Defense Command General Surveillance Radar Stations
- List of United States Air Force aircraft control and warning squadrons

== Bibliography ==
- A Handbook of Aerospace Defense Organization 1946–1980, by Lloyd H. Cornett and Mildred W. Johnson, Office of History, Aerospace Defense Center, Peterson Air Force Base, Colorado
- Winkler, David F. (1997), "Searching the skies: the legacy of the United States Cold War defense radar program". Prepared for United States Air Force Headquarters Air Combat Command.
- Information for Fort Lawton AFS, WA
