= Air Route Surveillance Radar =

Radar system of the United States used to monitor internal and border airspace

Air Route Surveillance Radar ARSR−1, −2, −3, −4
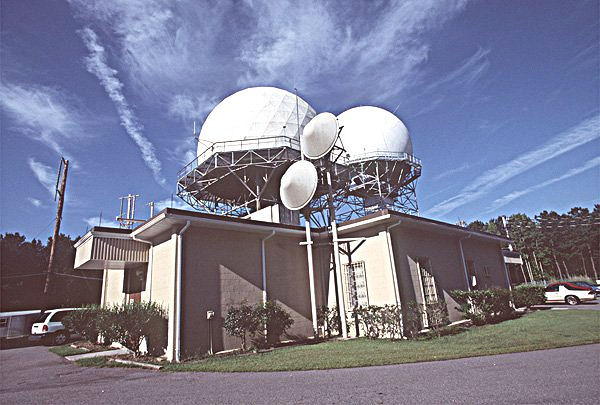
- ARSR-4 installation at Summerville, South Carolina; 33°04′11″N 080°13′14″W
- Country of origin: United States
- Manufacturer: Northrop Grumman
- Introduced: 1958; 67 years ago
- Type: Long range surveillance 3D radar
- Frequency: L band; 1.215–1.4 GHz (24.7–21.4 cm)
- Beamwidth: 1.5º
- Pulsewidth: 150 μsec
- RPM: 5 RPM
- Range: 250 nmi (460 km; 290 mi)
- Altitude: 100,000 ft (30,000 m)
- Azimuth: 360º
- Elevation: -7º to 30º
- Precision: 3,000 ft (910 m)
- Power: 65 kW peak; 3.5 kW average
- Other names: Common ARSR (CARSR); AN/FPS-130

The Air Route Surveillance Radar is a long-range radar system. It is used by the United States Air Force and the Federal Aviation Administration to control airspace within and around the borders of the United States.

The ARSR-4 is the FAA's most recent (late 1980s, early 1990s) addition to the "Long Range" series of radars. It is a solid state Westinghouse system with a 250-nautical-mile (460 km; 290 mi) range. The ARSR-4 features a "look down" capability that enables the radar to detect aircraft attempting to elude detection by flying at low altitudes, advanced clutter reduction via hardware and software post-processing, and enhanced poor-weather object detection. A beacon system, the ATCBI-6M (a monopulse system), is installed along with each ARSR-4. However, since the ARSR-4 has 3D capabilities, it can determine altitude independently of its associated beacon (albeit less accurately).

ARSR-4 systems are installed along the borders and coastal areas of the contiguous United States, Guantanamo Bay Naval Base in Cuba, the municipality of Yigo on Guam, and a training site at the FAA's Mike Monroney Aeronautical Center in Oklahoma City. They are generally unmanned, and are equipped with remote monitoring of both the radar data and the status of the radar's health and environment. It has expanded to additional sites throughout the entire contiguous US (or CONUS).

== History ==
Raytheon introduced ARSR-1 in 1958 operating in the L-band. At that time it had a maximum range of 170 nautical miles; 320 kilometres (200 mi). ARSR-2 was developed in the 1960s, also with a 200-mile range. From a user perspective, the ARSR-1 and ARSR-2 function nearly identically. Components that had proved troublesome in the ARSR-1 were redesigned in order to improve reliability. Existing ARSR-1 systems were retrofitted with the more reliable ARSR-2 components. All ARSR-1/2 systems have been upgraded with modern Common ARSR systems (CARSR).

Vacuum tubes were still in use nationwide prior to the upgrade.

All ARSR-1/2s were replaced by Common ARSR by the end of 2015. CARSR has a 200-nautical-mile (370 km; 230 mi) range, and shares transmitter components and software with the FAA's new airport surveillance radar, the ASR-11. Like the ASR-11, CARSR is completely solid state.

Westinghouse built ARSR-3. ARSR-3 and 3D search radar were used by the FAA in the Joint Surveillance System (JSS). The radar operated in the L-band at 1250 to 1350 MHz and detected targets at distances beyond 210 nautical miles; 390 kilometres (240 mi). The D model had height-finder capability.

Westinghouse also built ARSR-4 3-D air surveillance radar in the 1990s for the JSS. By the late 1990s, this radar had replaced most of the 1960s-vintage AN/FPS-20 variant search radars and a number of ARSR-3 search radars under the "FAA/Air Force Radar Replacement" (FARR) program.

In the use of the United States Air Force, the ARSR-4 is known as the AN/FPS-130. In accordance with the Joint Electronics Type Designation System (JETDS), the "AN/FPS-130" designation represents the 130th design of an Army-Navy electronic device for a fixed (not transportable) search radar. The JETDS system is also now used to name US Air Force and some NATO electronics systems.
