= Lockport Air Force Station =

Closed radar station

- Part of 1951-1968: Air Defense Command; 1968-1979: Aerospace Defense Command
- Cambria, New York

Site information
- Type: Long Range Radar Site
- Code: P-21 / Z-21
- Controlled by: United States Air Force

Location
- Coordinates: 43°08′25″N 78°50′0.4″W

Site history
- Built: 1951
- Built by: U.S. Air Force
- In use: 1951-1979

Garrison information
- Garrison: Lockport, New York

Lockport Air Force Station is a closed United States Air Force ADCOM General Surveillance Radar station in Cambria, New York.

== History ==
Initially established at Fort Niagara in 1950 before relocating to Lockport site. It was a joint USAF and US Army station from 1951 to 1969. The Air Defense squadron inactivated on 29 June 1979. The key infrastructure like the three radomes (AN/FPS-7 and twin AN/FPS-6 radars) have been demolished. Today the former station is partially vacant with base apartments for private use and commercial redevelopment.

It was a part of the RCC (NORAD Regional Control Center) a SAGE network, located at Syracuse AFS.

== Units ==
- 763rd Aircraft Control and Warning Squadron - 1950
- 763rd Radar Squadron (SAGE) - 1959
- 763rd Radar Squadron - 1974

== Assignments ==
- 540th Aircraft Control and Warning Group 1951-1952
- 32nd Air Division 1952-1953
- 4704th Defense Wing 1953-1956
- 4708th Defense Wing 1956
- 30th Air Division 1956-1958
- Syracuse Air Defense Sector 1958-1963
- 2nd Artillery Group (Air Defense) 1961-1969
- Detroit Air Defense Sector 1963-1966
- 34th Air Division 1966-1969
- 35th Air Division 1969
- 21st Air Division 1969-1979
