= AN/TSQ-51 Air Defense Command and Coordination System =

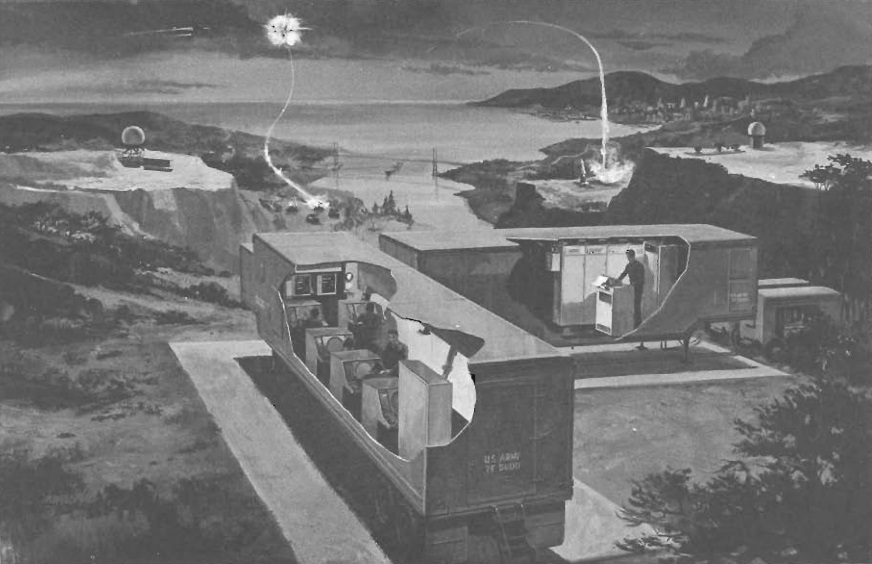
AN/TSQ-51 concept drawing

The AN/TSQ-51 Air Defense Command and Coordination System developed by Hughes was a transportable electronic fire distribution center for automated command and control of remote Nike missile launch batteries. The radar netting system replace the vacuum tube AN/FSG-1 in 6 United States Missile Master bunkers after the upgrade was approved by the United States Department of Defense in 1963; and additional deployments were at Homestead-Miami, Florida, and Providence, Rhode Island, to replace Battery Integration and Radar DIsplay Equipment (BIRDIE) systems; as well as at San Francisco. As with the AN/FSG-1, the AN/TSQ-51 could provide fire control for 24 Nike batteries, but the smaller AN/TSQ-51 could be fielded in 2 trailers.

In accordance with the Joint Electronics Type Designation System (JETDS), the "AN/TSQ-51" designation represents the 51st design of an Army-Navy electronic device for ground transportable special combination equipment. The JETDS system also now is used to name all Department of Defense electronic systems.

== See also ==
- List of military electronics of the United States
