= AN/FSQ-8 Combat Control Central =

United States Air Force computerized command and control system

The AN/FSQ-8 Combat Control Central was a United States Air Force computerized command and control system. Several of the centrals were used in the Semi-Automatic Ground Environment (SAGE) air defense network for Cold War ground-controlled interception to give "each combat center the capability to coordinate defense for the whole nation". Each AN/FSQ-8 was a smaller variant of the AN/FSQ-7 Combat Direction Central with less equipment since the Q8 received processed air defense data from AN/FSQ-7 centrals at Direction Centers. The AN/FSQ-8 centrals were housed in eight 3-story SAGE Combat Center (SCC) buildings similar to the Direction Center building (some were colocated) and the Q8s allowed "supervision of the several sectors within the division." The Combat Centers "forwarded the divisional air defense status to" NORAD (initially at Ent AFB in 1957, the Chidlaw Building in 1963, and the Cheyenne Mountain Complex in 1966).

In accordance with the Joint Electronics Type Designation System (JETDS), the "AN/FSQ-8" designation represents the 8th design of an Army-Navy electronic device for fixed special combination system. The JETDS system also now is used to name all Department of Defense electronic systems.

== Technology ==
The AN/FSQ-8 Combat Control Central, similar to the AN/FSQ-7 Combat Direction Central had four main systems used to create commands for the United States Air Force. This includes an input system, display system, and the output system. All three of these were process or controlled by a central computer system.

The input system focused on processing manual input or autonomous information coming from radar equipment. Examples of radar detection data would be any plane detected approaching the United States, or already within its border. This information was then transformed into computer-readable data stored in magnetic drum memory. This input system is similar to that of which found in the AN/FSQ-7 Combat Direction Central.

The magnetic drum system retained the processed data until needed for processing. The drum memory unit responsible for input data had four sections. These included manual input coming from system operators via punch cards or light guns, from gap-filler radars, long-range radar, and intel coming from other control centers.

Information stored from the input would then be processed by the central computer system using technology created by IBM. This system performed as a rudimentary modern CPU, containing auxiliary data storage drums acting as RAM would in today's computers. Additionally, this system was capable on running programs concerned with logic and arithmetic focused on processing the input data into tactical military information for the control center and sending the output back to the drum memory used for the display system.

The processed data is then able to be displayed via the drum storage and cathode-ray tube displays(CRT). The displays on the AN/FSQ-8 Combat Control Central and AN/FSQ-7 Combat Direction Central are similar, except for the former having a simpler layout and fewer displays. The centerpiece of the displays was a CRT designated for showing the current plane positions and geographical information. The situation display could be adjusted via light guns and keyboard inputs. Non display information could be transmitted by an auxiliary console which focused on handling ground to ground, military messages, or commands for defense systems. It may be important to note that the AN/FSQ-8 did not send ground to air messages, but the AN/FSQ-7 did.

== Differences with the AN/FSQ-7 ==
Differences between the AN/FSQ-7 & -8
Combat Direction Central	Combat Control Central
Computer program: Direction Center Active (DCA)	Control Center Active (CCA) (no ATABE fire distribution algorithm)
Long-range Radar Input (LRI) & consoles	"not included"
Gap-filler Radar Input (GFI)	"not included"
Ground-to-air (G/A) message transmission	not included
Automatic Initiation Area Discriminator	not included
Core Memory Bank 1: 65,536 words	4096 words
1st test memory location: 3.77760_{8}	0.20000_{8}

== See also ==
- List of military electronics of the United States
