= Missile Master =

Type of US Army Missile Command installation

- CA IL MA MD MI NJ(2) NY PA WA
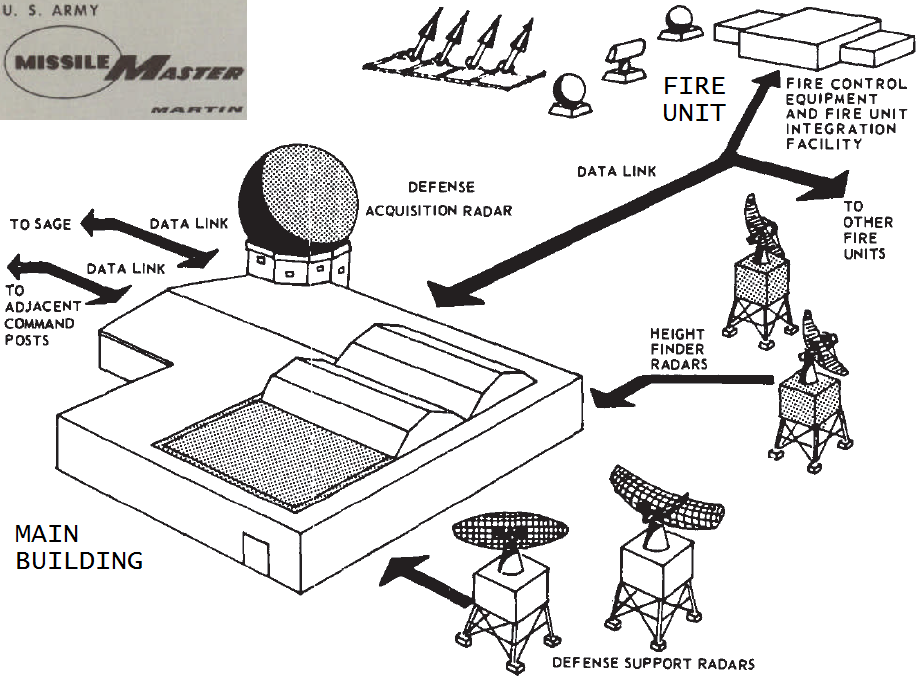
- The Missile Master was a complex with a main building containing a computer system and with local radars (5 in this depiction) for command and control of "up to 24 Nike Hercules AD missile batteries" (1 shown). The nuclear bunker's raised roof sections held HVAC equipment to collect hot air from the electronic equipment below, and the shaded roof area denotes the interior location of the Antiaircraft Operations Center (AAOC).

Site information
- Type: military installations

Missile Master was a US Army surface-to-air missile control complex/facility. It controlled Project Nike missiles. Virtually all Missile Masters had a bunker housing the Martin AN/FSG-1 Antiaircraft Defense System, as well as additional structures for "an AN/FPS-33 defense acquisition radar (DAR) or similar radar, two height-finder radars," and identification friend or foe secondary radar (e.g., AN/TPX-19 radar interrogator). The radars, along with Automated Data Links (ADL) from remote Nike firing units, provided data into the AN/FSG-1 tracking subsystem with the DAR providing surveillance coverage to about 200 miles (320 km).

== Siting ==
Missile Master radars and the control bunker were usually co-located. Sometimes they were co-located with a USAF radar station such as the Arlington Heights Army Installation. Conversely, the Fort MacArthur Direction Center used radars ~3 mi (4.8 km) away at San Pedro Hill AFS. The single-site Camp Pedricktown Army Air Defense Base was later reconfigured to use radar data from Gibbsboro AFS 15 mi (24 km) away.

== Nuclear bunker ==
The Missile Master's two-story fallout-proof & blast-resistant "main building" housed the AN/FSG-1 crew consoles in the "Blue Room" (tiered Antiaircraft Operations Center, AAOC). The bunker also included an entrance room with decontamination shower, commander's office; separate rooms for the AN/FSG-1 computer (rows of racks/boxes), storage, ADL, and other system equipment; utility rooms for HVAC and other support systems, and a decontamination water storage room under the AAOC. "Our radar must be kept above ground. If that goes, we are out of business anyway" (BGen Robert A. Hewitt), so a less expensive and more vulnerable partially exposed bunker was acceptable for the AN/FSG-1. "Autonomous Operations" allowed remote missile batteries surviving a nuclear strike to launch without AADCP inputs.

== Construction ==
Installation of a Missile Master took approximately 18 months and required an AN/TSQ-8 Fire Unit Integration Facility (FUIF) be installed at each Nike fire unit to provide the ADL interface between the AN/FSG-1 and the fire control system. The Highlands Army Air Defense Site was completed at an existing SAGE radar station and cost ~$2 million for the new equipment and ~$2 million for the structures: 170 ft × 90 ft (52 m × 27 m) bunker, power building, and 4 radar towers (a Missile Master at a new radar station was $9 million). Additional equipment and facilities included tankage for electricity generator fuel, storage for drinking & decontamination water, telephone lines, etc. In addition to the Martin Company's AN/FSG-1 subcontractors, the Corps of Engineers hired local construction contractors for the facility structures, e.g., Kirkland Construction for Ft Heath and Rust Engineering for the Oakdale Army Installation (the Corps tailored the bunker to each site from the "baseline standard drawings".) Each Missile Master had 200 total personnel, and maintenance of the AN/FSG-1, the radars, and other systems was provided by an Army "Signal Missile Master Support Detachment" of 10-15 soldiers. All of the vacuum tube AN/FSG-1 computers were replaced prior to the end of Project Nike.

== Closure ==
External image
- Ft Meade building
- empty Highlands bunker in 2008
- bunker floor plan
- Arlington Heights AI bunker
- 1961 Arlington Heights site (5 radars)
- Ft MacArthur bunker
- sketch of Oakdale complex

Army Air Defense Command Posts (AADCPs) were still at 5 Missile Masters on July 1, 1973 (CA IL MD NJ WA—all with AN/TSQ-51 CCCS except the Ft Lawton BIRDIE) prior to the Army's February 4, 1974, announcement to end Project Nike. The Camp Pedricktown site was designated an historic site in 1998 by the Salem Historic Preservation Office, and documents regarding the Selfridge site have been entered in the Historical American Engineering Record. In 1999 a romantic comedy set at a midwest US Army missile post was published as a paperback with the name Missile Master (the Kansas and Nebraska AADCPs had BIRDIES and never had bunkers.)
