= Nuclear ethics =

Academic and policy-relevant field on problems in the nuclear weapons and energy complex

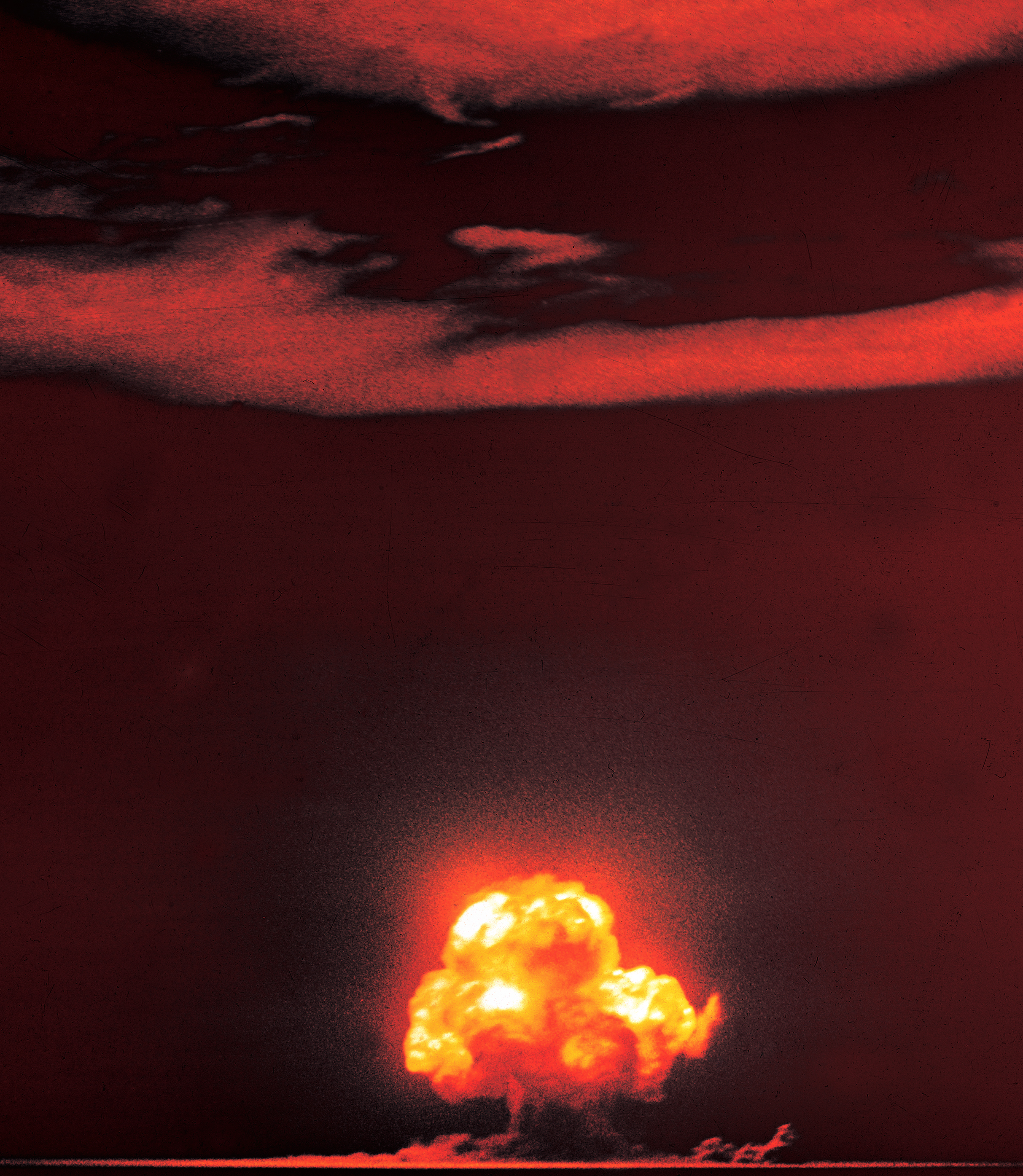
Trinity shot color

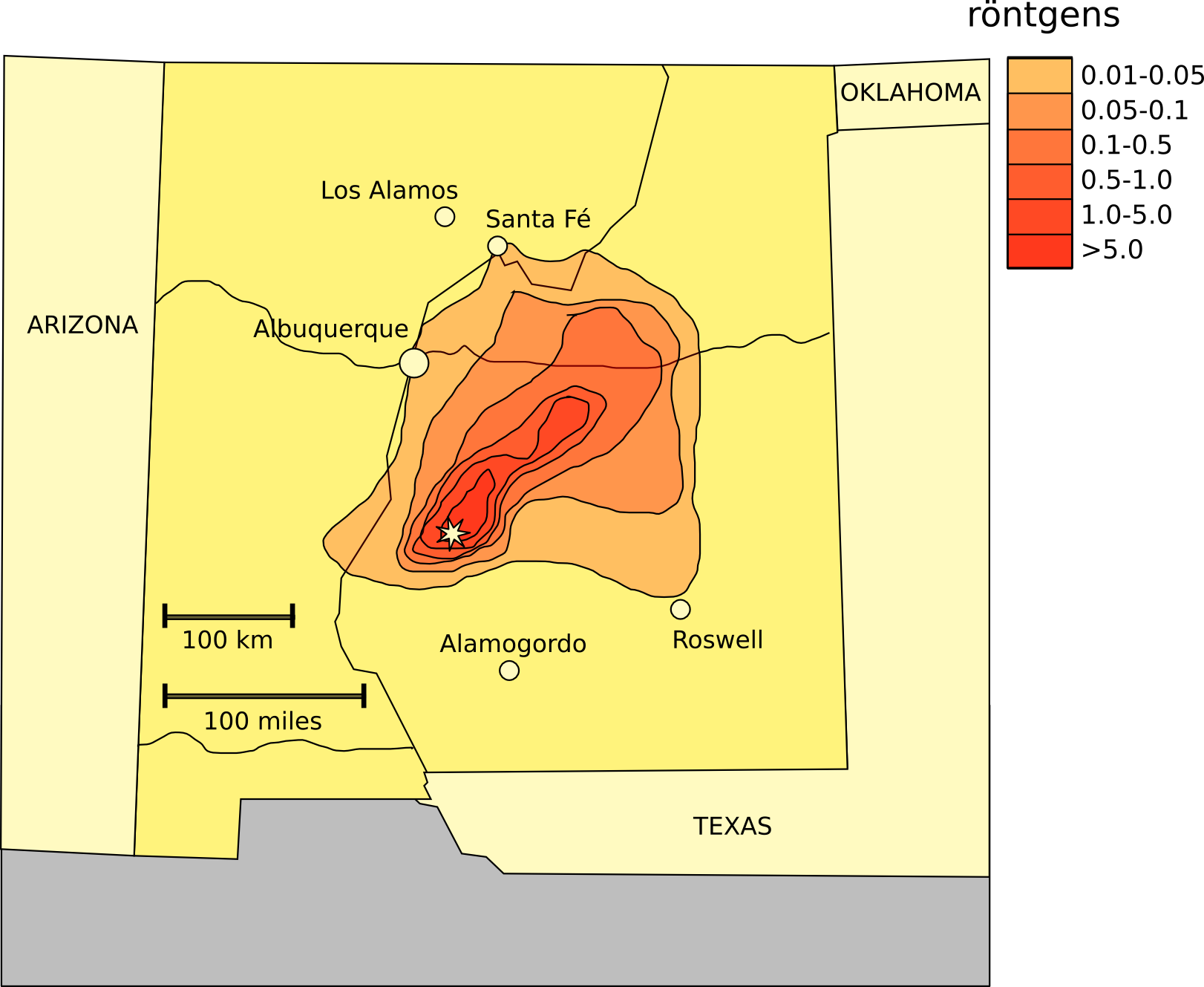
Trinity fallout

Nuclear ethics is a cross-disciplinary field of academic and policy-relevant study in which the problems associated with nuclear warfare, nuclear deterrence, nuclear arms control, nuclear disarmament, or nuclear energy are examined through one or more ethical or moral theories or frameworks.

Nuclear ethics assumes that the very real possibilities of human extinction, mass human destruction, or mass environmental damage which could result from nuclear warfare are deep ethical or moral problems. Specifically, it assumes that the outcomes of human extinction, mass human destruction, or environmental damage count as moral evils. Another area of inquiry concerns future generations and the burden that nuclear waste and pollution imposes on them. Some scholars have concluded that it is therefore morally wrong to act in ways that produce these outcomes, which means it is morally wrong to engage in nuclear warfare.

Nuclear ethics is interested in examining policies of nuclear deterrence, nuclear arms control and disarmament, and nuclear energy insofar as they are linked to the cause or prevention of nuclear warfare. Ethical justifications of nuclear deterrence, for example, emphasize its role in preventing great power nuclear war since the end of World War II. Indeed, some scholars claim that nuclear deterrence seems to be the morally rational response to a nuclear-armed world. Moral condemnation of nuclear deterrence, in contrast, emphasizes the seemingly inevitable violations of human and democratic rights which arise. In contemporary security studies, the problems of nuclear warfare, deterrence, proliferation, and so forth are often understood strictly in political, strategic, or military terms. In the study of international organizations and law, however, these problems are also understood in legal terms.

Nuclear technology has seen the formation of an anti-nuclear movement since its early development, and grew with the increased impact of it, particularly nuclear weapons testing, caused the deaths of up to 43 thousand people until 2020.

== Early ethical issues ==
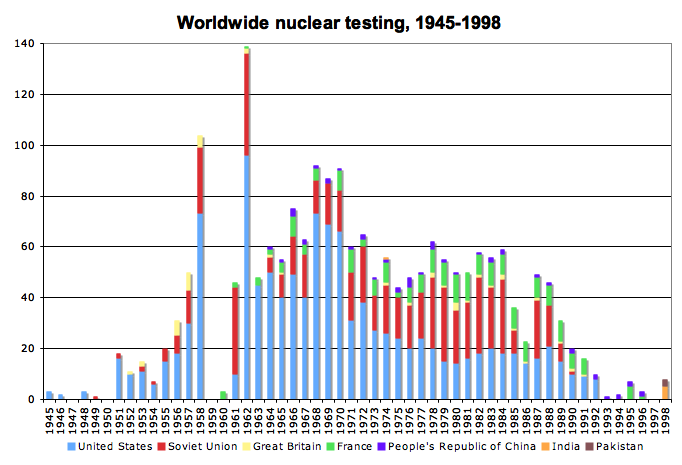
Worldwide nuclear testing totals, 1945–1998.

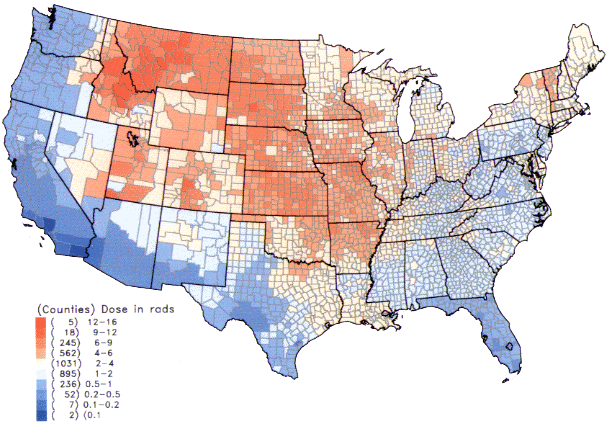
US fallout exposure

The application of nuclear technology, both as a source of energy and as an instrument of war, has been controversial.

Even before the first nuclear weapons had been developed, scientists involved with the Manhattan Project were divided over the use of the weapon. The role of the two atomic bombings of the country in Japan's surrender and the U.S.'s ethical justification for them has been the subject of scholarly and popular debate for decades. The question of whether nations should have nuclear weapons, or test them, has been continually and nearly universally controversial.

The public became concerned about nuclear weapons testing from about 1954, following extensive nuclear testing in the Pacific Ocean. In 1961, at the height of the Cold War, about 50,000 women brought together by Women Strike for Peace marched in 60 cities in the United States to demonstrate against nuclear weapons. In 1963, many countries ratified the Partial Test Ban Treaty which prohibited atmospheric nuclear testing.

Some local opposition to nuclear power emerged in the early 1960s, and in the late 1960s some members of the scientific community began to express their concerns. In the early 1970s, there were large protests about the proposed nuclear power plant Wyhl, located at the Rhine in south west Germany. The project was cancelled in 1975 and anti-nuclear success at Wyhl inspired opposition to nuclear power in other parts of Europe and North America. Nuclear power became an issue of major public protest in the 1970s.

== Uranium mining and milling ==
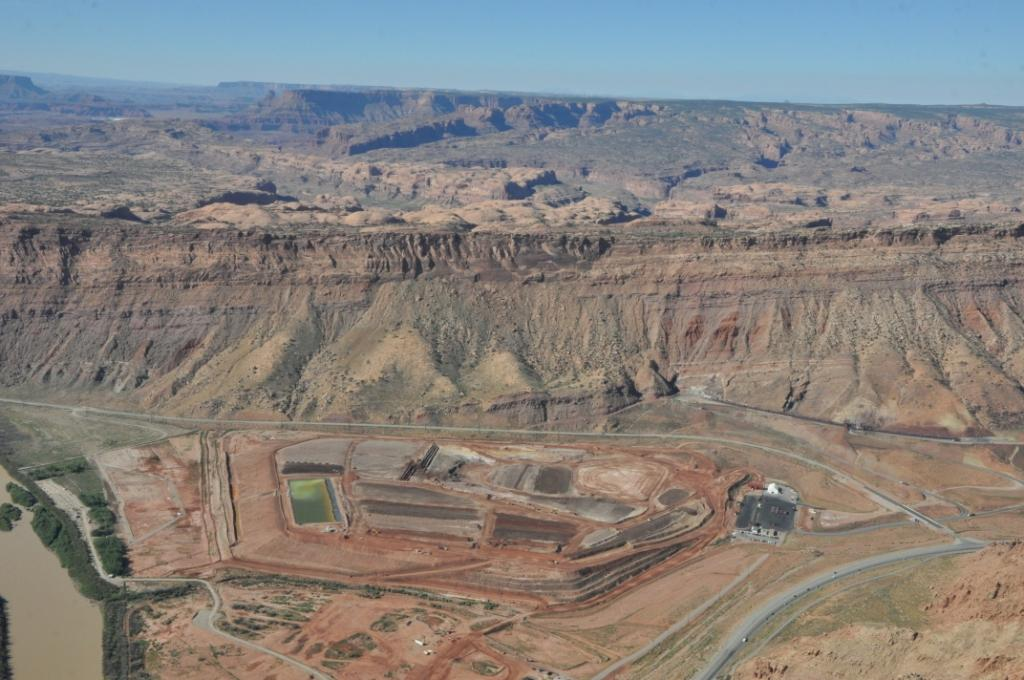
Moab uranium mill tailings pile

Between 1949 and 1989, over 4,000 uranium mines in the Four Corner region of the American Southwest produced more than 225,000,000 tons of uranium ore. This activity affected a large number of Native American nations, including the Laguna, Navajo, Zuni, Southern Ute, Ute Mountain, Hopi, Acoma and other Pueblo cultures. Many of these peoples worked in the mines, mills and processing plants in New Mexico, Arizona, Utah and Colorado. These workers were not only poorly paid, they were seldom informed of dangers nor were they given appropriate protective gear. The government, mine owners, scientific, and health communities were all well aware of the hazards of working with radioactive materials at this time. Due to the Cold War demand for increasingly destructive and powerful nuclear weapons, these laborers were both exposed to and brought home large amounts of radiation in the form of dust on their clothing and skin. Epidemiologic studies of the families of these workers have shown increased incidents of radiation-induced cancers, miscarriages, cleft palates and other birth defects. The extent of these genetic effects on indigenous populations and the extent of DNA damage remains to be resolved. Uranium mining on the Navajo reservation continues to be a disputed issue as former Navajo mine workers and their families continue to suffer from health problems.

== Notable nuclear weapons accidents ==
- 13 February 1950: a Convair B-36B crashed in northern British Columbia after jettisoning a Mark IV atomic bomb. This was the first such nuclear weapon loss in history.
- 22 May 1957: a 42,000-pound Mark-17 hydrogen bomb accidentally fell from a bomber near Albuquerque, New Mexico. The detonation of the device's conventional explosives destroyed it on impact and formed a crater 25-feet in diameter on land owned by the University of New Mexico. According to a researcher at the Natural Resources Defense Council, it was one of the most powerful bombs made to date.
- 7 June 1960: the 1960 Fort Dix IM-99 accident destroyed a Boeing CIM-10 Bomarc nuclear missile and shelter and contaminated the BOMARC Missile Accident Site in New Jersey.
- 24 January 1961: the 1961 Goldsboro B-52 crash occurred near Goldsboro, North Carolina. A B-52 Stratofortress carrying two Mark 39 nuclear bombs broke up in mid-air, dropping its nuclear payload in the process.
- 1965 Philippine Sea A-4 crash, where a Skyhawk attack aircraft with a nuclear weapon fell into the sea. The pilot, the aircraft, and the B43 nuclear bomb were never recovered. It was not until the 1980s that the Pentagon revealed the loss of the one-megaton bomb.
- 17 January 1966: the 1966 Palomares B-52 crash occurred when a B-52G bomber of the USAF collided with a KC-135 tanker during mid-air refuelling off the coast of Spain. The KC-135 was completely destroyed when its fuel load ignited, killing all four crew members. The B-52G broke apart, killing three of the seven crew members aboard. Of the four Mk28 type hydrogen bombs the B-52G carried, three were found on land near Almería, Spain. The non-nuclear explosives in two of the weapons detonated upon impact with the ground, resulting in the contamination of a 2-square-kilometer (490-acre) (0.78 square mile) area by radioactive plutonium. The fourth, which fell into the Mediterranean Sea, was recovered intact after a 2½-month-long search.
- 21 January 1968: the 1968 Thule Air Base B-52 crash involved a United States Air Force (USAF) B-52 bomber. The aircraft was carrying four hydrogen bombs when a cabin fire forced the crew to abandon the aircraft. Six crew members ejected safely, but one who did not have an ejection seat was killed while trying to bail out. The bomber crashed onto sea ice in Greenland, causing the nuclear payload to rupture and disperse, which resulted in widespread radioactive contamination.
- 18–19 September 1980: the Damascus Accident, occurred in Damascus, Arkansas, where a Titan missile equipped with a nuclear warhead exploded. The accident was caused by a maintenance man who dropped a socket from a socket wrench down an 80-foot shaft, puncturing a fuel tank on the rocket. Leaking fuel resulted in a hypergolic fuel explosion, jettisoning the W-53 warhead beyond the launch site.

== Nuclear fallout ==
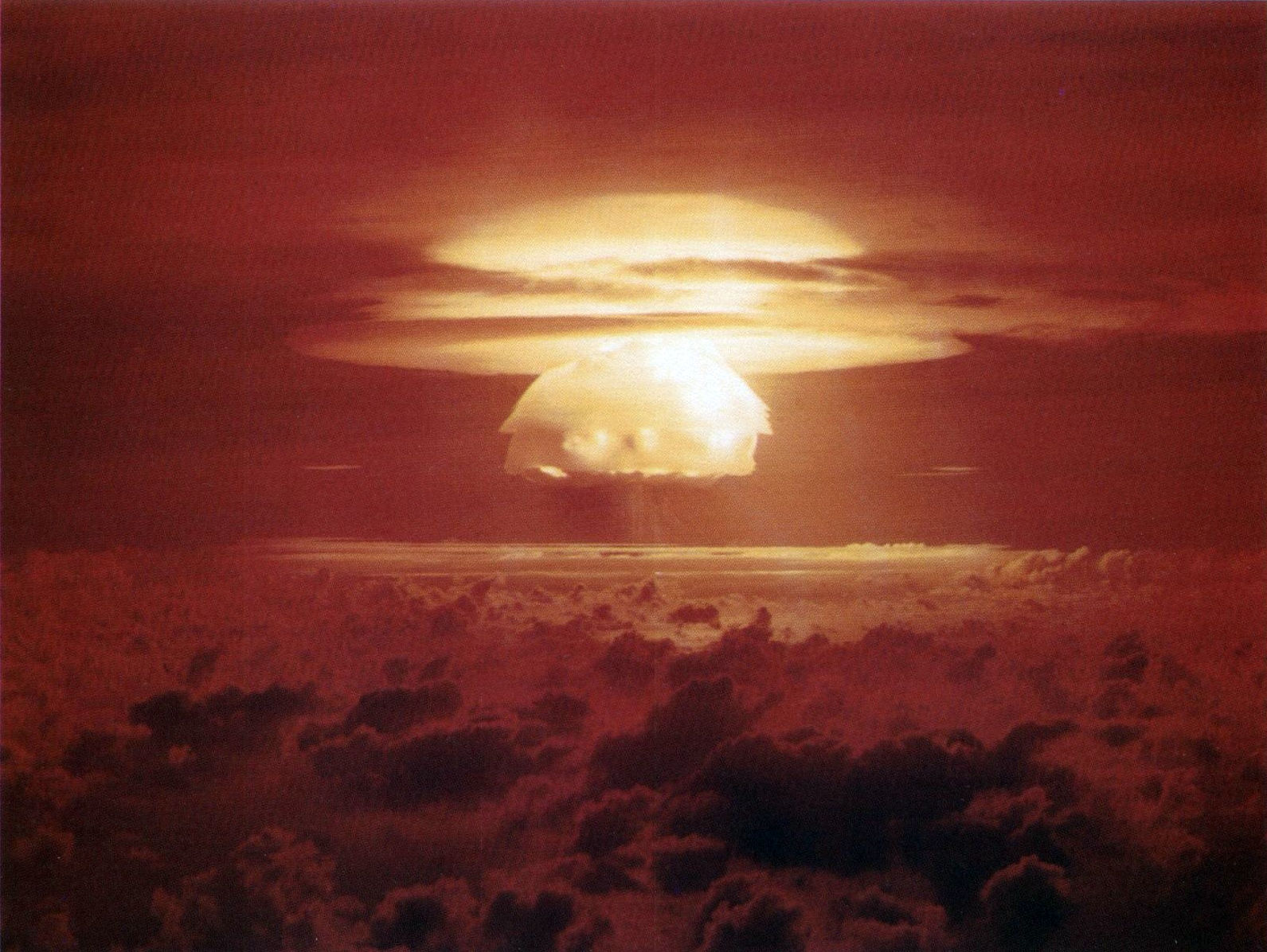
Castle Bravo Blast

Over 500 atmospheric nuclear weapons tests were conducted at various sites around the world from 1945 to 1980. Radioactive fallout from nuclear weapons testing was first drawn to public attention in 1954 when the Castle Bravo hydrogen bomb test at the Pacific Proving Grounds contaminated the crew and catch of the Japanese fishing boat Lucky Dragon. One of the fishermen died in Japan seven months later, and the fear of contaminated tuna led to a temporary boycotting of the popular staple in Japan. The incident caused widespread concern around the world, especially regarding the effects of nuclear fallout and atmospheric nuclear testing, and "provided a decisive impetus for the emergence of the anti-nuclear weapons movement in many countries".

As public awareness and concern mounted over the possible health hazards associated with exposure to the nuclear fallout, various studies were done to assess the extent of the hazard. A Centers for Disease Control and Prevention/ National Cancer Institute study claims that fallout from atmospheric nuclear tests would lead to perhaps 11,000 excess deaths amongst people alive during atmospheric testing in the United States from all forms of cancer, including leukemia, from 1951 to well into the 21st century. As of March 2009, the U.S. is the only nation that compensates nuclear test victims. Since the Radiation Exposure Compensation Act of 1990, more than $1.38 billion in compensation has been approved. The money is going to people who took part in the tests, notably at the Nevada Test Site, and to others exposed to the radiation.

== Nuclear labor issues ==
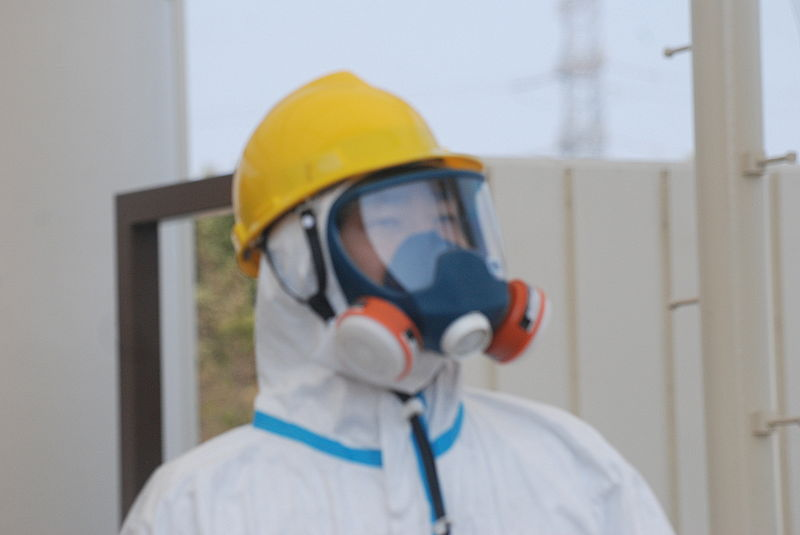
VOA Herman – 13 April 2011 Fukushima Nuclear Power Plant-04

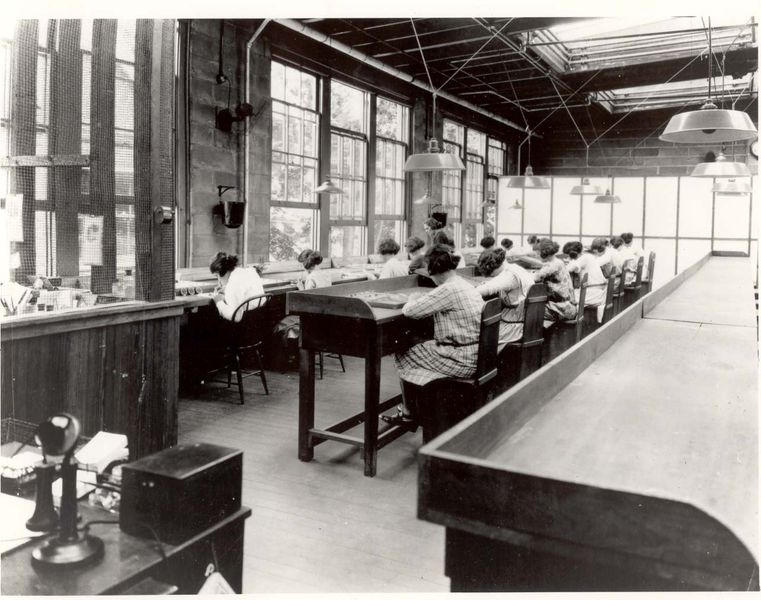
USRadiumGirls-Argonne

Nuclear labor issues exist within the nuclear power industry and the nuclear weapons production sector that impact upon the lives and health of laborers, itinerant workers and their families. This subculture of frequently undocumented workers (e.g., Radium Girls, the Fukushima 50, Liquidators, and Nuclear Samurai) do the dirty, difficult, and potentially dangerous work shunned by regular employees. When they exceed their allowable radiation exposure limit at a specific facility, they often migrate to a different nuclear facility. The industry implicitly accepts this conduct as it can not operate without these practices.

Existent labor laws protecting worker's health rights are not properly enforced. Records are required to be kept, but frequently they are not. Some personnel were not properly trained resulting in their own exposure to toxic amounts of radiation. At several facilities there are ongoing failures to perform required radiological screenings or to implement corrective actions.

Many questions regarding these nuclear worker conditions go unanswered, and with the exception of a few whistleblowers, the vast majority of laborers – unseen, underpaid, overworked and exploited, have few incentives to share their stories. The median annual wage for hazardous radioactive materials removal workers, according to the U.S. Bureau of Labor Statistics is $37,590 in the U.S – $18 per hour. A 15-country collaborative cohort study of cancer risks due to exposure to low-dose ionizing radiation, involving 407,391 nuclear industry workers, showed significant increase in cancer mortality. The study evaluated 31 types of cancers, primary and secondary.

== Civil liberties ==
Nuclear power is a potential target for terrorists, such as ISIL, and also increases the chances of nuclear weapons proliferation. Circumventing those problems involves reducing civil liberties, such as freedom of speech and of assembly, and so social scientist Brian Martin says that "nuclear power is not a suitable power source for a free society".

== Human radiation experiments ==
The Advisory Committee on Human Radiation Experiments (ACHRE) was formed on 15 January 1994, by President Bill Clinton. Hazel O'Leary, the Secretary of Energy at the U.S. Department of Energy called for a policy of "new openness", initiating the release of over 1.6 million pages of classified documents. These records revealed that since the 1940s, the Atomic Energy Commission was conducting widespread testing on human beings without their consent. Children, pregnant women, as well as male prisoners were injected with or orally consumed radioactive materials.

== See also ==
- Democratic peace theory
- Nuclear power debate
