= YTM =

YTM means yield to maturity.

YTM may also refer to:

- A US Navy hull classification symbol: Medium harbor tug (YTM)
- YTM, the International Air Transport Association airport code for Rivière Rouge – Mont Tremblant International Airport, Canada
- YouTube Music
