= 35th Bombardment Squadron =

35th Bombardment Squadron (later 35th Tactical Missile Squadron)
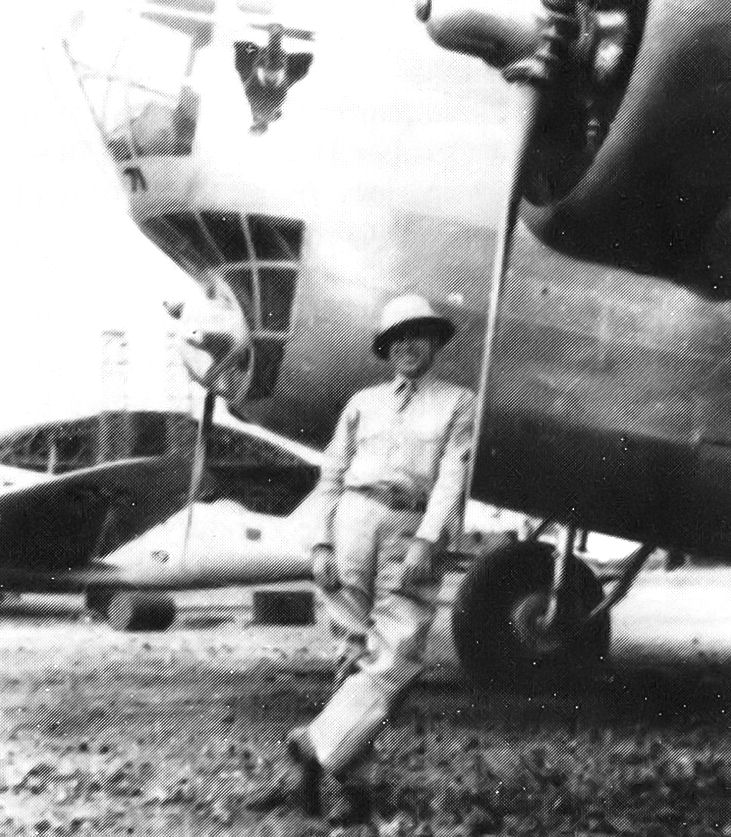
- 35th Squadron Douglas B-18 Bolo with unofficial squadron emblem, Coolidge Field, Antigua, 1941
- Active: 1940–1944; 1947–1949; 1960–1969––
- Country: United States
- Branch: United States Air Force
- Role: Medium bomber
- Engagements: American Theater Antisubmarine Campaign

Insignia
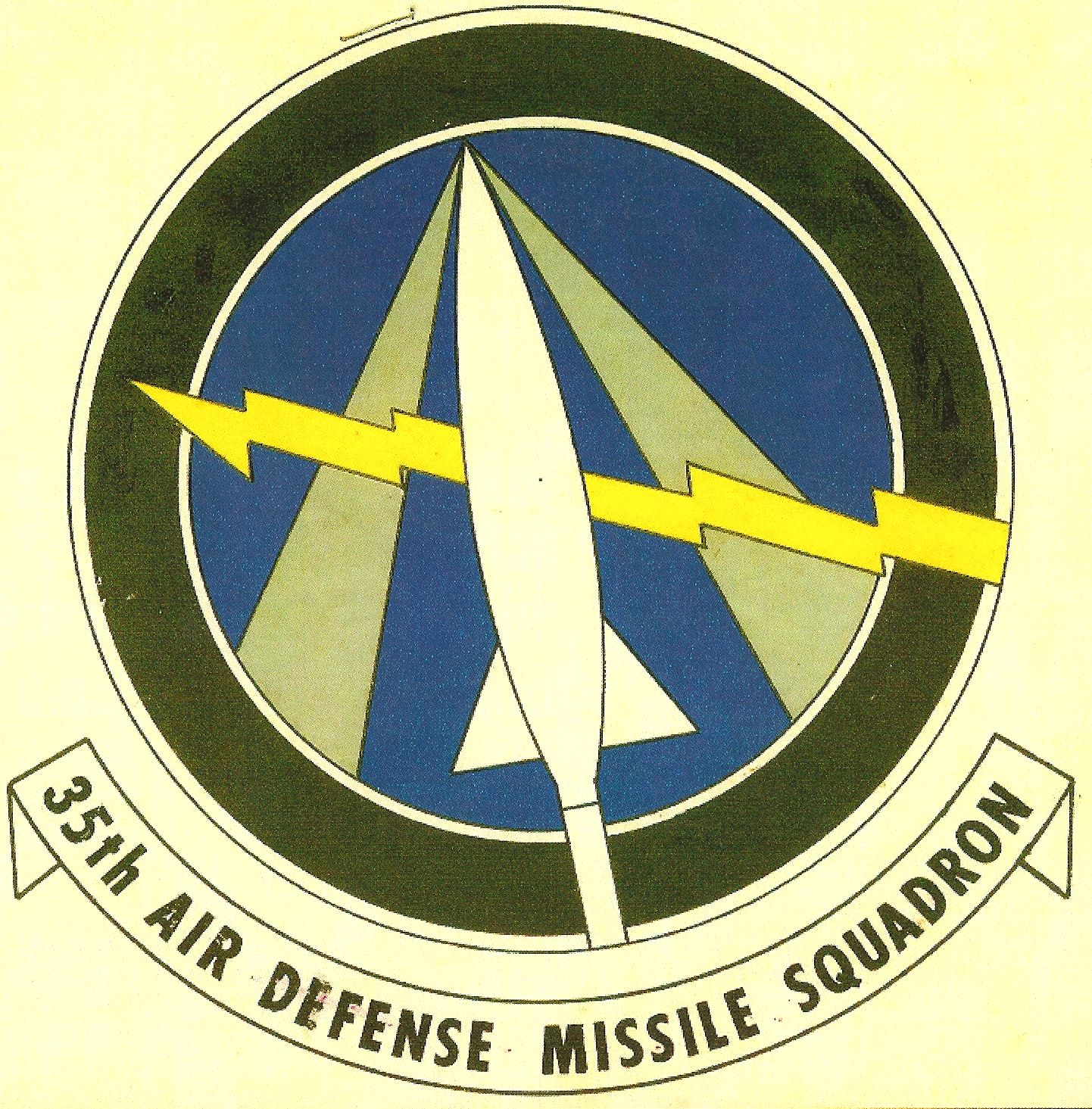
- 35th Air Defense Missile Squadron emblem (Note: Approved 23 April 1963. Description: On an Air Force blue disc edged white within a wide black border edged white, two silver-gray rays throughout issuing from dexter base and sinister base respectively, and converging to dexter chief surmounted by an Air Force golden yellow lightning bolt fesswise issuing from the outer perimeter of the border in sinister; over all between the two rays a missile in upward bendwise flight emitting exhaust to outer perimeter of the border in base, all white. Significance: The emblem signifies power to preserve the peace. Against a background of deep blue (to indicate the sky which is guarded by the organization), two gray streaks (indicating twilight which divides the daylight and the darkness), and a lightning bolt (representing the power of the weapon) are surmounted by a missile streaking across the emblem to represent this unit's primary purpose. The white color symbolizes the purity of peace. The black border prophesies doom to those who would breach the peace.)

The 35th Bombardment Squadron is an inactive United States Air Force unit. It was activated in January 1940 as the United States built up its armed forces prior to World War II. In the fall of 1941, it deployed to the Caribbean and, following the attack on Pearl Harbor engaged in antisubmarine patrols. Following the transfer of the land based antisubmarine mission to the Navy, and with the lessening of threats to the Panama Canal, the squadron returned to the United States, where it was disbanded in June 1944.

The squadron was reconstituted in 1947 and activated in the reserve, but it does not appear to have been fully manned or equipped before inactivating in 1949. In 1985, the squadron was consolidated with the 35th Air Defense Missile Squadron, which had provided air defense of the Northeastern United States from its base in northern New York from 1960 to 1969. The consolidated squadron was designated the 35th Tactical Missile Squadron, but has not been active since consolidation.

== History ==
=== World War II ===
The 35th Bombardment Squadron was first organized at Langley Field, Virginia in January 1940 as one of the three original squadrons of the 25th Bombardment Group. Although activated at Langley and training there, the activation orders anticipated that the squadron was to be stationed at Borinquen Field, Puerto Rico. The squadron began to equip with Douglas B-18 Bolos in 1941. (Note: The squadron probably flew Northrop A-17s for training while waiting for its B-18s. See Maurer, Combat Groups, p. 75 (25th Group aircraft).)

The squadron deployed to the Caribbean as part of the 1940 Destroyers for Bases Agreement with the British, departing Langley Field, on 26 October 1940, and was assigned to Coolidge Field, Antigua in the British West Indies (by way of Borinquen Field, Puerto Rico) before the subsequent dispersal of its original personnel and equipment. It had been assigned as a subordinate element of the 25th Bombardment Group. In May 1942, the unit was re designated as the 35th Bombardment Squadron (Medium).

On 31 October 1942, the first of the confusing reassignments that have tainted the overall picture of USAAF activities in the Caribbean was instituted. At that time, the squadron inherited the personnel and equipment of the 430th Bombardment Squadron (which had formerly been the 44th Reconnaissance Squadron). Additionally, the unit also got the personnel and equipment of the 99th Bombardment Squadron which had been based at Zandery Field, Surinam. Its personnel at Zandery becoming "A" and "B" Flight of the squadron, while the former 430th BS personnel and equipment became "C" and "D" Flights.

In January 1943, the Squadron Headquarters was moved from Coolidge Field back to Borinquen Field, Puerto Rico. "B" and "D" Flights of the 417th Bombardment Squadron (Medium) were reassigned to the squadron on 1 May 1943. In addition, for short periods in January, March, July and August 1943, while the German submarine warfare campaign was most critical, aircraft of the 80th Bombardment Squadron, 10th Bombardment Squadron, 8th Antisubmarine Squadron, 9th Antisubmarine Squadron and the Navy VB 130 were attached and/or operated intermingled with 35th BS aircraft. Additionally, during August 1943, aircraft and crews of the 23d Antisubmarine Squadron were attached to the 35th.

These reactions to the German threat were brought about, mainly between 19 and 30 July 1943, by new and very bold tactics being displayed by the Axis U-boats, now intent on fighting it out with patrolling aircraft on the surface. All of this makes it clear that the 35th BS was a prime element in the Allied anti-submarine campaign in the Caribbean. This realization was brought home on 1 August 1943 when operational and administrative control of the Squadron and its several detachments was transferred from the 25th Bombardment Group to Antilles Air Command.

By 31 December 1943 the Navy had taken over the antisubmarine mission and the far-flung detachments were inactivated. By this time, the unit was little more than an Operational Training Unit. Although the Squadron was reassigned to Waller Field, Trinidad, nominally, on 7 February 1944, as of 24 March this largely administrative transfer was ended and the Squadron was returned home to the United States. where the designation became that of a B-25 Mitchell Operational Training Unit at Alamogordo Army Air Field, New Mexico

The squadron was disbanded on 20 June 1944.

=== Air Force reserve ===
Was activated as an Air Force Reserve squadron in July 1947 at Phillips Field, Maryland. May have operated some B-25s, although that is undetermined. Inactivated due to budget restraints in June 1949.

=== Cold War air defense ===
The 35th Air Defense Missile Squadron was activated on 1 June 1960 at Niagara Falls Air Force Missile Site, New York and assigned to Syracuse Air Defense Sector of Air Defense Command. The squadron was equipped with IM-99B Bomarc surface to air missiles and became fully operational in December 1961. The squadron's missiles were tied into the Semi-Automatic Ground Environment (SAGE) network. The squadron maintained its missiles on alert until 1 December 1969, and was inactivated at the end of December 1969.

The two squadrons were consolidated in September 1985 as the 35th Tactical Missile Squadron.

== Lineage ==
35th Bombardment Squadron

- Constituted as the 35th Bombardment Squadron (Heavy) on 22 December 1939

Activated on 1 February 1940
Redesignated 35th Bombardment Squadron (Medium) on 7 May 1942
Disbanded on 20 June 1944

- Reconstituted and redesignated 35th Bombardment Squadron, Light on 26 May 1947

Activated in the reserve on 13 July 1947
Inactivated on 27 June 1949
Consolidated with the 35th Air Defense Missile Squadron as the 35th Tactical Missile Squadron on 19 September 1985

35th Air Defense Missile Squadron

- Constituted as the 35th Air Defense Missile Squadron (BOMARC) on 17 December 1959

Activated on 1 June 1960
Inactivated on 31 December 1969
Consolidated with the 35th Bombardment Squadron as the 35th Tactical Missile Squadron on 19 September 1985

=== Assignments ===
- 25th Bombardment Group, 1 February 1940 – 20 June 1944
- Eleventh Air Force, (Note: This was a short-lived regional organization and is not related to Eleventh Air Force.) 13 July 1947
- 322d Bombardment Group, 30 September 1947 – 27 June 1949
- Syracuse Air Defense Sector, 1 June 1960
- Detroit Air Defense Sector, 4 September 1963
- 34th Air Division, 1 April 1966
- 35th Air Division, 15 September–31 December 1969

=== Stations ===
- Langley Field, Virginia, February–26 October 1940
- Borrinquen Field Puerto Rico, 31 October 1941
- Coolidge Field, Antigua, 11 November 1941
- Zandery Field, Surinam, 1 November 1942

Detachment operated from Atkinson Field, British Guiana, 1 November 1942–c. 7 October 1943
Detachment operated from Waller Field, Trinidad, 27 August–12 October 1943

- Vernam Field, Jamaica, c. 7 October 1943
- Waller Field, Trinidad, 7 February–24 March 1944
- Alamogordo Army Air Field, New Mexico, April–20 June 1944
- Phillips Field, Maryland, 13 July 1947 – 27 June 1949
- Niagara Falls Air Force Missile Site, New York, 1 June 1960 – 31 December 1969

=== Aircraft and missiles ===
- probably Northrop A-17, 1940
- Douglas B-18 Bolo, 1941–1943
- B-25 Mitchell, 1943–1944
- Boeing IM-99 (later CIM-10) BOMARC, 1960–1969
