= Syracuse Air Defense Sector =

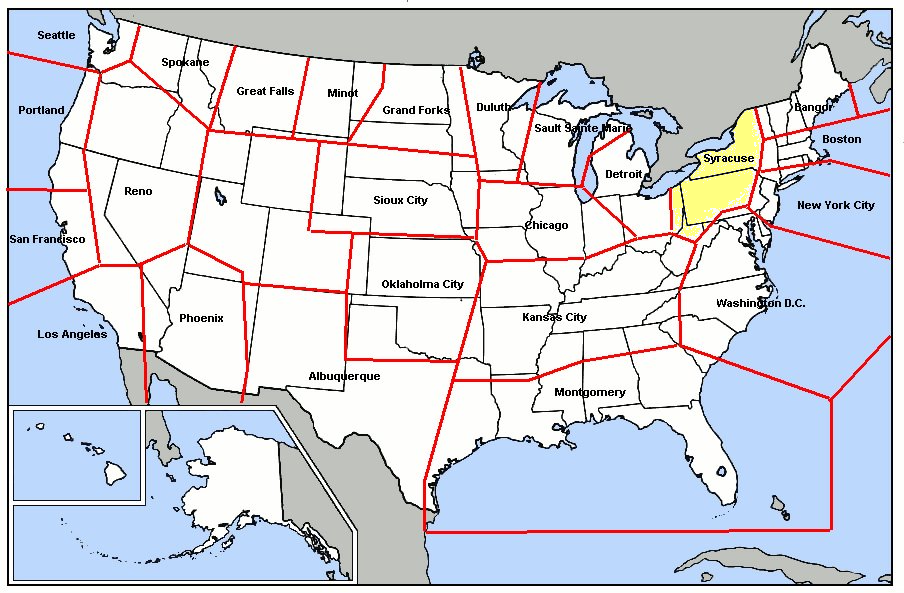
- Syracuse Air Defense Sector Area of Responsibility
- Active: 1956–1963
- Country: United States
- Branch: United States Air Force
- Role: Air defense

Insignia
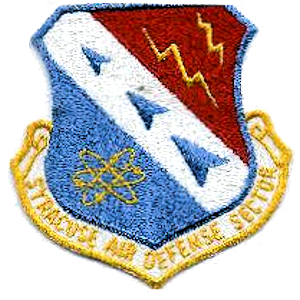
- Syracuse Air Defense Sector emblem (Note: Approved 20 April 1960. Description: Per bend Gules and Azure, on a bend Argent three flight symbols of the second [color mentioned] between in chief two lightning flashes and in base an atom symbol of three orbits, those fesswise and bend sinister positions bearing each two mullets Or, all within a diminished border of the third [color mentioned]. Significance: The emblem is symbolic of the sector and its mission. The blue field of the shield represents the air space and its area of responsibility, and the red field represents combat and the airmen who stand alert and ready to go forth into battle. The blue flight symbols represent the weapons launched for the preservation of peace. The lightning bolts symbolize the capacity to gather and transmit information electronically throughout the airspace of the command, and the electronic symbol indicates the capacity to assimilate and resolve information by electronic means and to direct the weapons in the solution of the air battle. The emblem bears the Air Force colors, ultramarine blue and golden yellow, and the national colors, red, white, and blue.)

The Syracuse Air Defense Sector (SADS) is an inactive United States Air Force organization. Its last assignment was with the Air Defense Command (ADC) 26th Air Division at Hancock Field, New York.

SADS was established in October 1956 as the 4624th Air Defense Wing, SAGE at Syracuse Air Force Station (AFS), New York, assuming control of former ADC Eastern Air Defense Force units primarily in western New York, most of Pennsylvania and a small portion of western Maryland and eastern West Virginia. It controlled several aircraft and radar squadrons.

On 15 August 1958 the new Semi Automatic Ground Environment (SAGE) Direction Center (DC-03) and Combat Center (CC-01) became operational. 43°07′19″N 076°06′01″W DC-03 was equipped with dual AN/FSQ-7 Computers. The day-to-day operations of the command were to train and maintain tactical units flying jet interceptor aircraft (F-89 Scorpion, F-101 Voodoo, F-102 Delta Dagger) and operating radars and interceptor missiles (CIM-10 Bomarc)in a state of readiness with training missions and a series of exercises with Strategic Air Command and other units simulating interceptions of incoming enemy aircraft. In early 1958, Syracuse AFS was renamed Hancock Field.

The sector was inactivated on 4 September 1963 when the 26th Air Division headquarters moved to Hancock Field and the Syracuse Sector, in a realignment of sector boundaries, merged with the Boston Air Defense Sector.

== Lineage ==
- Designated as 4624th Air Defense Wing, SAGE and organized on 1 October 1956

Redesignated Syracuse Air Defense Sector on 8 January 1957
Inactivated on 4 September 1963

== Assignments ==
- 32nd Air Division, 1 October 1956
- 26th Air Division, 15 August 1958 – 4 September 1963

== Stations ==
- Syracuse AFS, (later Hancock Field) New York, 1 October 1956 – 4 September 1963

== Components ==
- 15th Fighter Group (Air Defense)

Niagara Falls Municipal Airport, New York, 1 September 1958 – 1 July 1960

- 49th Fighter-Interceptor Squadron

Griffiss Air Force Base, New York, 1 August 1959 – 4 September 1963

- 35th Air Defense Missile Squadron (BOMARC)

Niagara Falls Air Force Missile Site, New York, 1 June 1960 – 4 September 1963

=== Radar Squadrons ===
- 648th Aircraft Control & Warning Squadron (later 648th Radar Squadron (SAGE))

Benton AFS, Pennsylvania, 15 August 1958 – 4 September 1963

- 655th Aircraft Control & Warning Squadron (later 655th Radar Squadron (SAGE))

Watertown AFS, New York, 1 September 1958 – 4 September 1963

- 662nd Aircraft Control & Warning Squadron (later 662d Radar Squadron (SAGE))

Brookfield AFS, Ohio (moved to Oakdale Army Installation), Pennsylvania in July 1960, 15 June 1960 – 4 September 1963

- 763rd Aircraft Control & Warning Squadron (later 763d Radar Squadron (SAGE))

Lockport AFS, New York, 1 September 1958 – 4 September 1963

- 772nd Aircraft Control & Warning Squadron (later 772d Radar Squadron (SAGE))

Claysburg AFS, Pennsylvania, 15 August 1958 – 1 May 1961

== Weapons Systems ==
- F-89J, 1959-1959
- F-101B, 1959-1963
- F-102A, 1958-1960
- IM-99 (later CIM-10), 1960-1963

== See also ==
- List of USAF Aerospace Defense Command General Surveillance Radar Stations
- Aerospace Defense Command Fighter Squadrons
- List of United States Air Force aircraft control and warning squadrons
