= The Beau-Marks =

Canadian rock band

The Beau-Marks were a Canadian rock music group formed in 1958 in Montreal, Quebec. Their first release, the April 1959 single "Rockin' Blues" b/w "Moonlight Party", came out under the name The Del-Tones, but the group changed their name soon afterward in a nod to the Bomarc missile. Their breakthrough hit was "Clap Your Hands," which hit #1 in Canada and Australia, peaked at #45 on the US Billboard pop charts, and #40 on Cashbox. It reached #8 on the New Zealand Lever Hit parade. The tune was also released in French as "Frappe Tes Mains" and a Quebec version as "Tape des mains", lyrics by late Michel A. Lebel, as one of Rock n' Roll Queen Lucie Marotte's finale favorites. Their debut, ten-track full-length LP came out in 1960. They also appeared on American Bandstand and at a charity concert at Carnegie Hall soon afterwards. Two more albums followed before the group broke up in 1963; a 1968 reunion saw "Clap Your Hands" get a re-release which reached #74 on the RPM charts.

The Beau-Marks were the first Canadian band to be headliners at the Peppermint Lounge in New York City and to be invited to appear on The Ed Sullivan Show.

== Members ==
- Raymond "Ray" Hutchinson - guitar (Died early November, 2021 at age 81)
- Michel "Mike" Robitaille - guitar and bass
- Joseph "Joey" Fréchette - piano and vocals
- Gilles Tailleur - drums
- Phillip "Shakin" Baker - lead guitar and vocals (alt/back-up)

== Discography ==
- The High Flying Beau-Marks (1960)
- The Beau-Marks in Person! Recorded on Location at Le Coq D'Or (1961)
- The Beau-Marks (1962)
- Lucie Marotte (1990) - Tape des mains

=== CHUM Chart singles ===
- Clap Your Hands (1960) #33
- Billy, Billy Went A Walking (1960) #39
- Classmate (1961) #4
- Little Miss Twist / Lovely Little Lady (1961) #17
- The Tender Years (1962) #18
- Clap Your Hands Once Again (1962) mentioned and played on one episode of Roger Ashby Oldies Show

== See also ==
- Canadian rock
- Music of Canada
