= Otis Air Force Base BOMARC site =

- Part of Boston Air Defense Sector
- Otis Air Force Base, Sandwich, Massachusetts
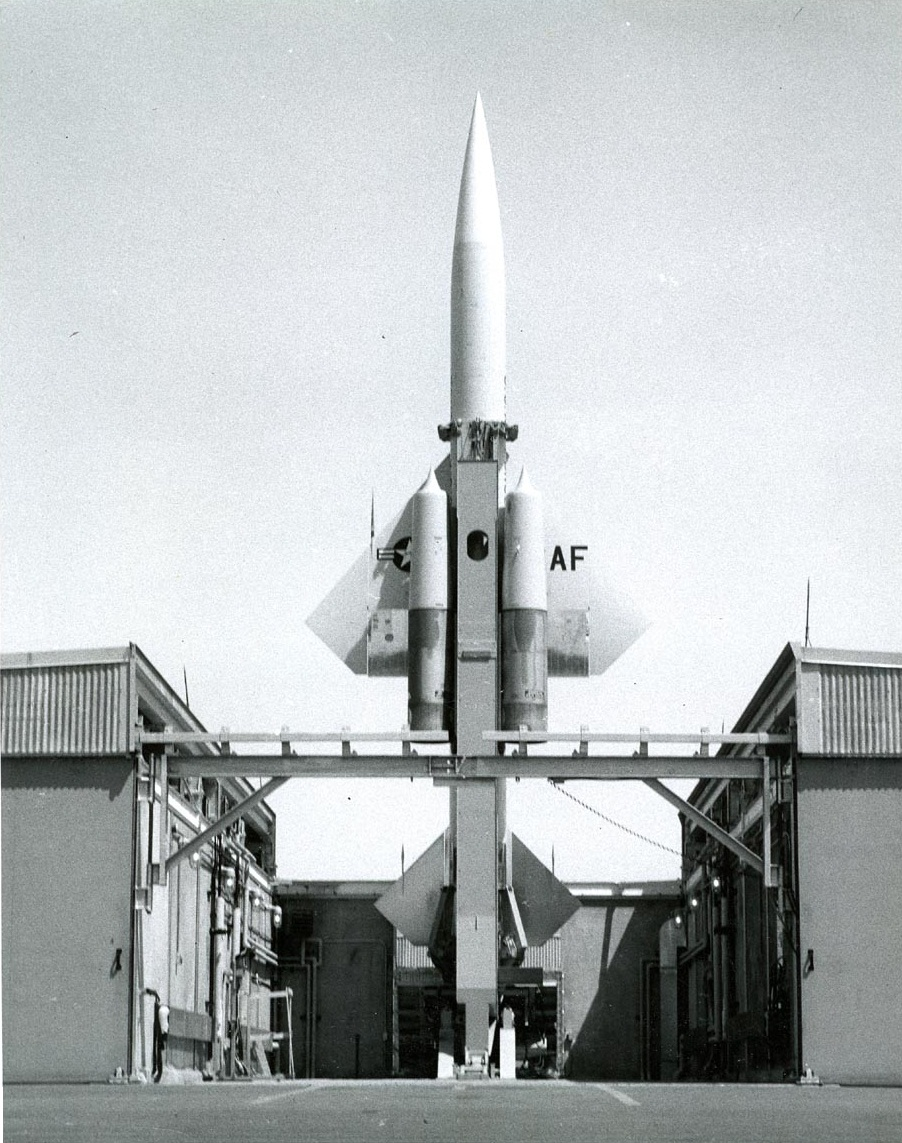
- BOMARC-B missile in the launch ready position at Otis

Site information
- Type: surface-to-air missile base
- Controlled by: 1959–1968: Air Defense Command; 1968–1972: Aerospace Defense Command

Location
- Coordinates: 41°40′54.65″N 70°32′15.87″W

Garrison information
- Garrison: 26th Air Defense Missile Squadron

The Otis Air Force Base BOMARC site was a Cold War USAF launch complex for Boeing CIM-10 Bomarc surface-to-air missiles. Equipped with IM-99Bs (56 missiles: 28 solid-state, 28 liquid-state), the site had 28 Model IV "coffin" shelters, on 60 acres (24 ha).

The site was run by the 26th Air Defense Missile Squadron, initially part of the Boston Air Defense Sector, 26th Air Division.
