= 4751st Air Defense Squadron =

4751st Air Defense Missile Squadron
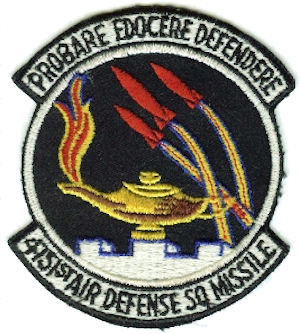
- 4751st Air Defense Missile Squadron – Emblem
- Active: 1958–1979
- Country: United States
- Branch: United States Air Force
- Role: Missile training

The 4751st Air Defense Missile Squadron is a discontinued United States Air Force unit. It was last active with Air Defense, Tactical Air Command (ADTAC), based at Eglin Air Force Base, Florida. It was inactivated on 30 September 1979.

== History ==
In September 1958 Air Research and Development Command decided to transfer the Bomarc long range surface-to-air missile program from its testing site at Cape Canaveral Air Force Station to a new facility on Santa Rosa Island, immediately south of Eglin AFB on the Gulf of Mexico. At Eglin, an Operational Testing facility and Operational Training Unit would be created under the jurisdiction of Air Defense Command, under which operational Bomarc units would be established and supported.

To operate the facility and to provide training and operational evaluation in the missile program, ADC established the 4751st Air Defense Wing (Missile) (4751st ADW) on 15 January 1958. The first launch from Santa Rosa took place on 15 January 1959.

The training program used technicians acting as instructors and was established for a four-month duration. Training included missile maintenance; SAGE operations and launch procedures, including the launch of an unarmed missile at Eglin.

The last Bomarc missile squadron inactivated on 31 October 1972. The squadron was inactivated on 30 September 1979.

The Bomarc site is located on Santa Rosa Island is at 30°23′16″N 086°48′28″W

=== Lineage ===
- Established 4751st Air Defense Missile Squadron and activated, 15 January 1959

Re-designated 4751st Air Defense Squadron (Missile) on 1 April 1960
Inactivated 30 September 1979

=== Assignments ===
- 73d Air Division (Weapons), 15 January 1959
- 32d Air Division, 1 October 1959
- Montgomery Air Defense Sector, 1 July 1962
- Air Defense, Tactical Air Command, 1–30 September 1979

=== Stations ===
- Eglin Air Force Base, Florida, 15 January 1959 – 30 September 1979

=== Missiles ===
- CIM-10 Bomarc
