= 26th Air Defense Missile Squadron =

26th Air Defense Missile Squadron later 26th Tactical Missile Squadron
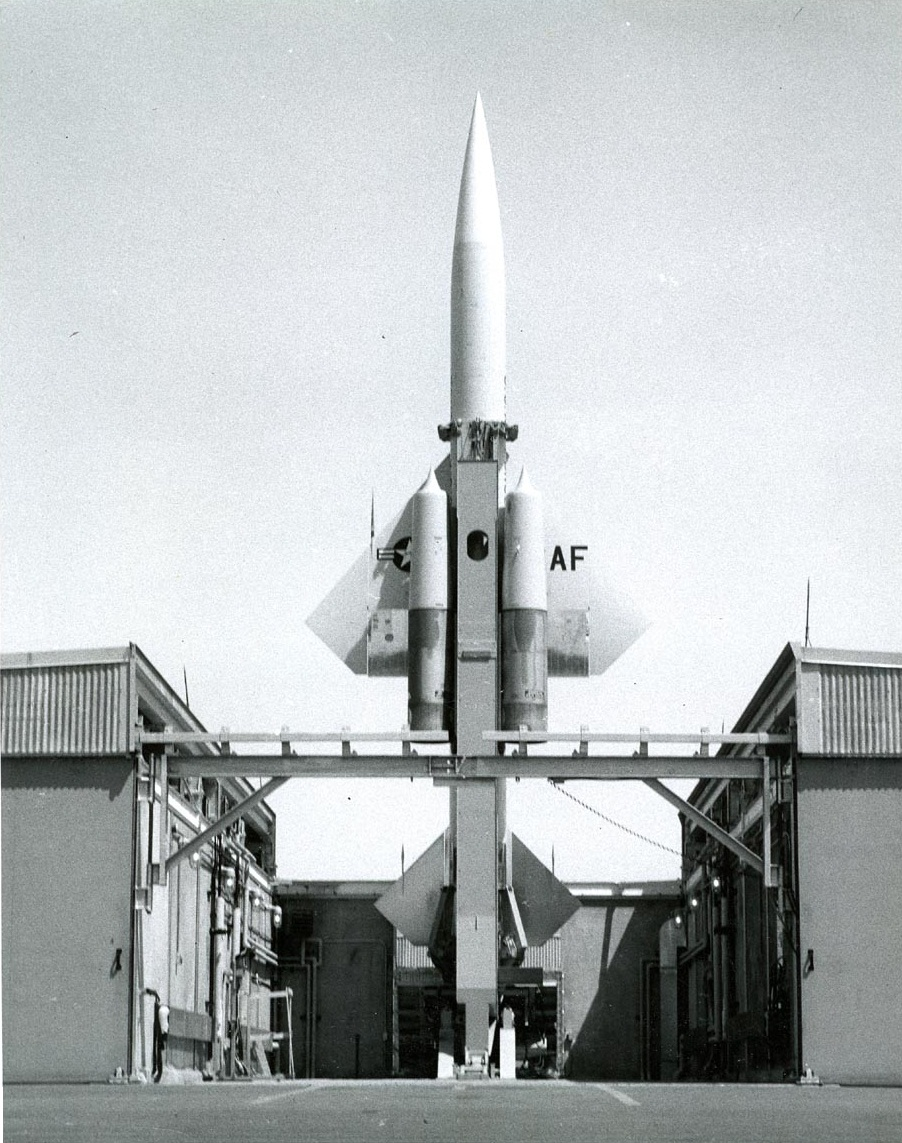
- Bomarc missile at Otis AFB
- Active: 1942-1943, 1959-1972
- Country: United States
- Branch: United States Air Force
- Role: Air defense
- Size: Squadron
- Motto: Vigilant Defender (1960-1972)
- Equipment: CIM-10 Bomarc
- Decorations: Air Force Outstanding Unit Award

Insignia
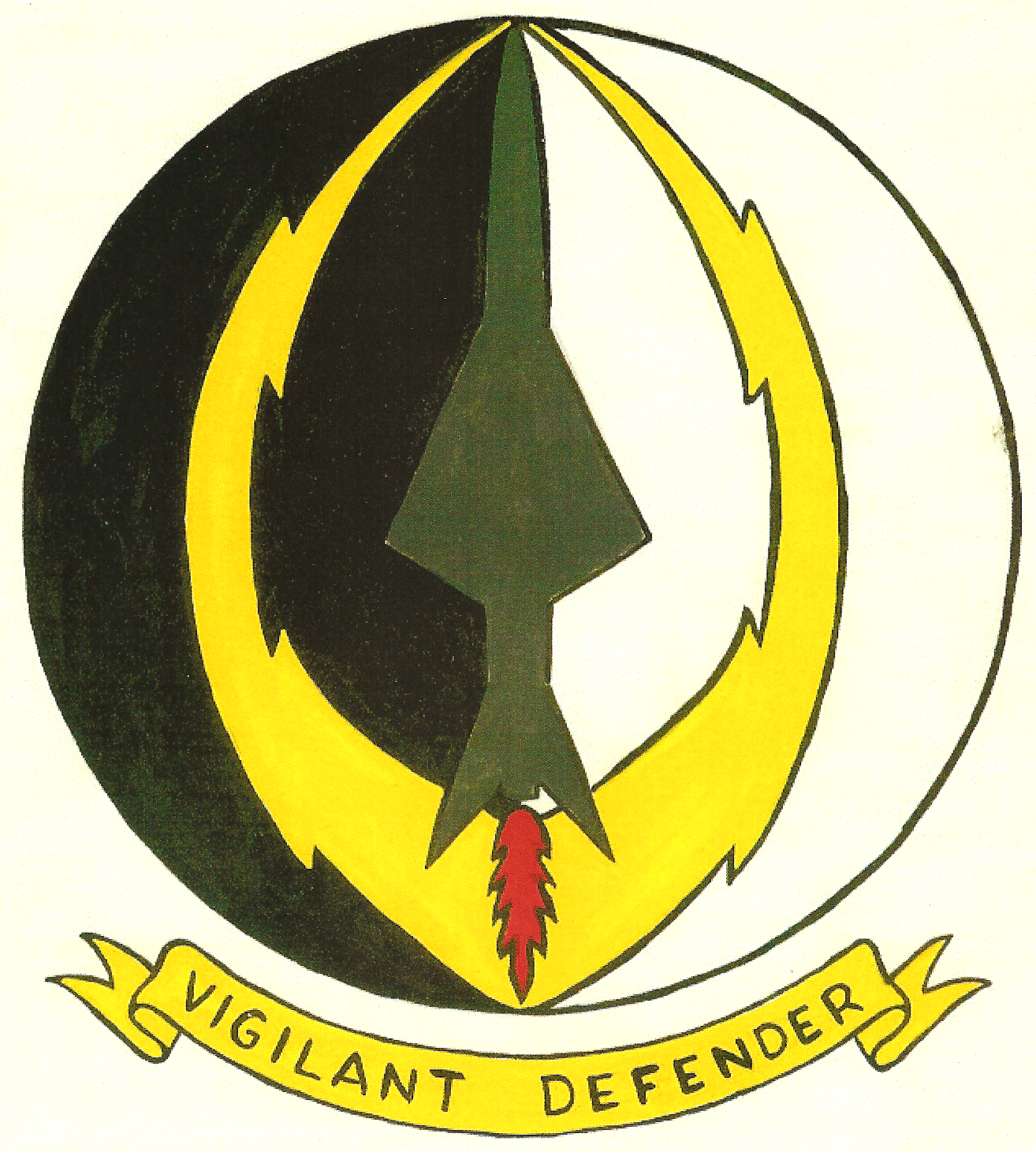
- 26th Air Defense Missile Squadron emblem (Note: Approved 27 October 1960. Description: On a disc per pale Air Force blue spattered with white stars, and white; two Air Force golden yellow lightning flashes conjoined in base and arched to middle chief point, one in dexter, one in sinister; over all in pale throughout a silver-gray missile, highlighted white, in flight to chief leaving red exhaust to base; outlines and details Air Force blue throughout. On a white scroll edged and inscribed Air Force blue, [the motto]. Significance: Over a background of deep blue, spattered with stars, and white to represent the night and day sky or 24-hour operations, two lightning bolts are displayed, one against the night sky, one against the day sky to indicate the unit's operational ability to intercept around the clock. The missile provides the center of interest in the design to indicate this is a missile squadron.)

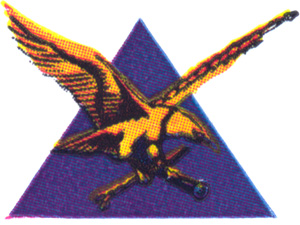
- 26th Tactical Reconnaissance Squadron emblem (Note: Approved 20 May 1943. Description: Over and through a blue triangle, a gold hawk, shaded black, in flight, grasping a machine gun black in dexter claw and a telescope black in sinister claw.)

The 26th Air Defense Missile Squadron is an inactive United States Air Force unit. It was activated in 1959 as the 26th Air Defense Missile Squadron to provide missile air defense for New England and was stationed at Otis Air Force Base, Massachusetts, where it was inactivated on 30 April 1972. It received its current name in 1985. when it was consolidated with the 26th Tactical Reconnaissance Squadron, a World War II unit that provided reconnaissance support for ground units in training until it was disbanded in 1943.

== History ==
=== World War II ===
The first predecessor of the squadron was activated at Gray Field, Washington in March 1942 as the 26th Observation Squadron and assigned to the 70th Observation Group. It was initially equipped with North American O-47s. The squadron participated in maneuvers and provided reconnaissance support for Army ground forces training in the Pacific coast region. Until September 1942, the squadron also flew antisubmarine patrols off the coast.

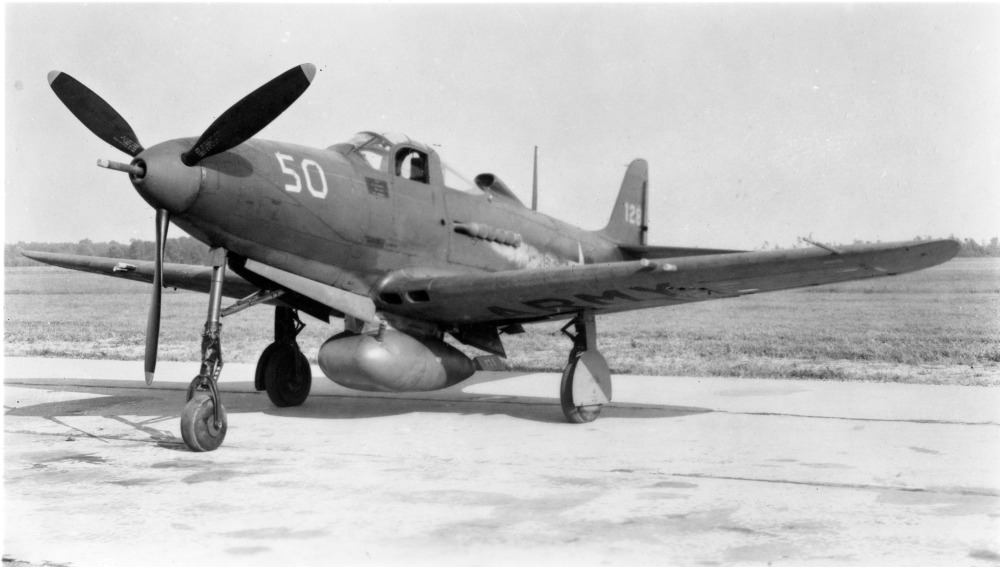
Bell P-39D

In 1943, the squadron began to fly Bell P-39 Airacobras, becoming the 26th Reconnaissance Squadron (Fighter). With these aircraft it added fighter support to its training mission. In the spring of 1943, it moved with the 70th Group to Salinas Army Air Base, California. It became the 26th Tactical Reconnaissance Squadron in August, but continued its mission from Pacific bases until moving to Will Rogers Field, Oklahoma in November 1943, where it was disbanded.

=== Air defense of New England ===
The 26th Air Defense Missile Squadron was activated at Otis Air Force Base on 1 March 1959 and became operational with IM-99A (later CIM-10) BOMARC surface to air antiaircraft missiles. It stood alert during the Cold War. In September 1962, it upgraded to the IM-99B. The squadron was tied into a Semi-Automatic Ground Environment (SAGE) direction center which used digital computers to process information from ground radars, picket ships and airborne aircraft to accelerate the display of tracking data at the direction center to quickly direct the missile site to engage hostile aircraft. It became non operational on 1 April 1972 and was inactivated on 30 April 1972.

The BOMARC missile site was located 1 mile (1.6 km) north-northwest of Otis AFB at 41°40′56″N 070°32′21″W. Although located outside of the base (but within the borders of the Massachusetts Military Reservation, it was treated as an off base facility and the squadron received administrative and logistical support from Otis.

In 1985, the squadron was consolidated with the 26th Tactical Reconnaissance Squadron, but has never been active with this designation.

== Lineage ==
26th Tactical Reconnaissance Squadron

- Constituted as the 26th Observation Squadron (Light) on 5 February 1942

Activated on 2 March 1942
Redesignated 26th Observation Squadron on 4 July 1942
Redesignated 26th Reconnaissance Squadron (Fighter) on 2 April 1943
Redesignated 26th Tactical Reconnaissance Squadron on 11 August 1943
Disbanded on 30 November 1943

- Reconstituted on 19 September 1985 and consolidated with the 26th Air Defense Missile Squadron as the 26th Tactical Missile Squadron

26th Air Defense Missile Squadron

- Constituted as the 26th Air Defense Missile Squadron on 23 January 1959

Activated on 1 March 1959
Inactivated on 30 April 1972

- Consolidated with the 26th Tactical Reconnaissance Squadron as the 26th Tactical Missile Squadron on 19 September 1985

=== Assignments ===
- 70th Observation Group (later 70th Reconnaissance Group, 70th Tactical Reconnaissance Group), 2 March 1942 – 30 November 1943
- Boston Air Defense Sector, 1 March 1959
- 35th Air Division, 1 April 1966
- 21st Air Division, 19 November 1969 – 30 April 1972

=== Stations ===
- Gray Field, Washington, 2 March 1942
- Salinas Army Air Base, California, 15 March 1943
- Redmond Army Air Field, Oregon, 16 August 1943
- Corvallis Army Air Field, Oregon, 31 October 1943
- Will Rogers Field, Oklahoma, 14–30 November 1943
- Otis Air Force Base, Massachusetts, 1 March 1959 – 30 April 1972

=== Awards ===
Award streamer	Award	Dates	Notes
	Air Force Outstanding Unit Award	1 January 1967 – 30 June 1968	26th Air Defense Missile Squadron
	Air Force Outstanding Unit Award	1 January 1970 – 30 June 1971	26th Air Defense Missile Squadron

Campaign Streamer	Campaign	Dates	Notes
	American Theater without inscription	2 March 1942 - 30 November 1943	26th Observation Squadron (later 26th Reconnaissance Squadron, 26th Tactical Reconnaissance Squadron)

=== Aircraft and missiles ===
- North American O-47, 1942-1943
- Bell P-39 Airacobra, 1943
- Boeing IM-99 (later CIM-10) BOMARC, 1959 -1972

== See also ==
- List of United States Air Force missile squadrons
