= Claysburg Air Force Station =

Closed United States Air Force General Surveillance Radar station

Claysburg Air Force Station
- Part of Air Defense Command (ADC)

Site information
- Type: Air Force Station
- Controlled by: United States Air Force

Location
- Location of Claysburg AFS, Pennsylvania
- Coordinates: 40°17′15″N 078°33′50″W

Site history
- Built: 1952
- In use: 1952-1961

Garrison information
- Garrison: 772d Aircraft Warning and Control Squadron

Claysburg Air Force Station (ADC ID: P-63) is a closed United States Air Force General Surveillance Radar station. It is located 6 miles (9.7 km) west of Claysburg, Pennsylvania. It was closed in 1961 due to budget constraints. The unit was eventually moved to Gibbsboro Air Force Station (RP-63), New Jersey.

== History ==
Claysburg Air Force Station was part of the last batch of twenty-three radar stations constructed as part of the Air Defense Command permanent network. It was activated in April 1952, replacing the Connelsville L-16 Lashup site. It was declared completely operational in late 1952.

The 772d Aircraft Control and Warning Squadron began operations with an AN/CPS-4 height-finder radar and AN/FPS-3 search radar, and initially the station functioned as a Ground-Control Intercept (GCI) and warning station. As a GCI station, the squadron's role was to guide interceptor aircraft toward unidentified intruders picked up on the unit's radar scopes. In 1956, an AN/FPS-4 replaced the AN/CPS-4 and two years later an AN/FPS-20 replaced the original AN/FPS-3 search radar.

During 1959 Claysburg AFS joined the Semi Automatic Ground Environment (SAGE) system, initially feeding data to DC-03 at Syracuse AFS, New York. After joining, the squadron was redesignated as the 772d Radar Squadron (SAGE) on 1 February 1959. The radar squadron provided information 24/7 the SAGE Direction Center where it was analyzed to determine range, direction altitude speed and whether or not aircraft were friendly or hostile.

This site was closed in 1961 and the 772d Radar Squadron was repositioned to an existing Army Nike Missile site at Pedricktown, NJ, which became Gibbsboro AFS, New Jersey in order to save money by combining Army and Air Force radar sites. Today Claysburg AFS has been redeveloped into Blue Knob Ski Resort.

== Air Force units and assignments ==
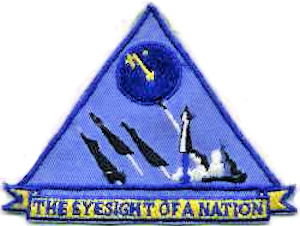
772d Aircraft Control and Warning Squadron Patch

=== Units ===
- Constituted as the 772d Aircraft Warning and Control Squadron on 14 November 1950

Activated at Connellsville, PA (L-16) on 27 November 1950
Moved to Blue Knob Park, PA on 1 December 1951
Blue Knob Park renamed Claysburg Air Force Station on 1 December 1953
Redesignated 772d Radar Squadron (SAGE) on 1 February 1959
Moved to Gibbsboro Air Force Station, NJ on 1 May 1961.

Assignments:

- 503d Aircraft Control and Warning Group, 1 January 1951
- 26th Air Division, 6 February 1952
- 4710th Defense Wing, 16 February 1953
- 4708th Air Defense Wing, 1 March 1956
- 30th Air Division, 8 July 1956
- Syracuse Air Defense Sector, 15 August 1958 – 1 May 1961

== See also ==
- List of USAF Aerospace Defense Command General Surveillance Radar Stations
