= Gibbsboro Air Force Station =

Gibbsboro Air Force Station
- Part of Air Defense Command (ADC)
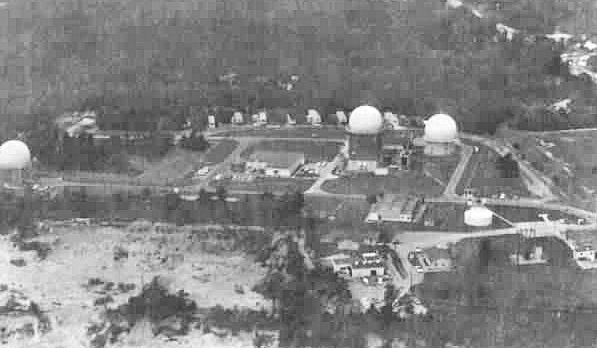
- 1979 USAF photo

Site information
- Type: Air Force Station
- Code: ADC ID: RP-63, NORAD ID: Z-63; JSS/GEF ID: J-51
- Controlled by: United States Air Force

Location
- Location of Gibbsboro AFS, New Jersey
- Coordinates: 39°49′27″N 74°57′16″W

Site history
- Built: 1961
- In use: 1961–1984

Garrison information
- Garrison: 772d Aircraft Control and Warning (later Radar) Squadron

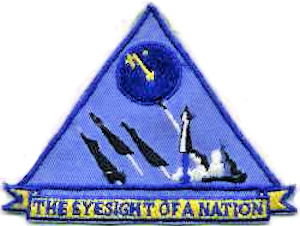
Emblem of the 772d Radar Squadron

Gibbsboro Air Force Station is a closed United States Air Force General Surveillance Radar station. It is located 1.1 miles (1.8 km) south-southeast of Gibbsboro, in Camden County, New Jersey, United States. It was closed in 1994 by the Air Force, and turned over to the Federal Aviation Administration (FAA).

Today the site is part of the Joint Surveillance System (JSS), designated by NORAD as Eastern Air Defense Sector (EADS) Ground Equipment Facility.

== History ==
What would eventually become Gibbsboro AFS was established in March 1957 as an unmanned "Gap Filler" site, designated P-9A for Highlands Air Force Station, New Jersey, configured with an AN/FPS-14 radar. It was the first Gap Filler site in the nation. In 1960, the United States Army established Army Air Defense Command Post (AADCP) PH-64DC for Nike missile command-and-control functions at Pedricktown Army Installation. The site was an AN/FSG-l Missile-Master Radar Direction Center.

In a fund-saving consolidation, the Air Force moved the 772d Radar Squadron (SAGE) from Claysburg Air Force Station, Pennsylvania, to this Army long-range radar site, and inactivated the P-9A gap-filler radar. The Army site was transferred to the Air Force, and renamed Gibbsboro Air Force Station. The site was redesignated as RP-53 and began Air Force long-range radar operations on 1 May 1961 with AN/FPS-66 and AN/FPS-6 radars. The center initially fed data to the SAGE (DC-01) center at McGuire AFB. The radar squadron provided information 24/7 the SAGE Direction Center where it was analyzed to determine range, direction altitude speed and whether or not aircraft were friendly or hostile.

On 31 July 1963, the site was redesignated as NORAD ID Z-63. In addition, an AN/FPS-27 radar was installed in 1963, and the AN/FPS-66 was retired in 1964. In 1963 the site also used AN/FPS-6A and AN/FPS-26A height-finder radars. The site became an ADC/FAA joint-use facility around 1966.

Over the years, the equipment at the station was upgraded or modified to improve the efficiency and accuracy of the information gathered by the radars. The 772nd Radar Squadron continued operating the AN/FPS-27 and AN/FPS-26A radars until 1983. The squadron was inactivated in 1984. However, an AN/FPS-117 became operational in 1986 under contractor support. This radar served as a prototype for units installed in Alaska. After shutdown in 1992, this radar was moved to Murphy Dome Air Force Station, Alaska.

Radar coverage for the Philadelphia area was assumed by the FAA's site at Trevose, PA. Then, a portion of the Gibbsboro site was transferred to the FAA in 1995 for installation of an ARSR-4 set, and the Trevose site was shut down. Today what was Gibsboro AFS has largely been disassembled. The FAA Joint Surveillance System (JSS) radar radome and a few old Air Force buildings are about all that remain. Among those buildings, the old Gap Filler support building from 1957 still stands.

== Air Force units and assignments ==
=== Units ===
- 772d Radar Squadron (SAGE), moved from Claysburg Air Force Station, PA, 1 May 1961

Redesignated as 772d Radar Squadron on 1 February 1974
Inactivated ca. 31 December 1984

=== Assignments ===
- New York Air Defense Sector, 1 May 1961
- 21st Air Division, 1 April 1966
- 35th Air Division, 1 December 1967
- 21st Air Division, 19 November 1969
- Eastern Air Defense Sector, 1 June 1992 – December 1984

== See also ==
- United States general surveillance radar stations
- List of United States Air Force aircraft control and warning squadrons
- Philadelphia Defense Area, PA-NJ (Nike missile)
