= BOMARC missile accident site =

Contaminated missile accident site

Coordinates: 40°2′4.43″N 74°26′34.56″W

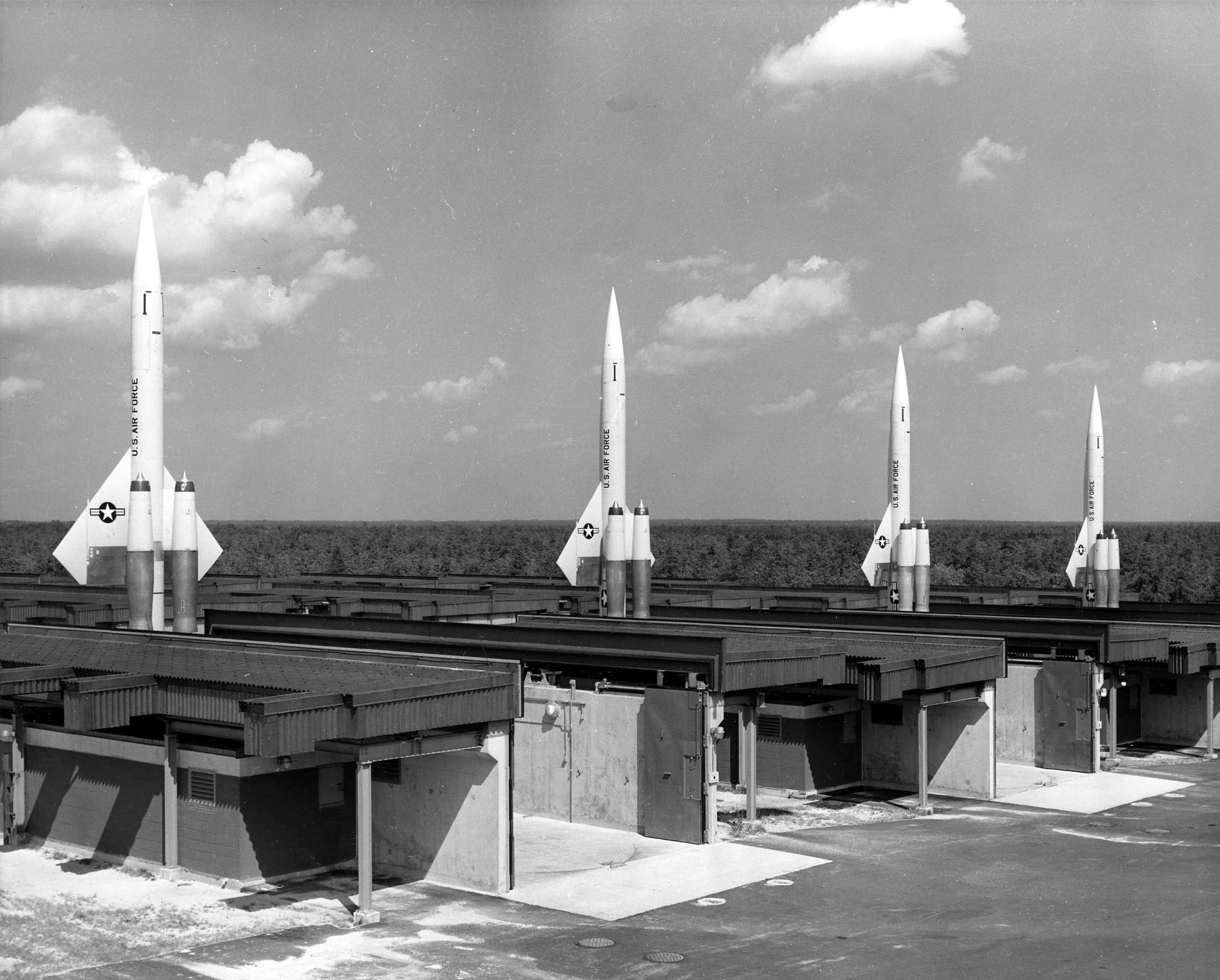
The BOMARC launch complex at McGuire AFB

BOMARC Site RW-01 is a 75-acre (30 ha) fenced-off site contaminated primarily with "weapons-grade plutonium (WGP), highly-enriched and depleted uranium." On 7 June 1960 an explosion in a CIM-10 Bomarc missile fuel tank caused the accident and subsequent contamination. The explosion occurred at Launcher Shelter 204, McGuire AFB, Ocean County, New Jersey, approximately 16.1 miles (25.9 km) south-southeast of Trenton, New Jersey. Launcher Shelter 204 was one of fifty-four located at McGuire AFB, operated by the 46th Air Defense Missile Squadron.

== BOMARC Base No. 1 ==
The BOMARC Base No. 1 site was 218 acres (88 ha) within the "Range and Impact Area" at the Northeast corner of McGuire AFB. It was one of two BOMARC bases of the New York Air Defense Sector. It was the first operational BOMARC base and had both a "Missile Support Area" with a Squadron Operations Center and a "Launch Area" with 56 Mode II Launcher Shelters in 2 flights (e.g., 2 compressor buildings were available to simultaneously get 2 missiles to the "Standby" stage prior to "Fire-up".) The missile complex was an annex of McGuire Air Force Base 6 mi (9.7 km) to the west where the sector's SAGE Direction Center (DC-01) was the missile launch control center. Planning for the base began in 1955, and construction began January 1958, aiming to begin operations in January 1960. and it became operational on 1 September 1959 with 3 IM-99A missiles (24 by 1 January). In December 1959, Col. Robert E. Stuart was the base commander, the 46th Air Defense Missile Squadron (BOMARC) commander was Lt. Col. Ernest B. Sheppard, and the Boeing support office was in New Egypt.

External images
- 1960 damage to Launcher Shelter 204
- 21st century photos of shelter damage
- various facility photos

== 1960 IM-99 accident ==
"On 7 June 1960, an explosion in a helium tank between the missile's fuel tanks took place in Shelter 204 causing a fire in a liquid-fueled, nuclear-tipped BOMARC missile. The fire burned uninhibited for about 30 minutes. Firefighting activities, using water as a suppressant, were conducted for 15 hours. As a result, materials from the shelter flowed under the front shelter doors, down the asphalt apron and street between the row of shelters, and into the drainage ditch". "Contamination was restricted to an area immediately beneath the weapon and an adjacent elongated area approximately 100 feet long". A nuclear response team from Griffiss Air Force Base found "no trace of dispersed radiation" during spot checks "outside the facility's boundaries" for 66 mi (106 km). Approximately 300 g (11 oz) of WGP was not recovered, "A significant fraction of the radiological material contained in the weapon [was] shipped…to Medina Base, San Antonio TX" and then to Amarillo.

According to the Trenton Times, “In June 1987, traces of a radioactive substance used in nuclear warheads (americium-241 related to plutonium) were found about one-half mile from the site." In a 1992 report, the Air Force wrote that the missile launcher from Shelter 204 had been removed from the shelter shortly after the accident, and that no records about the manner of disposal of the missile launcher existed. They found five anomalous areas which could represent the buried launcher. From 1999-2000 the USGS sampled and tested the Kirkwood-Cohansey aquifer with shallow ground water and sediment for radionuclides. No manmade radionuclide was present in the well-bottom sediments, or unfiltered or filtered water samples. From April 2002 through May 27, 2004, 21,998 yd^{3} (16,819 m^{3}) of "contaminated debris and soils were packaged, shipped, and disposed" at Clive, Utah; the remains of the shelter were removed. In 2005, the contaminated area was estimated as 7 acres and ~60 yd^{3} (46 m^{3}) were additionally remediated by 2007. The 1972 RW-01 perimeter fence with height 6 ft (1.8 m) topped with barbed wire was extended by 2007 to include a larger area on the south. A 2013 study compared the characteristics of the accident's particle release with the nuclear warhead dispersals of the 1966 Palomares B-52 crash and 1968 Thule Air Base B-52 crash.
