= CIM-10 Bomarc =

Long-range surface-to-air missile

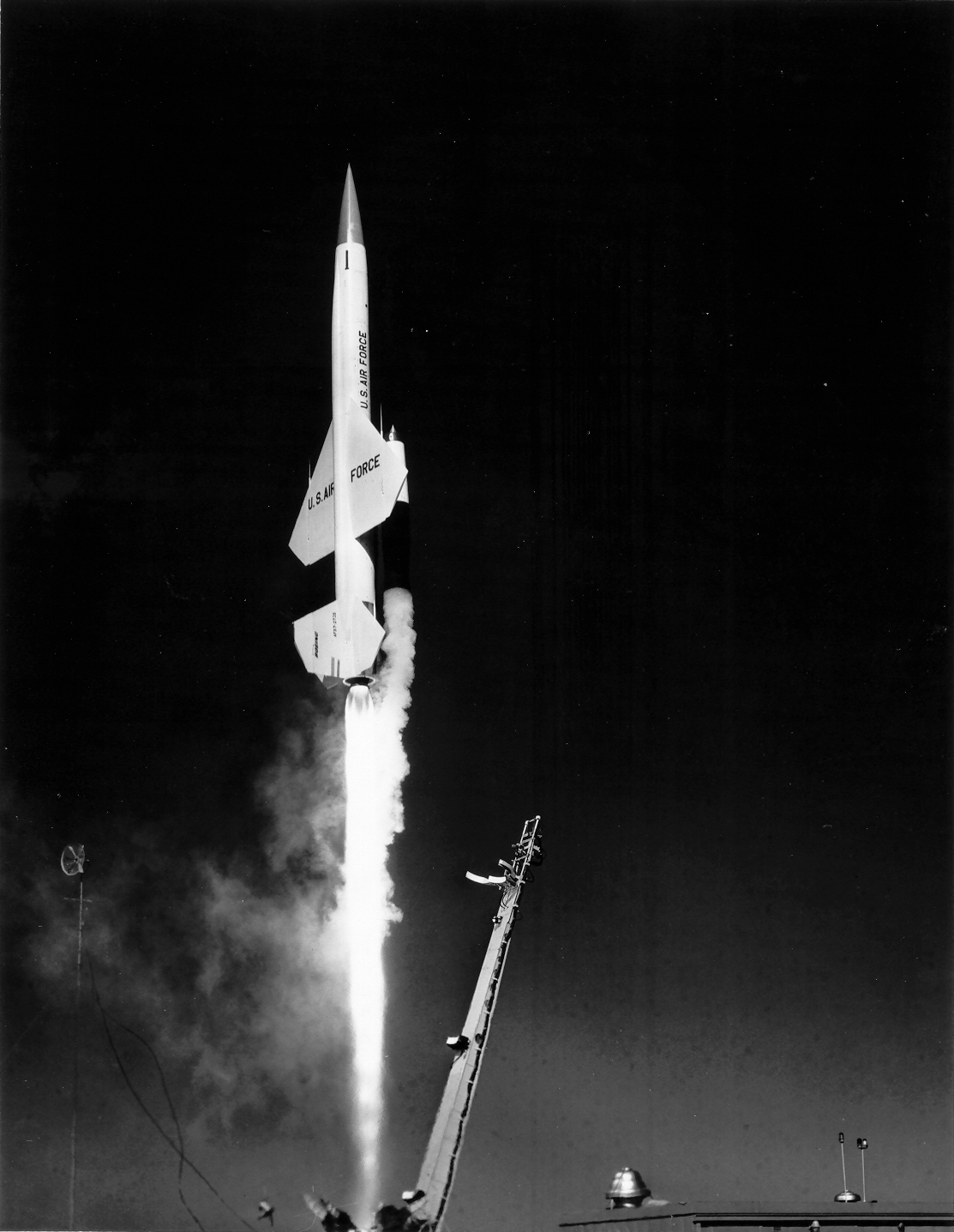
- A Bomarc missile begins its "climb phase" of launch. The midcourse phase and homing dive used ramjets.
- Type: Surface-to-air missile
- Place of origin: United States

Service history
- In service: 1959 to 1 October 1972
- Used by: United States Air Force; Royal Canadian Air Force; Canadian Forces

Production history
- Manufacturer: Boeing Pilotless Aircraft Division
- Produced: 1958
- No. built: 570 (269 CIM-10A, 301 CIM-10B)

Specifications
- Diameter: 35 in (890 mm)
- Wingspan: 218.2 in (5,540 mm)
- Warhead: W40 nuclear warhead
- Engine: booster rocket; ramjet
- Flight ceiling: 100,000 ft (30,000 m)
- Guidance system: Initially ground-controlled, active radar homing terminal guidance

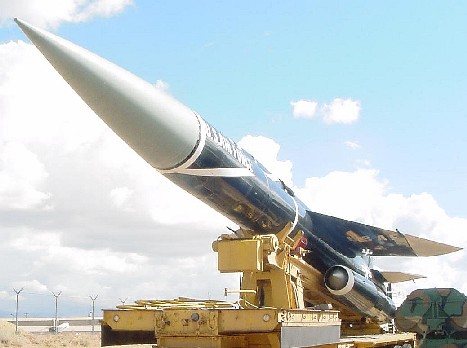

The Boeing CIM-10 Bomarc ("Boeing Michigan Aeronautical Research Center") (IM-99 Weapon System prior to September 1962) was a supersonic ramjet powered long-range surface-to-air missile (SAM) used during the Cold War for the air defense of North America. In addition to being the first operational long-range SAM and the first operational pulse doppler aviation radar, it was the only SAM deployed by the United States Air Force.

Stored horizontally in a launcher shelter with a movable roof, the missile was erected, fired vertically using rocket boosters to high altitude, and then tipped over into a horizontal Mach 2.5 cruise powered by ramjet engines. This lofted trajectory allowed the missile to operate at a maximum range as great as 430 mi (690 km). Controlled from the ground for most of its flight, when it reached the target area it was commanded to begin a dive, activating an onboard active radar homing seeker for terminal guidance. A radar proximity fuse detonated the warhead, either a large conventional explosive or the W40 nuclear warhead.

The Air Force originally planned for a total of 52 sites covering most of the major cities and industrial regions in the US. The United States Army was deploying their own systems at the same time, and the two services fought constantly both in political circles and in the press over who should get the defensive mission. Development dragged on, and by the time it was ready for deployment in the late 1950s the Army had successfully deployed the much shorter range Nike Hercules that they claimed filled any possible need through the 1960s, despite Air Force claims to the contrary.

As testing continued, the Air Force reduced its plans to sixteen sites, and then again to eight with an additional two sites in Canada. The first US site was declared operational in 1959, but with only a single working missile. Bringing the rest of the missiles into service took years, by which time the system was obsolete as the nuclear threat had moved from crewed bombers to the intercontinental ballistic missile (ICBM). Deactivations began in 1969 and by 1972 all Bomarc sites had been shut down. A small number were used as target drones, and only a few remain on display today.

== Design and development ==
=== Initial studies ===
During World War II, the US Army Air Force (USAAF) concluded that existing anti-aircraft guns, only marginally effective against existing generations of propeller-driven aircraft, would not be effective at all against the emerging jet-powered designs. Like the Germans and British before them, they concluded the only successful defence would be to use guided weapons.

As early as 1944 the United States Army started exploring anti-aircraft missiles, examining a variety of concepts. At the time, two basic concepts appeared possible; one would use a short-range rocket that flew directly at the target from below following a course close to the line-of-sight, and the other would fly up to the target's altitude and then tip over and fly horizontally towards the target like a fighter aircraft. As both concepts seemed promising, the Army Air Force was given the task of developing the airplane-like design, while the Army Ordnance Department was given the more ballistic collision-course concept. Official requirements were published in 1945.

Official requirements were published in 1945; Bell Laboratories won the Ordnance contract for a short-range line-of-sight weapon under Project Nike, while a team of players led by Boeing won the contract for a long-range design known as Ground-to-Air Pilotless Aircraft, or GAPA. GAPA moved to the United States Air Force when that branch was formed in 1947. In 1946, the USAAF also started two early research projects into anti-missile systems in Project Thumper (MX-795) and Project Wizard (MX-794).

=== Bomarc A ===
Formally organized in 1946 under USAAF project MX-606, by 1950 Boeing had launched more than 100 test rockets in various configurations, all under the designator XSAM-A-1 GAPA. The tests were very promising, and Boeing received a USAF contract in 1949 to develop a production design under project MX-1599.

The MX-1599 missile was to be a ramjet-powered, nuclear-armed long-range surface-to-air missile to defend the Continental United States from high-flying bombers. The Michigan Aerospace Research Center (MARC) was added to the project soon afterward, and this gave the new missile its name Bomarc (for Boeing and MARC). In 1951, the USAF decided to emphasize its point of view that missiles were nothing else than pilotless aircraft by assigning aircraft designators to its missile projects, and anti-aircraft missiles received F-for-Fighter designations. The Bomarc became the F-99.

By this time, the Army's Nike project was progressing well and would enter operational service in 1953. This led the Air Force to begin a lengthy series of attacks on the Army in the press, a common occurrence at the time known as "policy by press release". When the Army released its first official information on Ajax to the press, the Air Force responded by leaking information on BOMARC to Aviation Week, and continued to denigrate Nike in the press over the next few years, in one case showing a graphic of Washington being destroyed by nuclear bombs that Ajax failed to stop.

Tests of the XF-99 test vehicles began in September 1952 and continued through early 1955. The XF-99 tested only the liquid-fueled booster rocket, which would accelerate the missile to ramjet ignition speed. In February 1955, tests of the XF-99A propulsion test vehicles began. These included live ramjets, but still had no guidance system or warhead. The designation YF-99A had been reserved for the operational test vehicles. In August 1955, the USAF discontinued the use of aircraft-like type designators for missiles, and the XF-99A and YF-99A became XIM-99A and YIM-99A, respectively. Originally the USAF had allocated the designation IM-69, but this was changed (possibly at Boeing's request to keep number 99) to IM-99 in October 1955.

By this time, Ajax was widely deployed around the United States and some overseas locations, and the Army was beginning to develop its much more powerful successor, Nike Hercules. Hercules was an existential threat to BOMARC, as its much greater range and nuclear warhead filled many of the roles that BOMARC was designed for. A new round of fighting in the press broke out, capped by an article in The New York Times entitled "Air Force Calls Army Nike Unfit To Guard Nation".

In October 1957, the first YIM-99A production-representative prototype flew with full guidance, and succeeded in passing the target within the intended warhead's destructive radius. In late 1957, Boeing received the production contract for the IM-99A Bomarc A, and in September 1959, the first IM-99A squadron became operational.

The IM-99A had an operational radius of 200 miles (320 km) and was designed to fly at Mach 2.5–2.8 at a cruising altitude of 60,000 feet (18,000 m). It was 46.6 ft (14.2 m) long and weighed 15,500 pounds (7,000 kg). Its armament was either a 1,000-pound (450 kg) conventional warhead or a W40 nuclear warhead (7–10 kiloton yield). A liquid-fuel rocket engine boosted the Bomarc to Mach 2, when its Marquardt RJ43-MA-3 ramjet engines, fueled by 80-octane gasoline, would take over for the remainder of the flight. This was the same model of engine used to power the Lockheed X-7, the Lockheed AQM-60 Kingfisher drone used to test air defenses, and the Lockheed D-21 launched from the back of an M-21, although the Bomarc and Kingfisher engines used different materials due to the longer duration of their flights.

=== Operational units ===
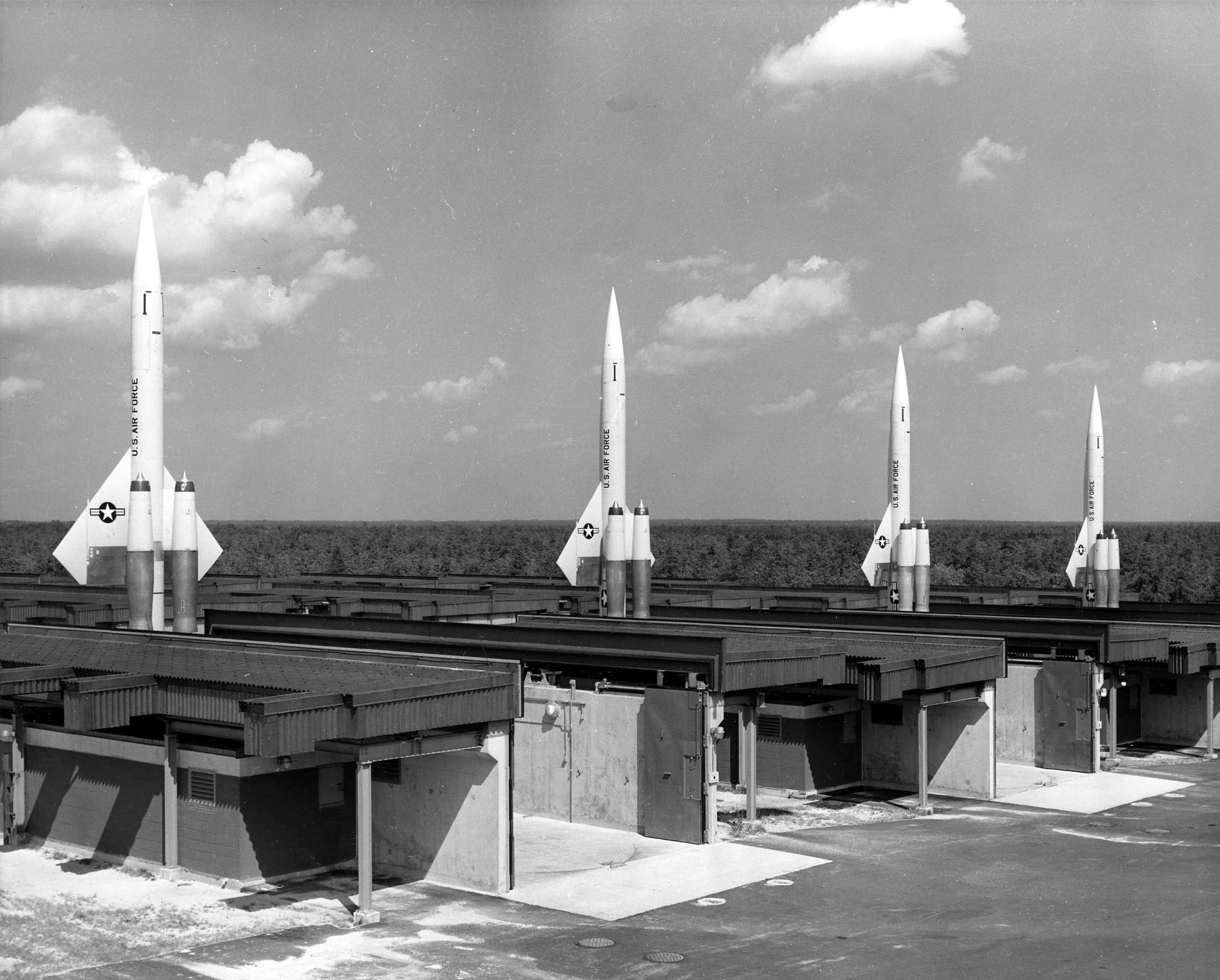
October 1960, BOMARCs in New Jersey (BOMARC Site No. 1)

The operational IM-99A missiles were based horizontally in semi-hardened shelters, nicknamed "coffins". After the launch order, the shelter's roof would slide open, and the missile raised to the vertical. After the missile was supplied with fuel for the booster rocket, it would be launched by the Aerojet General LR59-AJ-13 booster. After sufficient speed was reached, the Marquardt RJ43-MA-3 ramjets would ignite and propel the missile to its cruise speed of Mach 2.8 at an altitude of 66,000 ft (20,000 m).

When the Bomarc was within 10 mi (16 km) of the target, its own Westinghouse AN/DPN-34 radar guided the missile to the interception point. The maximum range of the IM-99A was 250 mi (400 km), and it was fitted with either a conventional high-explosive or a 10 kiloton W-40 nuclear fission warhead.

The Bomarc relied on the Semi-Automatic Ground Environment (SAGE), an automated control system used by NORAD for detecting, tracking and intercepting enemy bomber aircraft. SAGE allowed for remote launching of the Bomarc missiles, which were housed in a constant combat-ready basis in individual launch shelters in remote areas. At the height of the program, there were 14 Bomarc sites located in the US and two in Canada.

=== Bomarc B ===
The liquid-fuel booster of the Bomarc A had several drawbacks. It took two minutes to fuel before launch, which could be a long time in high-speed intercepts, and its hypergolic propellants (hydrazine and nitric acid) were very dangerous to handle, leading to several serious accidents.

As soon as high-thrust solid-fuel rockets became a reality in the mid-1950s, the USAF began to develop a new solid-fueled Bomarc variant, the IM-99B Bomarc B. It used a Thiokol XM51 booster, and also had improved Marquardt RJ43-MA-7 (and finally the RJ43-MA-11) ramjets. The first IM-99B was launched in May 1959, but problems with the new propulsion system delayed the first fully successful flight until July 1960, when a supersonic MQM-15A Regulus II drone was intercepted. Because the new booster required less space in the missile, more ramjet fuel could be carried, thus increasing the range to 430 mi (700 km). The terminal homing system was also improved, using the world's first pulse Doppler search radar, the Westinghouse AN/DPN-53. All Bomarc Bs were equipped with the W-40 nuclear warhead. In June 1961, the first IM-99B squadron became operational, and Bomarc B quickly replaced most Bomarc A missiles. On 23 March 1961, a Bomarc B successfully intercepted a Regulus II cruise missile flying at 100,000 ft (30,000 m), thus achieving the highest interception in the world up to that date.

Boeing built 570 Bomarc missiles between 1957 and 1964, 269 CIM-10A, 301 CIM-10B.

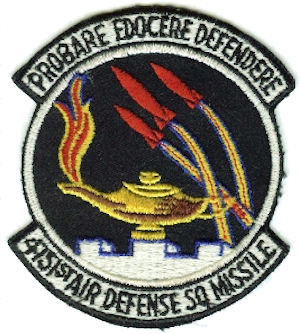
4751st ADMS (Training) Emblem

In September 1958 Air Research & Development Command decided to transfer the Bomarc program from its testing at Cape Canaveral Air Force Station to a new facility on Santa Rosa Island, south of Eglin AFB Hurlburt Field on the Gulf of Mexico. To operate the facility and to provide training and operational evaluation in the missile program, Air Defense Command established the 4751st Air Defense Wing (Missile) (4751st ADW) on 15 January 1958. The first launch from Santa Rosa took place on 15 January 1959.

== Operational history ==
In 1955, to support a program which called for 40 squadrons of BOMARC (120 missiles to a squadron for a total of 4,800 missiles), ADC reached a decision on the location of these 40 squadrons and suggested operational dates for each. The sequence was as follows: ... l. McGuire 1/60 2. Suffolk 2/60 3. Otis 3/60 4. Dow 4/60 5. Niagara Falls 1/61 6. Plattsburgh 1/61 7. Kinross 2/61 8. K.I. Sawyer 2/61 9. Langley 2/61 10. Truax 3/61 11. Paine 3/61 12. Portland 3/61 ... At the end of 1958, ADC plans called for construction of the following BOMARC bases in the following order: l. McGuire 2. Suffolk 3. Otis 4. Dow 5. Langley 6. Truax 7. Kinross 8. Duluth 9. Ethan Allen 10. Niagara Falls 11. Paine 12. Adair 13. Travis 14. Vandenberg 15. San Diego 16. Malmstrom 17. Grand Forks 18. Minot 19. Youngstown 20. Seymour-Johnson 21. Bunker Hill 22. Sioux Falls 23. Charleston 24. McConnell 25. Holloman 26. McCoy 27. Amarillo 28. Barksdale 29. Williams.

=== United States ===
The first USAF operational Bomarc squadron was the 46th Air Defense Missile Squadron (ADMS), organized on 1 January 1959 and activated on 25 March. The 46th ADMS was assigned to the New York Air Defense Sector at McGuire Air Force Base, New Jersey. The training program, under the 4751st Air Defense Wing used technicians acting as instructors and was established for a four-month duration. Training included missile maintenance; SAGE operations and launch procedures, including the launch of an unarmed missile at Eglin. In September 1959 the squadron assembled at their permanent station, the Bomarc site near McGuire AFB, and trained for operational readiness. The first Bomarc-A were used at McGuire on 19 September 1959 with Kincheloe AFB getting the first operational IM-99Bs. While several of the squadrons replicated earlier fighter interceptor unit numbers, they were all new organizations with no previous historical counterpart.

ADC's initial plans called for some 52 Bomarc sites around the United States with 120 missiles each but as defense budgets decreased during the 1950s the number of sites dropped substantially. Ongoing development and reliability problems didn't help, nor did Congressional debate over the missile's usefulness and necessity. In June 1959, the Air Force authorized 16 Bomarc sites with 56 missiles each; the initial five would get the IM-99A with the remainder getting the IM-99B. However, in March 1960, HQ USAF cut deployment to eight sites in the United States and two in Canada.

==== Bomarc incident ====
Within a year of operations, a Bomarc A with a nuclear warhead caught fire at McGuire AFB on 7 June 1960 after its on-board helium tank exploded. While the missile's explosives did not detonate, the heat melted the warhead and released plutonium, which the fire crews spread. The Air Force and the Atomic Energy Commission cleaned up the site and covered it with concrete. This was the only major incident involving the weapon system. The site remained in operation for several years following the fire. Since its closure in 1972, the area has remained off limits, primarily due to low levels of plutonium contamination. Between 2002 and 2004, 21,998 cubic yards of contaminated debris and soils were shipped to what was then known as Envirocare, located in Utah.

==== Modification and deactivation ====
In 1962, the US Air Force started using modified A-models as drones; following the October 1962 tri-service redesignation of aircraft and weapons systems they became CQM-10As. Otherwise the air defense missile squadrons maintained alert while making regular trips to Santa Rosa Island for training and firing practice. After the inactivation of the 4751st ADW(M) on 1 July 1962 and transfer of Hurlburt to Tactical Air Command for air commando operations the 4751st Air Defense Squadron (Missile) remained at Hurlburt and Santa Rosa Island for training purposes.

In 1964, the liquid-fueled Bomarc-A sites and squadrons began to be deactivated. The sites at Dow and Suffolk County closed first. The remainder continued to be operational for several more years while the government started dismantling the air defense missile network. Niagara Falls was the first BOMARC B installation to close, in December 1969; the others remained on alert through 1972. In April 1972, the last Bomarc B in U.S. Air Force service was retired at McGuire and the 46th ADMS inactivated and the base was deactivated.

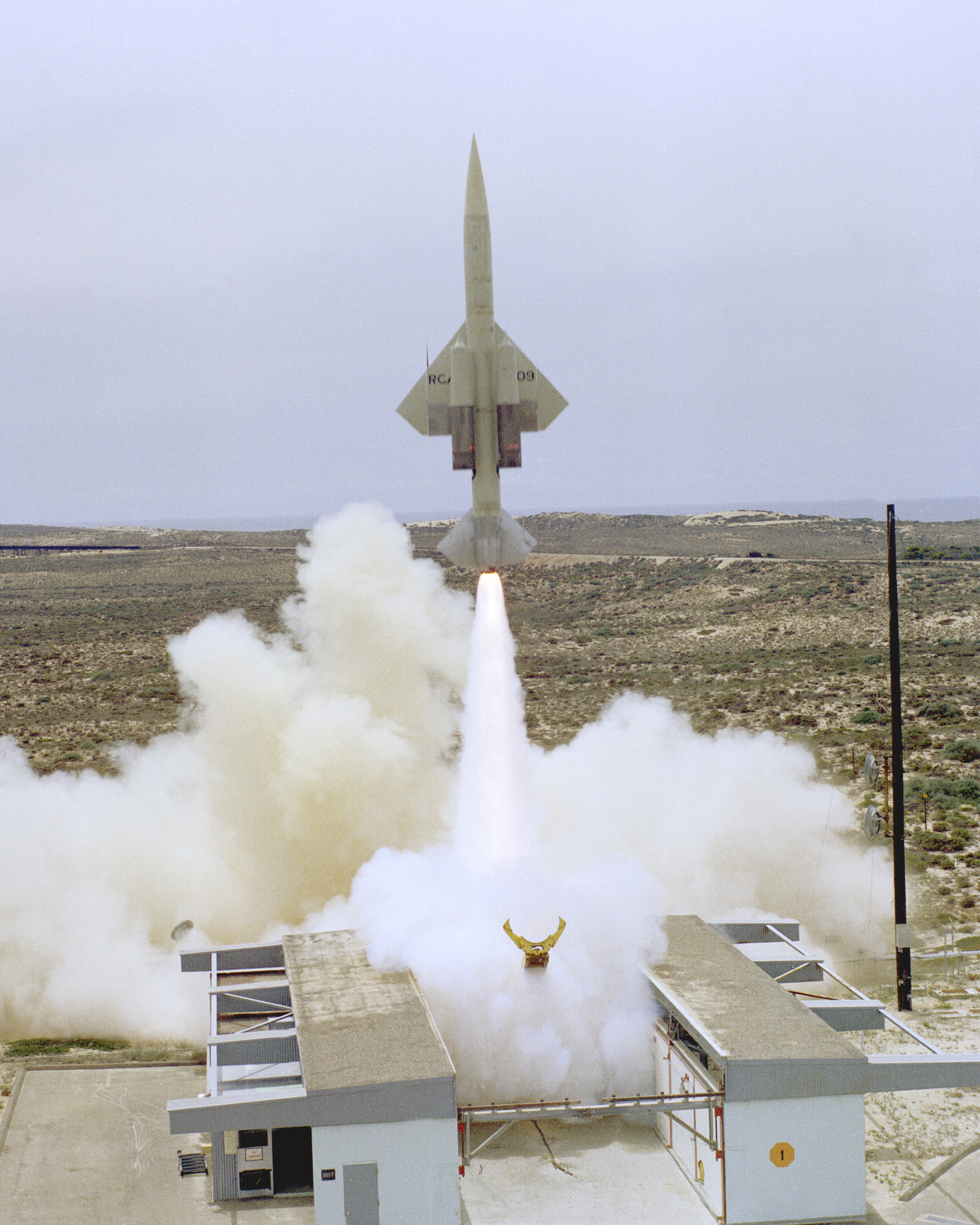
A CQM-10B drone launched at Vandenberg Air Force Base, 1977.

In the era of the intercontinental ballistic missiles the Bomarc, designed to intercept relatively slow crewed bombers, had become a useless asset. The remaining Bomarc missiles were used by all armed services as high-speed target drones for tests of other air-defense missiles. The Bomarc A and Bomarc B targets were designated as CQM-10A and CQM-10B, respectively.

Following the accident, the McGuire complex has never been sold or converted to other uses and remains in Air Force ownership, making it the most intact site of the eight in the US.

=== Canada ===
The Bomarc Missile Program was highly controversial in Canada. The Progressive Conservative government of Prime Minister John Diefenbaker initially agreed to deploy the missiles, and shortly thereafter controversially scrapped the Avro Arrow, a supersonic crewed interceptor aircraft, arguing that the missile program made the Arrow unnecessary.

Initially, it was unclear whether the missiles would be equipped with nuclear warheads. By 1960 it became known that the missiles were to have a nuclear payload, and a debate ensued about whether Canada should accept nuclear weapons. Ultimately, the Diefenbaker government decided that the Bomarcs should not be equipped with nuclear warheads. The dispute split the Diefenbaker Cabinet, and led to the collapse of the government in 1963. The Official Opposition and Liberal Party leader Lester B. Pearson originally was against nuclear missiles, but reversed his personal position and argued in favour of accepting nuclear warheads. He won the 1963 election, largely on the basis of this issue, and his new Liberal government proceeded to accept nuclear-armed Bomarcs, with the first being deployed on 31 December 1963. When the nuclear warheads were deployed, Pearson's wife, Maryon, resigned her honorary membership in the anti-nuclear weapons group, Voice of Women.

Canadian operational deployment of the Bomarc involved the formation of two specialized Surface/Air Missile squadrons. The first to begin operations was No. 446 SAM Squadron at RCAF Station North Bay, which was the command and control center for both squadrons. With construction of the compound and related facilities completed in 1961, the squadron received its Bomarcs in 1961, without nuclear warheads. The squadron became fully operational from 31 December 1963, when the nuclear warheads arrived, until disbanding on 31 March 1972. All the warheads were stored separately and under control of Detachment 1 of the USAF 425th Munitions Maintenance Squadron at Stewart Air Force Base. During operational service, the Bomarcs were maintained on stand-by, on a 24-hour basis, but were never fired, although the squadron test-fired the missiles at Eglin AFB, Florida on annual winter retreats.

No. 447 SAM Squadron operating out of RCAF Station La Macaza, Quebec, was activated on 15 September 1962 although warheads were not delivered until late 1963. The squadron followed the same operational procedures as No. 446, its sister squadron. With the passage of time the operational capability of the 1950s-era Bomarc system no longer met modern requirements; the Department of National Defence deemed that the Bomarc missile defense was no longer a viable system, and ordered both squadrons to be stood down in 1972. The bunkers and ancillary facilities remain at both former sites.

== Variants ==
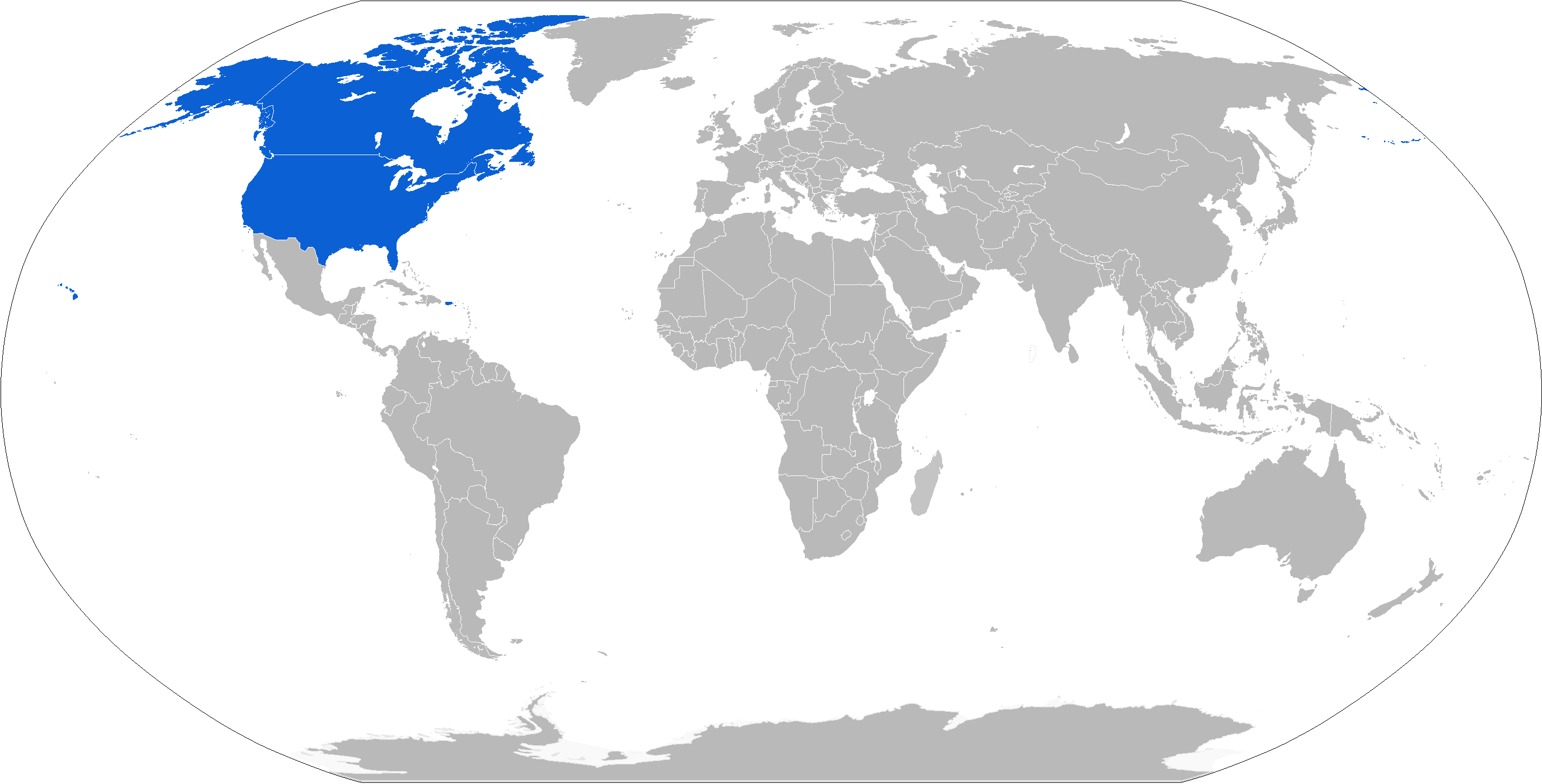
Map with CIM-10 operators in blue

- XF-99 (experimental for booster research)
- XF-99A/XIM-99A (experimental for ramjet research)
- YF-99A/YIM-99A (service-test)
- IM-99A/CIM-10A (initial production)
- IM-99B/CIM-10B ("advanced")
- CQM-10A (target drone developed from CIM-10A)
- CQM-10B (target drone developed from CIM-10B)

== Operators ==
/ Canada

- Royal Canadian Air Force from 1955 to 1968 / Canadian Forces from 1968 to 1972

446 SAM Squadron: 28 IM-99B, CFB North Bay, Ontario 1962–1972

Bomarc site located at 46°25′46″N 079°28′16″W

447 SAM Squadron: 28 IM-99B, La Macaza, Quebec (La Macaza – Mont Tremblant International Airport) 1962–1972

Bomarc site located at 46°24′41″N 074°46′08″W (Approximately)

United States

- United States Air Force Air (later Aerospace) Defense Command

6th Air Defense Missile Squadron, 56 IM-99A

Activated on 1 February 1959
Assigned to: New York Air Defense Sector
Inactivated 15 December 1964
Stationed at: Suffolk County Air Force Base Missile Annex, New York

Bomarc site located 3 miles SW at 40°50′00″N 072°40′51″W

22d Air Defense Missile Squadron: 28 IM-99A/28 IM-99B

Activated on 15 September 1959
Assigned to: Washington Air Defense Sector
Reassigned to: 33d Air Division, 1 April 1966
Reassigned to: 20th Air Division, 19 November 1969
Inactivated: 31 October 1972
Stationed at: Langley AFB, Virginia

Bomarc site located 3 miles WNW at 37°05′57″N 076°28′47″W

26th Air Defense Missile Squadron: 28 IM-99A/28 IM-99B

Activated 1 March 1959
Assigned to: Boston Air Defense Sector
Reassigned to: 35th Air Division, 1 April 1966
Reassigned to: 21st Air Division, 19 November 1969
Inactivated: 30 April 1972
Stationed at: Otis Air Force Base BOMARC site, Massachusetts

Bomarc site located 1 mile NNW at 41°40′56″N 070°32′21″W

30th Air Defense Missile Squadron: 28 IM-99A

Activated on 1 June 1959
Assigned to Bangor Air Defense Sector
Inactivated: 15 December 1964
Stationed at Dow AFB, Maine

Bomarc site located 4 mils NNE at 44°51′11″N 068°47′11″W

35th Air Defense Missile Squadron: 56 IM-99B

Activated 1 June 1960
Assigned to Syracuse Air Defense Sector
Reassigned to: Detroit Air Defense Sector, 4 September 1963
Reassigned to: 34th Air Division, 1 April 1966
Reassigned to: 35th Air Division, 15 September 1969
Inactivated: 31 December 1969
Stationed at: Niagara Falls Air Force Missile Site, New York

Bomarc site located at 43°07′03″N 078°56′49″W

37th Air Defense Missile Squadron: 28 IM-99B

Activated 1 March 1960
Assigned to 30th Air Division
Reassigned to: Sault Sainte Marie Air Defense Sector, 1 April 1960
Reassigned to: Duluth Air Defense Sector, 1 October 1963
Reassigned to: 29th Air Division, 1 April 1966
Reassigned to: 23d Air Division, 19 November 1969
Inactivated 31 July 1972
Stationed at: Kincheloe AFB, Michigan

Bomarc site located 19 miles NW at Raco 46°20′53″N 084°48′18″W

46th Air Defense Missile Squadron: 28 IM-99A/56 IM-99B

Activated 1 January 1959
Assigned to New York Air Defense Sector
Reassigned to: 21st Air Division, 1 April 1966
Reassigned to: 35th Air Division, 1 December 1957
Reassigned to: 21st Air Division, 19 November 1969
Inactivated 31 October 1972
Stationed at: McGuire AFB, New Jersey

Bomarc site located 4 miles ESE at 40°02′06″N 074°26′29″W

74th Air Defense Missile Squadron: 28 IM-99B

Activated 1 April 1960
Assigned to Duluth Air Defense Sector
Reassigned to: 29th Air Division, 1 April 1966
Reassigned to: 23d Air Division, 19 November 1969
Inactivated 30 April 1972
Stationed at: Duluth International Airport, Minnesota

Bomarc site located 10 miles NE at 46°55′56″N 091°53′00″W

4751st Air Defense Missile Squadron

Activated 15 January 1959
Assigned to 73d Air Division (Weapons)
Reassigned to: 32d Air Division, 1 October 1959
Reassigned to: Montgomery Air Defense Sector, 1 July 1962
Reassigned to: Air Defense, Tactical Air Command, 1 September 1979
Inactivated 30 September 1979
Stationed at: Eglin Auxiliary Field #9 (Hurlburt Field), Florida

Bomarc site located on Santa Rosa Island at 30°23′18″N 086°48′28″W
Bomarc site located at Eglin Auxiliary Field #5 (Piccolo Field) at 30°35′37″N 086°37′18″W

- Air Force Systems Command

Cape Canaveral Air Force Station, Florida

Launch Complex 4 (LC-4) was used for Bomarc testing and development launches 2 February 1956 – 15 April 1960 (17 Launches). 28°27′59″N 080°32′08″W

Vandenberg Air Force Base, California

Two launch sites, BOM-1 and BOM-2 were used by the United States Navy for Bomarc launches against aerial targets. The first launch taking place on 25 August 1966. The last two launches occurred on 14 July 1982. BOM1 49 launches; BOM2 38 launches. 34°48′02″N 120°35′57″W

Locations under construction but not activated. Each site was programmed for 28 IM-99B missiles:

- Camp Adair, Oregon 44°42′08″N 123°12′00″W
- Charleston AFB, South Carolina
- Ethan Allen AFB, Vermont 44°30′38″N 073°09′49″W
- Paine Field, Washington 47°54′43″N 122°15′55″W
- Travis AFB, California 38°29′14″N 121°53′07″W
- Truax Field, Wisconsin 43°11′27″N 089°09′15″W
- Vandenberg AFB, California 34°43′47″N 120°30′15″W

Reference for BOMARC units and locations:

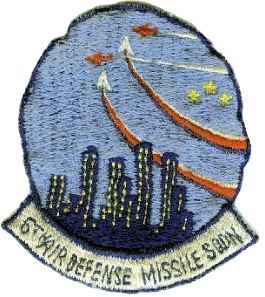
6th ADMS

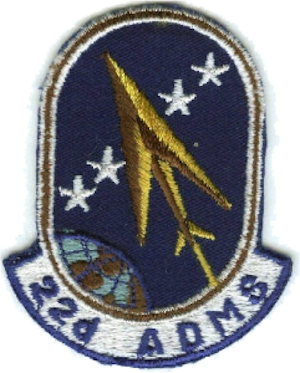
22d ADMS

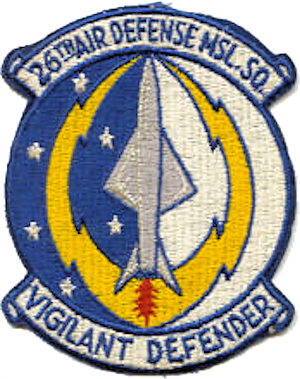
26th ADMS

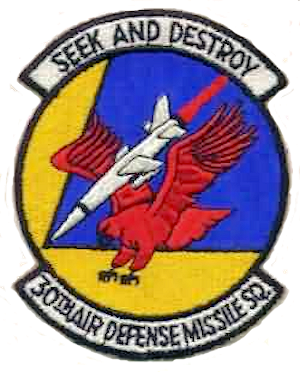
30th ADMS

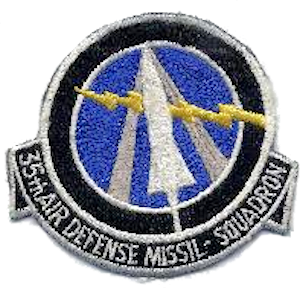
35th ADMS

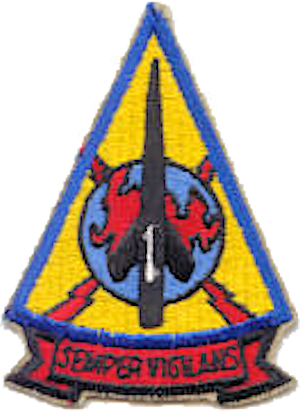
37th ADMS

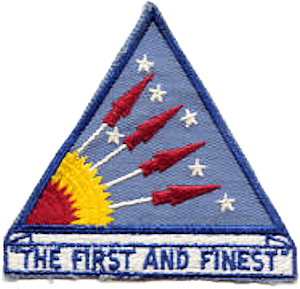
46th ADMS

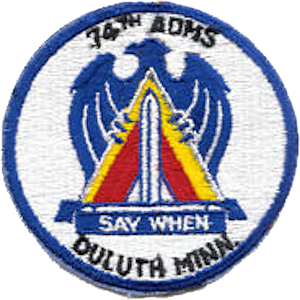
74th ADMS

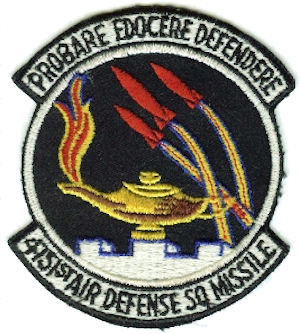
4751st ADMS

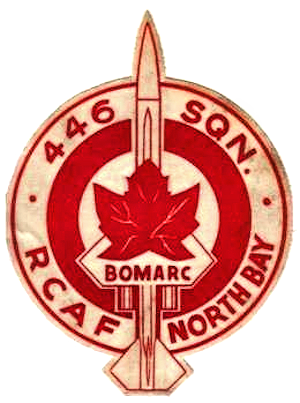
RCAF 446 Sqdn

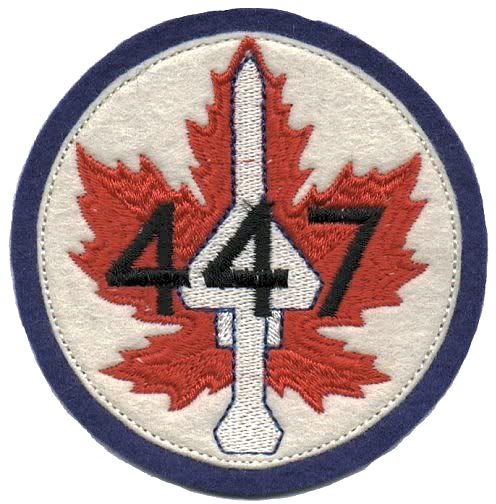
RCAF 447 Squdn

== Surviving missiles ==
Although a number of IM-99/CIM-10 Bomarcs have been placed on public display, because of concerns about the possible environmental hazards of the thoriated magnesium structure of the airframe several have been removed from public view.

Russ Sneddon, director of the Air Force Armament Museum, Eglin Air Force Base, Florida provided information about missing CIM-10 exhibit airframe serial 59–2016, one of the museum's original artifacts from its founding in 1975 and donated by the 4751st Air Defense Squadron at Hurlburt Field, Eglin Auxiliary Field 9, Eglin AFB. As of December 2006, the suspect missile was stored in a secure compound behind the Armaments Museum. In December 2010, the airframe was still on premises, but partly dismantled.

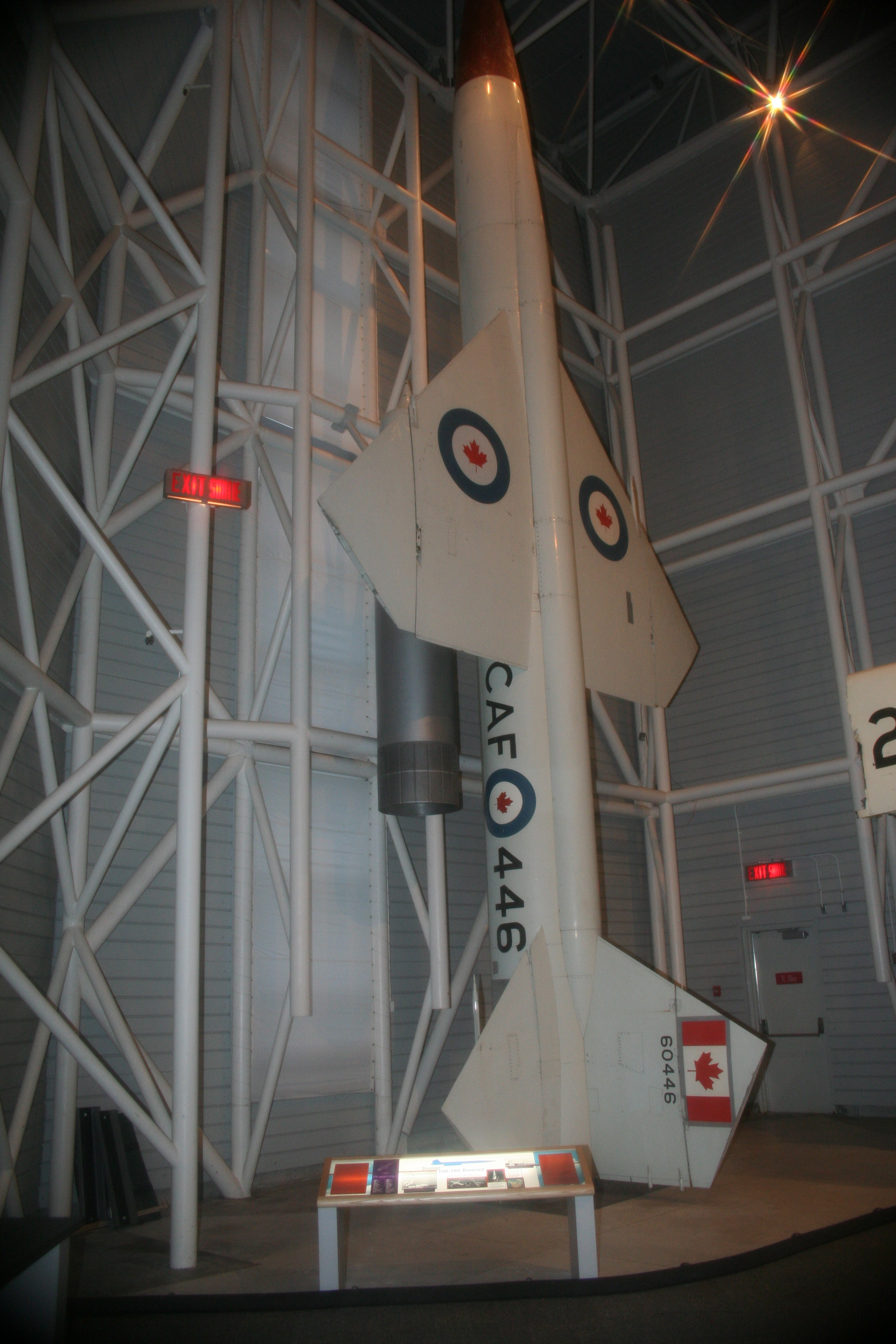
Bomarc B on display at the Canada Aviation and Space Museum Ottawa, Ontario, Canada, c. 2006.

Below is a list of museums or sites which have a Bomarc missile on display or in storage:

- Air Force Armament Museum, Eglin Air Force Base, Florida. In storage.
- Air Force Space & Missile Museum, Cape Canaveral Air Force Station, Florida. It is on display Hangar C.
- Alberta Aviation Museum, Edmonton, Alberta, Canada
- Canada Aviation and Space Museum, Ottawa, Ontario, Canada
- Hill Aerospace Museum, Hill Air Force Base, Utah
- Historical Electronics Museum, Linthicum, Maryland (display of AN/DPN-53, the first airborne pulse-doppler radar, used in the Bomarc)
- Illinois Soldiers & Sailors Home, Quincy, Illinois
- Keesler Air Force Base, Biloxi, Mississippi
- Museum of Aviation, Robins Air Force Base, Warner Robins, Georgia
- National Museum of Nuclear Science & History, Kirtland Air Force Base, Albuquerque, New Mexico
- Octave Chanute Aerospace Museum (former Chanute Air Force Base), Rantoul, Illinois; the museum closed on 30 December 2015
- Peterson Air and Space Museum, Peterson Air Force Base, Colorado
- Strategic Air and Space Museum, Ashland, Nebraska
- USAF Airman Heritage Museum, Lackland Air Force Base, San Antonio, Texas
- Vandenberg Air Force Base (Space and Missile Heritage Center), California. Bomarc not for public access.

== Impact on popular music ==
The Bomarc missile captured the imagination of the American and Canadian popular music industry, giving rise to a pop music group, the Bomarcs (composed mainly of servicemen stationed on a Florida radar site that tracked Bomarcs), a record label, Bomarc Records, and a moderately successful Canadian pop group, The Beau Marks.

== See also ==
Aircraft of comparable role, configuration, and era

- Blue Envoy, UK system of very similar performance, cancelled in 1957 in favor of the Bristol Bloodhound.
