= Mont-Tremblant International Airport =

Airport in La Macaza, Quebec, Canada

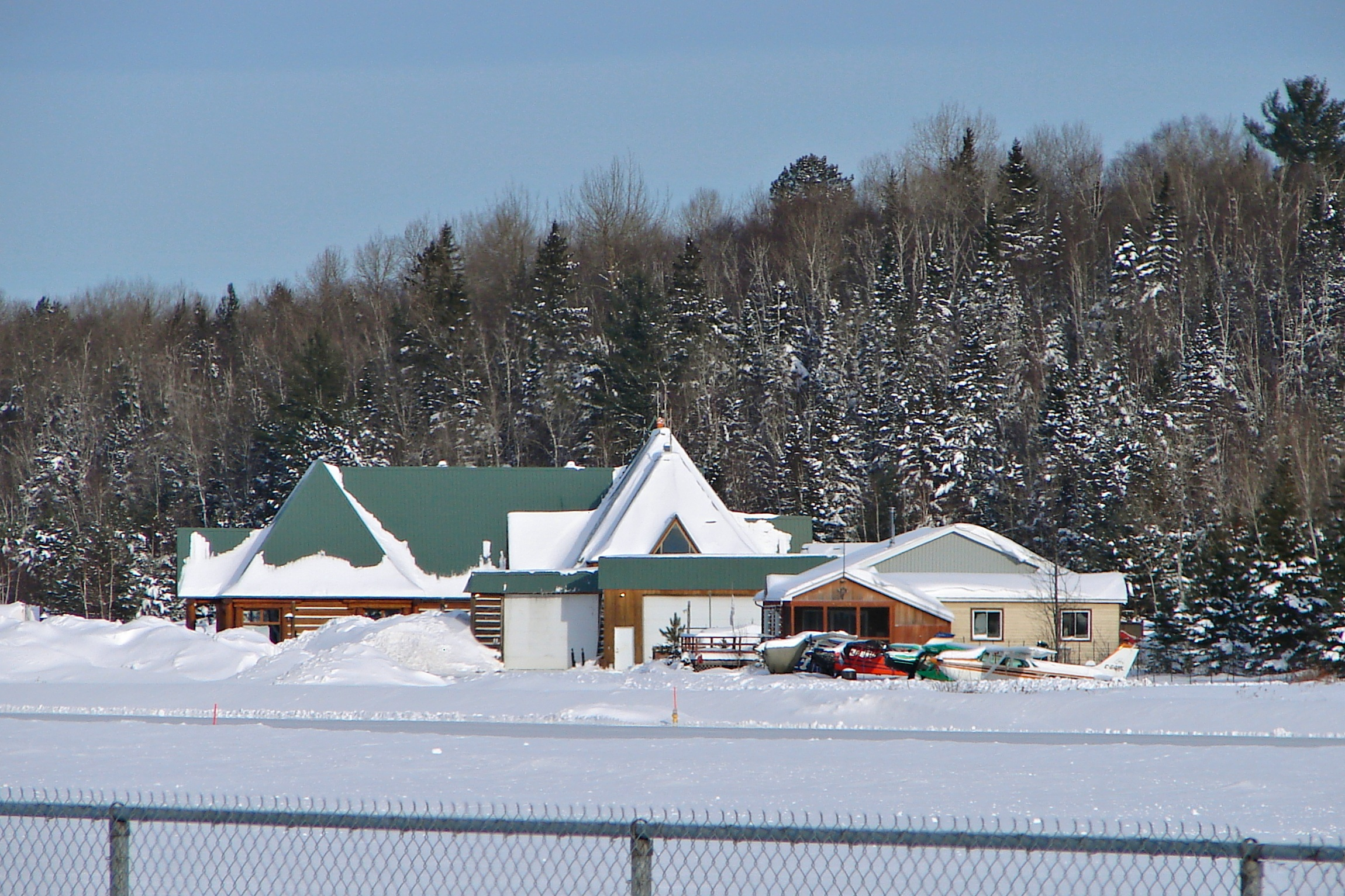
- IATA: YTM; ICAO: CYFJ

Summary
- Airport type: Private
- Operator: Mont-Tremblant Intl Inc
- Serves: Mont-Tremblant, Quebec
- Location: La Macaza, Quebec
- Time zone: EST (UTC−05:00)
  - Summer (DST): EDT (UTC−04:00)
- Elevation AMSL: 825 ft (251 m)
- Coordinates: 46°24′33″N 074°46′48″W
- Website: www.aeroport-tremblant.ca

Map
- Location in Quebec

Runways
Direction	Length		Surface
Direction	ft	m	Surface
02/20	5,902	1,799	Asphalt
- Source: Canada Flight Supplement

Mont-Tremblant International Airport (IATA: YTM, ICAO: CYFJ) (officially La Macaza – Mont-Tremblant International and formerly Rivière Rouge – Mont-Tremblant International Airport) is a single runway airport located in the township of La Macaza, 2.5 nautical miles (4.6 km; 2.9 mi) north of the village, about 25 nautical miles (46 km; 29 mi) north of Mont-Tremblant, Quebec, Canada.

== History ==
The airport was completed in 1962 for the Royal Canadian Air Force (RCAF) by Boeing to military specifications, as an RCAF emergency landing field, with a runway of 6,000 ft (1,829 m). It became home to 447 SAM Squadron, armed with 29 nuclear tipped CIM-10 Bomarc missiles. After 1968 the station became CFB La Macaza and closed as an active base in 1972 following the removal of the Bomarc missiles. The area that was used for the Bomarc launchers was converted into the La Macaza Institution, a federal penitentiary operated by the Correctional Service of Canada, in 1978.

It was converted to be a civilian airport, and then turned into an international airport in 2000 despite a referendum held in the region in which the citizens of La Macaza opposed the project.

In December 2007, Continental Airlines began seasonal service to its Newark hub. The airport was served during the ski season and summer months by Porter Airlines until 2022 and between December and March by Air Canada until 2019.

== Facilities ==
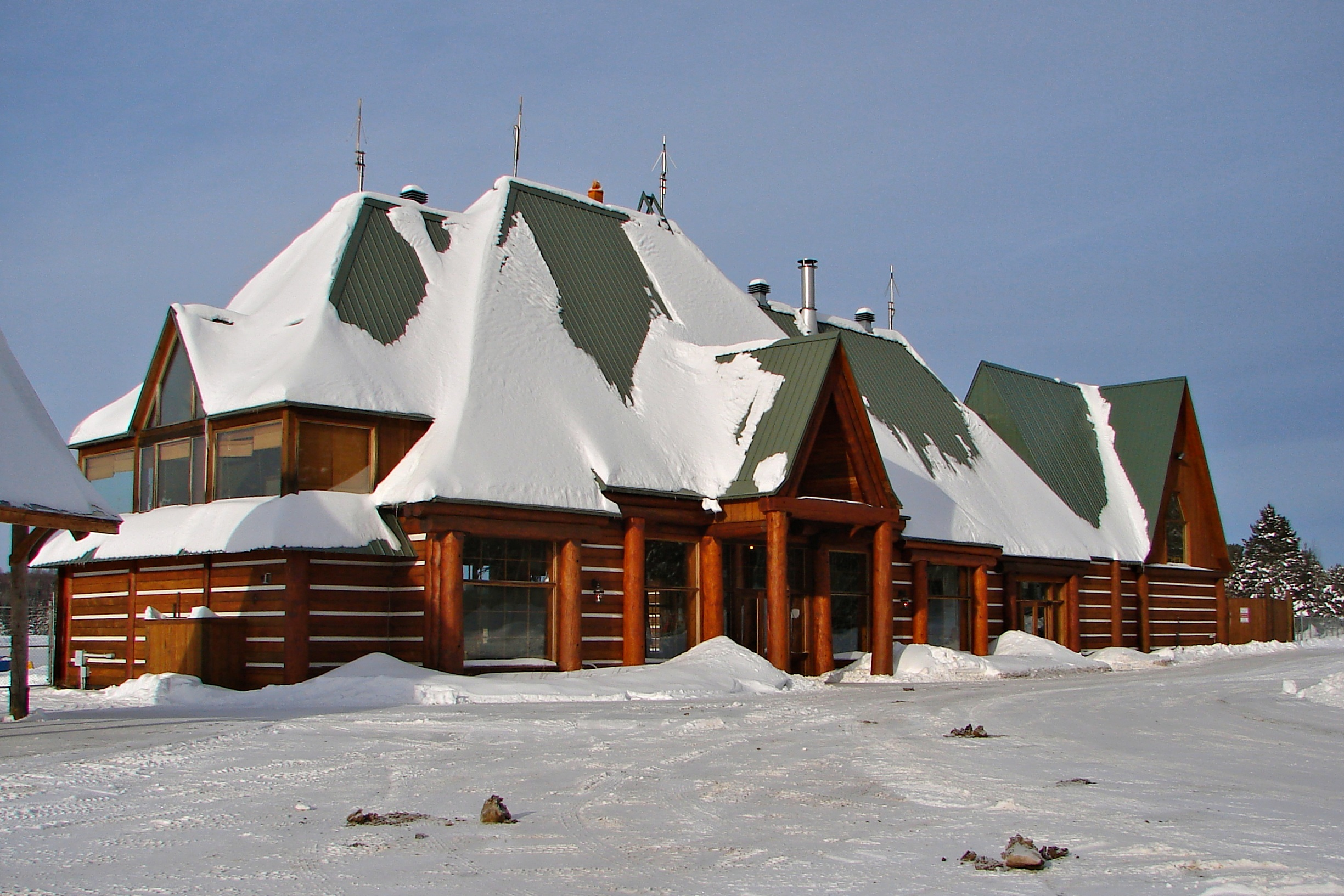
Terminal building

The airport consists of a small chalet-style terminal building along the east side of the runway and south of the prison facility. There are no hangars for aircraft storage.

The airport is classified as an airport of entry by Nav Canada and is staffed by the Canada Border Services Agency (CBSA) on a call-out basis from the Mirabel Airport. CBSA officers at this airport can handle general aviation aircraft only, with no more than 15 passengers.

The airport is about a 40-minute taxi ride from the resort at Mont Tremblant in good road conditions. It can take up to an hour in winter snow conditions as part of the road is secondary pavement with many twists and turns.

The airport is equipped with de-icing equipment and operates year-round.

== Expansion plans ==
The airport operator is planning to expand the airport services by extending the runway to 2,500 m (8,202 ft) (to allow larger jets to land), building a larger terminal (moved to the north end of the runway from the current southeast side of the runway) and adding a water aerodrome (waterside terminal for floatplanes) on the south end of Lac Chaud.
