= Niagara Falls Air Force Missile Site =

Cold War missile launch complex

- Part of Syracuse Air Defense Sector
- Location; E of Tuscarora Rd, W of drainage ditch along Niagara Falls Air Force Base, 5.1 mi (8.2 km) ENE of Niagara Falls, New York

Site information
- Type: surface-to-air missile base
- Controlled by: Air Defense Command 1961-8; Aerospace Defense Command 1968-9

Location
- Coordinates: 43°07′04″N 078°56′50″W

Garrison information
- Garrison: 35th Air Defense Missile Squadron

The "Niagara Falls AF Missile Site" was one of two BOMARC bases in New York (BOMARC Base No.1 was in New Jersey, BOMARC Base No.2 was on Long Island). New York defenses protected Cold War industrial complexes of the eastern Great Lakes. A nearby BOMARC Radio Site (not shown) was for transmitting ground-controlled interception commands generated at DC-03 to launched missiles based on tracking data from SAGE radars such as Z-49 & Z-21 at Lockport AFS.

Z21 was co-located with the Project Nike Army Air Defense Command Post for the 1961 Niagara Falls-Buffalo Defense Area which included numerous missile sites (three shown in green).

The Niagara Falls Air Force Missile Site was a Cold War USAF launch complex for Boeing CIM-10 Bomarc surface-to-air missiles. It was operated by the 35th Air Defense Missile Squadron. Equipped only IM-99Bs (46 missiles: solid-state, solid-fuel booster), the site had 48 Model IV "coffin" shelters, after an initial design with a secure area of ~20 acres (8.1 ha) to have 28 shelters (the planned site had additional area for 84 "future shelters"). Launch control for the site's missiles was by central NY's "Hancock Field combined direction-combat center" (CC-01/DC-03) at Syracuse, New York. DC-03 was operational on December 1, 1958; (CC-01 was the "first SAGE regional battle post", beginning operations "in early 1959".)

Construction began in 1959. The missile site and squadron were activated on 1 June 1960, and missiles were operational on 1 December 1961. In January 1962 the RF-62E gap filler radar site at Brookfield Air Force Station in Ohio became a "major off-base…installation" of the Niagara Falls site, transferred from Wright-Patterson AFB. In 1962, command of the BOMARC base transferred from Col. John A. Sarosy to Col James L. Livingston.

The site was the first BOMARC B launch complex to close, on 31 December 1969. The closure was part of a realignment of "307 military bases". The missile site was vacant until turned over to the Niagara Falls Municipal Airport. The 1959 "Access Road" is now Johnson Street of the "Niagara Falls Air Reserve Station (NFARS) Fuel Depot", built over the area of the BOMARC shelters, which are still visible. The former northwest corner of the missile site is the current Tuscarora Road military gate.

External images
- 1959 plan w/28 shelters
- overhead views
- NFARS Fuel Depot with BOMARC foundations

The 35th Air Defense Missile Squadron (BOMARC) was constituted on 17 December 1959 and activated on 1 June 1960 in the Syracuse Air Defense Sector. It was transferred to the Detroit Air Defense Sector on 4 September 1963, the 34th Air Division on 1 April 1966, the 35th Air Division on 15 September 1969, and the 21st Air Division on 19 November 1969. It was inactivated on 31 December 1969.
