= Continental Air Forces =

1944–1946 United States Army Air Forces major command

Continental Air Forces (CAF) was a United States Army Air Forces major command, active 1944–1946. It was tasked with combat training of bomber and fighter personnel, and for Continental United States (CONUS) air defense. This took place after the Aircraft Warning Corps and Ground Observer Corps were placed in standby during 1944. It conducted planning for the postwar United States general surveillance radar stations, and the planning to reorganize to a separate USAF was for CAF to become the USAF Air Defense Command.

On 21 March 1946, CAF headquarters personnel and facilities at Bolling Field, along with one of CAF's four Air Forces (Second Air Force—which had its HQ inactivated on 30 March) became Strategic Air Command. Eighth Air Force and Fifteenth Air Force were transferred later to SAC. Most of the CAF airfields that had not been distributed to other commands when SAC was activated were subsequently transferred to Air Defense Command (to which CAF's First and Fourth Air Forces were assigned on 21 March), Tactical Air Command (Third Air Force), and Air Materiel Command between March 1946 and March 1947.

== Background ==
On 16 January 1941, four Air Districts were established (Northeast, Northwest, Southeast, and Southwest). The air districts handled air defense, "organization and training of bomber, fighter and other units and crews for assignments overseas", and training maneuvers with the Army Ground Forces. The four districts were redesignated on 26 March 1941 as the First Air Force, Second Air Force, Third Air Force, and Fourth Air Force, respectively.

== Activation ==
CAF was activated 12 December 1944 at Andrews Field with Brigadier General Eugene H. Beebe in command. The four continental air forces became its components, which consolidated the CONUS air defense mission under one command. In August 1945 CAF was assigned the AAF Radar Bomb Scoring mission for bomber training/evaluation when Mitchel Field's 63d Army Air Force Base Unit transferred to CAF. CAF's air defense mission was documented in AAF Regulation 20-1, dated 15 September 1945.

A plan for developing Andrews Field as the headquarters of the Continental Air Forces for September 1944 was enacted. (CAF HQ eventually transferred from Andrews to Bolling Field).

=== Post-war radar network planning ===
After a June 1945 meeting with AAF headquarters about air defense, CAF recommended "research and development be undertaken on radar and allied equipment for an air defense system [for] the future threat", e.g., a "radar [with] range of 1,000 miles, [to detect] at an altitude of 200 miles, and at a speed of 1,000 miles per hour". The HQ AAF Director of Operations responded that "until the kind of defense needed to counter future attacks could be determined, AC&W planning would have to be restricted to the use of available radar sets". CAF's January 1946 Radar Defense Report for Continental United States recommended the military characteristics of a post-war Air Defense System "based upon such advanced equipment", and the Plans organization of HQ AAF reminded "the command that radar defense planning had to be based on the available equipment". At the Watson Laboratories in New Jersey, AMC's Electronics Subdivision held a "Manufacturers Conference" on 26–28 June 1946 for planning the "Improved Search Radar".

=== Air Force separation ===
Planning to reorganize for a separate USAF had begun by fall 1945 Simpson Board to plan "the reorganization of the Army and the Air Force". In January 1946 "Generals Eisenhower and Spaatz agreed on an Air Force organization [composed of] the Strategic Air Command, the Air Defense Command, the Tactical Air Command, the Air Transport Command and the supporting Air Technical Service Command, Air Training Command, the Air University, and the Air Force Center."

== Reorganization ==
The Continental Air Forces reorganization began by 31 January 1946 when Abilene Army Airfield was closed. On 16 October 1945 CAF's Muroc Field was transferred from CAF to Air Technical Service Command. Moody Army Airfield transferred to AAF Training Command on 1 November 1945. CAF's Bolling Field was assigned control of Andrews Field on 3 January 1946 and also Richmond Army Air Base on 2 February 1946.

Tyndall Field transferred quickly to Continental Air Forces on 28 February 1946, then TAC, and the Air University (15 May 1946). CAF had 13 bombardment groups transferred to its numbered air forces just before it was disestablished, e.g., 40th, 44th (2 AF), the 93d, 444th, 448th (became 92d), 449th, 467th (effectively became 301st), 485th, 498th (became 307th), 58th Bombardment Wing, Very Heavy, and 73d Bombardment Wing, Very Heavy.

Interceptor and radar network plans at CAF HQ were passed on to ADC. CAF installations reassigned on 21 March 1946 included Grandview transferred to the Army Division Engineers, Mitchel Field to ADC, and both Tyndall Field and Army Air Base, Knob Knoster, to TAC. After the HQ transfer to SAC on 21 March, numerous CAF airfields transferred to TAC, ADC, and AMC from 23 March 1946 to 16 March 1947:

- Bergstrom Field and Brooks Field (transferred to TAC on 23 March 1946)
- Myrtle Beach AAF (to ADC on 27 March 1946)
- Shaw Army Airfield (ADC on 1 April 1946)
- Blytheville AAF, Dover AAF, March Field, McChord Field, and Pope Field (TAC, 1 April 1946)
- Kirtland Army Air Field (Air Materiel Command, 1 December 1946)
- Bolling Field (Bolling Field Command, 16 December 1946)
- Alamogordo Army Air Field (AMC, 16 March 1947)
- Seymour Johnson Field (closed 23 August 1947)

Air Defense Command's first Cold War network was the Lashup Radar Network, which was replaced by the Permanent System that included an improved search radar, which had been recommended by CAF. CAF's studies for computerized airborne early warning and control were developed into the 1950s Lincoln Transition System that became the Semi-Automatic Ground Environment.

== Aftermath ==
The US Army Air Forces redesignated Continental Air Forces as Strategic Air Command (SAC) on 21 March 1946. SAC was inactivated in 1992.
