= Permanent System radar stations =

1950s U.S. military radar network

The Permanent System ("P system") was a 1950s radar network ("P radar net") used for the CONUS "manual air defense system" and which had a USAF aircraft control and warning (AC&W) organization of personnel and military installations with radars to allow Air Defense Command ground-controlled interception of Cold War bombers attacking the United States.

== Planning ==
During World War II the United States Army organized a network of "Army Radar Stations", Aircraft Warning Corps information centers, Ground Observer Corps filter centers, and Fighter Control Centers (which were "inactivated...in April 1944") to provide air defence.

A similar post-war system was planned. The Distant Early Warning Line was "first conceived—and rejected—in 1946." General Stratemeyer forwarded an air defense plan to General Spaatz in November 1946. In the spring and summer of 1947, three Air Defense Command Aircraft Control and Warning (AC&W) plans went unfunded. e.g., the 8 April 1947, "air defense plan (long term)".

With only 5 "Air Warning Station" radars operating in 1948, the "Radar Fence Plan (code named Project SUPREMACY)" was planned for completion by 1953 with 411 radar stations and 18 control centers. The Radar Fence was rejected by ADC since "no provision was made in it for the Alaska to Greenland net with flanks guarded by aircraft and radar picket ships [required] for 3 to 6 hours of warning time" (the Alaska to Greenland net was eventually built as the Distant Early Warning Line).

ADC's Interim Program and its First Augmentation were planned "until the Supremacy plan network could be approved and constructed", and an $85,500,000 March 1949 Congressional bill funded both the Interim Program "for 61 basic radars and 10 control centers to be deployed in 26 months, with an additional ten radars and one control station for Alaska" and the augmentation's additional 15 radars ("essentially Phase II of Supremacy"). The resulting Lashup Radar Network was completed in April 1950 and was operational in June 1950.

On 13 February 1950, HQ USAF had "advanced the completion date from July 1, 1951, to December 31, 1950, for the most essential radar stations. The USAF reallocated $50 million for the "permanent Modified Plan" (modified from Supremacy) to "start construction on the high Priority Permanent System of radars in February 1950 with the first 24 radar sites to be constructed by the end of 1950". Early June 1950 exercises "in the 58th Air Division [tbd Lashup sites] indicated insufficient low-altitude coverage," and the Secretary of the Air Force requested a 2nd stage of 28 stations on 11 July 1950 (Secretary of Defense approval was on 21 July.)

By November 1950, Ground Observation Corps filter centers (7 in the west, 19 in the east) were being installed. By 10 November a separate Air Defense Command headquarters was approved, the Federal Civil Defense Administration was created in December 1950, and command centers communicated radar track information to the national ADC center that had moved from Mitchell Field to Ent Air Force Base on 8 January 1951.

== Description ==
The "original construction program for the Permanent System" was completed in May 1952, USAF AC&W squadrons were established (renamed Radar Squadrons in the mid-1950s), and the Ground Observation Corps was expanded in 1952 (Operation Skywatch) with over 750,000 volunteers at over 16 thousand posts (98 per post in shifts) and 75 centers.

Air Defense Command MCCs
Air Division	# Coordinates	AFB, etc. DC	ST	Years
n/a	[command center at HQ ADC/NORAD/CONAC]	Ent	CO	1951-63
	MCC-01			
29th	MCC-02 38°50′48″N 094°22′50″W	Richards-Gebaur DC-08	MO	1957-69
	MCC-03			
28th	MCC-06	Hamilton	CA	
	MCC-07			
(Oklahoma City)	MCC-11 35°24′13″N 097°21′27″W	Oklahoma City AFS	OK	
	MCC-16			
	MCC-17			

=== Manual Air Defense Control Centers ===
Manual Air Defense Control Centers (ADCC, MCC) of the Permanent System were USAF command posts for command, control, and coordination by Air Defense Command, including early Cold War ground-controlled interception of enemy aircraft. Each MCC networked radar stations of the sector, plotted radar tracks & visual observations, and forwarded information to ADC command center at Mitchel Field, Ent Air Force Base in 1951, and the new 1954 Ent blockhouse subsequently used by the 1954 CONAD and the 1957 NORAD.

MCCs were generally located at or near a radar station, e.g., Andrews Air Force Base MCC in Maryland (at/near radar station SM-171), Dobbins AFB GA (M-87), Geiger Field WA (SM-172), Kirtland AFB NM (P-41), Norton AFB CA (P-84), Oklahoma City AFS OK (P-52), Roslyn AFS NY (P-3), Snelling AFS MN (P-36), Willow Run AFS MI (P-23), and Wright-Patterson AFB OH (SM-170).

Some MCCs were replaced by Direction Centers of the subsequent SAGE Radar Network, e.g., when McGuire DC-01 was established, the Roslyn Air Force Station MCC became the "Combat Alert Center (Manual)". MCCs continued at several sites where DCs were planned but never built for sectors at Albuquerque, Fort Knox, Kansas City, Miami, Raleigh, San Antonio, Shreveport, and St Louis.

Filter Centers
Filter Centers of the Ground Observation Corps (e.g., in New Haven, Connecticut and Baltimore, Maryland). processed reports from ~8,000 CONUS watch posts. As with ranger stations for forest fires, watch posts measured the azimuth of a target aircraft or formation, and Filter Centers triangulated azimuth observations from 2 or more stations, assessed the reliability of observations, and provided visual track information to MCCs.

=== Radar stations ===
Five radar stations of the Lashup Radar Network were redesignated as Permanent System stations (3 later upgraded with newer radars developed for the Permanent System): Montauk L-10/LP-45/P-45, Fort Custis L-15/LP-56, Palermo L-13/LP-54/P-54, Sault Sainte Marie L-17/LP-20, and Highlands L-12/LP-9/P-9. From March to November 1951, the "LP" designation was also used for 23 new stations for the Permanent System that were outfitted, instead of with radars developed for the Permanent System, with older radars such as the January 1945 General Electric AN/CPS-5 radar, 1948 Western Electric AN/TPS-1B Radar, and Bendix AN/TPS-1C radar.

The LP designator was also used for 1 station opened with AN/FPS-3 and AN/FPS-5 radars in 1950 (Tierra Amarilla LP-8). More than 15 of the new LP stations were subsequently upgraded and designated P-xx stations, and some of the squadrons at LP stations that closed moved to new P stations.

New LP sites not previously designated L sites:

- Bellefontaine LP-73/P-73 (TPS-1B in November 1951),
- Blue Knob LP-63 (TPS-1C 30 November 1951—station moved to Gibbsboro RP-63 in 1961),
- Cambria LP-2/P-2 (TPS-1C November 1951)
- Caswell LP-80/P-80 (TPS-1B March 1951),
- Colville LP-60/P-60 (TPS-1B March 1951, TPS-1C November 1951),
- Condon LP-32/P-32 (TPS-1C November 1951),
- Curlew LP-6/P-6 Mt Bonaparte TPS-1B 1950
- Del Bonita LP-24 (TPS-1B November 1951) (P-24 is Cut Bank AFS),
- Williams Bay AFS Elkhorn LP-31 (moved to RP-31 at Arlington Heights AFS),
- Finland LP-69/P-69 (CPS-5 30 November 1951),
- Fort Custer LP-67/P-67 (TPS-1B 30 November 1951),
- Godman Field LP-82 (TPS-1C 30 April 1952) (P-82 Snow Mountain AFS),
- Gonzales LP-7 (P-7 Continental Divide AFS),
- Hill Peak Road LP-37 (P-37 Point Arena AFS),
- Keweenaw LP-16 (P-16 Calumet AFS),
- Klamath LP-33/P-33 TPS-1B (Apr 51)
- Madera LP-74/P-74 (TPS-1B in March 51),
- Moriarty LP-51/P-51 CPS-5 (30 Nov 51)
- Port Austin LP-61/P-61 TPS-1C 30-Nov-51
- Rockville LP-53/P-53 TPS-1B (30 Nov 51)
- Saddle Mountain/Othello LP-40/P-40 TPS-1B
- San Clemente Island LP-39/P-39 TPS-1C Nov-51
- Tierra Amarilla LP-8/P-8 FPS-3; FPS-5; 1950

Permanent System radars were developed in various programs such as the AN/FPS-6 (in program MX-1353 - "Long range S-band height finder") and AN/MPS-10 (MX-1354 - "Mobile long range search radar set").

Priority Permanent System
The "Priority Permanent System" with the initial (priority) radar stations having new radar systems included "ADC radar site" P-1 at McChord AFB on 1 June 1950. Completed in May 1952 to replace the 1950 Lashup Radar Network, the Priority Permanent System had 5 redesignated LASHUP stations, 23 new stations in 1951 with older radars, 62 stations in 1951 with new equipment, and several of the 10 newly equipped 1952 stations (including Manassas RP-55). The Priority Permanent System used Manual ADCCs, e.g., with Plexiglas plotting boards as at the 1954 Ent Air Force Base command center for ADC.

P system extension
The "first extension of the P system into Canada" ("Canadian extensions") for the Pinetree Line was planned by the "Radar Extension Program" for 33 stations and was agreed by the US and Canada in November 1950. The plan "was submitted to the Permanent Joint Board on Defense on February 6, 1951, and" was subsequently approved by both nations, but by "April 1951 the United States still had not contributed to the Radar Extension Program". On 13 June 1951, the US released $20 million for the stations and by June 1952, the joint Canadian-American committee on the Radar Extension Program was replaced with the "Project Pinetree Office" in Ottawa, Ontario.

Gap-filler and semi-mobile radar stations
On 18 January 1952, ADC proposed the construction of small, unmanned stations with gap filler radars. The USAF Directorate of Plans (War Plans Division) "prepared the proposal … to add 29 mobile and 135 low-altitude stations to ADC's radar system" for completion by the end of 1955. The first phase began with three 1953 stations at Walker M-90, Ellsworth M-97, and Houma M-126 (Z-126); and was completed with 1957 stations at Almaden M-96 (Z-96), Mount Hebo M-100, Jacksonville M-114 (Z-114), and Cherry Point M-116.
The "second-phase mobile radar program" was requested by the ADC commander in October 1952 and was completed from 1954 starting with Geiger Field SM-172 through 1962 with Hastings SM-133 (Z-133). The Planning Guide for the Third Phase Augmentation Radar Program' was issued 5 April 1954, and the 3rd phase was for 29 stations, many for coverage along the U.S.-Mexican border and the Gulf of Mexico (the Air Force Council had agreed with ADC's request for the third phase on 28 October 1953.) The "resulting 104 stations were all to be operational by 1956", and a mock 1956 attack blinded ground defense radars. The third phase of 29 stations was deployed beginning with 5 1957 stations and ended with the 1960 Sundance TM-201 (Z-201). Gap-filler annexes of Mather P-58 (P-58A at Modesto & P-58B at Oroville) were some of the Permanent System stations planned, but never built.

Texas Towers were approved on 11 January 1954, and despite 11 Permanent System radar stations closing in 1957 (N-28 Pinetree station and the M-87, M-101, M-104, M-105, M-106, M-109, M-122, M-128, M-131, & SM-137 stations), at "the end of 1957, ADC operated 182 radar stations…32 had been added during the last half of the year as low-altitude, unmanned gap-filler radars. The total consisted of 47 gap-filler stations, 75 Permanent System radars, 39 semimobile radars, 19 Pinetree stations,…1 Lashup[-era radar and a] single Texas Tower".

Relocated stations
When radar stations began converting to SAGE, 8 Permanent stations that closed from 1959-1964 had their squadrons relocated to stations with "RP" designations, including the radar squadrons from the last 2 remaining "LP" stations: (Elkhorn/Williams Bay LP-31 and Blue Knob/Claysburg LP-63). All but 1 of the relocating squadrons went to new sites (the 770th moved to a 1955 Army radar station designated USAF RP-54 in 1961), and 5 of the units co-located with Project Nike Missile Master units. A 1959-1961 USAF radar squadron was at the Fort Heath radar station of the joint-use site system (JUSS).

== Replacement ==
Groundbreaking for the SAGE System facilities began in 1957, Ground Observer Corps operations ended in 1958, and most Permanent System radar stations were modified to have an AN/FST-2 computer to provide the automated environment (cf. Mather AFB which relayed data through Mill Valley AFS). On "June 26, 1958,…the New York sector became operational" with the SAGE Direction Center at McGuire AFB (DC-01), and in 1959, ADC's Air Divisions and the AC&W Squadrons were redesignated, e.g., the 27th Air Division was renamed between 1 February 1959, and 1 April 1966, as the Los Angeles Air Defense Sector (LAADS); and the 609th AC&W Sq became the "614th Radar Squadron (SAGE)" on 1 September 1959. Permanent System stations not included in the SAGE network were phased out beginning with 9 in 1957; then the first closure for SAGE of a 1951 station (Roslyn P-3) was in 1958.

The radar stations were redesignated with NORAD identification numbers Z-2, etc. on 31 July 1963. The SAGE centers were subsequently replaced with the full operational capability of 7 Joint Surveillance System centers on 23 December 1980, and remaining radar stations of the permanent network include the former 1951 P-37, P-38, and RP-39 which became FAA Ground Equipment Facility radar stations of the Joint Surveillance System.

== See also ==
- Distant Early Warning Line
