= Ground Equipment Facility J-33 =

Federal Aviation Administration (FAA) radar station

Ground Equipment Facility J-33 (Mill Valley Air Force Station until 1980)
- Part of 1951-1968: Air Defense Command 1968-1979: Aerospace Defense Command 1979-1980: Air Defense, Tactical Air Command
- Mount Tamalpais West Peak, 3.1 miles (5.0 km) WNW of Mill Valley
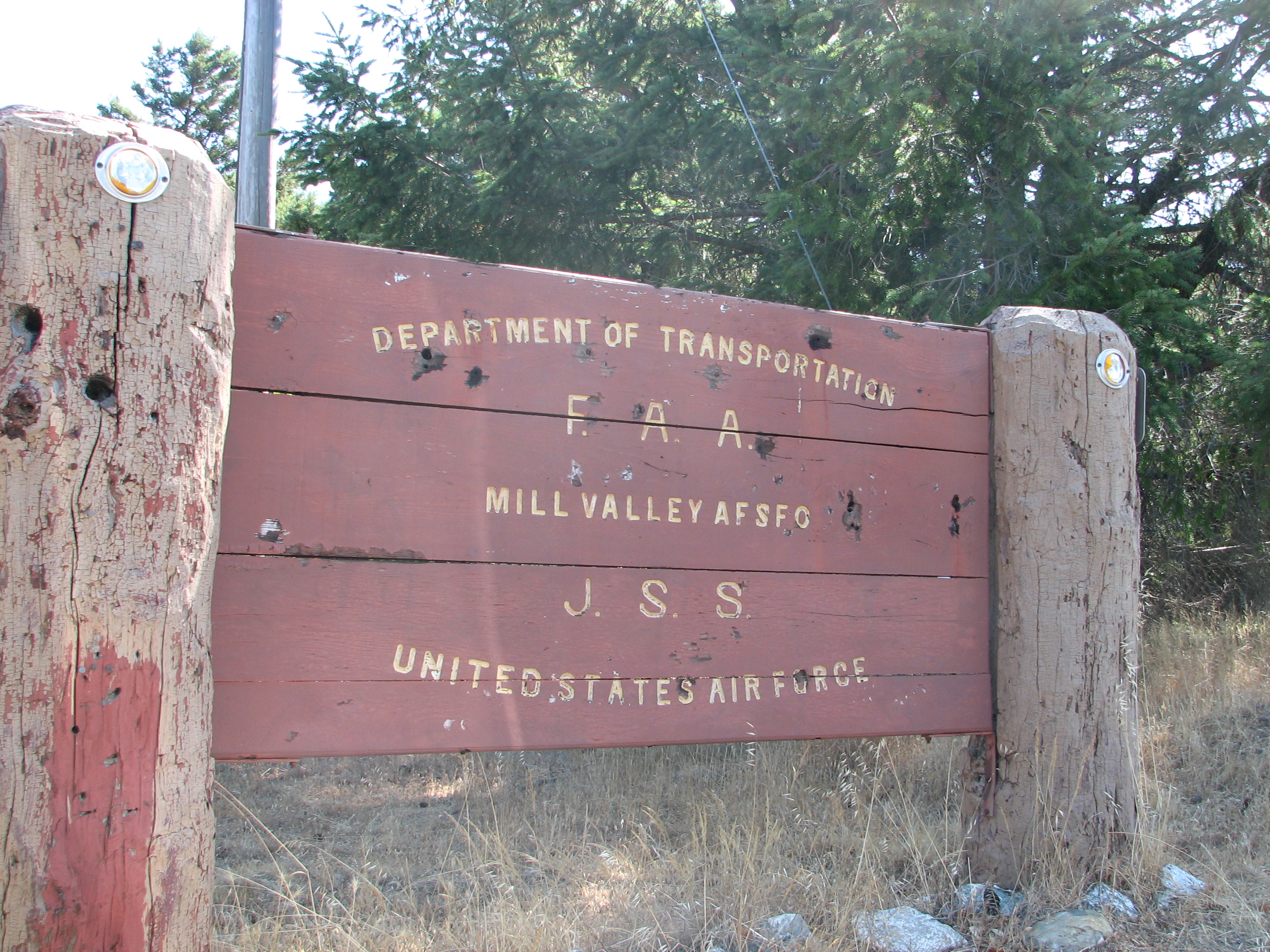
- The FAA sign for the facility

Site information
- Type: Air Route Surveillance Radar
- Owner: Marin Municipal Water District
- Controlled by: Federal Aviation Administration

Location
- Coordinates: 37°55′26″N 122°35′49″W

Site history
- Built: 1951
- In use: 1951-1980 (USAF); 1980-present (FAA)

The NORAD Control Center at Mill Valley AFS was connected to the Ground Air Transmit Receive site at Beale AFB by a pair of buried telephone cables, with a backup connection of dual telephone cables overhead. GATR R-18 was completed by an AMC Project Wild Goose team for providing SAGE TDDL and operational after April 1961.

Ground Equipment Facility J-33 is a Federal Aviation Administration (FAA) radar station of the Joint Surveillance System's Western Air Defense Sector (WADS) with an Air Route Surveillance Radar (ARSR-4). The facility was previously a USAF general surveillance radar station during the Cold War.

The site is located on West Peak of Mount Tamalpais, in Marin County, California.

== History ==
The Cold War radar station near Mill Valley was one of twenty-eight stations approved by the United States Secretary of Defense on July 21, 1950, as part of the Permanent System radar network (the Corps of Engineers managed construction for the USAF). Construction began at an upper location of the former World War II Mount Tamalpais Radar Site of the Aircraft Warning Service (the World War II information center of the AWC was located at tbd for plotting radar tracks in the San Francisco area).

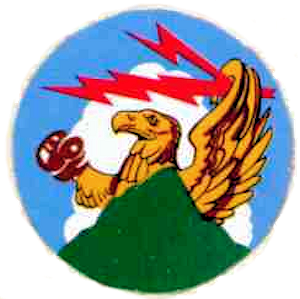
Emblem of the 666th Radar Squadron

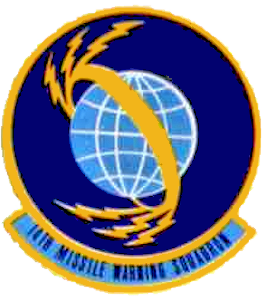
Emblem of the 14th Missile Warning Squadron

=== Mount Tamalpais Air Force Station ===
Mount Tamalpais Air Force Station was the military installation where the 666th Aircraft Control and Warning Squadron was activated on January 1, 1951. The squadron "began operating a pair of AN/CPS-6B radars at this Bay-area site in late 1951". The Air Defense Command Manual Control Center at the station networked ground-controlled interception radars, and on March 10, 1952, the first Multiple Corridor System for identification of traffic arriving from overseas became operational outside San Francisco. Mount Tamalpais AFS was renamed for the nearby Mill Valley community on December 1, 1953.

=== Mill Valley Air Force Station ===
Mill Valley Air Force Station' received an AN/FPS-8 in 1955 (subsequently converted to an AN/GPS-3), and during 1956 an AN/FPS-4 height-finder radar operated (superseded by an AN/FPS-6 in 1958.) Mill Valley began operating an AN/FPS-7 search radar^{1} in 1960 at facility built in 1959 by the General Electric company.

During SAGE deployment, a Burroughs AN/FST-2 Coordinate Data Transmitting Set (CDTS) was installed at Mill Valley AFS and "in late 1960" began providing digitize radar tracks for telecommunication via microwave to the Air Defense Direction Center (DC-18) at Beale Air Force Base (the squadron was re-designated 666th Radar Squadron (SAGE) on 15 January 1961.) By 1961 the 666th added AN/FPS-6 and AN/FPS-6B height-finder radars, and a detachment of the 666th began operating radars at the Mather AFB P-58 radar station which, as with the Fort Ord P-38A gap filler annex (AN/FPS-14 at 36°40′04″N 121°49′05″W), provided radar video to the Mill Valley CDTS for analog-to-digital conversion.

==== NORAD Control Center ====
Mill Valley AFS was the "San Francisco Defense Area NORAD Control Center from 1961 to 1974" after the Army's "40th Artillery Brigade Air Defense Command Post" was established in September 1961. Initially planned to use a Martin AN/MSG-4 command, control, and coordination system (instead deployed to 2 Alaska Nike/Hawk sites), Martin AN/GSG-5 Battery Integration and Radar Display Equipment (BIRDIE) was instead emplaced the Project Nike "Master Direction Center" (SF-90DC). The AADCP operated by the 40th Artillery Brigade from 1959 until June 1971 (13th Air Defense Artillery Group from July 1971 to August 1974) received crosstelling from the Beale DC-18 for coordinating fire from the TBD Nike batteries in the San Francisco Metropolitan Area.

On July 31, 1963, Mill Valley P-38 was redesignated as NORAD ID Z-38. With the inactivation of the San Francisco Air Defense Sector at Beale in 1963, Mill Valley CDTS data was transmitted to Adair AFS, Oregon (DC-13). GATR R-18 was taken over by the 666th RADS as OL-A. In 1964 an AN/FPS-26A height-finder radar replaced the AN/FPS-6 and the AN/FPS-6B was modified to an AN/FPS-90. In 1966 the AN/FPS-26A was converted to an AN/FSS-7 SLBM detection & warning radar operated by the 3d Missile Warning Squadron and later as Detachment 3 14th Missile Warning Squadron on 8 July 1972.

After transfer to Air Defense, Tactical Air Command (ADTAC) on October 1, 1979, the 666th Radar Squadron was inactivated on September 30, 1980 (the SLBM radar deactivated c. 1980). Most Mill Valley AFS property transferred to the NPS (e.g., for Mount Tamalpais State Park), and the radar facilities transferred to the FAA (the USAF retained control of the height-finder that was modified to an AN/FPS-116). In 1995 the FAA operated an AN/FPS-66A search set. In the late 1990s, the AN/FPS-66A was replaced with an ARSR-4 in the old AN/FPS-26A / AN/FSS-7 tower, the only CONUS site to place an ARSR-4 in a tower other than a specially designed ARSR-4 tower.

=== Air Force squadron and assignments ===
- 666th Aircraft Control and Warning Squadron activated at Mount Tamalpais AFS 27 Nov 1950

Redesignated 666th Radar Squadron (SAGE), 15 January 1961
Redesignated 666th Radar Squadron, 1 February 1974
Inactivated on 30 September 1980
Squadron assignments

- 542d Aircraft Control and Warning Group, 1 January 1951
- 28th Air Division, 6 February 1952
- San Francisco Air Defense Sector, 1 July 1960
- Portland Air Defense Sector, 1 August 1963
- 26th Air Division, 1 April 1966
- 27th Air Division, 15 September 1969
- 26th Air Division, 19 November 1969 - 30 September 1980

=== Ground Equipment Facility ===
On December 23, 1980, the USAF declared full operational capability for the 1st 7 Joint Surveillance System Regional Operations Control Centers, including the ROCC replacing the Mill Valley NCC. After 1980s turnover to the FAA, in "1995 the FAA operated an AN/FPS-66A search set" at J-33. The FAA currently operates an ARSR-4 radar at the site.
