= Hartshorne Woods Park =

County park in New Jersey, United States

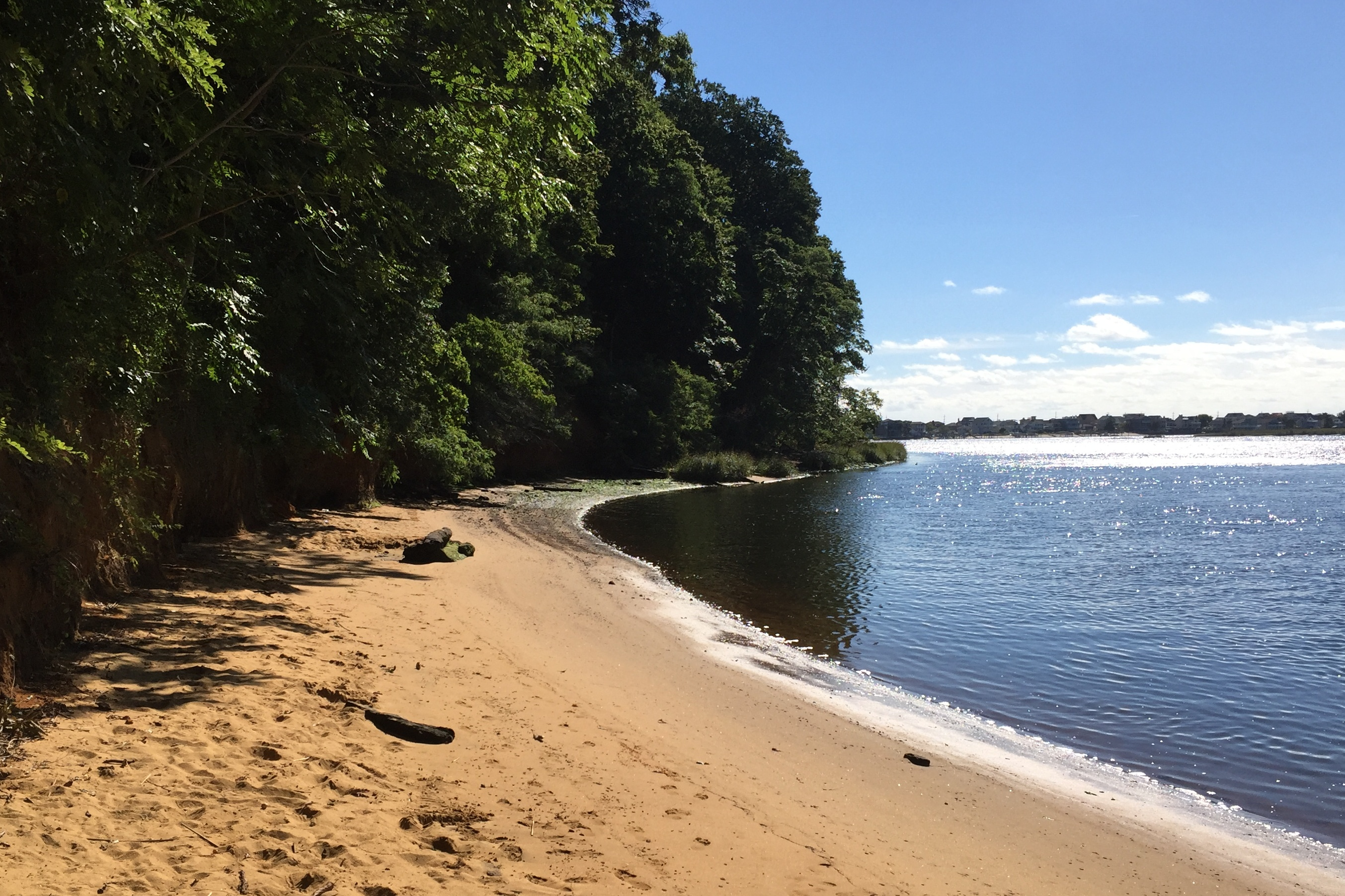
- Black Fish Cove in the Rocky Point Section

- Location within Monmouth County, New Jersey Location within New Jersey Location within the United States
- Type: Public Park
- Coordinates: 40.38967°N 73.98631°W
- Area: 736 acres (298 ha)
- Created: 1974
- Operator: Monmouth County

Hartshorne Woods Park (pronounced: hurt-shern) is a 736-acre (298 ha) county park located in Northern Monmouth County, New Jersey, United States, in New Jersey's Bayshore Region within the towns of Middletown, Locust, Highlands, and Rumson. The park has 16 miles (26 km) of trails, several old military bunkers and a small beach with a fishing pier. It is roughly bordered to the north and west by Navesink Ave and Route 36. Its southern borders are Hartshorne Road and the Navesink River. Its eastern border is the Upper Shrewsbury River. The Park is split into three sections from west to east: The Buttermilk Valley Section, the Monmouth Hills Section, and the Rocky Point Section.

== History ==
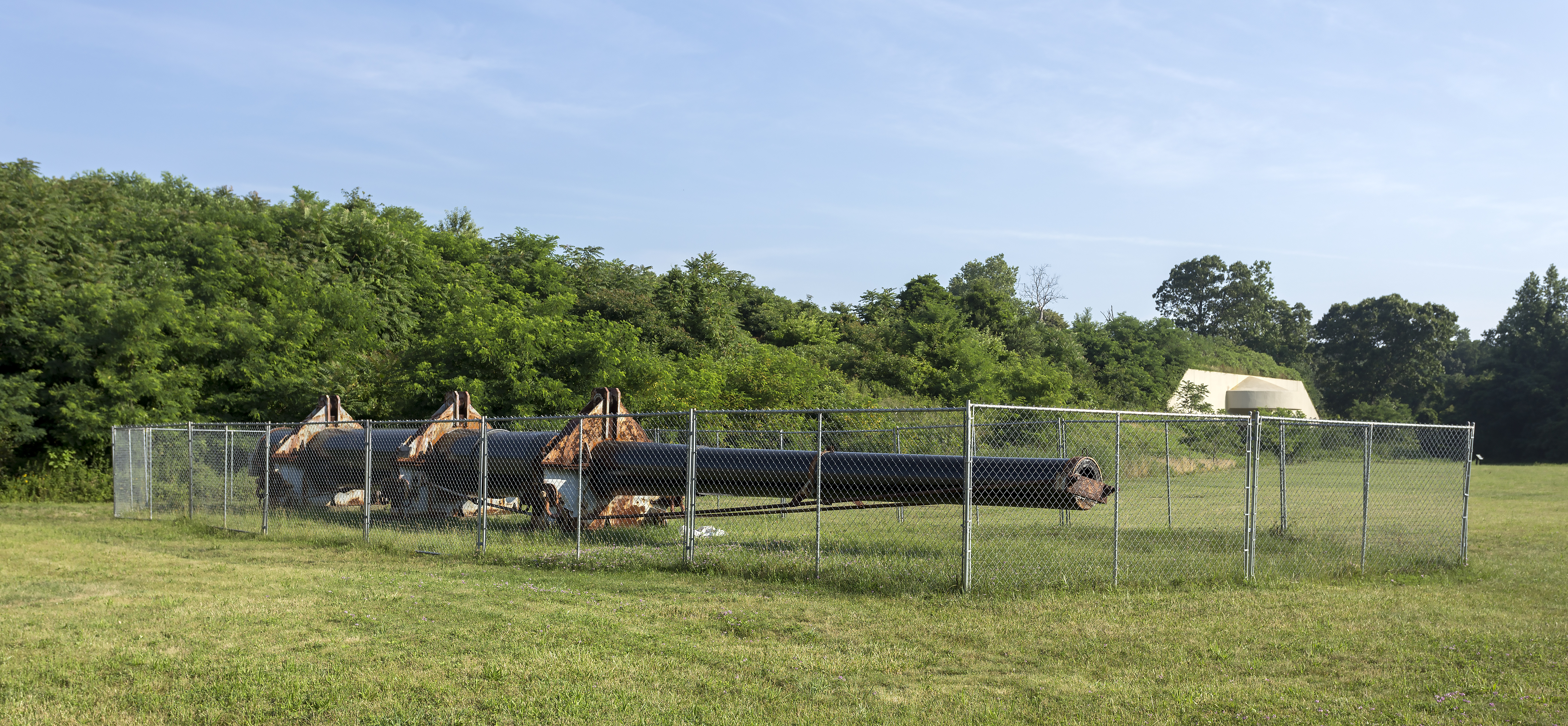
Navy 16-inch Mark 7 gun near Battery Lewis; the weapon has since been moved to one of the casemates.

The park is named after Richard Hartshorne, who acquired the land from the Lenape for thirteen shillings after sailing to the Highland in 1674. Rocky Point, the 224-acre (0.91 km^{2}) easternmost section of the park, contains a World War Two-era Coast Artillery site known as Battery Lewis on the former Highlands Military Reservation (also called Navesink Military Reservation). Later, the Highlands Air Force Station, a long-range air defense radar installation and the Highlands Army Air Defense Site (HAADS) were constructed here. The Air Force closed its installation in 1966. The Army continued to operate HAADS through 1974 to support Nike missile batteries throughout the region, including some which were later revealed by historians at nearby Sandy Hook recreation area to carry nuclear warheads.

In January 2017 a retired US Navy 16"/50 caliber Mark 7 gun, serial number 291, formerly fitted aboard USS New Jersey (BB-62), later retained as a spare for the Iowa-class battleships, was placed on display in one of the gun positions of Battery Lewis.

== Major trails ==
Classification:

- Green Circles indicate: Easy Trails for walking.
- Blue Squares indicate: Moderate Trails for hikers, equestrians and all-terrain bicycles.
- Black Diamonds indicate: Challenging Trails for experienced hikers, equestrians and all-terrain bicyclists.

=== Buttermilk Valley ===
- Kings Hollow Trail- easy loop (0.7 mile)
- Candlestick Trail- easy (1.5 miles) - Navesink Overlook
- Laurel Ridge Trail- moderate loop (2.5 miles)

=== Monmouth Hills ===
- Cuesta Ridge Trail- moderate (1.6 miles)
- Grand Tour Trail- challenging (3.1 miles)

=== Rocky Point ===
- Lewis Overlook- easy loop (0.2 mile) - There is a trail to the top of Battery Lewis with great views.
- Battery Loop- moderate loop (1.3 miles) - Paved surface
- Black Fish Cove- moderate (0.3 mile) - Steep trail to pier
- Command Loop- moderate (0.4 mile) - Paved surface
- Bunker Loop- moderate (0.3 mile)
- Rocky Point Trail- challenging (4.1 miles)
