= Aircraft Warning Corps =

WW2 U.S. Army Air Forces unit

Aircraft Warning Corps insignia

The Aircraft Warning Corps (AWC) was a World War II United States Army Air Force organization for Continental United States air defense. The corps' information centers networked an area's "Army Radar Stations" which communicated radar tracks by telephone, and the information centers also integrated visual reports processed by Ground Observer Corps filter centers. The AWC notified air defense command posts of the First Air Force, Second Air Force, Third Air Force, and Fourth Air Force. These command posts would deploy interceptors which used command guidance to achieve ground-controlled interception.

== Background and deployment ==
United States electronic attack warning began with the 1929 Air Corps "experimenting with a rudimentary early-warning network at Aberdeen Proving Ground" in Maryland, a 1939 networking demonstration at Twin Lights station (New Jersey), and 2 SCR-270 radar stations during the August 1940 "Watertown maneuvers" (New York). When "Pearl Harbor was attacked, [there were 8 CONUS] early-warning stations" (Maine, New Jersey, and 6 in California), and Oahu's Opana Mobile Radar Station had 1 of 6 SCR-270s.

CONUS Army Radar Station deployments after Pearl Harbor were primarily for anti-aircraft coastal defence, e.g., L-1 at Oceanside, California, B-30 at Lompoc, California, and J-23 at Tillamook Head (Seaside, Oregon). California's B-78 Mount Tamalpais Radar Station, subsequently became a Cold War station of the Lashup, Permanent, SAGE, and JSS radar networks. Aircraft Warning Battalions included: 551st at tbd, 555th at tbd, 558th, and 599th (Drew Field, Tampa: 30 March 1944).

== Phaseout ==
The USAAF inactivated the aircraft warning network in April 1944. By June 1944 AWC volunteers "assigned to filter centers serve[d] on the same days that ground observers are on duty" (information centers continued processing radar information 24 hours a day, e.g., plotting radar tracks).

By 1946, post-war considerations were for '"development of radar equipment for detecting and countering missiles of the German A-4 type" (part of Signal Corps' Project 414A contracted to Bell Laboratories in 1945), and by 1947 March Field had one of the remaining World War II AC&W radar stations. The AAF announced in late May 1947 plans to move "its Radar School from Boca Raton, Florida, to Keesler [which] officially opened on 14 November 1947" (originally at Scott Field, then Morrison Field from February to 1 Jun 42). In 1948, the CONUS "five-station radar net" included the Twin Lights established in June 1948 and Montauk's "Air Warning Station #3 on 5 July 1948
