= Arlington Heights Air Force Station =

USAF general surveillance radar station

- Part of Aerospace Defense Command
- Illinois

Site information
- Type: General surveillance radar station

Location
- Coordinates: 42°03′51.5″N 87°59′44″W

Site history
- Built: Gap Filler radar sites (AN/FPS-18)

Garrison information
- Garrison: 755th Radar Squadron

Arlington Heights Air Force Station was a USAF general surveillance radar station 1.8 miles (2.9 km) south-southwest of Arlington Heights, Illinois. It was active from 1960 to 1969.

== Arlington Field ==
Arlington Field opened in 1942 as an auxiliary airfield for the nearby NRAB Chicago. It had a World War II prisoner-of-war camp, opened on 4 May 1945, with 75 German Prisoner of Wars. Project Nike Integrated Fire Control Site C-80 of the 45th Antiaircraft Brigade opened at Arlington Field in 1955, and in January 1960, the 755th Aircraft Control and Warning Squadron transferred to the field from Williams Bay Air Force Station at Elkhorn, Wisconsin, while the co-located Arlington Heights Army Installation was being built for a Project Nike Army Air Defense Command Post.

== Air Force Station ==
Arlington Heights Air Force Station was activated on 1 April 1960, when Williams Bay AFS was redesignated from P-31 to gap-filler RP-31F. In 1962, the station began providing Semi-Automatic Ground Environment radar tracks to Data Center DC-02 at Truax Field, Wisconsin, for the Chicago Air Defense Sector's ground-controlled interception. One of the two Arlington Heights Air Force Station's General Electric AN/FPS-6 Radars height finders was upgraded to the -6B variant and then the -90 variant, and the station's Bendix AN/FPS-20 Radar was also upgraded to an AN/FPS-67. The 755th inactivated on 30 September 1969, and Project Concise ended the site's Nike operations in 1974.

A training center and maintenance building was constructed on the remainder for an Army Reserve Unit of 600 men. At about the same time, the headquarters of 12th Special Forces Group (Army Reserve) was transferred to Arlington Heights.

52 acres (21 ha) was transferred to the city parks district. A golf course was built in May 1979 near the nuclear bunker.

Units of the 12th SFG located at Arlington Heights were disbanded around August 1994. Many of the Reserve Army Special Forces personnel joined the National Guard's 20th Special Forces Group. But after that date, three military units remained still stationed at the site.
