= Highlands Army Air Defense Site =

- New York City, New York Defense Area, New Jersey
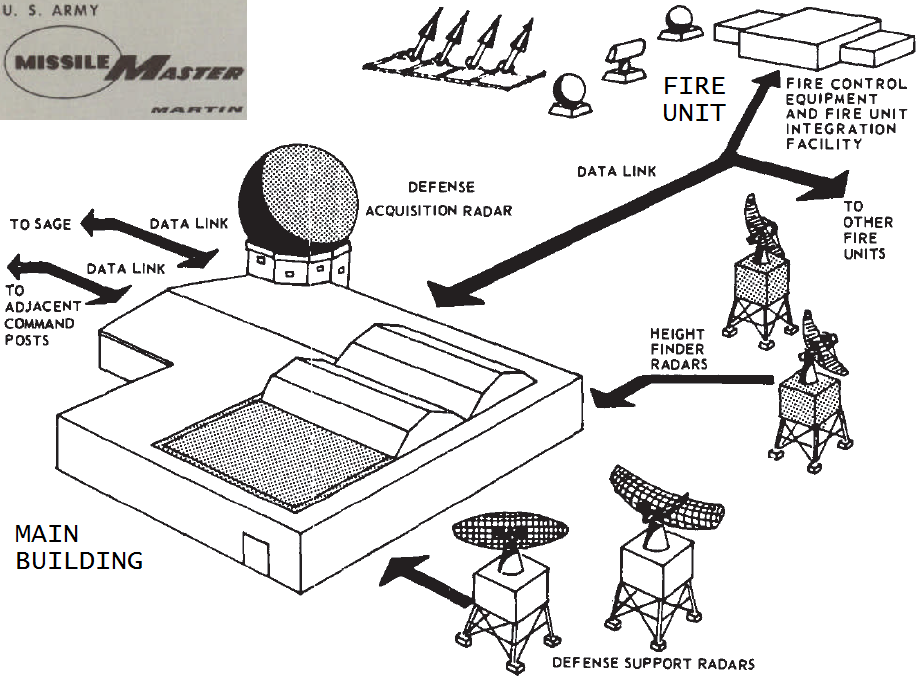
- The AADCP networked local Army radars and Highlands Air Force Station radars to direct Nike fire units--each which had a local network of 3 radars (top) for acquiring the target, tracking the target, and tracking/guiding the Nike missile.

Site information
- Type: Nike missile Army Air Defense Command Post

Location
- Coordinates: 40°23′12″N 73°59′1″W

The Highlands Army Air Defense Site (HAADS) was a United States Army air defence site in Middletown Township, New Jersey.

The Army Air Defense Command Post (AADCP) at Highlands directed the Nike fire units in the New York Defense Area, replacing the Nike missile "manual operations center" at Fort Wadsworth on Staten Island. The Missile Master Army Installation was built in the former Highlands Air Force Station and cost ~$2 million for the new equipment (Martin AN/FSG-1 and AN/FPS-6 & AN/FPS-90 height-finders) and ~$2 million for additional structures such as the 170 ft × 90 ft (52 m × 27 m) nuclear bunker, four radar towers, diesel power plant, and 25 ft × 17 ft (7.6 m × 5.2 m) cinderblock electrical switch building. Isaac Degeneers Construction Co. was the general contractor for the $1.71M construction (C. W. Regan was the lowest bidder at $1.5M). The 1957 site plan was for 45–50 acres (18–20 ha); construction began July 10, 1958; the Missile Master was accepted in May 1960; and the dedication was on June 5.

The Army assumed control of the Highlands Air Force Station after the DoD had announced its closure for July 1966. The 646th Radar Squadron was inactivated on July 1, 1966. The first Hughes AN/TSQ-51 Air Defense Command and Coordination System in the nation as activated at the HAADS. The AADCP became the direction center for the combined New York-Philadelphia Defense Area when the AADCP near Philadelphia was closed in September 1966. AADCP operations ended in 1974 under Project Concise in conjunction with the region's 9 remaining Nike fire units closing in April at Orangeburg/Mount Nebo, New York (NY-03/04), Amityville/Farmingdale, New York (NY-24), Fort Tilden (NY-49), Livingston, New Jersey (NY-79/80), Lumberton, New Jersey (PH-23/25), Erial, New Jersey (PH-41/43), and Woolwich Township, New Jersey (PH-58).

The Highlands Army Air Defense Site was decommissioned on October 31, 1974. The U.S. Department of Agriculture had made plans to put an animal quarantine station on the site in the early 1970s when the Highlands Army Air Defense Site was declared excess by the General Services Administration. The Monmouth County board of Freeholders was opposed to the plan. Representative James J. Howard (D-NJ) was instrumental in getting the Highlands Army Air Defense Site turned into a park in 1973 with the acquisition of 161 acres of the site property. Ten years later the GSA turned 63 acres of the operations area was turned over to the Monmouth County Park System. On July 3, 1984, the Monmouth County Park System signed for the deed to the remaining land.

The Highlands Missile Master building was demolished in 1995.

External images
- 1958 Nike explosion memorial at Highlands (p. 11)
- empty Missile Master bunker in 2008
- map of current site with park trails

== Garrison ==
- 52nd Artillery Brigade (1960–1963, 1967–1973)
- 19th Air Defense Artillery Group (1961–1968)
- Headquarters and Headquarters Battery 1st Battalion, 51st Air Defense Artillery Regiment (1971–1973)
- Headquarters and Headquarters Battery 3rd Battalion, 51st Air Defence Artillery Regiment (1964–1968)
- 16th Air Defense Artillery Group (1971–1974)
