= Sievers Sandberg Reserve Center =

U.S. Army Reserve training installation

- Wilmington, Delaware, Philadelphia Defense Area, New Jersey
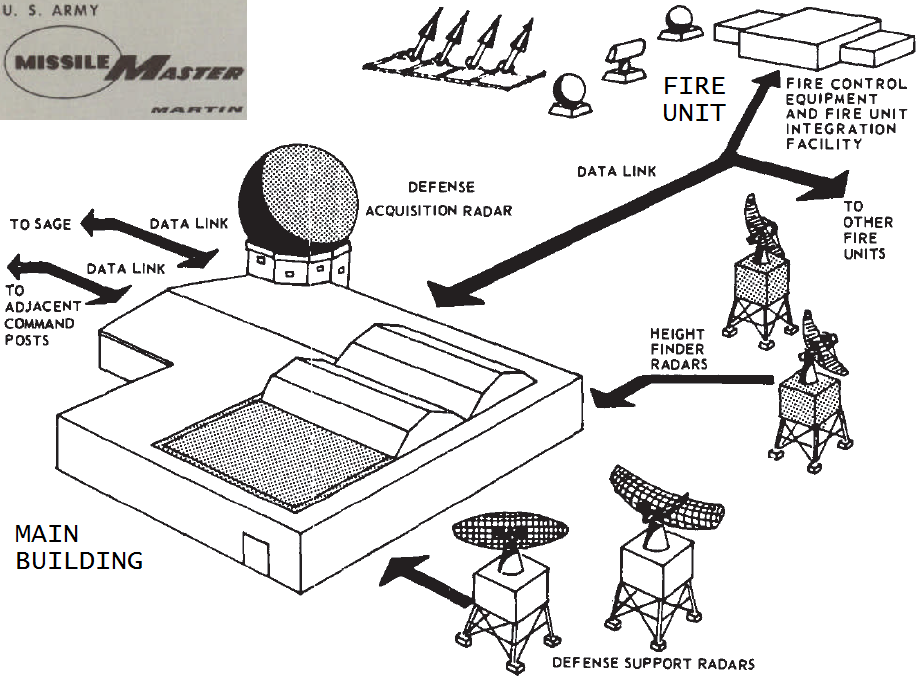
- The Camp Pedricktown command post controlled fire units in the Philadelphia Defense Area.

Site information
- Type: military command and control facility

Location
- Coordinates: 39.753393°N 75.450068°W

Site history
- Built: 1959-60*; September 1966

The Sievers Sandberg Reserve Center is a U.S. Army Reserve training installation in New Jersey. It occupies 39 acres (16 ha).

It was previously Camp Pedricktown an Air Defense Base Construction under the Philadelphia District of the Army Corps of Engineers transferred to the New York District on July 1, 1960. The station had a Missile Master installation with an Army Air Defense Command Post, and associated search, height finder, and identification friend or foe radars. The station's radars were subsequently replaced with radars at Gibbsboro Air Force Station 15 miles (24 km) away. The obsolete Martin AN/FSG-1 Antiaircraft Defense System, a 1957-vintage vacuum tube computer, was removed after command of the defense area was transferred to the command post at Highlands Air Force Station near New York City. The Highlands AFS command post controlled the combined New York-Philadelphia Defense Area.

The air defense station, with an intact bunker was designated an historic site in 1998 by the Salem Historic Preservation Office.

External images
- modern oblique overhead images of bunker
- 1970s ground view of bunker, p. 151
