= Richard Hartshorne (settler) =

American politician and quaker

- Born: 1641; Hathern, Leicestershire, England
- Died: May 22, 1722 (aged 80–81); Middletown, Province of New Jersey
- Occupations: Farmer, politician
- Spouse: Margaret Carr (m. 1670; died 1719)
- Children: 11
- Parent(s): William Hugh Hartshorne; Katherine Roobottom

Richard Hartshorne (/ˈhɑːrtshɔːrn/; 1641 – May 22, 1722) was a Quaker settler and politician who was instrumental in the English settlement of the Navesink Highlands and Sandy Hook in New Jersey. Hartshorne, who farmed nearly 2,400 acres in modern day Middletown and Atlantic Highlands, would also serve in the provincial assembly. Hartshorne's descendants would remain influential in the region, and Hartshorne Woods Park, situated on land acquired by Hartshorne, is named after him.

== Life and career ==
Hartshorne was born in Hathern, Leicestershire in 1641 to William Hugh Hartshorne and Katherine Roobottom. Hartshorne emigrated to Colony of Rhode Island and Providence Plantations in c. 1669, and married Margaret Carr in 1670. Hartshorne hosted Quaker religious leader George Fox in while in Rhode Island.

Motivated by the granting of the Monmouth Tract to Quaker settlers in 1664, Hartshorne settled in what he called "Portland Poynt" in modern day Middletown Township, New Jersey in 1674. Hartshorne purchased land from the neighboring Lenape Navesink people, including Sandy Hook in 1678, in which he was sold "all the liberty of pluming on Sandy Hook, hunting fishing and fowling, getting cannowes upon Sandy Hook or any part of the lands of the new sands". Hartshorne's land holdings eventually grew to nearly 2,400 acres, covering nearly all of Sandy Hook and the Highlands.

Hartshorne served in the provincial assembly, and also wrote a pamphlets promoting the Navesink Highlands for settlement. Hartshorne had eleven children and died in 1722.

== See also ==
- Hartshorne Woods Park
