= Highlands Air Force Station =

Highlands Air Force Station USAF transmitter call sign: "Jitney"
- Part of Air Defense Command

Site information
- Type: General Surveillance Radar Station
- Code: L-12: 1948 Lashup Radar Network; P-9: 1949 ADC permanent network Z-9: 1963 July 31 NORAD network
- Controlled by: United States Air Force

Location
- Coordinates: 40°23′29″N 073°59′38″W

Site history
- In use: 1948-1966

Garrison information
- Past commanders: Major Weston F. Griffith (1955-1961)
- Garrison: 646th AC&W Squadron (1948-1966), 52nd Artillery Brigade (Air Defense) (1960-1963, 1967-1973), 19th Air Defense Artillery Group (1963-1967), 608th Signal Aircraft Warning Battalion (1942-1945)

Highlands Air Force Station was a military installation in Middletown Township near the borough of Highlands, New Jersey. The station provided ground-controlled interception radar coverage as part of the Lashup Radar Network and the Semi-Automatic Ground Environment network, as well as providing radar coverage for the Highlands Army Air Defense Site. The site's 240 acres (97 ha) is now the Rocky Point section in Hartshorne Woods Park of the Monmouth County Parks System.

The Navesink Military Reservation (also called the Highlands Military Reservation) was added as a historic district to the National Register of Historic Places on 13 October 2015.

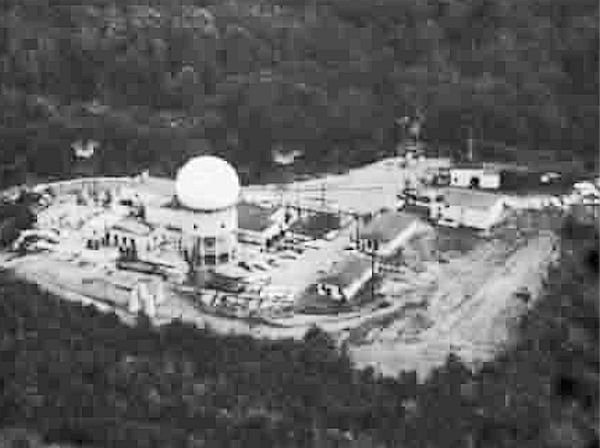
The "base of the 646th [squadron] atop the Highlands-Middletown hill overlooking the Navesink river" (published 7 August 1958).

== History ==
=== Early installations ===
The Navesink Highlands had a sea navigation beacon in 1746, and the first Navesink Twin Lights lighthouse was built in 1828. The current Navesink Twin Lights lighthouse was built in 1862. The Navesink Highlands were used for antebellum flag signaling experiments that communicated with Fort Tompkins on Staten Island in 1859. In 1899 Guglielmo Marconi built a radio station on the hill next to the north tower of the Navesink Twin Lights to report on the America's Cup races off of Sandy Hook.

=== Seacoast defense and 1930s radar testing ===
- Navesink Military Reservation Historic District
- U.S. National Register of Historic Places
- U.S. Historic district
- New Jersey Register of Historic Places
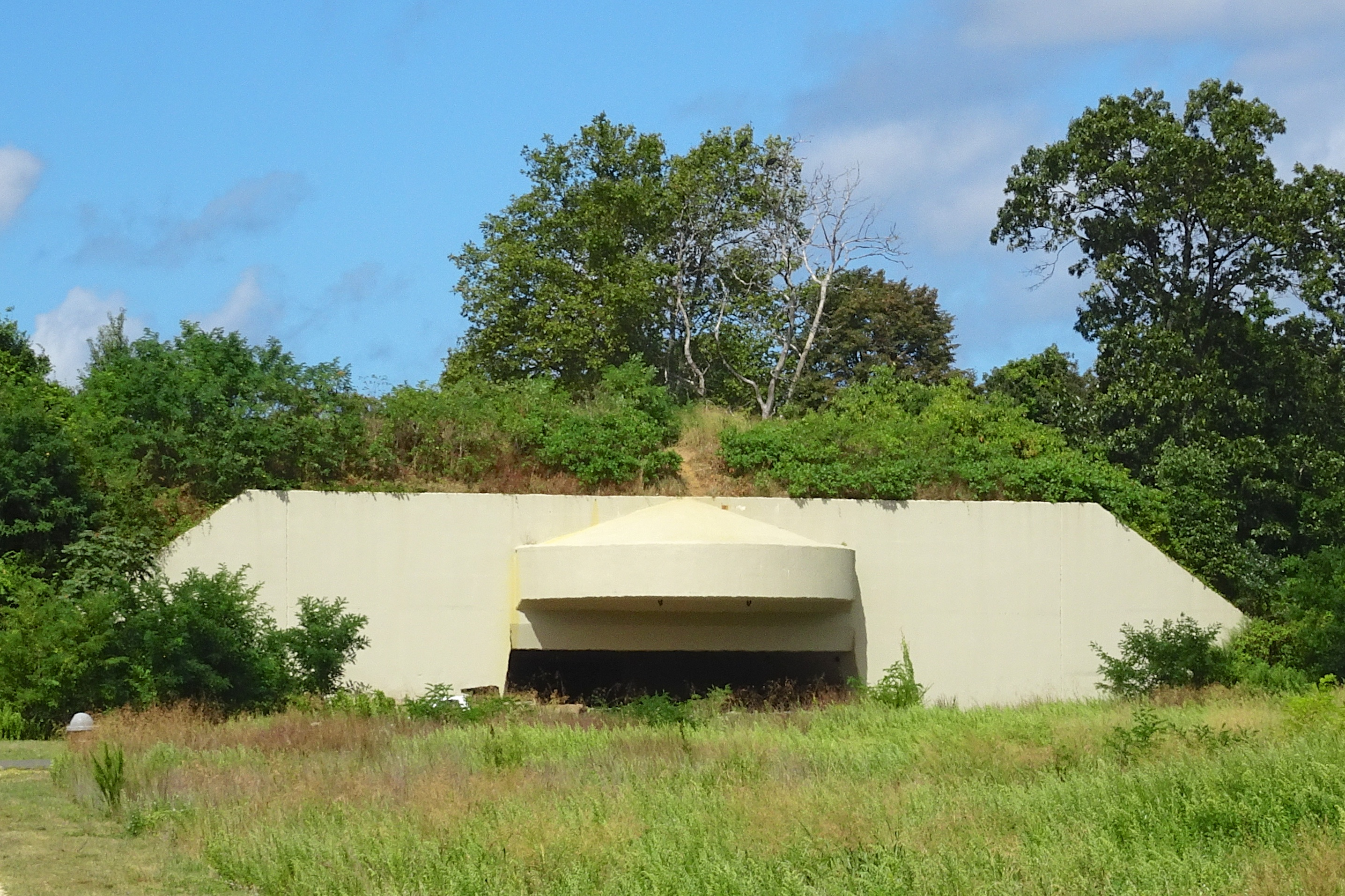
- Battery Lewis - Casemate front

- Location within Monmouth County, New Jersey Location within New Jersey Location within the United States
- Location: Grand Tour Road and Portland Road, Middletown Township, New Jersey
- Coordinates: 40°23′26″N 73°59′20″W
- NRHP reference No.: 15000011
- NJRHP No.: 5389

Significant dates
- Added to NRHP: 13 October 2015
- Designated NJRHP: 28 August 2015

In 1917 during World War I, four 12-inch coast defense mortars were placed on the Navesink Highlands for seacoast defense, transferred from the mortar batteries at Fort Hancock, New Jersey on Sandy Hook. These were called Battery Hartshorne. The battery was named for Richard Hartshorne, a settler who acquired the land in the 1670s. This battery was disarmed in 1920. By 1933, Harold A. Zahl's radio range experiments had begun from the Twin Lights lighthouse, and an August 1935 US Army Signal Corps radar test at the lighthouse allowed a searchlight beam to track an aircraft. An SCR-268 radar assembled in August 1938 was demonstrated at the Twin Lights lighthouse in 1939. In 1942-44 the Navesink (or Highlands) Military Reservation was built, which included Battery Isaac N. Lewis (also called Battery 116), a casemated coastal defense battery of two 16"/50 caliber Mark 2 guns, along with Battery 219, a coastal defense battery of two 6-inch M1903 guns on the hill to the south of the Twin Lights Lighthouse. The batteries were garrisoned by the United States Army Coast Artillery Corps as part of the Harbor Defenses of New York. Battery Lewis was one of the primary batteries guarding Greater New York in World War II, along with another 16-inch battery at Fort Tilden in Queens and two 12-inch long-range batteries at Fort Hancock on Sandy Hook. These rendered all previous heavy guns in the area obsolete, and these were gradually scrapped during the war. After World War II it was determined that gun defenses were obsolete, and the guns at Navesink were scrapped in 1948.

=== Twin Lights station ===
The Twin Lights Aircraft Warning Corps Site 8A was an Army radar site that reported radar data to an Information Filter and Control Center in the New York Telephone building (now the Verizon Building) in New York City during World War II. The station was used for a November 1939 demonstration for the Secretary of War in which radar data was networked from the local SCR-270 radar and, via telephone, from one in Connecticut that both tracked a Mitchel Field B-17 bomber formation. From 1942 to 1945, the site had a World War II Westinghouse SCR-271 radar for early warning. The site was operated by the 608th Signal Aircraft Warning Battalion. Between 1946 and June 1948 the site was operated as a research field station by the Lt. Colonel Paul E. Watson Laboratories in Red Bank, New Jersey. Watson Laboratories set up an experimental model of an AN/CPS-6 Radar which was developed at the end of World War II by M.I.T. After the 1948 Berlin Blockade in Germany, the Cold War was on and with the appearance of the Soviet Tupolev Tu-4 intercontinental bomber in 1947, a major concern of the United States was a possible attack by Soviet long-range bombers. In 1948, the United States Air Force (USAF) directed its Air Defense Command (ADC) to take radar sets out of storage for operation in the Northeastern United States. In June 1948, Air Defense Command activated the 646th Aircraft Control and Warning Squadron at the Twin Light Lashup Site L-12 with the Watson Laboratories General Electric AN/CPS-6 Radar and an AN/TPS-1B radar providing radar data to the Manual Control Center at Roslyn Air Warning Station, New York as part of the Lashup Radar Network. In December 1950, 646th Aircraft Control and Warning Squadron moved from the Twin Lights Lashup site to the Navesink Military Reservation with a new General Electric AN/CPS-6 Radar. In July 1951 the Air Defense Command accepted the new radar and designated the site P-9 as the 9th new Permanent radar site in the nation as part of the Air Defense Command Permanent radar network. In December 1953 the Navesink Military Reservation was renamed to the Highlands Air Force Station. In 1955 a General Electric AN/FPS-8 Radar for medium range surveillance was installed to augment the radar data of the General Electric AN/CPS-6 Radar and was (later converted to a General Electric AN/GPS-3 Radar that remained until 1960.) Nine units of officers housing were built in 1955 near Battery 219. In March 1957 the Highlands Air Force Station began operating the first Bendix AN/FPS-14 Radar in the nation at the radar Gap Filler site P-9A in Gibbsboro, New Jersey until 1960. In 1958, four General Electric AN/FPS-6 Radar were added to the site along with a General Electric AN/FPS-7 Radar.

=== SAGE site ===
In 1958, Highlands Air Force Station began providing data to Semi Automatic Ground Environment (SAGE) Direction Center DC-01 at McGuire AFB which had Air Defense Command interceptor aircraft and CIM-10 Bomarc surface-to-air missiles. In September 1959, the Highlands Air Force Station was the first site in the nation with a General Electric AN/FPS-7 Radar used for long range surveillance for the Martin AN/FSG-1 Antiaircraft Defense System and the Air Force. (The 1262nd U.S. Army Signal Missile Master Support Detachment provided site maintenance to the Martin AN/FSG-1 Antiaircraft Defense System from 1960 to 1966.) The Missile Master at the Highlands Air Force Station was the Army's command post for the New York-Philadelphia Defense Area and was designated as Nike Site NY-55DC and was a NORAD Control Center. It was operated by the 52nd Artillery Brigade (Air Defense). Texas Tower 4 (call sign "Dora") was an offshore radar annex of Highlands Air Force Station operated by a 646th Radar Squadron (SAGE) from 1958 until it collapsed into the Atlantic Ocean on 15 January 1961, killing 28 people. The Highlands Air Force Station had an AN/FRC-56 Tropospheric scatter Communications shore station which communicated with the Texas Tower 4. In 1960 the Air Force installed an AN/FPS-6B height-finder radar at Highlands which, along with the AN/FPS-6, had been replaced by 1963 with AN/FPS-26A and AN/FPS-90 sets. On 31 July 1963 the site was redesignated as NORAD ID Z-9. The United States Secretary of Defense announced on 20 November 1964, that the Air Force operations would be closed.

The Highlands Army Air Defense Site (HAADS) was established in 1966 with the first Hughes AN/TSQ-51 Air Defense Command and Coordination System in the nation. This replaced the Martin AN/FSG-1 Antiaircraft Defense System in the Missile Master nuclear-hardened bunker, which used radar data to guide Nike missiles. HAADS assumed control of the USAF station after the DoD announced its closure for July 1966. The 646th Radar Squadron (SAGE) was inactivated on 1 July 1966. The Army's use of the site ended in 1974 under Project Concise when the Nike missile program ended. Most of the buildings were demolished in the mid-1980s and mid 1990s, and a few building foundations remain in a small clearing within the site's overgrowth of vegetation. However, the concrete remains of Battery Lewis, Battery 219, and the Plotting and Switchboard Bunker still stand.

=== Present ===
The area is now Hartshorne Woods Park. In January 2017 a retired US Navy 16"/50 caliber Mark 7 gun, formerly a spare for the Iowa-class battleships, was placed on display in one of the gun positions of Battery Lewis.

External image
- 1930s radars at the Twin Lights lighthouse
- map of current site with park trails

== See also ==
- Seacoast defense in the United States
- United States Army Coast Artillery Corps

== Bibliography ==
- Berhow, Mark A., ed. (2015). American Seacoast Defenses, A Reference Guide (Third ed.). McLean, Virginia: CDSG Press. ISBN 978-0-9748167-3-9.
- Lewis, Emanuel Raymond (1979). Seacoast Fortifications of the United States. Annapolis: Leeward Publications. ISBN 978-0-929521-11-4.
