= 755th Radar Squadron =

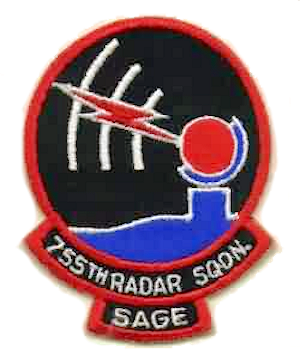
- Emblem of the 755th Radar Squadron
- Active: 1951-1969
- Country: United States
- Branch: United States Air Force
- Type: General Radar Surveillance

The 755th Radar Squadron is an inactive United States Air Force unit. It was last assigned to the 34th Air Division, Aerospace Defense Command, stationed at Arlington Heights Air Force Station, Illinois. It was inactivated on 30 September 1969.

The unit was a General Surveillance Radar squadron providing for the air defense of the United States.

== Lineage ==
- Constituted as the 755th Aircraft Control and Warning Squadron on 14 November 1950

Activated on 27 November 1950
Redesignated 755th Radar Squadron (SAGE), 15 October 1960
Inactivated on 30 September 1969

== Assignments ==
- 541st Aircraft Control and Warning Group, 27 November 1950
- 30th Air Division, 6 February 1952
- 4706th Defense Wing, 16 February 1953
- 37th Air Division, 8 July 1956
- Chicago Air Defense Sector, 1 June 1959
- 20th Air Division, 1 April 1966
- 30th Air Division, 1 December 1967
- 34th Air Division, 1 July 1968 – 30 September 1969

== Stations ==
- Elkhorn, Wisconsin, 1 January 1951

Site redesignated Williams Bay AFS, Wisconsin, 1 December 1953

- Arlington Heights AFS, Illinois, 1 April 1960 - 30 September 1969
