= Williams Bay Air Force Station =

Closed United States Air Force General Surveillance Radar station

Williams Bay Air Force Station
- Part of Air Defense Command (ADC)
- 3.1 miles north of Williams Bay, Wisconsin
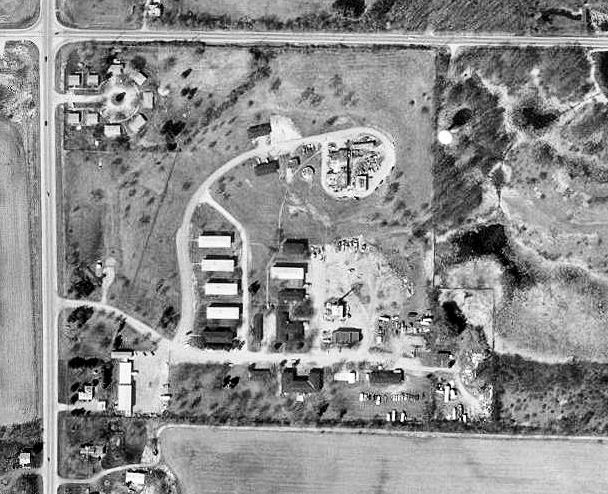
- Williams Bay Air Force Station – 14 Apr 2000

Site information
- Type: Air Force Station
- Controlled by: United States Air Force

Location
- Location of Williams Bay AFS, Wisconsin
- Coordinates: 42°37′01″N 088°32′19″W

Site history
- Built: 1950
- In use: 1950–1960

Garrison information
- Garrison: 755th Aircraft Control and Warning Squadron

Williams Bay Air Force Station (ADC ID: P-31) is a closed United States Air Force General Surveillance Radar station. It is located 3.1 miles (5.0 km) north of Williams Bay, Wisconsin, in the Town of Geneva, Wisconsin. It was closed in 1960.

== History ==
In late 1951 Air Defense Command selected Elkhorn, Wisconsin site as one of twenty-eight radar stations built as part of the second segment of the permanent radar surveillance network. Prompted by the start of the Korean War, on 11 July 1950, the Secretary of the Air Force asked the Secretary of Defense for approval to expedite construction of the second segment of the permanent network. Receiving the Defense Secretary's approval on 21 July, the Air Force directed the Corps of Engineers to proceed with construction.

On 27 November 1950 the 755th Aircraft Control and Warning Squadron began operating a pair of AN/CPS-6B radars at the site, designated LP-31. The site was renamed Williams Bay Air Force Station on 1 December 1953, and initially the station functioned as a Ground-Control Intercept (GCI) and warning station. As a GCI station, the squadron's role was to guide interceptor aircraft toward unidentified intruders picked up on the unit's radar scopes. An AN/FPS-6 height-finder radar was added in 1959.

In addition to the main facility, Williams Bay operated the following AN/FPS-18 Gap Filler sites:

- Monee, IL (RP-31D) 41°24′36″N 087°45′54″W

Williams Bay ceased operations in January 1960 as a budget reduction move, the mission and organization being transferred to the existing United States Army Arlington Heights facility C-80DC for the Nike Missile air-defense system, as part of the Chicago-Gary Defense Area.

Approximately one acre, located in the southwest corner of the Air Force Station property, was retained by the Air Force as a Gap Filler site (RP-31F) for Arlington Heights, although it is unclear if any FPS-18 radars were installed. Most of the station was excessed to the General Service Administration, which sold it to the State of Wisconsin in 1962, and used as a Prisoner Re-Release minimum security prison on the site until 1972. The Gap Filler Annex was declared excess on 4 January 1968, and sold to private ownership on 5 November 1969.

In 1974, the State sold the site to private interests, currently operating it as the Williams Bay Industrial Park, using some of the old USAF buildings. The former family housing units are maintained as private residences. Several auto junkyards are also on the former Air Force property.

There is a small Wisconsin Historical Society Marker on the former air force station honoring the 755th AC&W Squadron.

== See also ==
- United States general surveillance radar stations
