= 646th Radar Squadron =

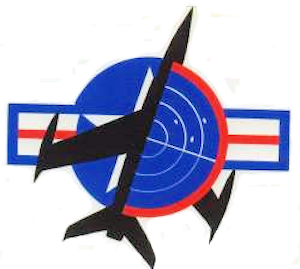
- Emblem of the 646th Radar Squadron
- Active: 1948 June 1-1966 July 1
- Country: United States
- Branch: United States Air Force
- Type: General Radar Surveillance Squadron assigned to: 1948 June 1 -503d Aircraft Warning Group; 1949 December 6 - 503d Aircraft Control and Warning Group; 1952 February 6 - 26th Air Division; 1953 February 16 - 4709th Defense Wing; 1956 October 18 - 4621st Air Defense Wing; 1957 January 8 - New York Air Defense Sector; 1966 April 1 - 21st Air Division

The 646th Aircraft Control and Warning Squadron was the operational USAF unit of Highlands Air Force Station. The unit operated the Texas Tower 4, an offshore radar annex from 1958 until it collapsed into the Atlantic Ocean on 15 January 1961, killing 28 people. The squadron was activated on 1 June 1948 and renamed to the 646th Radar Squadron (SAGE) on 1 October 1958.

The Highlands AFS site was closed altogether in 1974.
