= AN/CPS-6 Radar =

1940s American air defense radar

AN/CPS-6
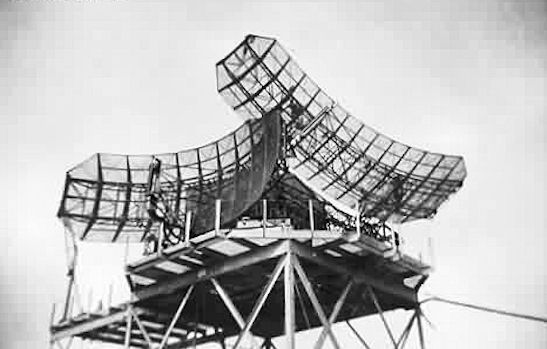
- AN/CPS-6 Radar
- Country of origin: United States
- Manufacturer: General Electric
- Introduced: 1945
- Type: Medium-range search/height finder
- Frequency: S-band 2.7–3.01 GHz (111–100 mm)
- Pulsewidth: 0.5 μs
- Range: 165 mi (266 km)
- Altitude: 45,000 ft (14,000 m)
- Power: 40 kw
- Other names: Minnie
- Related: AN/CPS-6, 6A, 6B, AN/FPS-10

The AN/CPS-6 was an S-band medium-range search/height finder radar used by the United States Air Force Air Defense Command. The radar was developed during the later stages of World War II by the MIT Radiation Laboratory with the first units produced by General Electric in mid-1945.

In accordance with the Joint Electronics Type Designation System (JETDS), the "AN/CPS-6" designation represents the 6th design of an Army-Navy air transportable electronic device for search radar equipment. The JETDS system also now is used to name all Department of Defense electronic systems.

== Development ==
Subsequent development of the AN/CPS-6A and AN/CPS-6B models saw them produced at a plant in Syracuse, New York. The radar set consisted of two antennae, with one slanted at a 45-degree angle providing the height-finder capability. Designed to detect fighter aircraft at a range of 100 miles (160 km) and a height of up to 16,000 feet (4,900 m), the radar utilized five transmitters operating at S-band frequencies ranging between 2.700–3.019 GHz (111.0–99.3 mm). It required twenty-five people to operate the radar.

== History ==
In 1949, an AN/CPS-6 radar was installed as part of the Lashup Radar Network at Twin Lights, New Jersey, proving capable of detecting targets at ranges of 84 miles (135 km). The first units of the follow-on AN/CPS-6B, ready for installation by mid-1950, saw fourteen of these assigned within the first permanent Lashup network.

A component designed to improve the radar's range was added in 1954. Tests showed the 6B-model had a range of 165 miles (266 km) with an altitude limit of 45,000 feet (14,000 m). A single radar unit with its ancillary electronic equipment required eighty-five freight cars for transport. The Air Force phased out the 6B-model between mid-1957 and mid-1959.

Another radar, developed from the CPS-6, was the AN/FPS-10. It was essentially a stripped-down version of the AN/CPS-6B. Thirteen of these units served within the first permanent Lashup network.

== See also ==
- List of radars
- List of military electronics of the United States

== Bibliography ==
- Avionics Department (July 20, 2013), "Missile and Electronic Equipment Designations", Electronic Warfare & Radar Systems Engineering Handbook (4 ed.), Point Mugu, California: Lulu Press, Inc, ISBN 9781782665243
- Winkler, David F. (June 1997), Searching the Skies: The Legacy of the United States Cold War Defense Radar Program (PDF), Langley AFB, Virginia: Headquarters Air Combat Command, ISBN 9781907521911, LCCN 97020912
