= Project Concise =

Project Concise was a United States Army program to close military installations after the Vietnam War. The closures included Nike missile launch sites and command posts including Highlands Army Air Defense Site, Fort Lawton, Fort MacArthur, Fort Hancock, Charleston Army Depot, Fort Wolters, and Valley Forge General Hospital. Additionally, Hunter Army Airfield was reactivated in order to accommodate the expected increase in traffic at Fort Stewart and Fort Hunter.

The project commenced with a May 1972-autumn 1973 study that identified numerous posts which were instead retained (e.g., Fort McClellan, instead closed in 1999), and the closures were announced on November 22, 1974. A follow-up program of realignments was announced in 1976.
