= Ground Equipment Facility =

A Ground Equipment Facility of the Federal Aviation Administration (FAA) is a radar station or other designated Air Traffic Control site of the United States. Several of the facilities originated as Cold War SAGE radar stations, including some facilities of the joint-use site system (JUSS) (e.g., San Pedro Hill Air Force Station provided radar tracks for both the Army and USAF). The USAF declared full operational capability of the 1st 7 Regional Operational Control Centers (ROCCs) on December 23, 1980.

JSS Ground Equipment Facilities
IDs	Landform (former military site)	ST	Coordinates	initial year	FAA year	Inactivated
J-12 (Z-249)	Dauphin Island (Dauphin Island AFS)	AL	30°15′01″N 088°04′42″W	1959	1980	tbd
J-31 (Z-39)	San Pedro Hill (San Pedro Hill AFS)	CA	33°44′45″N 118°20′10″W	1961	1997	n/a
J-33 (Z-38)	tbd (Mill Valley AFS)	CA	37°55′26″N 122°35′49″W	1951	1980	
J-34 (Z-37)	tbd (Point Arena AFS)	CA	38°53′23″N 123°33′01″W	1951	tbd	1998
J-36A	San Clemente Island (San Clemente Island AFS)	CA		1952	c. 1998	
tbd (DC-21DC)	Grovers Cliff (Fort Heath)	CA	42°23′19.5″N 070°58′10″W	1959	1969	mid-to-late 1990s
tbd (Z-10)	tbd (North Truro AFS)	MA	42°02′03″N 070°03′15″W	1951	1995	tbd
