= AN/MSQ-51 =

The Reeves AN/MSQ-51 Aerial Target Control Central (ATCC) was a combination radar/computer/communications system ("Q" system") developed 1961-3 for United States Navy "aerial target out-of-sight control". In addition to the "Target Control System AN/SRW-4D" with radios and "Antenna Assemblies for Target Control and Communications (7 Units)", the ATCC included acquisition/surveillance and tracking radars, a Mark X IFF/SIF, and an analog computer. The ATCC's automatic tracking radar was derived from the Western Electric M-33 gun laying radar and could process double-pulse 9340-9370 MHz beacon returns from transponders up to 400,000 yd (200 nmi; 370 km) away from the AN/MSQ-51 transmitting 9215-9285 MHz radar pulses. If an ATCC was equipped with a "Telemetry Receiving Station", IRIG channels 5-14 could also be received from QF-9G and Q-2C unmanned aerial vehicles. Other ATCC-controlled drones included the QF-9F, KDA-1, KDA-4, KDB-1 and KD2R-5. For "RF communications (2 to 25 mc.)" to command the drone was a "Collins Radio Co. Model 618T-3" Single Sideband Transceiver (SST) with Control Unit 714E-2 for 28,000 channels (400 watts PEP, 100 w AM). The 1000 watt voice radio system had 2 UHF AN/GRC-27 sets "with Control-Indicator 6-806/GR" for 1750 channels (consoles had headsets, footpedals, and crew intercommunications.)

In accordance with the Joint Electronics Type Designation System (JETDS), the "AN/MSQ-51" designation represents the 51st design of an Army-Navy electronic device for ground mobile special combination equipment. The JETDS system also now is used to name all Department of Defense electronic systems.

== Configuration ==
Similar to the USMC's post-WWII AN/TPQ-2 and Korean War AN/MPQ-14, the AN/MSQ-51 used a 38 ft (12 m) Operations Trailer, a 30.6 ft (9.3 m) flatbed trailer with Electric Generator units, and a 19.2 ft (5.9 m) Maintenance Trailer. An additional flatbed was used for transporting the 2,343 lb (1,063 kg) acquisition (surveillance) antenna assembly which included a 16' oblong dish and a ground pedestal. When emplaced, the "Operations Trailer Assembly" was the box-style fifth wheel trailer with antennas on top (tracking antenna with vertically polarized lens and conical scan, two AT-781/AU voice communications antennas, and two AT-197/GR telemetry antennas), a combination air conditioning and electric heating system, and interior operator equipment:

- Tracking Console with Plan Position Indicator (PPI), A-scans for range/azimuth/elevation, AN/TPA-3 IFF/SIF electronics (e.g., Video Decoder MX1995 & Remote Switching Control C-1903), and for the surveillance antenna signal, "Acquisition Receiver Control" panel.
- Tactical Control Console, a "Modified M33 Unit", with vertical 30" plotting board, command signal Transmitter Control C-2802/SRW-4, Thirty Channel Event Recorder ("on-off"/"Beep" type) and an additional PPI.
- Computer cabinet with vacuum tube amplifiers for analog summing, Horizontal Range Servo for trigonometric, and mounted on the right cabinet door a Command Monitor Display Panel along with Telemetry Indicators (if equipped).

As with the M-33's computation of an enemy aircraft location, the AN/MSQ-51 computer derived "target altitude" from the elevation resolver, timed the "rate of change of altitude" using a differentiating amplifier, and "resolved horizontal plane coordinates" from the antenna's azimuth orientation.

== Personnel ==
To "permit one man [tracking] operation instead of three", the M-33 tracking console was modified for the AN/MSQ-51's "Tracking Radar Operator", and the remainder of the 4 man ATCC operations crew was a "Surveillance Radar Operator" and 2 Drone Controllers with the primary in the Operations Trailer. The "Secondary Operator's Position [was] located outside the van", and a "telemetry directional helical receiving antenna...on top of a mast ten feet high [was] 100 feet from the operating van." ATCC maintenance was by 6 radar technicians, 4 AN/SRW-4D technicians, and 4 for HVAC, generators, and accessories.

At the China Lake "Target Radar Site", Reeves Instrument Corporation representative was an AN/MSQ-51 civilian contractor until ~1968.

== See also ==
- List of radars
- List of military electronics of the United States
