= Edward O'Hare =

US Navy Medal of Honor recipient (1914–1943)

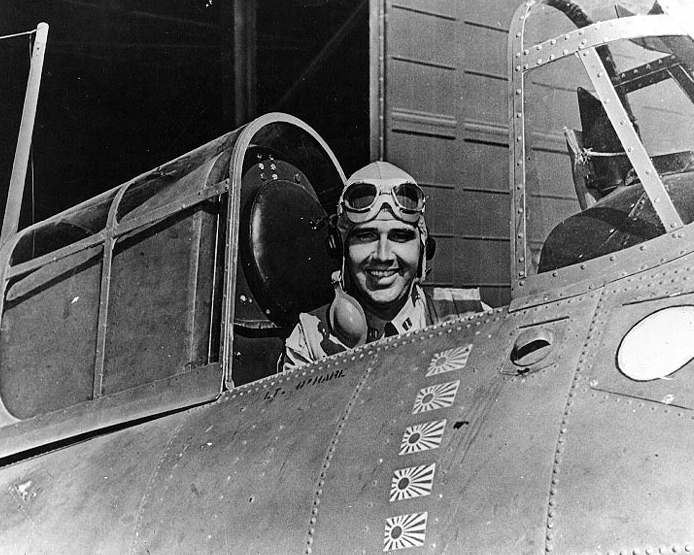
- Lieutenant Edward "Butch" O'Hare in a Grumman F4F-3 Wildcat. The wartime censor has blanked out the famous "Felix the Cat" squadron insignia on this photo (colorized photo).
- Born: March 13, 1914; St. Louis, Missouri, U.S.
- Died: November 26, 1943 (aged 29); Near the Gilbert Islands †
- Education: United States Naval Academy
- Military career
- Allegiance: United States
- Branch: United States Navy
- Service years: 1937–1943
- Rank: Lieutenant commander
- Nickname: "Butch"
- Commands: Fighting 3 (VF-3), Air Group 6
- Conflicts: World War II: Pacific War; Action off Bougainville
- Awards: Medal of Honor; Navy Cross; Distinguished Flying Cross (2); Purple Heart

Lieutenant Commander Edward Henry O'Hare (March 13, 1914 – November 26, 1943) was an American naval aviator of the United States Navy, who on February 20, 1942, became the Navy's first fighter ace of the war when he single-handedly attacked a formation of nine medium bombers approaching his aircraft carrier. Although he had a limited amount of ammunition, O'Hare was credited with shooting down five enemy bombers and became the first naval aviator recipient of the Medal of Honor in World War II.

O'Hare's final action took place on the night of November 26, 1943, while he was leading the U.S. Navy's first-ever nighttime fighter attack launched from an aircraft carrier. During this encounter with a group of Japanese torpedo bombers, O'Hare's Grumman F6F Hellcat was shot down; his aircraft was never found. A radio message was sent out, but there was no response. In 1945, the U.S. Navy destroyer USS O'Hare (DD-889) was named in his honor.

On September 19, 1949, the Chicago-area Orchard Field Airport was renamed O'Hare International Airport, six years after O'Hare perished. An F4F Wildcat, in a livery identical to the aircraft ("White F-15") flown by O'Hare, is on display in Terminal 2. The display was formally opened on the seventy-fifth anniversary of his Medal of Honor flight.

== Early life ==
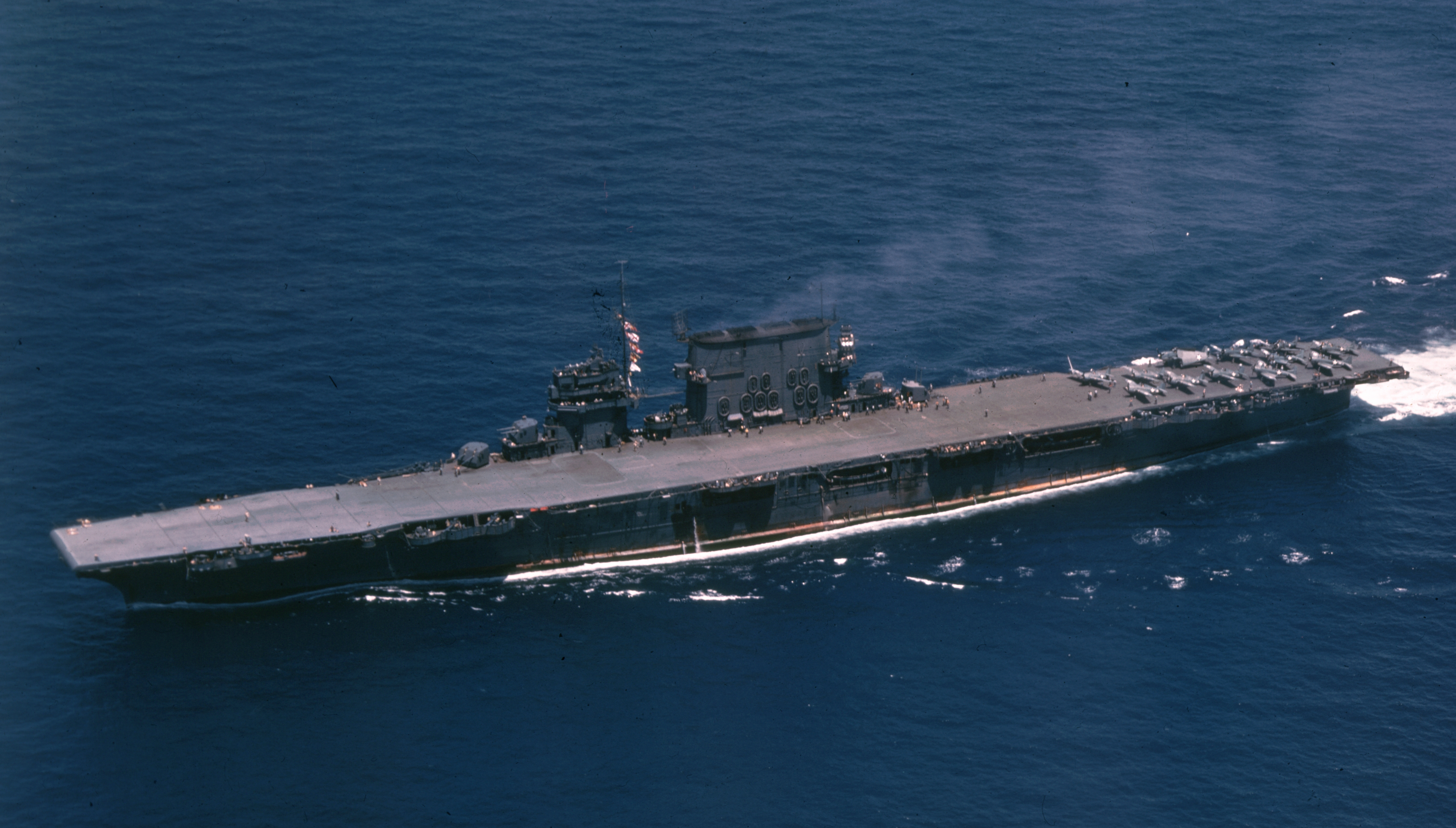
The aircraft carrier USS Saratoga

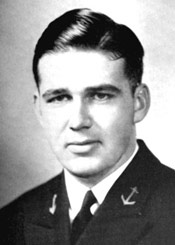
O'Hare as 2/C midshipman at the Naval Academy, 1935

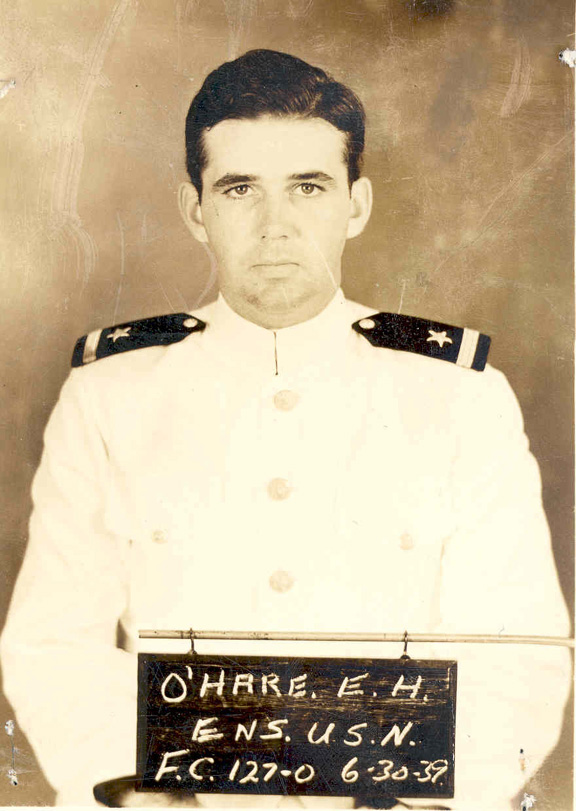
Ensign O'Hare

Edward Henry "Butch" O'Hare was born in St. Louis, Missouri, the son of Selma Anna (Lauth) and Edward Joseph O'Hare. He was of Irish and German descent. Butch had two sisters, Patricia and Marilyn. When their parents divorced in 1927, Butch and his sisters stayed with Selma in St. Louis while Edward moved to Chicago. Butch's father was a lawyer who worked closely with Al Capone before turning against him and helping convict Capone of tax evasion.

Butch O'Hare graduated from the Western Military Academy in 1932. The following year, he went on to the United States Naval Academy at Annapolis, Maryland. After O'Hare graduated and was commissioned as an ensign on June 3, 1937, he served two years on the battleship USS New Mexico. In 1939, O'Hare started flight training at NAS Pensacola in Florida, flying the Naval Aircraft Factory N3N-1 "Yellow Peril" and Stearman NS-1 biplane trainers, and later the advanced SNJ trainer. On the nimble Boeing F4B-4A, he trained in aerobatics as well as aerial gunnery. O'Hare also flew the SBU Corsair and the TBD Devastator.

In November 1939, O'Hare's father was shot and killed, most likely by Al Capone's gunmen. During Capone's tax evasion trial in 1931 and 1932, Edward O'Hare had provided incriminating evidence which helped finally put Capone away. There is speculation that this was done to ensure that Butch got into the Naval Academy, or to set a good example; it certainly at least partly involved an attempt to distance himself from Capone's activities. Whatever the motivation, the elder O'Hare was shot and killed while driving his car a week before Capone was released from incarceration.

When Butch finished his naval aviation training on May 2, 1940, he was assigned to Fighter Squadron Three (VF-3) on board USS Saratoga. O'Hare then trained on the Grumman F3F and then graduated to the Brewster F2A Buffalo. Lieutenant John Thach, then executive officer of VF-3, discovered O'Hare's exceptional flying abilities and closely mentored the promising young pilot. Thach, who would later develop the Thach Weave aerial combat tactic, emphasized gunnery in his training. In 1941, more than half of all VF-3 pilots, including O'Hare, earned the "E" for gunnery excellence.

In early 1941, VF-3 transferred to USS Enterprise (CV-6), while carrier Saratoga underwent maintenance and overhaul work at Bremerton Navy Yard.

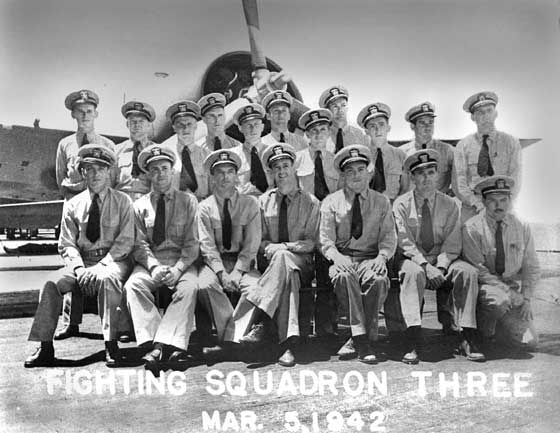
VF-3: Front row, second from right: Lt. Edward Butch O'Hare

On Monday morning, July 21, O'Hare made his first flight in a Grumman F4F Wildcat. Following stops in Washington and Dayton, he landed in St. Louis the next day. Visiting the wife of a friend in hospital that afternoon, O'Hare met his future wife, nurse Rita Wooster, proposing to her the first time they met. After O'Hare took instruction in Roman Catholicism to convert, he and Rita married in St. Mary's Catholic Church in Phoenix on Saturday, September 6, 1941. For their honeymoon, they sailed to Hawaii on separate ships, Butch on Saratoga, which had completed modifications at Bremerton, and Rita on the Matson liner Lurline. Butch was called to duty the day after the Japanese attacked Pearl Harbor.

On Sunday evening, January 11, 1942, as Butch and other VF-3 officers ate dinner in the wardroom, the carrier Saratoga was damaged by a Japanese torpedo hit while patrolling southwest of Hawaii. She spent five months in repair on the west coast, so VF-3 squadron transferred to the USS Lexington on January 31.

== World War II service ==
=== Medal of Honor flight ===
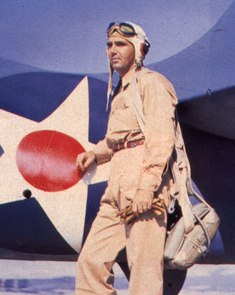
O'Hare stands beside an F4F-3 Wildcat (note leather cowboy belt instead of GI standard issue tan military web belt).

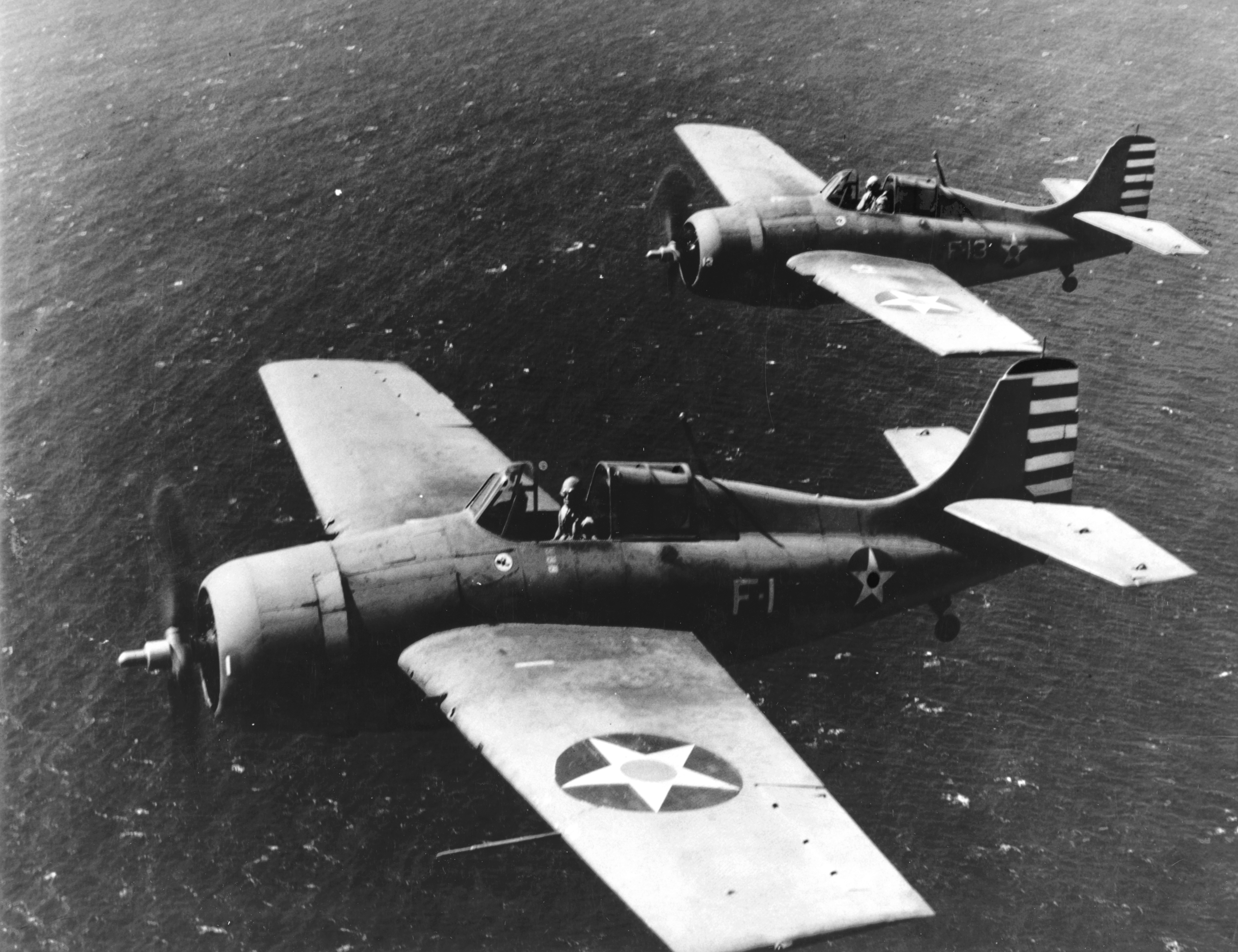
F4F-3A Wildcats flown by LCDR. John Thach (F-1) and Lt. O'Hare (F-13) during the aerial photography flight of April 11, 1942.

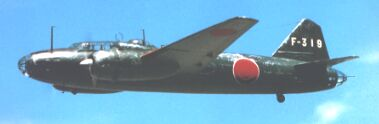
Mitsubishi G4M "Betty"

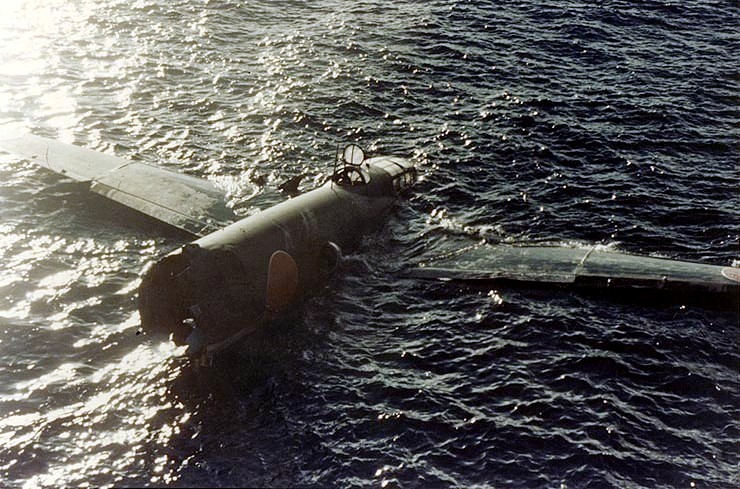
Photo (taken later in the war) of a shot down Mitsubishi G4M1 "Betty", the same type of Japanese bomber Lt. O'Hare intercepted on the 20th

O'Hare's most famous flight occurred during the Pacific War on February 20, 1942. He and his wingman were the only U.S. Navy fighters available when a second wave of Japanese bombers were attacking his aircraft carrier Lexington.

O'Hare was on board the aircraft carrier Lexington, which had been assigned the task of penetrating enemy-held waters north of New Ireland. While still 450 miles (720 km) from the harbor at Rabaul, at 10:15, the Lexington picked up an unknown aircraft on radar 35 miles (56 km) from the ship. A six-plane combat patrol was launched, two fighters being directed to investigate the contact. These two planes, under command of LCDR. John Thach, shot down a four-engined Kawanishi H6K4 Type 97 ("Mavis") flying boat about 43 miles (69 km) out at 11:12. Later two other planes of the combat patrol were sent to another radar contact 35 miles (56 km) ahead, shooting down a second "Mavis" at 12:02. A third contact was made 80 miles (130 km) out, but reversed course and disappeared. At 15:42, a jagged vee signal drew the attention of the Lexington's radar operator. The contact then was lost but reappeared at 16:25 47 miles (76 km) west. O'Hare, flying F4F Wildcat BuNo 4031 "White F-15", was one of several pilots launched to intercept nine Japanese Mitsubishi G4M "Betty" bombers from the 4th Kōkūtai's 2nd Chutai. O'Hare's squadmates shot down eight bombers (with the ninth falling to an SBD later), but he and his wingman, Marion "Duff" Dufilho, were held back in the event of a second attack.

At 16:49, the Lexington's radar picked up a second formation of "Bettys" from the 4th Kōkūtai's 1st Chutai, only 12 miles (19 km) out, on the disengaged side of the task force. With the majority of VF-3 still chasing the 2nd Chutai, only O'Hare and Dufilho were available to intercept. Flying eastward they arrived 1,500 feet (460 m) above the "Bettys" 9 miles (14 km) out at 17:00. Dufilho's guns jammed, leaving only O'Hare to protect the carrier. The enemy was in a V-of-Vs formation, flying very close together and using their rear-facing 20mm cannon for mutual protection. O'Hare's Wildcat was armed with four 50-caliber guns, with 450 rounds per gun, giving him about 10 three-second bursts.

O'Hare's initial maneuver was a high-side diving attack from the formation's starboard side employing deflection shooting. He managed to hit the outside "Betty"'s right engine and wing fuel tanks; when the stricken craft of Petty Officer 2nd Class Ryosuke Kogiku (3rd Shotai) abruptly lurched to starboard, he switched to the next plane up the line, that of Petty Officer 1st Class Koji Maeda (3rd Shotai leader). Maeda's plane caught fire, but his crew managed to put out the flames with "one single spurt of liquid ... from the fire-extinguisher" Both Maeda and Kogiku would catch up with the group before bomb release.

With two "Bettys" out of formation (albeit temporarily), O'Hare began his second firing pass, this time from the port side. His first target was the outside plane, flown by Petty Officer 1st Class Bin Mori (2nd Shotai). O'Hare's bullets damaged the right engine and left fuel tank, forcing Mori to dump his bombs and abort his mission. O'Hare then targeted the plane of Petty Officer 1st Class Susumu Uchiyama (1st Shotai), which became his first definite kill.

As O'Hare began his third firing pass, again from the port side, the remaining "Bettys" were nearing their bomb release point. First, O'Hare shot down Lieutenant (junior grade) Akira Mitani (2nd Shotai leader). This left the lead plane, commanded by Lieutenant Commander Takuzo Ito, exposed. O'Hare's concentrated fire caused the plane's port engine nacelle to break free from its mountings and fall from the plane. The resulting explosion was so violent that the 1st Chutai pilots were convinced that an anti-aircraft burst had struck their commander's plane. With a gaping hole in its left wing, Ito's plane fell out of formation.

Shortly afterwards, O'Hare made a fourth firing pass, likely against Maeda (who had now caught up), but ran out of ammunition. Frustrated, he pulled away to allow the ships to fire their anti-aircraft guns. The four surviving bombers dropped their ordnance, but all their 250 kg bombs missed. O'Hare believed he had shot down six bombers and damaged a seventh. Captain Sherman would later reduce this to five, as four of the reported nine bombers were still overhead when he pulled off. Thach, hurrying towards the scene with reinforcements after mopping up the 2nd Chûtai, saw three enemy bombers falling in flames at the same time.

In fact, O'Hare destroyed only three "Bettys": Uchiyama's, Mitani's, and Ito's. The last plane, however, was not yet finished. Ito's command pilot, Warrant Officer Chuzo Watanabe, (Note: Group leader Takuzo Ito was not piloting his own "Betty". As per standard practice in the IJNAF, the pilot was an enlisted man, and the commander of the plane was an observer and/or navigator.) regained enough control to level his damaged plane and attempted to crash it into Lexington. He missed, and flew into the water near the carrier at 17:12. Another three "Bettys" were damaged by O'Hare's attacks. Of these, Maeda and Kogiku safely landed at Vunakanau airdrome at 19:50, while Mori became lost in a storm and eventually ditched at Simpson Harbor at 20:10.

With his ammunition expended, O'Hare returned to his carrier, and was fired on accidentally but with no effect by a .50-caliber machine gun from the Lexington. O'Hare's fighter had, in fact, been hit by only one bullet during his flight, the single bullet hole in F-15's port wing disabling the airspeed indicator. According to Thach, O'Hare then approached the gun platform to calmly say to the embarrassed anti-aircraft gunner who had fired at him, "Son, if you don't stop shooting at me when I've got my wheels down, I'm going to have to report you to the gunnery officer."

In the opinion of Admiral Brown and of Captain Frederick C. Sherman, commanding the Lexington, Lieutenant O'Hare's actions may have saved the carrier from serious damage or even loss. By 19:00 all Lexington planes had been recovered except for two F4F-3 Wildcats shot down while attacking enemy bombers; both were lost while making steady, no-deflection runs from astern of their targets. The pilot of one fighter was rescued, the other went down with his aircraft.

The F4F Wildcat O'Hare flew was BuNo. 4031 as discovered in his aviator’s logbook, while its side number was found out to be F-15 based on Captain Burt Stanley's diary. After Lexington returned to port, 4031 was transferred to VF-2 and flew from Lexington at Coral Sea. It was one of the six VF-2 Wildcats to survive Lexington‘s sinking, as it landed on Yorktown. After Coral Sea, it served in VF-42 and later Marine Air Group 23 before being struck off charge in July 1944.

=== Accolades ===
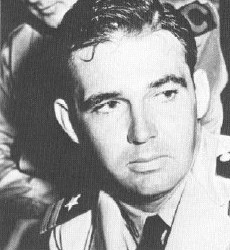
LT Edward O'Hare at press conference with LCDR John Thach and reporters at the Royal Hawaiian Hotel on March 26, 1942

On March 26, O'Hare was greeted at Pearl Harbor by a horde of reporters and radio announcers. During a radio broadcast in Honolulu, he enjoyed the opportunity to say hello to his wife Rita ("Here's a great big radio hug, the best I can do under the circumstances") and to his mother ("Love from me to you"). On April 8, he thanked the Grumman Aircraft Corporation plant at Bethpage (where the F4F Wildcat was made) for 1,150 cartons of Lucky Strike cigarettes, a grand total of 230,000 smokes. Ecstatic Grumman workers had passed the hat to buy the cigarettes in appreciation of O'Hare's combat victories in one of their F4F Wildcats. A loyal Camel smoker, O'Hare opened a carton, deciding that it was the least he could do for the good people back in Bethpage. In his letter to the Grumman employees he wrote, "You build them, we'll fly them and between us, we can't be beaten." It was a sentiment he would voice often in the following two months.

Credited with shooting down five bombers, O'Hare became a flying ace, was selected for promotion to lieutenant commander, and became the first naval aviator to receive the Medal of Honor. With President Franklin D. Roosevelt looking on, O'Hare's wife Rita placed the Medal around his neck. After receiving the Medal of Honor, then-Lieutenant O'Hare was described as "modest, inarticulate, humorous, terribly nice and more than a little embarrassed by the whole thing".

O'Hare received further decorations later in 1943 for actions in battles near Marcus Island in August and subsequent missions near Wake Island in October.

=== Non-combat duty ===
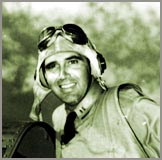
Publicity shot of O'Hare, wearing tie and life vest, standing in the cockpit of a Grumman F4F-3 Wildcat (different version of photo)

O'Hare was not employed on combat duty from early 1942 until late 1943. Important events in this period included flying an F4F-3A Wildcat (BuNo 3986 "White F-13") as Lieutenant Commander 'Jimmy' Thach's wingman for publicity footage on April 11, 1942, the Medal of Honor presentation at the White House on April 21, and the welcome parade in O'Hare's hometown on Saturday, April 25, 1942.

The welcome parade was held in St. Louis. At the starting point, O'Hare, wearing the blue-ribboned Medal of Honor around his neck, was guided to the back seat of a black open Packard Phaeton, where he sat between his wife Rita and his mother Selma. The parade began at noon, led by a police motorcycle escort, then came the band from Jefferson Barracks, marching veterans, a truck packed with photographers, O'Hare's Phaeton (with a six-man Marine honor guard alongside) and other open cars. Bringing up the rear was the entire 350-member student body of Western Military Academy. St. Louis Mayor William Dee Becker presented O'Hare with a gold navigator's four-dial watch engraved with the words "To Lt. Commander Edward H. O'Hare, USN, from a proud and grateful City of St. Louis, April 25, 1942". As O'Hare's mother and his sisters clipped newspaper stories and photos the following days, his place in history began to dawn on them. A newspaper headline read, "60,000 give O'Hare a hero's welcome here." The United States in 1942 badly needed a live hero, and Butch O'Hare was a young, handsome naval aviator, so he participated in several war bond tours the following months.

On June 19, 1942, O'Hare assumed command of VF-3, relieving Lieutenant Commander Thach. He was relocated to Maui, Hawaii, to instruct other pilots in combat tactics. U.S. Navy policy was to use its best combat pilots to train newer pilots, in contrast to the Japanese practice of keeping their best pilots flying combat missions. Ensign Edward L. "Whitey" Feightner, who served with O'Hare in July 1942, later said that one of the best pieces of information O'Hare passed on to him, was:

If you ever jump one of these Zeros and you surprise him, remember, the first thing he's going to do is a loop. Don't follow him into it! By the time you go into it a second time, he'll be behind you. The first thing you should do when he starts up the loop is to make a hard right turn and keep turning. You'll come right around, and when he bottoms out of the loop, you'll be right on his tail!"

O'Hare also related

First of all, remember, in today's world, whenever you take off and engage the enemy, you're going to be outnumbered. If you want to survive this war, you have to look behind you every chance you get. Even when you pull the trigger, be sure to look behind because there's gonna be someone back there.

An anecdote about O'Hare, serving as an instructor on Hawaii mid-1942:

[O'Hare] was a great swimmer and spearfisherman, and he insisted that the squadron swim with him. Swimming with Butch O'Hare meant that at eight o'clock in the morning, you swam out into the ocean off Maui; he would still be out there at three in the afternoon! If he got hungry, Butch would roll over and dive, and the next thing you knew, he would come up with a fish of some sort. Then he'd just roll over and lie on his back like an otter and eat the thing raw! He really impressed us with that! One day, he came back to the surface with an octopus draped over his arm. He said, "Now, you have to learn how to kill these things, boys: you bite 'em right behind the eye." And with that, he chomped down! The octopus has some sort of spinal cord there, and biting it there does kill it! Then we had to go back to the beach where Butch would put these things in a frying pan with a little oil and some salt and stir them around. He enjoyed them, but they tasted like old rubber tires to me!

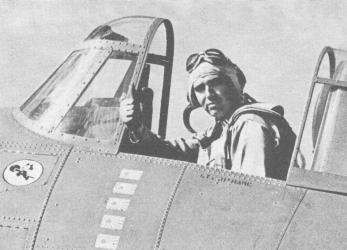
LT O'Hare's F4F-3 Wildcat carrying the "Felix the Cat" insignia (1942)

On March 2, 1943, O'Hare met Rita in San Diego, California and hugged his one-month-old daughter, Kathleen, for the first time. His family resided in Coronado at 549 Orange Avenue, near North Island NAS. At the end of March 1943, O'Hare made Ensign Alexander Vraciu, a young Naval Reservist just out of flight school, his wingman. On July 15, VF-3 swapped designations with VF-6 squadron.

=== Return to combat ===
Equipped with the highly successful follow-on to the Wildcat, the new Grumman F6F-3 Hellcat, two-thirds of VF-6 (twenty-four F6F-3s) under O'Hare's command embarked on August 22, 1943, on the light carrier USS Independence. The arrival of the F6Fs with their powerful Pratt & Whitney R-2800 radial engines in late 1943, combined with the deployment of the new Essex-class carriers and the Independence-class carriers, immediately gave the U.S. Pacific Fleet air supremacy wherever the Fast Carrier Force operated. The Hellcat's first combat mission occurred on August 31, 1943, in a strike against Marcus Island. The F6F did well against Japanese fighters and proved that with the right tactics and teamwork the Japanese Zero need not be considered a superior enemy. VF-6's combat debut on the Independence also went reasonably well. For his actions in battles near Marcus Island on August 31, O'Hare was awarded the Distinguished Flying Cross. For his actions in subsequent missions near Wake Island on October 5, O'Hare was awarded a Gold Star in lieu of a second Distinguished Flying Cross.

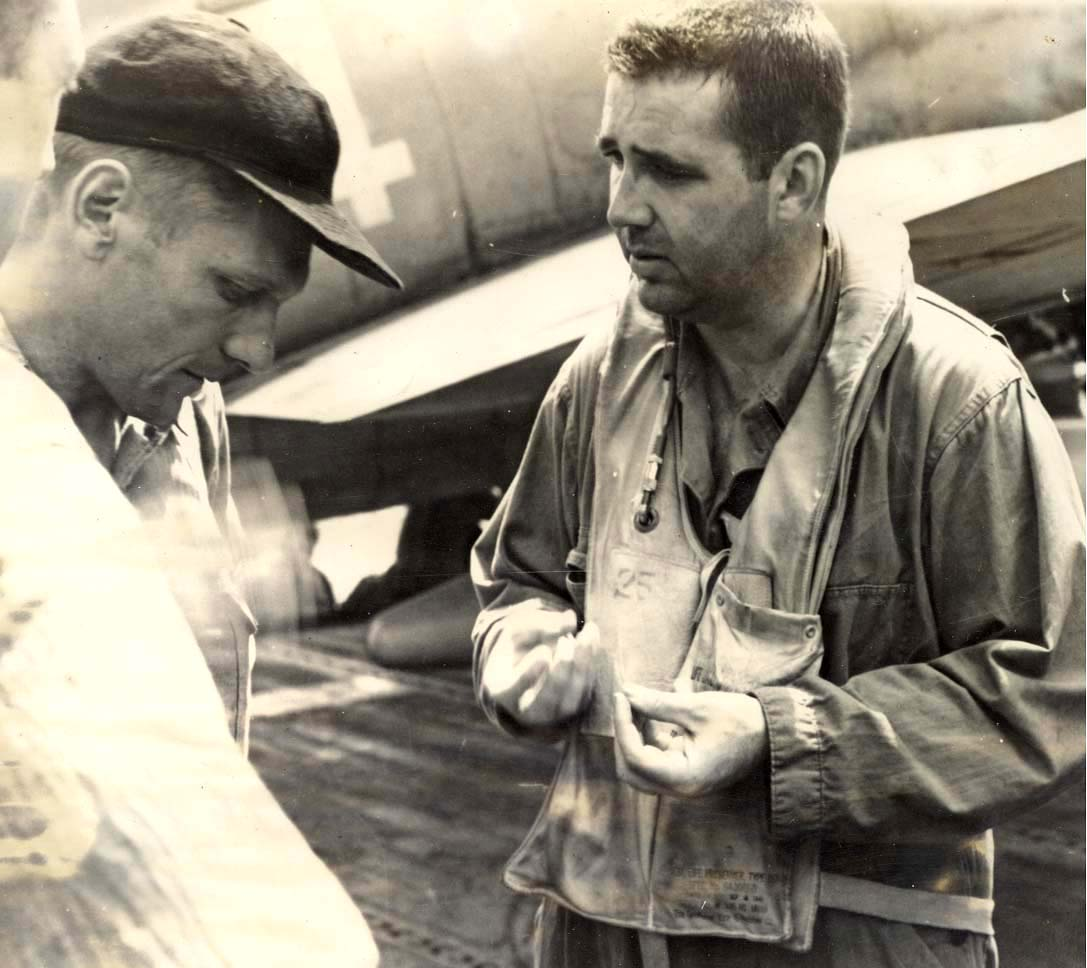
O'Hare and leading crew chief Williams "Chief Willy" beside a F6F-3 Hellcat talk things over at Wake, October 5, 1943.

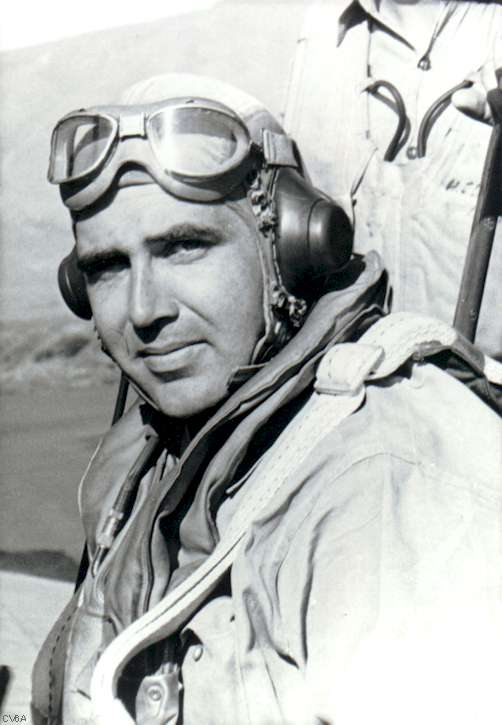
O'Hare as Air Group Six Commander in the cockpit of a Grumman F6F-3 (1943)

On October 10, 1943, O'Hare flew with VF-6 again in the airstrikes against Wake Island. On this mission, the future ace Lt.(jg) Alex Vraciu was his wingman – both Butch and Vraciu shot down one enemy plane that day. When they came across an enemy formation Butch took the outside aeroplane and Vraciu took the inside plane. Butch went below the clouds to get a Japanese Mitsubishi Zero and Vraciu lost him, so Vraciu kept an eye on a second Zero that went to Wake Island and landed. Vraciu strafed the Zero on the ground, then saw a "Betty" bomber and shot it down. Upon returning to the carrier, O'Hare asked Vraciu where he went and Vraciu knew then that he should have definitely stayed with his leader. Alex Vraciu later said after the war, "O'Hare taught many of the squadron members little things that would later save their lives. One example was to swivel your neck before starting a strafing run to make sure enemy fighters were not on your tail." Vraciu also learned from O'Hare the "high side pass" used for attacking the G4M "Betty" bombers. The high side technique was used to avoid the lethal 20 mm fire of the "Betty"'s tail gunner. The Wake Island raid would be the last occasion Butch would lead VF-6 in battle. According to orders dated September 17, 1943, October found O'Hare as Commander Air Group (CAG) commanding Air Group Six, embarked on USS Enterprise. Functioning as CAG, O'Hare was given command of the entire Enterprise air group: Grumman F6F Hellcat fighters, Douglas SBD Dauntless dive bombers, Grumman TBF Avenger torpedo bombers and 100 pilots.

Now overseeing three squadrons, O'Hare still insisted that everyone call him "Butch". O'Hare's VF-6 squadron would "still stay broken up" among three light aircraft carriers, the squadron had made itself just too useful filling out the light carrier air groups, and AirPac had no well-trained replacements on hand. As a result, Fighting Squadron Two (VF-2) boarded the USS Enterprise from November 1943 and became Butch's new Fighting Squadron. While he readied his new air group, he suffered what he intended as only a temporary separation from his beloved VF-6 "Felix the Cat" Squadron. The news, that the commanding officer had to leave them, hit the men of VF-6 hard. O'Hare first flew a TBM-1 Avenger as CAG-6 command aircraft with bombardier Del Delchamps, AOM1/c and radioman Hal Coleman as crew members. With its good radio facilities, docile handling, and long-range, the Grumman Avenger made an ideal command aircraft for Air Group Commanders (CAGs), but Butch considered the Grumman torpedo bomber as a 'lame turkey' compared to the Grumman F6F Hellcat fighter.

Later Rear Admiral Arthur W. Radford honored a request from O'Hare to take a fighter as command aircraft instead of the Avenger, so O'Hare in a fateful decision happily drew Grumman F6F-3 Hellcat Bureau Number 66168 from the fleet pool to become his principal CAG plane, numbered "00". From 20 – November 23, 1943, the U.S. forces landed in the Gilberts (Tarawa and Makin), and the Enterprise joined in providing close air support to the Marines landing on Makin Island. Equipped with the Grumman F6F Hellcat, the U.S. Navy fighter pilots could protect the fleet from attacking Japanese aircraft.

=== Final mission and death ===
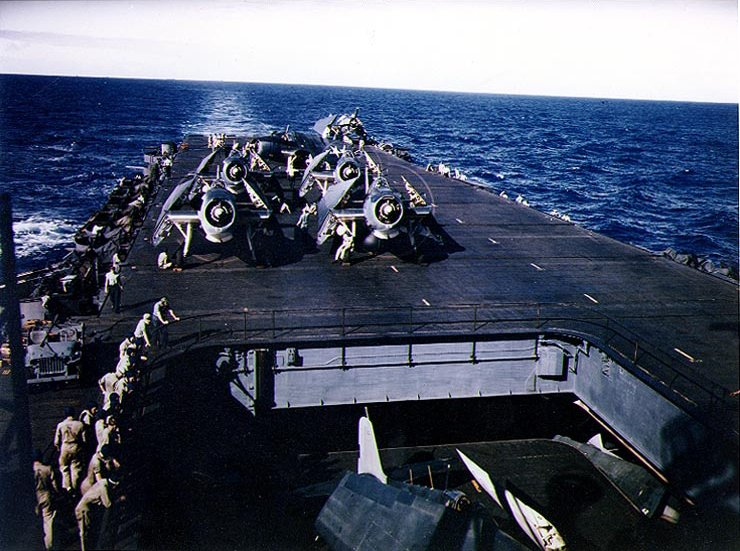
Avengers warming up on Enterprise

Grumman F6F-3 Hellcats preparing for take-off

Faced with U.S. daylight air superiority, the Japanese quickly developed tactics to send torpedo-armed "Betty" bombers on night missions from their bases in the Marianas against the U.S. aircraft carriers. In late November they launched these low-altitude strikes almost nightly to attack Enterprise and other American ships, so Rear Admiral Arthur W. Radford, O'Hare and Commander Tom Hamilton, CV-6 air officer, were deeply involved in developing ad hoc counter-tactics, the first carrier-based night fighter operations of the U.S. Navy. O'Hare's plan required the carrier's Fighter Director Officer (FDO) to spot incoming enemy formations at a distance and send a "Bat Team" section consisting of a Grumman TBF Avenger torpedo bomber and two Grumman F6F Hellcat fighters toward the Japanese intruders. Although improvements in new types of aviation radar were soon forthcoming from the engineers at MIT and the electronic industry, the available primitive radars in 1943 were very bulky, attributed to the fact that they contained vacuum tube technology. Radars were carried only on the roomy TBF Avengers, but not on the smaller and faster Hellcats, so the radar-equipped TBF Avenger would lead the Hellcats into position behind the incoming bombers, close enough for the F6F pilots to spot visually the blue exhaust flames of the Japanese bombers. Finally, the Hellcats would close in and shoot down the torpedo-carrying bombers.

One of the four "Bat Team" fighter pilots to conduct these experimental night fighter operations to intercept and destroy enemy bombers attacking Allied landing forces was then-LT Roy Marlin Voris, who after the war founded and commanded the Navy's flight demonstration squadron, the Blue Angels.

On the night of November 26, 1943, the Enterprise introduced the experiment in the co-operative control of Avengers and Hellcats for night fighting, when the three-plane team from the ship broke up a large group of land-based bombers attacking Task Group TG 50.2. O'Hare volunteered to lead this mission to conduct the first-ever Navy nighttime fighter attack from an aircraft carrier to intercept a large force of enemy torpedo bombers. When the call came to man the fighters, Butch O'Hare was eating. He grabbed up part of his supper in his fist and started running for the ready room. He was dressed in loose marine coveralls. The night fighter unit consisting of 1 VT and 2 VF was catapulted between 17:58 and 18:01. The pilots for this flight were Butch O'Hare and Ensign Warren Andrew "Andy" Skon of VF-2 in F6Fs and the Squadron Commander of VT-6, LCDR John L. Phillips in a TBF-1C. The crew of the TBF torpedo plane consisted of LTJG Hazen B. Rand, a radar specialist and Alvin Kernan, A. B., AOM1/c. The "Black Panthers", as the night fighters were dubbed, took off before dusk and flew out into the incoming mass of Japanese planes.

Confusion and complications endangered the success of the mission. The Hellcats first had trouble finding the Avenger, the FDO had difficulty guiding any of them on the targets. O'Hare and Ensign W. Skon in their F6F Hellcats finally got into position behind the Avenger. Butch O'Hare had been well aware of the deadly danger of friendly fire in this situation – he radioed to the Avenger pilot of his section, "Hey, Phil, turn those running lights on. I want to be sure it's a yellow devil I'm drilling."

O'Hare was last seen at the 5 o'clock position of the TBF. About that time, the turret gunner of the TBF, Alvin Kernan (AOM1/c) noticed a Japanese G4M "Betty" bomber above and almost directly behind O'Hare's 6 o'clock position. Kernan opened fire with the TBF's .50 cal. machine gun in the dorsal turret and a Japanese gunner fired back. O'Hare's F6F Hellcat apparently was caught in a crossfire. Seconds later O'Hare's F6F slid out of formation to port, pushing slightly ahead at about 160 knots (300 km/h; 180 mph) and then vanished in the dark. The Avenger pilot, Lieutenant Commander Phillips, called repeatedly to O'Hare, but received no reply. Ensign Skon responded: "Mr Phillips, this is Skon. I saw Mr O'Hare's lights go out and, at the same instant, he seemed to veer off and slant down into darkness." Phillips later asserted, as the Hellcat dropped out of view, it seemed to release something that fell almost vertically at a speed too slow for anything but a parachute. Then something "whitish-gray" appeared below, perhaps the splash of the aircraft plunging into the sea.

Lieutenant Commander Phillips reported the position (1°26′0″N 171°56′0″W) to the ship. After dawn, a three-plane search was made, but no trace of O'Hare or his aircraft were found. On November 29, a PBY Catalina flying boat also conducted a search with no positive result, and O'Hare was reported missing in action.

In 1997, Fateful Rendezvous: The Life of Butch O'Hare, by Steve Ewing and John B. Lundstrom, the authors claim that Japanese guns, and not Kernan's, killed O'Hare, stating that "Butch fell to his old familiar adversary, a Betty. Most likely he died from or was immediately disabled by, a lucky shot from the forward observer crouched in the rikko's [Betty's] forward glassed-in nose ... the nose gunner's 7.7 mm slugs very likely penetrated Butch's cockpit from above on the port side and ahead of the F6F's armor plate." Ewing and Lundstrom state that Kernan is "wrongly accused of shooting down Butch." Ewing and Lundstrom point out that the "most influential and oft-cited" account of O'Hare's last mission came in a 1962 history of the Enterprise by CDR Edward P. Stafford, which relied on action reports and recollections of former Enterprise crew, but did not contain interviews with any of the living participants. By contrast, Ewing and Lundstrom interviewed the still-living survivors of O'Hare's last mission: F6F pilot Skon, TBF radar officer Rand, and TBF gunner Kernan. Ewing and Lundstrom write, "Through Stafford and other accounts based largely on the action reports, Butch has wrongly become known as one of America's most famous 'friendly fire' casualties."

On December 9, the official word arrived that O'Hare was missing in action. His mother Selma left for San Diego to be with his wife Rita and his daughter. LCDR Bob Jackson wrote to Rita O'Hare from the Enterprise to describe the extensive but unsuccessful search for her husband. In the letter, LCDR Jackson quoted RADM Arthur W. Radford saying of Butch O'Hare that he "never saw one individual so universally liked." The hardest thing O'Hare's former wingman Alex Vraciu had to do was to talk to O'Hare's wife Rita after returning stateside. On December 20, 1943, a Solemn Pontifical Mass of Requiem was offered for Butch O'Hare at the St. Louis Cathedral.

As O'Hare went missing on November 26, 1943, and was declared dead a year later, his widow Rita received her husband's posthumous decorations, a Purple Heart and the Navy Cross on November 26, 1944.

== Honors and awards ==
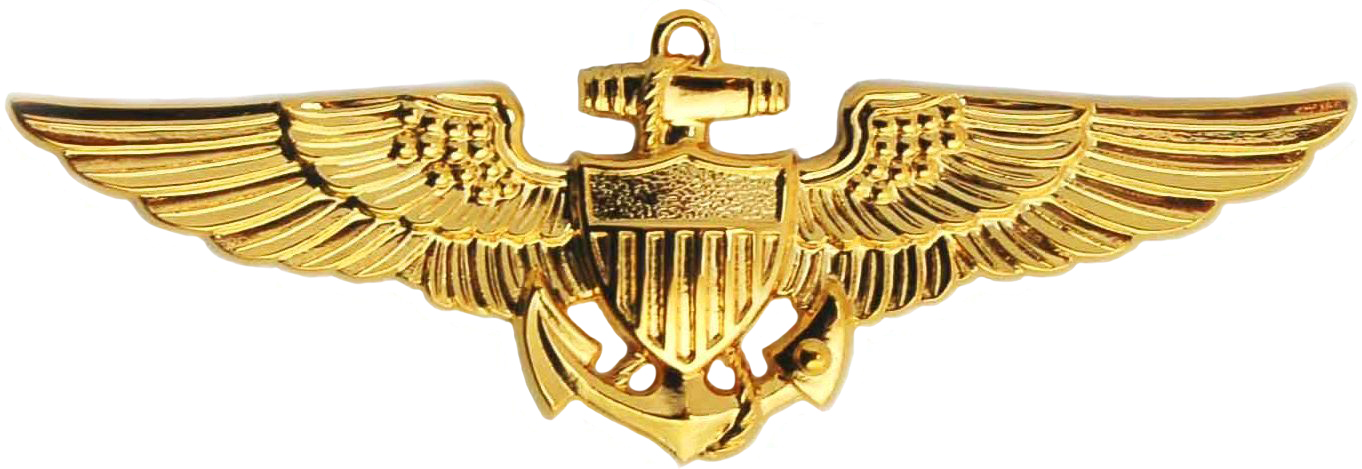

Naval Aviator Badge
Medal of Honor
| Navy Cross | Distinguished Flying Cross w/ one 5/16" Gold Star | Purple Heart |
| Combat Action Ribbon | Navy Presidential Unit Citation | American Defense Service Medal |
| American Campaign Medal | Asiatic-Pacific Campaign Medal w/ three 3/16" bronze stars | World War II Victory Medal |

=== Medal of Honor citation ===
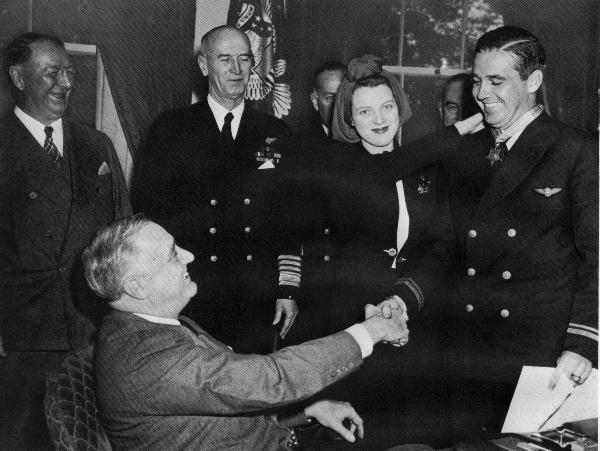
Medal of Honor presentation on April 21, 1942: President Roosevelt, Frank Knox, Secretary of the Navy (behind FDR), Admiral Ernest King, Edward O'Hare and his wife Rita

For conspicuous gallantry and intrepidity in aerial combat, at grave risk of his life above and beyond the call of duty, as section leader and pilot of Fighting Squadron 3 on February 20, 1942. Having lost the assistance of his teammates, Lieutenant O'Hare interposed his fighter between his ship and an advancing enemy formation of 9 attacking twin-engine heavy bombers. Without hesitation, alone and unaided, he repeatedly attacked this enemy formation, at close range in the face of intense combined machine gun and cannon fire. Despite this concentrated opposition, Lieutenant O'Hare, by his gallant and courageous action, his extremely skilful marksmanship in making the most of every shot of his limited amount of ammunition, shot down 5 enemy bombers and severely damaged a sixth before they reached the bomb release point. As a result of his gallant action—one of the most daring, if not the most daring, single action in the history of combat aviation—he undoubtedly saved his carrier from serious damage. (Note: In 1942 O'Hare and the U.S. Navy thought that nine planes constituted the second wave, but actually there were only eight, as confirmed by Japanese war records. In addition to this, the Japanese Mitsubishi G4M Betty bomber was only a medium bomber, not a heavy bomber, as stated wrong in the MOH citation.)

=== Navy Cross citation ===
The President of the United States of America takes pride in presenting the Navy Cross (Posthumously) to Lieutenant Commander Edward Henry "Butch" O'Hare (NSN: 0-78672), United States Navy, for extraordinary heroism in operations against the enemy while serving as Pilot of a carrier-based Navy Fighter Plane in Fighting Squadron TWO (VF-2), attached to the U.S.S. ENTERPRISE (CV-6), and deployed over Tarawa in the Gilbert Islands, in action against enemy Japanese forces on 26 November 1943. When warnings were received of the approach of a large force of Japanese torpedo bombers, Lieutenant Commander O'Hare volunteered to lead a fighter section of aircraft from his carrier, the first time such a mission had been attempted at night, in order to intercept the attackers. He fearlessly led his three-plane group into combat against a large formation of hostile aircraft and assisted in shooting down two Japanese aeroplanes and dispersed the remainder. Lieutenant Commander O'Hare's outstanding courage, daring airmanship and devotion to duty were in keeping with the highest traditions of the United States Naval Service. He gallantly gave his life for his country.

=== USS O'Hare ===
On January 27, 1945, the United States Navy named a Gearing-class destroyer USS O'Hare in his honor. The ship was launched June 22, 1945, with his mother, Selma O'Hare, as the sponsor. O'Hare was decommissioned on October 31, 1973, then transferred on loan and later sold to the Spanish Navy. In 1992, the Spanish Navy decommissioned and scrapped the ship.

=== O'Hare International Airport ===
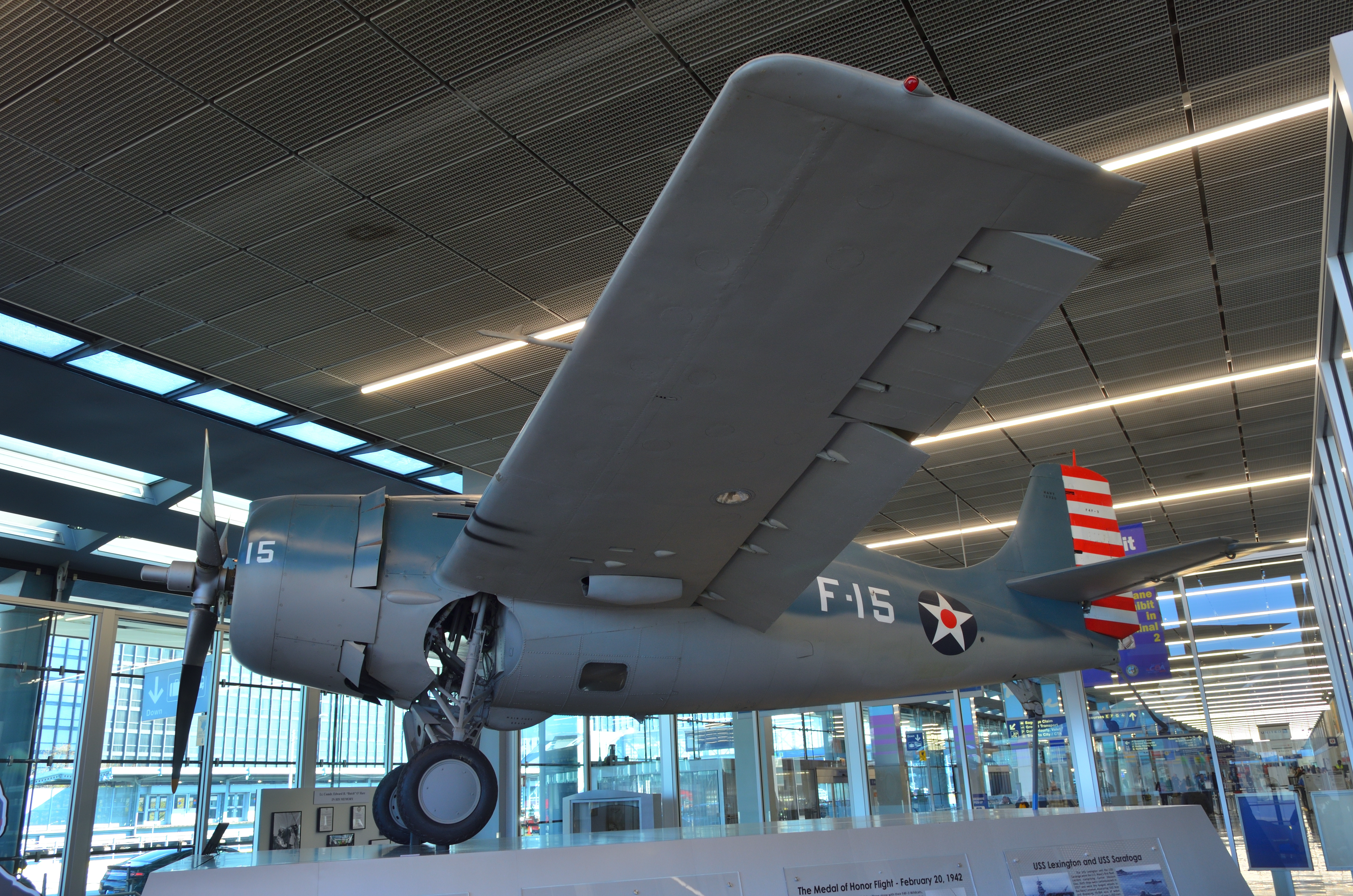
Grumman F4F-3 Wildcat on display in O'Hare's Terminal 2, restored in the markings of "Butch" O'Hare's plane

Colonel Robert R. McCormick, publisher of the Chicago Tribune, suggested that the name of Chicago's Orchard Depot Airport be changed as a tribute to O'Hare. On September 19, 1949, the airport was renamed O'Hare International Airport to honor O'Hare's bravery. The airport displays a Grumman F4F-3 like the one flown during the Medal of Honor action.

The Grumman F4F-3 Wildcat on display was recovered virtually intact from the bottom of Lake Michigan, where it sank after a training accident in 1943 when it went off the training aircraft carrier USS Wolverine. In 2001, the Air Classics Museum remodeled the aircraft to replicate the F4F-3 Wildcat that O'Hare flew on his Medal of Honor flight. The restored Wildcat is exhibited in the west end of Terminal 2 behind the security checkpoint to honor O'Hare International Airport's namesake.

=== Other honors ===
In September 1949, O'Hare's name was engraved on the National Memorial Cemetery of the Pacific "Wall of the Missing" in Honolulu. In March 1963, President John F. Kennedy performed a wreath-laying ceremony at O'Hare Airport to honor Butch O'Hare. The Patriots Point Naval and Maritime Museum is honoring O'Hare with an F4F-3A on display and a plaque dedicated by the USS Yorktown CV-10 association, "May Butch O'Hare rest in peace ...".

== See also ==
- Edward J. O'Hare
- List of aviators
- List of Medal of Honor recipients for World War II
- List of people who disappeared mysteriously at sea

== Bibliography ==
- "Air Classics", May 2003.
- Ewing, Steve; Lundstrom, John B. (1997). Fateful Rendezvous: The Life of Butch O'Hare. Annapolis, Maryland: Naval Institute Press. ISBN 1-55750-247-1.
- Lundstrom, John B. (1984). The First Team: Pacific Naval Air Combat from Pearl Harbor to Midway. Annapolis, Maryland: Naval Institute Press. ISBN 0-87021-189-7.
- Reynolds, Clark G. (1982). The Carrier War (Time-Life Epic of Flight series). Alexandria, Virginia: Time-Life Books. ISBN 0-8094-3304-4.
- "Edward Butch O'Hare". Legends of Airpower DVD, Episode #309. Frederick, MD: 3 Roads Communications, Inc., 2003.
- "World Battlefronts: Butch O'Hare". Time. Vol. 42, no. 25. December 20, 1943. Archived from the original on December 24, 2007.
- Shores, Christopher & Cull, Brian & Izawa, Yasuho Krvavá jatka II. Plzeň, Czech Republic: Mustang, 1995, ISBN 80-85831-73-2 (Czech translation of English Bloody Shambles Volume Two: The Complete Account of the Air War in the Far East, from the Defence of Sumatra to the Fall of Burma, 1942)
