= San Clemente Naval Auxiliary Air Station =

Military airport on San Clemente Island, California, United States

NAAS San Clemente
- San Clemente, California, United States
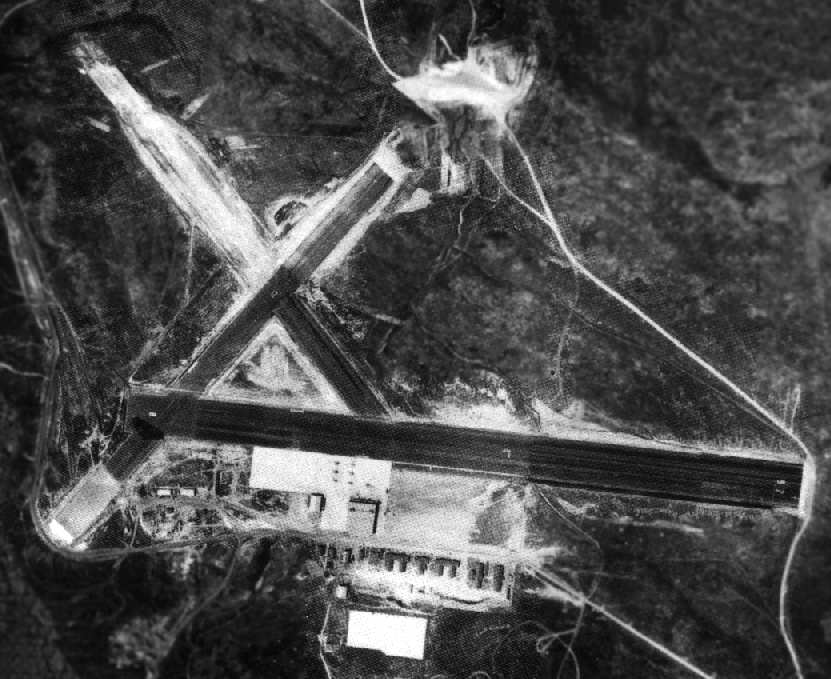
- Aerial photo of NAAS San Clemente in 1944

Site information
- Type: Naval Auxiliary Air Station
- Controlled by: United States Navy
- Condition: Abandoned

Location
- Location in California
- Coordinates: 32°56′48″N 118°31′42″W

Site history
- Built: 1934
- Events: World War II

San Clemente Naval Auxiliary Air Station was a naval training airfield located near the center of the San Clemente Island, California. It was established in 1934 as San Clemente Airfield, and was renamed to Naval Auxiliary Air Facility San Clemente Island in 1943, supporting bomb testing, radar training, and gunnery training. The current Naval Auxiliary Landing Field San Clemente Island has since replaced the airfield.

== History ==
Also called San Clemente Airfield, the airfield was built in 1934 with two 1,600-foot dirt runways. San Clemente Island is owned and operated by the United States Navy since November 7, 1934. The Works Progress Administration and a civilian contractor improved the airfield in 1938. The two runways were rebuilt to paved at 3,000-feet and 2,000 feet long by the WPA. The WPA also built a new hangar at the base. The airfield became a US Marines training base with the start of World War 2. A Marines squadron was stationed at Airfield and began air scouting training in 1942. The Marines trained in 19 Vought SB2U Vindicator carcraft and a one Grumman J2F Duck seaplane. The US Army installed two radar stations nearby and the runways were improved in 1941, the 3,000-foot runway was made into a 5,000-foot runway. In 1943 the airfield was renamed Naval Auxiliary Air Facility San Clemente Island. The Airfield supported bomb testing, radar training, Naval fighter gunnery training, and electronic countermeasures on the Island during the war.

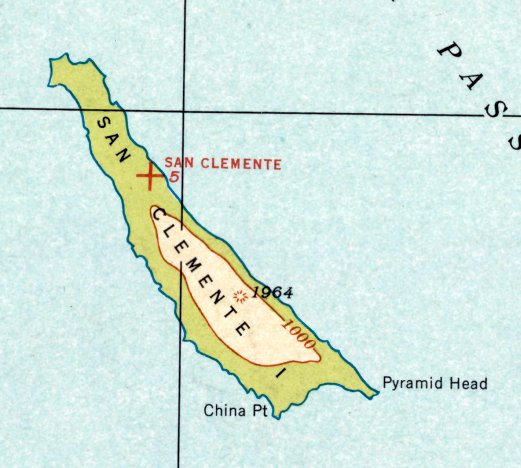
San Clemente Naval Auxiliary Air Station on a 1943 map of San Clemente Island

=== Post-war ===
Over the years the size and scope of the airfield was reduced, by 1977 the 2,000-foot runways were removed, and the east/west 5,000-foot runway was used rarely and closed at times. The airfield was sometimes used for training in amphibious, air assault, and UAV operations. Today, there are two helipads on the old runway. Naval Auxiliary Landing Field San Clemente Island has since become the main active airfield on San Clemente Island.

== See also ==
- California during World War II
- American Theater (1939–1945)
- United States home front during World War II
- DeWitt General Hospital
- Ground Equipment Facility J-36A
