= Ground Equipment Facility J-31 =

Radar station in Rancho Palos Verdes, California, US

San Pedro Hill Air Force Station
- Part of 1961-1968: Air Defense Command; 1968-1979: Aerospace Defense Command
- San Pedro Hill, Rancho Palos Verdes, California (highest elevation of the Palos Verdes Hills)
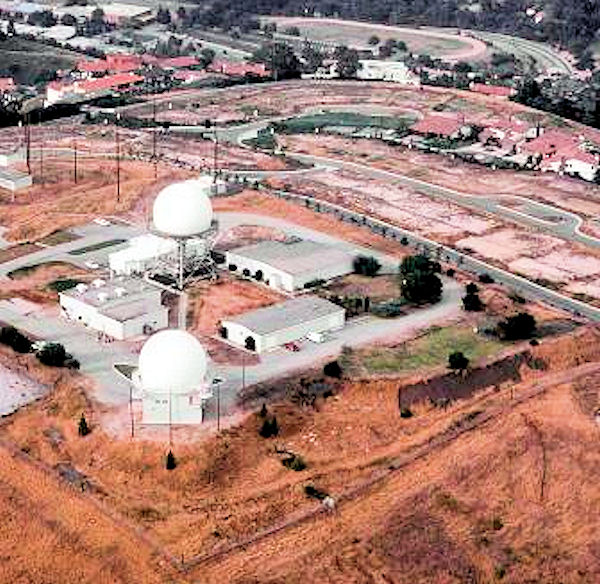
- San Pedro Hill AFS in 1988.

Site information
- Type: USAF General Surveillance Radar Station
- Code: RP-39: 1950 ADC permanent network Z-39: 1963 July 31 NORAD network J-31: 1983 Joint Surveillance System
- Controlled by: 1960-79: USAF 670th Radar Squadron; 1979-97: Federal Aviation Administration
- Condition: Radar site of Los Angeles ARTCC

Location
- Coordinates: 33°44′46″N 118°20′10″W; 1.2 miles (1.9 km) southeast of Rolling Hills

Site history
- In use: 1960-1979

Ground Equipment Facility J-31 (San Pedro Hill Air Force Station during the Cold War) is a Joint Surveillance System radar site of the Western Air Defense Sector (WADS) and the Federal Aviation Administration's air traffic control radar network for the Los Angeles Air Route Traffic Control Center. The facility's Air Route Surveillance Radar Model 1E with an ATCBI-6 beacon interrogator system are operated by the FAA and provide sector data to North American Aerospace Defense Command. The site provided Semi-Automatic Ground Environment data to the 1959-66 Norton AFB Direction Center for the USAF Los Angeles Air Defense Sector. The site also provided Project Nike data to the 1960-74 Fort MacArthur Direction Center ~3 mi (4.8 km) away for the smaller US Army Los Angeles Defense Area—as well as gap-filler radar coverage for the 1963-74 Integrated Fire Control area of Malibu Nike battery LA-78 on San Vicente Mountain.

== History ==
The "ADC/FAA joint-use facility" began operations in 1961 with an FAA ARSR-1C radar. After the April 1, 1961, move of the 670th Radar Squadron (SAGE)--formerly the 670th AC&W Squadron—from San Clemente Island Air Force Station, the Los Angeles Air Defense Sector was activated June 1. The squadron was assigned to the "Fort MacArthur AI" (Army Installation) and operated the San Pedro Hill radars which included a General Electric AN/FPS-6B Radar and an Avco AN/FPS-26 Radar for height finding. In 1964, the station's Westinghouse AN/FPS-27 Radar was installed (removed 1969) and the AN/FPS-6B was modified to an AN/FPS-90. In April 1976 the squadron was redesignated Detachment 1 of Luke AFB's 26th Air Defense Squadron (the AN/FPS-26A was removed in this time frame).

The radar station with 18 military & 5 civilians was planned for transfer after the 1978 Base Realignment and Closure Commission. After the station transferred to the FAA when Aerospace Defense Command was inactivated, the Air Force continued to operate the AN/FPS-90 height-finder by then modified to an AN/FPS-116 (removed c. 1988). In the late 1990s, the Air Force terminated the data-tie at San Pedro Hill and established a data-tie with the new Navy-installed ARSR-4 radar at San Clemente Island's Mount Thirst. The Raytheon ARSR-1E Radar at San Pedro Hill was in use by November 2010.

External images
- 1970s w/ 2 radomes & empty pedestal
- San Pedro AN/FPS-116
- 2005 FAA image w/ 2 radomes
