= Edward J. O'Hare =

American lawyer (1895–1939)

- Born: September 5, 1893; St. Louis, Missouri, U.S.
- Died: November 8, 1939 (aged 46); Chicago, Illinois, U.S.
- Cause of death: Assassination

Edward Joseph O'Hare (September 5, 1893 – November 8, 1939), a.k.a. "Easy Eddie", was a lawyer in St. Louis and later in Chicago, where he began working with Al Capone, and later helped federal prosecutors convict Capone of tax evasion. In 1939, a week before Capone was released from Alcatraz, O'Hare was shot to death while driving. He was the father of Medal of Honor recipient Butch O'Hare, for whom O'Hare International Airport is named.

== Early life in St. Louis ==
Edward Joseph O'Hare, known to friends and family as E.J., was born on September 5, 1893, in St. Louis to first-generation Irish-American parents Patrick Joseph O'Hare and Cecelia Ellen Malloy O'Hare. On June 4, 1912, E.J. O'Hare married Selma Anna Lauth, a native of St. Louis, born on November 13, 1890. She traced her heritage to Germany. E.J. and Selma started their family in an apartment above Selma's father's grocery store in the Soulard neighborhood. They had three children: Edward ("Butch"), born in 1914, Patricia, born in 1919, and Marilyn, born in 1924.

E.J. passed the Missouri bar exam in 1923 and joined a law firm. From 1925, O'Hare operated dog tracks in Chicago, Boston, and Miami. O'Hare, as a lawyer, represented the inventor Owen P. Smith, high commissioner of the International Greyhound Racing Association, who patented a mechanical running rabbit for use in dog racing. In 1930, his profitable work for Smith enabled O'Hare's family to move into a brand-new home in the Holly Hills home that included a swimming pool and a skating rink. The O'Hare family used to spend the summers at river camps on the Meramec and Gasconade rivers to escape the heat of St. Louis. Butch, who had received a .22-caliber rifle from E.J, developed shooting skills by plinking in the river at cans and bottles that were thrown.

E.J. became fascinated with flying, even hitching a ride in Charles Lindbergh's mail plane. O'Hare took his first job as lead pilot of an air mail route operated by Robertson Aircraft Co. of Lambert Field in St Louis. E.J. then flew commercially whenever possible, and he found chances for his teenage son to briefly take the controls. As a result, his son Butch, the later Medal of Honor recipient, best known for his extreme bravery as a U.S. naval aviator in World War II, became a competent marksman and familiar with planes.

When Owen Patrick Smith died, O'Hare represented the administratrix of Smith's estate, Hannah M. Smith. E.J. began to expand his business interests from the St. Louis levee to Chicago.

One day in the 1920s, E.J. came home to find his son, Butch, sprawled on a couch reading books and eating banana layer cake and doughnuts. The father decided that his boy was showing signs of laziness and enrolled him at Western Military Academy in Alton, Illinois.

== Chicago ==
Divorced from his wife Selma in 1927, O'Hare moved to Chicago. Selma stayed in St. Louis with her two daughters Patricia and Marilyn, while Butch went to Western Military Academy.

In Chicago, O'Hare met Al Capone, whose dominant Chicago Outfit ran Chicago rackets and bootlegging during Prohibition. O'Hare and Capone began collaborating in business and law. O'Hare made a second fortune through his ties to Capone.

O'Hare became engaged to Ursula Sue Granata, a secretary, the sister of a Mob-affiliated Illinois state representative. The engagement went on for seven years because they were Catholics, and the Church would not recognize O'Hare's divorce. Thus, they could not have a church wedding. However, O'Hare was hopeful that a request for a dispensation from the Vatican would be granted by 1940.

But in 1930, O'Hare turned against Capone. He asked John Rogers, a reporter for the St. Louis Post-Dispatch, to arrange a meeting with the Internal Revenue Service (IRS), which was trying to convict Capone of tax evasion. Rogers organized a meeting with IRS agent Frank J. Wilson. O'Hare subsequently played a key role in Capone's prosecution and conviction. Agent Wilson (also Chief of the U.S. Secret Service between 1937 and 1946) said later:

On the inside of the gang I had one of the best undercover men I have ever known: Eddie O'Hare.

It is believed O'Hare directed investigator Wilson to the Capone bookkeeper who became a key witness at the 1931 trial and also helped break the code used in the ledgers by Capone's bookkeepers. At the start of Capone's trial in the court of Judge James Wilkerson, O'Hare tipped the government that Capone had fixed the jury. Thus alerted, Judge Wilkerson switched juries with another federal trial before the Capone trial began. (This incident was depicted in the 1987 film The Untouchables.)

Capone was found guilty and sent to prison in 1931.

== Assassination ==
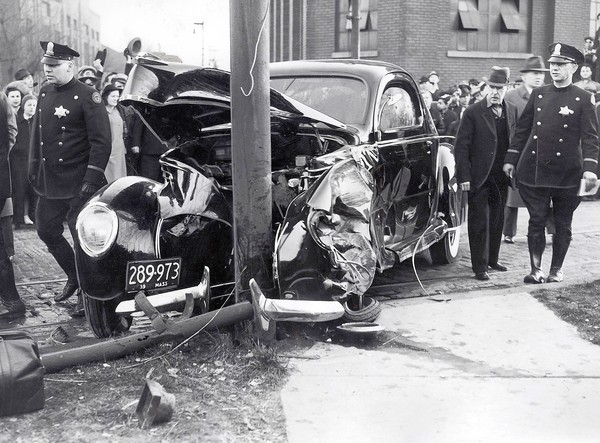
Assassination of Edward O'Hare

O'Hare was shot and killed on November 8, 1939, while driving his 1939 Lincoln-Zephyr coupe in Chicago. When he left his office at Sportsman's Park racetrack in Cicero, Illinois, in the afternoon, he was reportedly carrying a cleaned and oiled Spanish-made .32-caliber semi-automatic pistol, something unusual for him.

Two shotgun-wielding gunmen in a dark sedan drove alongside O'Hare as he approached the intersection of Ogden Avenue and Rockwell Street. Both fired a volley of big-game slugs, killing O'Hare instantly at the age of 46. His Lincoln crashed into a roadside post while the killers continued eastbound on Ogden Ave and were lost in traffic. No arrests were ever made.

In 2010, Chicago Alderman Ed Burke asked the Chicago Police Department Cold Case Squad to re-examine O'Hare's murder in light of a new book, Get Capone, which made allegations about the crime.

== In popular culture ==
- In the 2010-2014 HBO series Boardwalk Empire, the character of Mike D'Angelo played by Louis Cancelmi is based on Edward J. O'Hare. In the last season he is shown to be an undercover agent who helped gather evidence to convict Al Capone on Tax evasion.
- The story of 'Easy Eddie', and his son, is mentioned in the "Payback" chapter of the novel Meg: A Novel of Deep Terror, by American author Steve Alten, published 1996.

== See also ==
- List of homicides in Illinois § Organized crime
