= AN/TSQ-8 =

The Martin AN/TSQ-8 Coordinate Data Set was a Project Nike Command, control and coordination system (CCCS) system for converting data between Army Air Defense Command Posts (AADCP) and Integrated Fire Control sites for missile Launch Areas. The AN/TSQ-8 in the Firing Unit Integration Facility (FUIF) was first installed for each Launch Area controlled from a Martin AN/FSG-1 Antiaircraft Defense System and then later for other Nike CCCS. The system included a "data converter, range computer, summing amplifier, status relay panel, status control panel, problem unit, [and] power control panel".

In accordance with the Joint Electronics Type Designation System (JETDS), the "AN/TSQ-8" designation represents the 8th design of an Army-Navy electronic device for ground transportable special combination equipment. The JETDS system also now is used to name all Department of Defense electronic systems.

The AN/TSQ-8 in each FUIF was the remote terminus of the AN/FSG-1's automated data link (ADL) of AADCP digital information that included identification friend or foe status (e.g., "foe" symbol), the "prepare to engage" symbol (for the battery to track the designated foe), and the attack symbol from the AADCP director to the Battery Control Officer who issued the firing order to a ready missile.

== History ==
The first AN/TSQ-8 training course for Army technicians was in April 1958 at the "Martin-Orlando facility" after the Ft Meade AN/FSG-1 was "operational" on December 5, 1957 (the last AN/FSG-1 was at Fort MacArthur in December 1960.) In 1961, the AN/TSQ-8 was deployed for the ADL interface with portable Martin AN/GSG-5 & AN/GSG-6 BIRDIEs emplaced at AADCPs for smaller defense areas (replacement Hughes AN/TSQ-51 systems were emplaced at AADCPs beginning in 1963 similarly required FUIFs). Firing Unit Integration Facilities had been replaced when the Improved Nike Hercules ground system (Western Electric System 1393 Radar Course Directing Central) was deployed and included an internal automated data link.

== See also ==
- List of military electronics of the United States
