= 670th Radar Squadron =

Inactive United States Air Force unit

670th Radar Squadron 1961-1974 Feb 1: 670th Radar Squadron (SAGE) 1950-1961 Apr 1: 670th AC&W Squadron
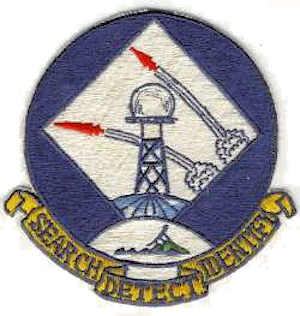
- Emblem of the 670th Radar Squadron
- Active: 1950 May 5-1976 April 1
- Country: United States
- Branch: United States Air Force
- Type: General Radar Surveillance

The 670th Radar Squadron is an inactive United States Air Force unit. It was last assigned to the 26th Air Division, Aerospace Defense Command, operating San Pedro Hill Air Force Station radars while posted at Fort MacArthur, California. It was inactivated on 1 April 1976.

The unit was a General Surveillance Radar squadron providing for the air defense of the United States.

== Lineage ==
Assignments

- 542d Aircraft Control and Warning Group, 5 May 1950
- 544th Aircraft Control and Warning Group, 27 November 1950
- 27th Air Division, 6 February 1952
- Los Angeles Air Defense Sector, 1 October 1959
- 27th Air Division, 1 April 1966
- 26th Air Division, 19 November 1969 – 1 April 1976

Stations

- Camp Cooke, California, 5 May 1950
- San Clemente Island AFS, California, 1 February 1952
- Fort MacArthur, California, April 1961-1 April 1976
