= Frederick C. Sherman =

United States Navy admiral

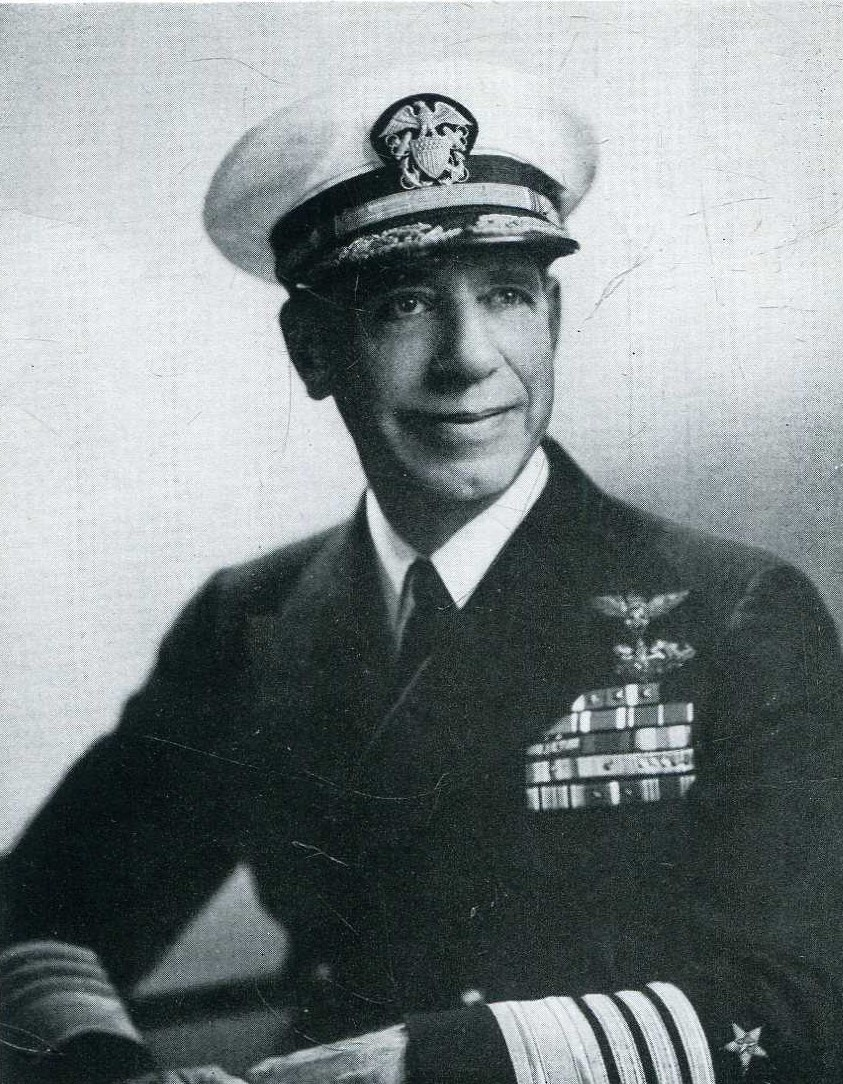
- Admiral Frederick C. Sherman
- Born: 27 May 1888; Port Huron, Michigan, U.S.
- Died: 27 July 1957 (aged 69); San Diego, California, U.S.
- Military career
- Allegiance: United States
- Branch: United States Navy
- Service years: 1910–1947
- Rank: Admiral
- Nickname: "Ted"
- Commands: United States Fifth Fleet; Carrier Division 2 USS Lexington (CV-16); USS Lexington (CV-2); USS O-7 (SS-68); USS O-8 (SS-69)
- Conflicts: World War I World War II: Battle of Coral Sea; Battle of Midway; Battle of Guadalcanal; Battle of the Philippine Sea; Battle of Leyte Gulf; Battle of Iwo Jima; Battle of Okinawa
- Awards: Navy Cross (3); Navy Distinguished Service Medal (3); Legion of Merit
- Other work: Author

Frederick Carl Sherman (27 May 1888 – 27 July 1957) was a highly decorated admiral of the United States Navy during World War II.

== Early life ==
Sherman was born in Port Huron, Michigan on 27 May 1888. His grandfather, Loren Sherman, was the longtime editor and publisher of The Daily Times in Port Huron. His father, Frederick Ward Sherman, sold the newspaper in 1907 and moved to California, where he was editor and publisher of The Daily Independent in Santa Barbara in 1911.

== Naval career ==
Sherman graduated from the United States Naval Academy in 1910. He served as commanding officer of submarines USS H-2 (SS-29) and USS O-7 (SS-68) during World War I.

After becoming a naval aviator, Sherman served as executive officer of USS Saratoga (CV-3) in 1937, and of Naval Air Station San Diego to 1938. He commanded USS Lexington (CV-2) from 1940 until her loss in the Battle of the Coral Sea. Captain Sherman was the last man to leave the sinking ship. His wife wrote a book titled Admiral Wags which told the story of the family cocker spaniel who accompanied Sherman during his command of Lexington. The dog can be seen in war footage used in the John Wayne movie In Harm's Way. Promoted to rear admiral, Sherman served as assistant chief of staff to Commander in Chief Atlantic Fleet, Admiral Ernest King until the end of 1942. He served in the Fast Carrier Task Force, as Commander, Carrier Division 2 in 1943, and as Commander, Task Group 38.3 in 1944–45.

Sherman was a three-time recipient of the Navy Cross. Promoted to vice admiral in 1945, he became Commander, United States Fifth Fleet before retiring in 1947. Upon retirement, he was promoted to admiral on the retired list.

== Later life and legacy ==
Sherman wrote Combat Command, a history of the Pacific Theater of World War II, drawing on his personal experiences. Combat Command was published in 1950 by E.P. Dutton Inc, and again by Bantam Books in 1982.

Sherman appeared on the Groucho Marx radio game show You Bet Your Life on January 4, 1950, where he mentioned his greatest thrill as being on the bridge of the USS Missouri in Tokyo Bay, watching the Japanese sign surrender terms at the end of World War II. He and a recent naval recruit contested the major prize of $1000 but were unsuccessful.

Sherman died on 27 July 1957 in San Diego, California. The Frederick C. Sherman Field on nearby San Clemente Island was dedicated in his honor on 11 January 1961.

== Decorations ==
Here is the ribbon bar of Vice Admiral Frederick C. Sherman:

Naval Aviator Badge
Submarine Warfare insignia
| 1st Row | Navy Cross with two Gold Stars | | Navy Distinguished Service Medal with two Gold Stars | |
| 2nd Row | Legion of Merit with "V" Device | Navy Commendation Medal | Nicaraguan Campaign Medal | Mexican Service Medal |
| 3rd Row | World War I Victory Medal with Submarine clasp | American Defense Service Medal with Fleet Clasp | American Campaign Medal | Asiatic-Pacific Campaign Medal with five Service stars |
| 4th Row | World War II Victory Medal | Navy Occupation Service Medal | Commander of the Order of the British Empire | Philippine Liberation Medal with two bronze stars |
