= Naval Auxiliary Landing Field San Clemente Island =

Military airport on San Clemente Island, California, United States

- Frederick Sherman Field
- Part of Naval Base Coronado
- San Clemente Island, California in the United States
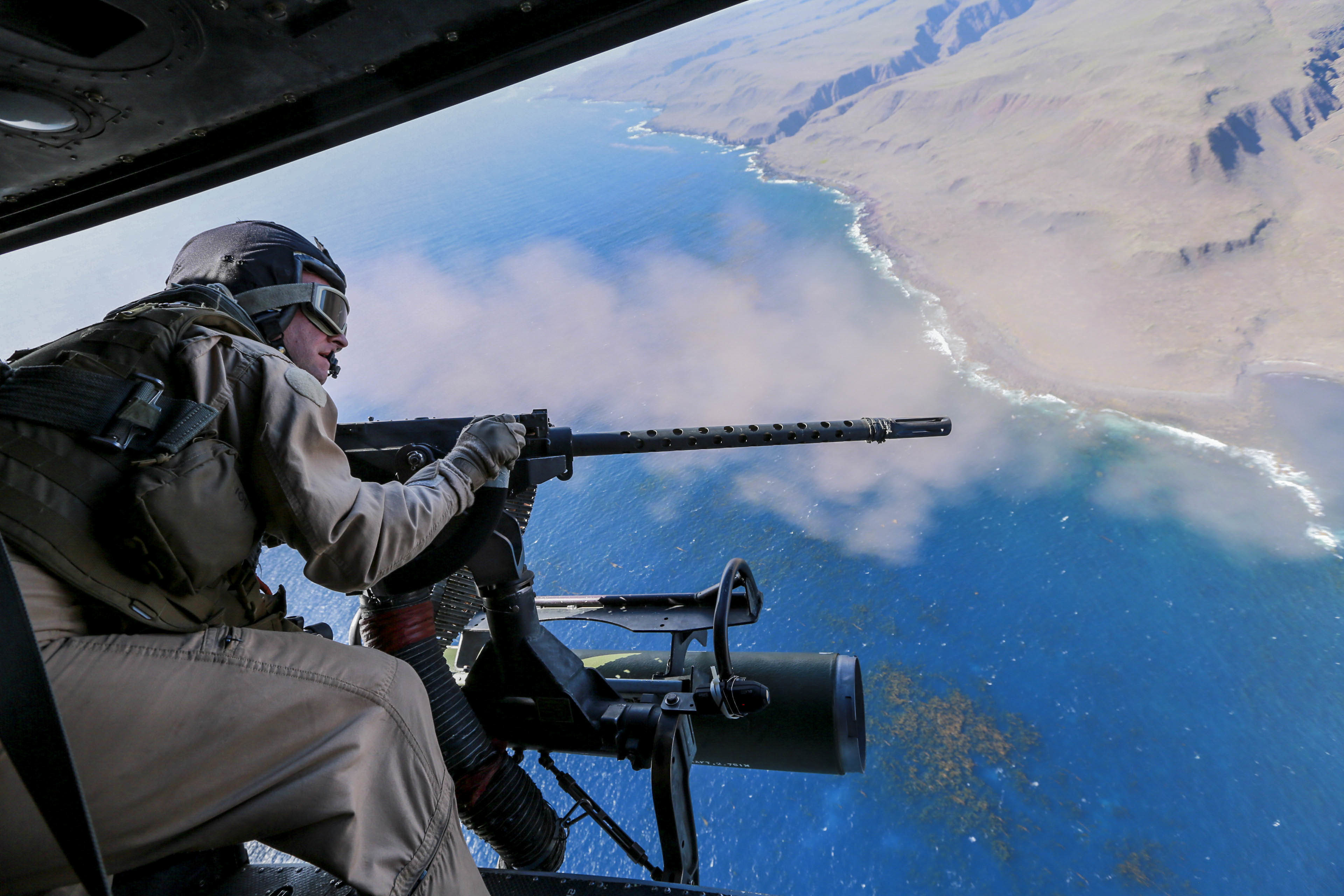
- A Marine engages targets from a UH-1Y Venom with VMM-161 during Composite Training Unit Exercise (COMPTUEX) above San Clemente Island

Site information
- Type: Naval Auxiliary Landing Field
- Owner: Department of Defense
- Operator: US Navy
- Controlled by: Navy Region Southwest
- Condition: Operational
- Website: Official website

Location
- Location in the United States
- Coordinates: 33°01′22″N 118°35′19″W

Site history
- Built: 1937
- In use: 1937 – present

Garrison information
- Current commander: Captain John DePree

Airfield information
- Identifiers: ICAO: KNUC, FAA LID: NUC, WMO: 722925
- Elevation: 56 metres (184 ft) AMSL
Runways
Direction	Length and surface
06/24	2,834.9 metres (9,301 ft) Concrete
Helipads
Number	Length and surface
H1	21.3 metres (70 ft) Concrete
H2	21.3 metres (70 ft) Concrete

Naval Auxiliary Landing Field (NALF) San Clemente Island (ICAO: KNUC, FAA LID: NUC), also known as Frederick Sherman Field, is a military airport located on San Clemente Island in Los Angeles County, California, United States. It has been owned by the United States Navy since 1937.

San Clemente Island is the southernmost Channel Island, covering 57 square miles (150 km^{2}). The island is approximately 21 nautical miles (39 kilometres) long and is 4.5 nmi (8.3 km) across at its widest point. It lies 55 nmi (102 km) south of Long Beach and 68 nmi (126 km) west of San Diego.

== Operations ==
One of the primary military functions of San Clemente has been to support research and development of many of the Navy's weapon systems. In 1939, the Navy developed the first Landing Craft, Vehicle and Personnel (LCVP) "Higgins Boat" at SCI. This was the beginning of the Naval Amphibious Force, which was one of the key factors in the outcome of World War II.

Today SCI's primary function is twofold: to support tactical training of the Pacific Fleet, and to continue as a key research and development facility. SCI provides the Navy and Marine Corps a multi-threat warfare training range. A major part of Navy training takes place on the ranges right off the SCI shores. The primary range covers over 149,000 square miles (390,000 km^{2}) and is the Navy's busiest fleet airspace. Also included in this training area are two mine exercise areas, the Southern California Anti-Submarine Warfare Range, seven submarine areas, the shallow water Undersea Training Range, and two laser training ranges. In total, SCI is a unique combination of airfields, airspace and ranges unlike any other facility owned by the Navy. It is the only location in the Pacific where surface ships, submarines, aircraft and Navy expeditionary forces can train in all warfare areas simultaneously using shore gunnery, bombardment, air defense, antisubmarine and electronic warfare.

The station was designated as the Frederick C. Sherman Field on 11 January 1961, in honor of Vice Admiral Frederick C. Sherman, a three-time recipient of the Navy Cross.

== Environment ==
To reduce the use of diesel fuel and prevent harmful emissions, the Naval facility on San Clemente Island installed three 225 kilowatt wind turbines. From February 1998 to April 2000, the turbines produced two GWh, approximately 13 percent of the island's total electricity needs. In FY99, the turbines helped the installation decrease consumption of 141,757 US gallons (537 m^{3}) of No. 2 diesel fuel, and avoided 18,450 pounds (8,369 kg) of carbon monoxide emissions. In the future, the turbines should provide 15 percent or more of the island's electricity, further reducing diesel fuel use and emissions.

== See also ==
- San Clemente Naval Auxiliary Air Station
