= A-scan ultrasound biometry =

Diagnostic test used in optometry or ophthalmology

- Purpose: diagnostic test used in optometry

A-scan ultrasound biometry, commonly referred to as an A-scan (short for Amplitude scan), uses an ultrasound instrument for diagnostic testing. A-scan biometry measures the axial length (AL) of the eye prior to cataract surgery in order to assess the refractive power of the intraocular lens that will be implanted.

== See also ==
- B-scan ultrasonography
- Ultrasonography
