= Western Electric System 1393 Radar Course Directing Central =

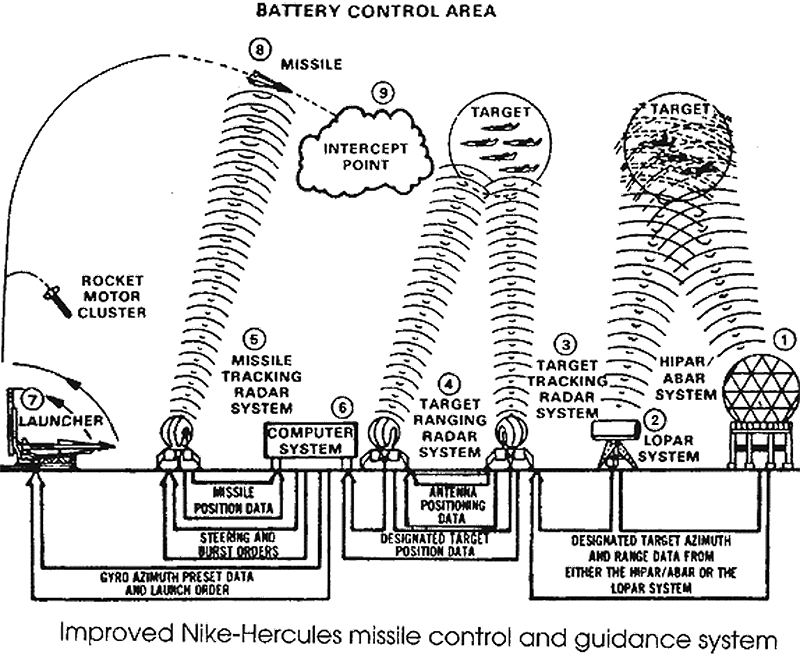
RCDC functional diagram depicting Target Ranging Radar (TRR)

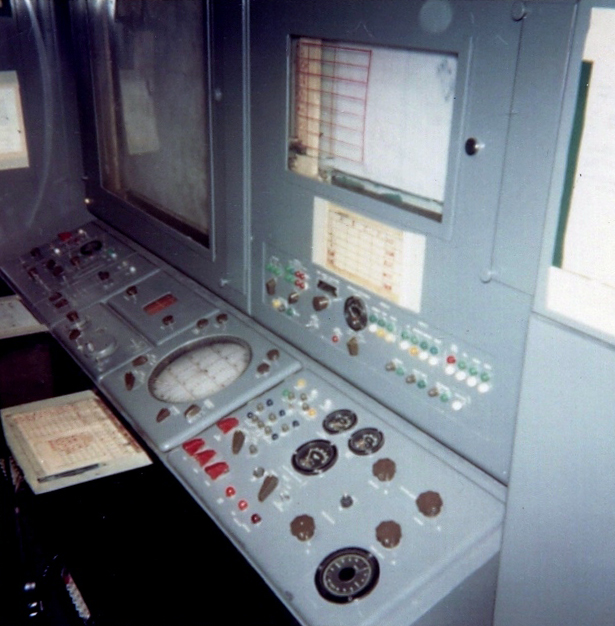
"The battery control officer continually survey[ed] the tactical situation on the plan position indicator" (large circular scope with light face). The acquisition radar operator was to the left of the BCO and the computer operator was on the right. Separate stations at the "target radar control console" and "missile radar control console" were also used. The later Anti Tactical Ballistic Missile (ATBM) version of the battery control console was slightly different.

The Western Electric System 1393 Radar Course Directing Central (RCDC) was a Cold War complex of radar/computer systems within the overall Improved Nike Hercules Air Defense Guided Missile System (separate from the missiles, storage and launch equipment, and command post equipment). The RCDC was installed at the "battery control areas" (Integrated Fire Control areas) of ~5 hectares (12 acres) each which was for commanding a nearby missile Launching Area (LA), firing a missile from the LA, and guiding a launched missile to a burst point near an enemy aircraft.

== Description ==
The Radar Course Directing Central included a defense acquisition radar ("ACQR" e.g., General Electric AN/MPQ-43 High Power Acquisition Radar), a Target Tracking Radar (TTR), and a radar/computer subsystem for controlling the MIM-14 Nike-Hercules. The RCDC Director's Console with 4 cabinets included the electro-mechanical Servo Computer Cabinet with the analog ballistics computer ("Intercept Computer") which calculated the relative location of a launched Nike missile (measured by a Missile Tracking Radar, MTR) to the TTR track of an enemy aircraft or formation. After launch, the ground-controlled interception algorithm guided the missile to a calculated point where the missile was detonated and conventional warhead fragments (3 HE warheads) or a nuclear warhead's blast were to neutralize the target. The Central also had a mode for surface-to-surface missions to airburst a nuclear Hercules over a ground target, and the RCDC included a Missile Motion Generator to simulate a Nike trajectory. After the 10 Army Air Defense Command Posts with Missile Master bunkers were operational in December 1960, battery control areas also had an AN/TSQ-8 Firing Unit Interface Facility for the automated data link (ADL) of digital information between the RCDC and the AADCP's Martin AN/FSG-1 Antiaircraft Defense System.

Personnel of the Nike "Fire Control Platoon" at the RCDC included the Battery Control Officer (BCO), IFC crewmen (specialty 16C20 such as Acquisition Radar crewman, TTR elevation operator, MTR Fireman, etc.), Nike Radar and Computer Repairmen (23N2P), etc.

=== Transportability ===
As with preceding Nike fire control systems, the Improved Hercules van trailers (e.g., by Fruehauf Trailer Co.) allowed the RCDC to be transported after the military installation was disemplaced from the station. Van trailers included:

- M381A1 Electronic Shop
- M424E1 Guided Missile Director Station
- M428E1 Guided Missile Tracking Station
- XM446 Radar signal simulator
- M564, M564A1, M564A2 Shop equipment (3 trailers for "Improved Hercules")

== History ==
The Radar Course Directing Central was an outgrowth of the July 1945 Signal Corps' Project 414A's planned Fire Direction Center System and a 1950 prototype computer and console system. Contractor evaluation of the first fire control system for Nike was from January–May 1953, and the "prototype model battery" system for the Nike Ajax was delivered to White Sands Proving Ground on May 15, 1953.

The RCDC was an improved fire control system for the Hercules missile based on a 1952 Ordance Corps study for an advanced attack system (Hercules design studies began in February 1953, and personnel training began in 1956). The "Improved Hercules system" was first deployed in 1961 and had "tracking, guidance, and interception" improvements by "modifying or replacing radar and electronics equipment".

Plans for the subsequent "Target Intercept Computer" for the Nike Zeus missile ("Athena" by Sperry Rand) had begun by 1958, (cancelled 1961) and the Nike-X (with Spartan/Sprint missiles) Central Logic and Control was authorized in 1963. The latter Sentinel/Safeguard Programs were never implemented except for Safeguard sites around the Grand Forks AFB missile silos, and RCDCs were deactivated during the 1974 Project Concise end of Project Nike after the 1971-2 SALT I Anti-Ballistic Missile Treaty.

== External media ==
External images
- Viewed from left of battery control console
- Closeup of PPI display
