= Ground Equipment Facility J-36A =

FAA radar station

- Part of 1951: Air Defense Command; 1960: United States Navy c. 1998: Joint Surveillance System
- Locations USAF station: 3.7 mi (6.0 km) SSE of landing field USN/FAA radar: Mount Thirst USGS activity: tbd

Site information
- Type: radar station
- Code: ADC: LP-39, P-39; USGS: D-4-66-SC; JSS: J-36A
- Controlled by: United States Air Force

Location
- Coordinates: 32°58′37″N 118°33′10″W (AFS); 32°53′04.95″N 118°27′04.05″W (ARSR-4)

Site history
- Built: 1951
- In use: ADC: 1951-1960; USGS: 1966; USN: 1972-present

Garrison information
- Garrison: 670th Aircraft Control and Warning Squadron

San Clemente Island is the location of an ARSR-4

Ground Equipment Facility J-36A (San Clemente Island Air Force Station until 1960) is a Federal Aviation Administration (FAA) radar station of the Joint Surveillance System (JSS) in the Western Air Defense Sector (WADS) of NORAD.

== History ==
In World War II, Los Angeles Harbor Defenses included posts on some islands of Southern California, e.g. in March 1942, "a 200-man Army detachment set up two radar stations" on San Clemente Island, and in March 1944, Navy "Seabees built two permanent radar installations on the island."

=== USAF radar station ===
San Clemente Island Air Force Station was Permanent System radar station LP-39 which began operations in November 1951 with an AN/TPS-1C general surveillance radar. Designated as one of two offshore radar stations at the Southern California coast, the 670th Aircraft Control and Warning Squadron was activated at the station on 1 February 1952 by the 27th Air Division. As an AC&W radar station, the facility provided radar tracks for a Manual Air Defense Control Center to direct Ground control interception (GCI) of unidentified aircraft.

The Air Force Station was upgraded to designation P-39 with a single AN/FPS-3 radar in May 1952 and an AN/FPS-4 height-finding radar the following year. In 1955 an AN/FPS-8 was added and subsequently converted to an AN/GPS-3 and in 1956, an AN/FPS-6 height-finder replaced the AN/FPS-4. As with other Air Defense Command stations replaced by facilities of the joint-use site system (JUSS), San Clemente Island AFS was replaced in 1960, and 670th operations moved to the JUSS RP-39 station at San Pedro Hill AFS with barracks at Fort MacArthur near the Project Nike direction center (part of the Los Angeles Air Defense Area).

In 1960, San Clemente Island transferred to the Navy and the USAF operations building was subsequently used as a Navy photo lab (the AFS site is vacant, deteriorating and difficult to reach.)

=== USGS radar station ===
In 1966 (July 30-August 9), field activity D-4-66-SC of the United States Geological Survey in the Coastal and Marine Geology Program used San Clemente Island with a Western Electric M-33 radar for a study of the Bathymetry and Structure of San Clemente Island (e.g., the "CURV vehicle of Naval Undersea Research and Development Center, was...used for seafloor sampling.")

=== Mount Thirst radar station ===
In 1972 south of the former AFS, the Navy installed an AN/FPS-20 general surveillance radar at Mount Thirst (32°53′03″N 118°27′03″W). The FPS-20 was later modified to an AN/FPS-93A in an Arctic Tower for range safety and bombing exercises.

==== Joint Surveillance System ====
In the late 1990s, an Air Route Surveillance Radar (ARSR-4) radar at Mount Thirst replaced the AN/FPS-93A, and is now shared with the Air Force for the JSS program (the FAA maintains the radar for the Navy, but reportedly does not use the data).

=== Station Tombstone ===
The late 1980s Station Tombstone Radar, an AN/SPS-73 surface search radar, is located north of Mt. Thirst.
