= Fort Heath =

US seacoast military installation for defense

- Part of Harbor Defenses of Boston
- location: Winthrop Highlands at Grovers Cliff
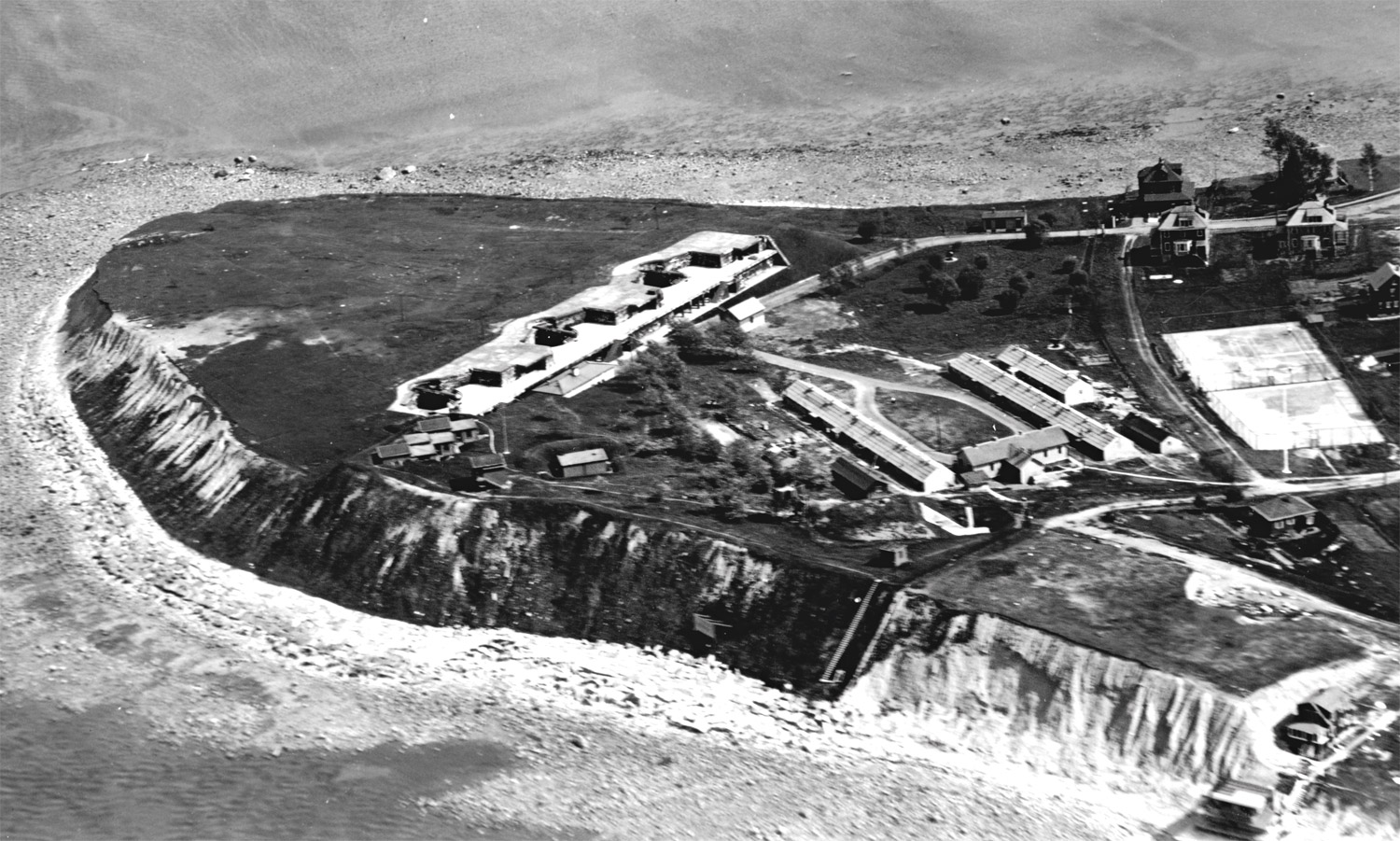
- Southeastward view with the face of Grovers Cliff along foreground shore, large rectangular white area on west (right). Pictured items not on the 1921 map include the roads through the barracks area connecting to the off-post intersection that is now the Highland Av & Pond St intersection (right).

Site information
- Type: coastal artillery site and radio/radar station eponym: General William Heath (Continental Army) namesake: Fort Heath Apartments
- Owner: private and municipal
- Condition: private apartment complex and municipal park

Location
- Location in Massachusetts
- Coordinates: 42°23′19″N 70°58′09″W

Site history
- Built: c. 1898
- In use: 1898–1966
- Demolished: 1947 – buildings 1969 – control site tbd – nuclear bunker 1979–1980 – FAA radar & building
- Battles/wars: World War I World War II; Cold War

Fort Heath was a US seacoast military installation for defense of the Boston and Winthrop Harbors with an early 20th-century Coast Artillery fort, a 1930s USCG radio station, prewar naval research facilities, World War II batteries, and a Cold War radar station. The fort was part of the Harbor Defenses of Boston (Coast Defenses of Boston 1913–1925) and was garrisoned by the United States Army Coast Artillery Corps. The fort's military structures have been replaced by a residential complex, including the luxurious Forth Heath Apartments, and recreation facilities of Small Park, which has both a commemorative wall and an historical marker for Fort Heath.

== Grover's Cliff Military Reservation ==
The Grover Cliff geodetic survey station marker was emplaced in 1847 (42°23′22.79″N 070°58′08.643″W, lost by 1922), and the military site was renamed Grover's Cliff Military Reservation in 1895. November 1890 planning for the military site was for 3 artillery rifles and 16 mortars, and by spring 1898 Lieutenant Sewail was in charge of construction. A spur of the Boston, Revere Beach and Lynn Railroad was built to the site by 29 March, bids for lumber were received in April, and the "Winthrop Mortar Batteries" of the regular army (Battery F and Battery M) were ordered to Grovers Cliff in May 1898 for the 16 mortars, with the batteries encamping 16 May on Cherry Street in Boston. Constructed during the Endicott modernization period for fortifications, "the first concrete foundation for one of the disappearing guns at Grovers Cliff" was complete in May 1898, and in 1900 the installation was renamed Fort Heath.

== Battery Theodore Winthrop ==
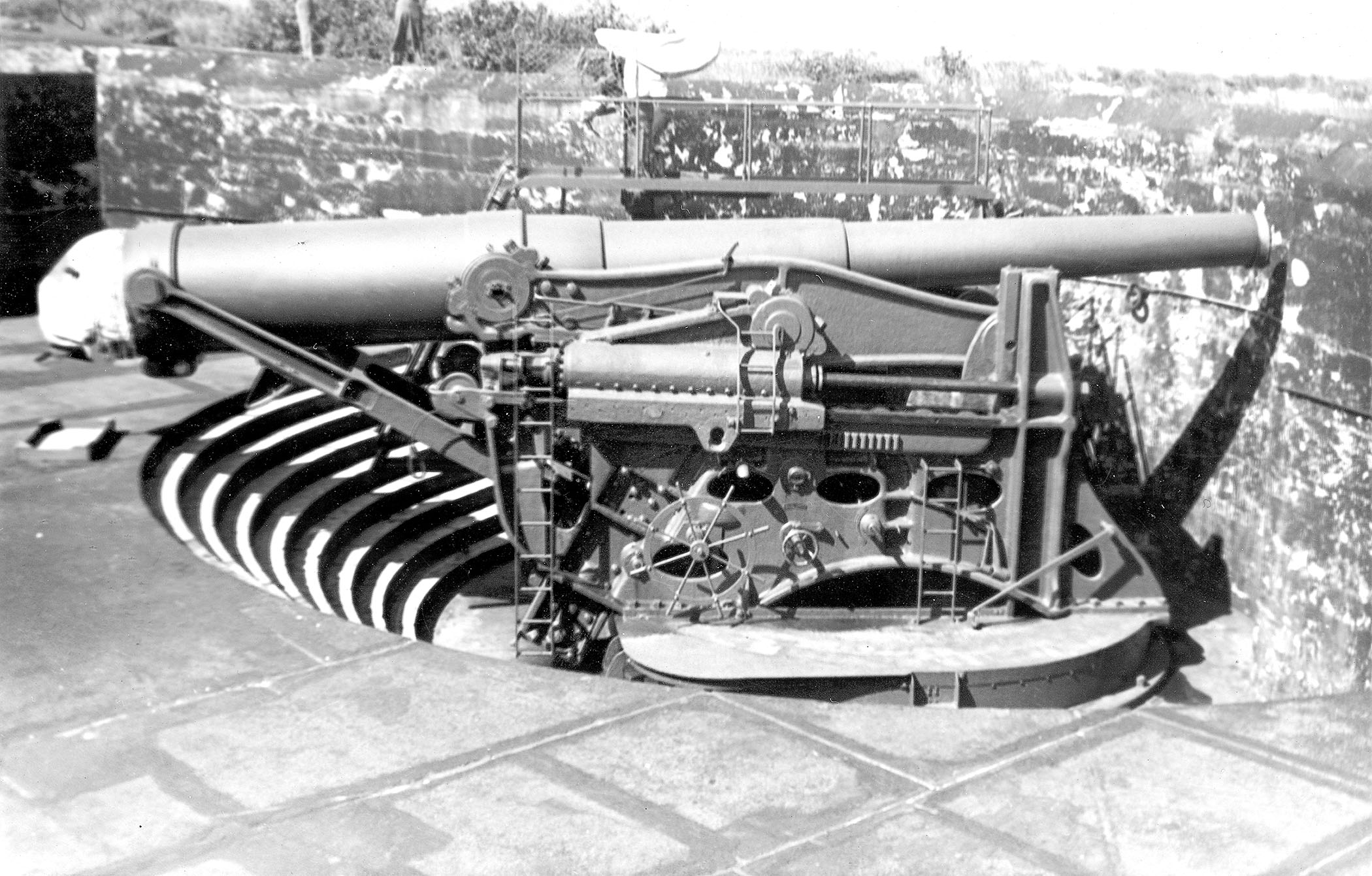
This disappearing carriage at Battery Alexander or Battery Bloomfield at Fort Hancock, New Jersey (above) was the same model (M1896) as at Ft Heath, and the recessed gun pits were similar. The 12-in gun (top) is an M1888.

Battery Theodore Winthrop construction was complete by 1901 with three 12-inch M1888 guns on M1896 disappearing carriages, the heaviest guns in the United States Army Coast Artillery Corps at the time. "Major Morris of the Seventh Heavy Artillery" was the initial commander, and "Batteries P and O of the Regular Army" manned the guns. Additional land was considered in 1901 for a Fort Heath garrison (temporary barracks were on the west side in 1921), and the fort was inspected by the Ordnance Department in 1902.

Fort Heath was a secondary station for a 1907 naval exercise, and in 1908 the Massachusetts Volunteer Militia had a Fort Heath unit. In 1908 the fort had a "range-finders house" and a sea wall was considered (constructed on the south shore by February 1921). In 1917 a "duct line" between Fort Banks and Fort Heath was contracted to New England Telephone and Telegraph, and for 3 batteries—Winthrop and Battery Kellogg & Battery Lincoln at Ft Banks—Ft Heath had the primary base end stations and the Battery Commanders' stations (a commander's station was atop the Fort Heath parapet).

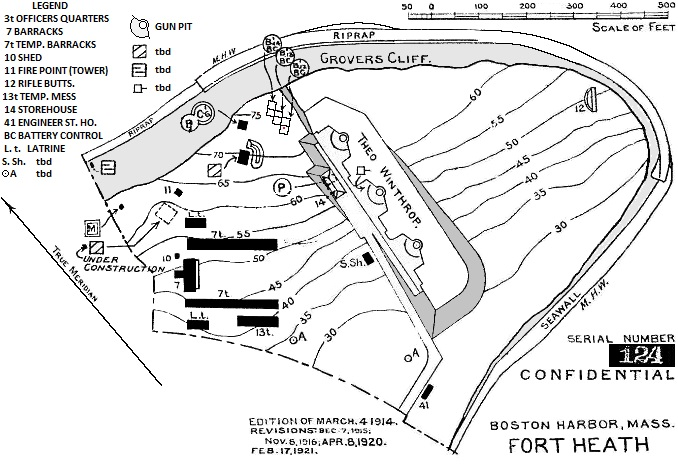
Fort Heath map of "FEB. 17, 1921" with added modern annotation to "roughly" indicate a former survey marker in the roof of the southernmost of the "BC" buildings (top—6 small adjoining blocks).

After the 1925 renaming of the Coast Defenses of Boston to the Harbor Defenses of Boston, the fort's ammunition hoists were authorized for disposal in January 1932. A federal survey marker ("MY0121—GROVERS") was set in the roof of the southernmost of the three fire control buildings at the fort in line at the northern end of Battery Winthrop. The marker on the "BC" (battery control) structure is roughly indicated on the 1921 map. Gun No. 3 (the most westerly one) of Battery Winthrop was about 120 ft. southeast of this marker, and the line between this gun and Gun No. 1 (the most easterly one) was 270 ft. in length.

== Coast Guard radio station ==
The United States Coast Guard radio station at Fort Heath (call sign "NMF") opened on 12 November 1931, and was initially used for testing "traffic…relayed from Point Bonita, California." The station had three 50-foot masts in 1934 (e.g., "Heath Northwest Radio Mast") but as a trial for determining if Navy facilities could instead handle USCG radio traffic, the "station at Winthrop" closed from 1934 to 1936. Subsequently, operating "until 1939 when the site was taken over by the Army", the USCG equipment "relocated to a former intelligence monitoring station at North Truro, Massachusetts."

== AA Battery No. 4 ==
Antiaircraft Battery No. 4 was designated in 1935 after the third gun pad was constructed in 1934 for 3-inch (76 mm) AA guns. The first two gun pads were built during World War I. The three emplacements were south of a surveillance radar and west of the "Theo. Winthrop" foundations, and the three guns were approved on 8 January 1942 to be moved to Fort Ruckman.

== Navy Field Test Station ==
The United States Navy Field Test Station, Fort Heath, was established by 1938 and included a Massachusetts Institute of Technology research facility for "fire-control systems" (cf. Army Signal Corps radar research at the Twin Lights station at the New Jersey Highlands).

One of the systems tested at the station was the first prototype of the Gun Fire-Control System Mark 56 (GFCS Mk56). This was an integrated anti-aircraft fire control system for the navy that was officially requested by the Bureau of Ordnance in a letter dated May 18th 1943, requesting the start of Project NO-166. This first prototype was installed at Fort Heath which was the operational site for Division 8 of the MIT Radiation Laboratory. Division 8 was known as the fire control radar section of the laboratory. The system was provided with a twin 5-inch/38 calibre gun turret from The United States Navy. The director assembly was mounted onto a trolley. Full testing was performed at the station but NO live firing took place. The installation drew a lot of interest from naval officers. One of these officers was Commander Robert Burroughs from the Office of the Chief of Naval Operations who visited the station. His support of the project led to Admiral King ordering that fifty of the Mark 56 be produced initially. A second prototype was then installed onto a destroyer at the Boston Navy Yard.

== AMTB Battery 945 ==
Anti-Motor Torpedo Boat Battery 945 at the eastern tip of Fort Heath (42.388281°N 70.966822°W) covered the northern harbor approaches with a pair of 90 mm Anti-Motor Torpedo Boat (AMTB) guns, and the HHB 3rd Battalion of the 9th Coast Artillery Regiment was activated at Fort Heath on 1 June 1941. From September–November 1941 the camouflage training school for the First Coast Artillery District was conducted by the Corps of Engineers at Fort Heath. Gun No. 1 (42.387972°N 70.967081°W) was north of the second gun, and Battery 945 was declared surplus on 28 December 1943 (a very large apartment building is on the Battery 945 position.)

== Cold War radar station ==
The Fort Heath radar station was a NORAD Control Center of the United States Air Force and US Army from 1960–9 for coordinating interceptors of the Boston Air Defense Sector and Project Nike surface-to-air missiles of the Boston and Providence Defense Areas. From 1959 to 1962 the 820th Radar Squadron, which was renamed an Aircraft Control and Warning Squadron in 1961, operated the Air Force portion of the facility. The station also had an FAA ARSR-1A Air Route Surveillance Radar, and the air defense control site was demolished in 1969 (the bunker remained in 1971), and after a Rhode Island AN/TSQ-51 had opened by 1 July 1970, Project Concise closed the remaining Nike batteries in 1974.

== Small Park ==
The FAA operated the ARSR-1 until the mid-to-late 1990s, and by 2005, the "Fort Heath property" acquired by the town had been converted to a municipal park. The fort land is a Formerly Used Defense Site (MA19799F184300).

== See also ==
External images
- 1938 map with AAA emplacements
- 155 mm cannon under construction
- AMTB Battery 945

- 9th Coast Artillery (United States)
- 241st Coast Artillery (United States)
- Seacoast defense in the United States
- List of military installations in Massachusetts
