= Western Electric M-33 Antiaircraft Fire Control System =

- Country of origin: United States; Design: Bell Telephone Laboratories; Production: Western Electric; Operations: Army Anti-Aircraft Artillery Command (ARAACOM)
- Introduced
- Type: automatic tracking radar system for gun laying
- Range: 125,000 yd (62 nmi; 71 mi)
- Diameter: 8 ft Fresnel lens (1¼° pencil beam)
- Azimuth: 360° (6400 mils)
- Elevation: -10⅛° to +90° ("-180 mils to +1,600 mils")

The Western Electric M-33 Antiaircraft Fire Control System ("M-33 fire-control system", "Antiaircraft Fire Control System M33", "AA FCS M33") was an X-Band "Gunfire Control Radar", for aiming antiaircraft artillery by computer control. Developed for mobility via 3 trailers, the "M-33 system could compute, for the 90-mm. and 120-mm. guns, firing data for targets with speeds up to 1,000 mph", and for targets at 120,000 yards (68 mi) had similar gun laying accuracy as "SCR-584 type radars" at 70,000 yards (40 mi). The system included a telescopic "target selector" on a tripod near the guns for additional measurement of aircraft "azimuth and elevation data [to] be transmitted to the computer and utilized as gun directing data."

The M-33 was deployed overseas and as part of the CONUS "manual air defense system" for which Army Air Defense Command Posts telephoned foe aircraft information to the M-33 units which used its surveillance board to mark targets using grease pencil.

== Development and deployment ==
In 1944, the US Army contracted for an electronic "computer with guns, a tracking radar, plotting boards and communications equipment" (M33C & M33D models used different subassemblies for 90 & 120 mm gun/ammunition ballistics.) The "trial model predecessor" (T-33) was used as late as 1953, and the production M33 (each $383,000 in 1954 dollars) had been deployed in 1950. The 34th AAA Brigade's 90mm guns were converted to the M-33 by December 3, 1954, after the 95th AAA Brigade had been upgraded. Aberdeen Proving Ground and Fort Bliss were training posts for M-33 personnel, and by 1957 there were 3 Ordnance Detachments in Germany for M33 Integrated Fire Control Repair—150th (Wiesbaden), 151st (Mannheim), & 152nd (Kaiserslautern) Ord Det (IFCR); and functional test sites included the White Sands Proving Ground ranges (e.g., "Hueco Range No. 3). The M33 was also used for satellite tracking in 1961.

== Successors ==
By December 1955 the T38 Antiaircraft Fire Control System with T9 radar tracker and T27 computer (variant E2) had been developed for the "completely integrated antiaircraft weapon designated as the Skysweeper" with T84 75-mm AA guns. The M-33 was later "utilized as a basic building block" by Strategic Air Command for the early 1960s Reeves AN/MSQ-35 Bomb Scoring Central (the M33 tracking console was used for the Vietnam War's AN/MSQ-77, AN/TSQ-81, & AN/TSQ-96 Bomb Directing Centrals).

M-33s were later used for geological/meteorological research (1966 San Clemente Island, 1978 Winston Field, Penn State, Univ of Wyoming, & 1963 Austin.

== See also ==
- List of radars
