= Grovers Cliff =

- Escarpment
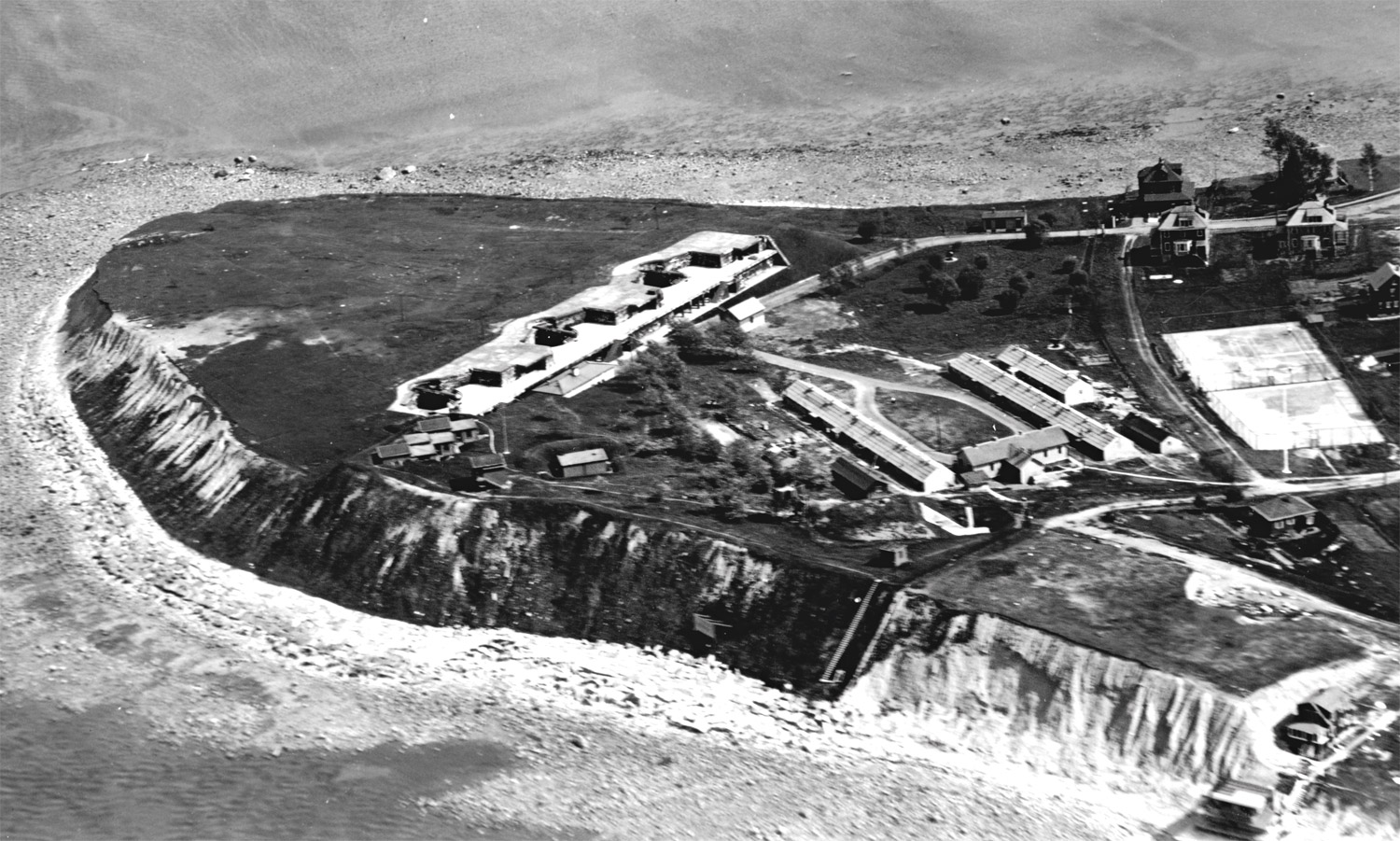
- Southeastward view of Grovers Cliff c. 1930 with Fort Heath

- Coordinates: 42°23′25″N 070°58′08″W
- Location: Massachusetts, United States
- Geology: Escarpment & Headland

Grovers Cliff is a shoreline escarpment at Broad Sound near the Port of Boston and by extension, the landform extending into the sea (headland) that is the "Highlands" section of Winthrop, Massachusetts. The headland is at the north end of Winthrop Beach and is noted for an 1847 survey station, WWI & II fortifications and a Cold War nuclear bunker used by the US Army, USCG, USN, USAF, and FAA as Fort Heath, the eponym of the landform's current apartment complex. A northern area of the headland is the municipal Small Park and the remainder is primarily the Fort Heath Apartments. Streets include Highland Avenue and Pond Street which had been constructed by the 1930s at the perimeter of Fort Heath.
