= Combat Skyspot =

Part of Second Indochina War

- Part of Second Indochina War (Vietnam • Laos • Cambodia); Arc Light
- Type: Ground-directed bombing operation
- Location: Sites in Laos, South Vietnam, Thailand
- Commanded by: United States Air Force (USAF); United States Marine Corps (USMC)
- Target: Cambodia, North Vietnam, South Vietnam, Thailand
- Date: 1965–1973
- Executed by: 7th Air Force coordinator: Lt Col Robert C. Seitzberg; 1CEVG Det. 15; LS-85: Lt Col Gerald Clayton; USMC
- Casualties: At least 21, additional remains identified killed

Combat Skyspot was the ground-directed bombing (GDB) operation of the Vietnam War by the United States Air Force using Bomb Directing Centrals and by the United States Marine Corps using Course Directing Centrals ("MSQ-77 and TPQ-10 ground radars"). Combat Skyspot's command guidance of B-52s and tactical fighters and bombers—"chiefly flown by F-100's"—at night and poor weather was used for aerial bombing of strategic, close air support, interdiction, and other targets. Using a combination radar/computer/communications system ("Q" system) at operating location in Southeast Asia, a typical bombing mission (e.g., during Operation Arc Light with a "cell" of 3 Boeing B-52 Stratofortresses) had an air command post turn over control of the mission to the radar station, and the station provided bomb run corrections and designated when to release bombs.

Planning of Vietnam GDB missions included providing coordinates with 10 m (11 yd) accuracy to the radar sites, handoff of the bomber from air controllers (e.g., a DASC) to the site, tracking the aircraft by radiating the bomber (e.g., activating the 400 Watt Motorola SST-181 X Band Beacon Transponder), and radioing of technical data from the aircrew to the radar site such as the airspeed/heading for the central to estimate wind speed on the bomb(s). With the bomber near a designated "Initial Point" the GDB site would begin a radar track (Bomb Directing Centrals would calculate a computer track and solve the "bomb problem" for the aircraft position.)

For B-52 missions the site personnel verbally transmitted guidance commands to the aircraft crew by radio (lead aircraft for multi-ship formations) to adjust the flight path toward an eventual release point for the actual bomb(s). Site personnel verbally directed release of the ordnance from the aircraft by voice countdown. This was a manual process requiring training, practice and adherence to procedure. Both the site and aircrew were authorized to "withhold" release at any point if doubt arose. All communications were tape recorded by the aircrew for post strike debriefing.

== Development ==
Similar to World War II GDB and Korean War GDB, Combat Skyspot was planned during 1965 development of the Reeves AN/MSQ-77 Bomb Directing Central with a new integrating ballistic computer using vacuum tubes to continually compute the bomb release point during the bomb run (the USMC AN/TPQ-10 directed aircraft to a predetermined release point). Planning for the USAF vacuum-tube trajectory computer/radar system began in early 1965 and in October 1965, F-100s tested the AN/MSQ-77 at Matagorda Island General Bombing and Gunnery Range on the Texas Gulf Coast (the Matagorda training unit was later moved to Bergstrom Air Force Base). In 1967 a helicopter-transportable variant of the AN/MSQ-77 in rigid shelters (AN/TSQ-81) was developed for Commando Club bombing of northern North Vietnam targets (Red River Delta), and in 1969 training for an additional transportable variant with tower-mounted antenna and digital computer (AN/TSQ-96) was being conducted at the Reeves Instrument Corporation in New York. "In March 1966 the first MSQ-77 arrived at Bien Hoa" Air Base ("activated" April 1 to use the "reverse MSQ method".)

Vietnam War ground-directed bombing sites
| site (call sign) | location | accuracy | notes |
| OL-21 MACON | Bien Hoa Air Base | 238 ft (73 m) | |
| OL-22 BONGO | Pleiku | 256 ft (78 m) | |
| OL-23 LID | Nakhon Phanom RTAFB later Udorn RTAFB | 322 ft (98 m) | AN/MSQ-77, c. 1969 AN/TSQ-96 |
| OL-24 MILKY | Đông Hà Combat Base, Hue-Phu Bai, Monkey Mountain (Da Nang) | 291 ft (89 m) | overrun March 31, 1972 |
| OL-25 TEEPEE | Dalat, later Ubon RTAFB | | |
| OL-26 | Binh Thuy Air Base, RVN | 222 ft (68 m) | |
| OL-27 BROMO | Nakhon Phanom RTAFB | | 1967 AN/TSQ-81 |
| LS-85 WAGER CONTROL | mountaintop of Phou Pha Thi | | 1967-8 AN/TSQ-81 (destroyed 10 March 1968) |
| Lima Site 44 PAULA | Salavan, Laos | | Channel 72 emplaced April 1966 |
| Skyline Ridge JANE | Long Tieng, Laos | | Channel 79 emplaced May 1966 |
| Lima Site 61 NORA | Muang Phalane, Laos | | Channel 77 emplaced 26 March 1967 |
| | | AN/TPQ-10 sites | |

== Operations ==
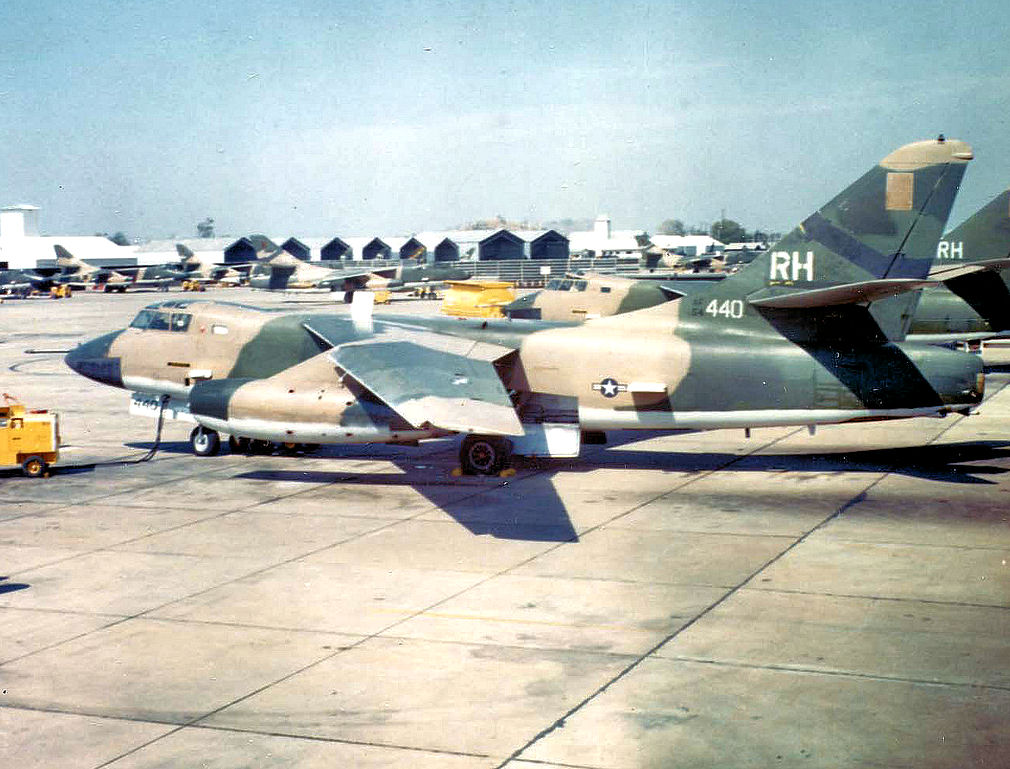
42d Tactical Electronic Warfare Squadron - Douglas EB-66E Destroyer

Combat Skyspot was first used "to support fighting ground troops" on July 2, 1966; and the initial 15,000 Skyspot sorties from March 1966-March 1967 included the respective 35%, 46%, and 54% "of the B-52D sorties flown" from July-December 1966, in January 1967, and in March 1967. Similar to the lead bomber for 3-ship B-52 missions, a North American F-100 Super Sabres could use Skyspot to act as a pathfinder for Republic F-105 Thunderchiefs. On July 3, 1966, "24-hour all-weather bombing [was] authorized against targets in Laos [using] MSQ-77 ground director bombing system (SKY SPOT)" and on July 5, "Quick Run" began with Skyspot airstrikes where "MACV could request priority targeting resulting in B-52D missions diverted from their primary targets prior to take off or after takeoff". In addition to Arc Light B-52 airstrikes, Skyspot was used against Cambodia targets of Operation Menu from Bien Hoa Air Base and by Operation Niagara. The Combat Skyspot "Operations Order (OPORD) 439–67" was published March 10, 1967; and notable battles using Skyspot include:

- 1967 Siege of "Con Thien": USMC AN/TPQ-10s were used for airstrikes (Operation Neutralize).
- 1968 Battle of Khe Sanh: a "B-52 from U Tapao carrying 108 500-pound bombs ran a test mission on 26 February, guided by Skyspot...and [on the 27th,] four missions were run close to the defenders at Khe Sanh. During March, 44 close-support sorties were run."
- 1971 battle at Tchepone: supporting a helicopter evacuation from a gunship crash site at Tchepone, Laos; the BROMO Skyspot site directed a B-52 cell using BONUS DEAL: the lead's tailgunner used his radar to keep a rear B-52 with faulty navigation in bombing formation. Another Skyspot mission of the operation, "Yankee 37, struck some 1400 yards from Marine lines and touched off secondary explosions" lasting over 2 hrs.
- 1972 First Battle of Quảng Trị: c. April 2, "ARVN...57th Regiment retreated across the Dong Ha bridge [and] the north end of the vehicular bridge was struck with a Skyspot airstrike and partly destroyed [but] still passable."
- 1972 Linebacker 1: April 9 raid on the Petroleum, Oil, Lubrication (POL) "stores and railyard at Vinh, North Vietnam".

Skyspot also supported Lockheed AC-130 gunships, BLU-82/B drops from MC-130 Commando Vault aircraft to clear landing zones, at least one helicopter evacuation of wounded on August 13, 1966, and "since many maps of South Vietnam contained distance errors of up to 300 meters", target surveying by tracking an observation aircraft flying circles around a target for plotting its coordinates. As with "loran-controlled photography" for target geolocation, Skyspot was also used for surveying during 'recce escort' missions, e.g., for Commando Club calibration with an RF-4C reconnaissance jet taking high speed target photos during a "Run for the Roses" ("almost guaranteed to produce copious SAM firings"). Interdiction occasionally used Skyspot to walk subsequent bombs onto a small target such as by Commando Nail forward air controller, e.g., to "hit a couple bull dozers ... The Fac would say [you got him pause nope he's back on the dozer, move your coordinates to the adjusted location]... It took 4 F-4 strikes to knock it out." "On 22 December 1968, RF-4Cs from the 12 and 16 TRS began flying bomb damage assessment missions to evaluate" Skyspot accuracy.

=== Commando Club ===
Commando Club/total missions by target area & period
| Period | North Vietnam | Barrel Roll "around" LS-85 | Both areas |
| November | 20/153 (13%) | 1/268 | 21/421 (5%) |
| December | 20/94 (21%) | 67/327 (20%) | 87/421 (21%) |
| January | 29/125 (55%) | 23/320 (10%) | 52/445 (12%) |
| February | 27/49 (55%) | 142/375 (38%) | 169/424 (40%) |
| March 1–10 | 3/6 (50%) | 165**/182 (91%) | 168/188 (89%) |
| Total | 99*/427 (20%) | 398/1472 (27%) | 497/1899 (26%) |
*The 99 Commando Club missions on NVN used ~500 sorties. (The last was on the Thai Nguyen RR yard.); **Only 153 of the March 1–10 Commando Club missions were on Laos targets.

Commando Club was a Combat Skyspot operation for ground-directed bombing of Red River Delta targets (Hanoi, Haiphong, etc.) out of range of the initial Combat Skyspot sites using a specialized radar emplaced by Heavy Green at one of the Laos Sites of the Vietnam War. The operation also bombed clandestine targets in the neutral Kingdom of Laos (e.g., for self-defense during the Battle of Route 602) using Detachment 1 personnel of the 1043rd Radar Evaluation Squadron performing AN/TSQ-81 operations as Lockheed civilians (volunteers discharged from the USAF for cover). Due to limited reliability of the AN/TSQ-81 radios, an intermediary aircraft (EC-121 or "usually a C-135...decoy ship") provided a "radio relay [and] surveillance/control channel" (callsign: WAGER) between the radar and the bomber.

==== Wager Control missions ====
The LS-85 radar with callsign "Wager Control" at 396.2 MHz and day/night shift crews of 5 men each became operational on November 1, 1967; and trial missions by Republic F-105 Thunderchiefs were led by Col. John C. Giraudo (355th Fighter Wing commander). F-105 Commando Club missions included the November 15, 1967, 357th Tactical Fighter Squadron bombing of Yên Bái Air Base in Route Package 5 ("no BDA possible") and the defeated November 18 raid of 16 F-105s of the 388th Tactical Fighter Wing—preceded by 4 F-105 Wild Weasels—on Phúc Yên Air Base (JCS Target 6). The latter mission's loss of 2 Wild Weasels to MiGs and then some of the bombers to SAM sites that tracked the USAF jamming resulted in temporary suspension of Commando Club until electronic countermeasures were improved. Through November 16, LS-85 had effected a direct hit (zero miss distance) as well as a 5 mi (8.0 km) miss: the Commando Club CEP for "14 runs was 867 feet" while other Skyspot sites for 1967 missions averaged 300–350 ft (91–107 m) error at ranges ≤100 nmi (190 km; 120 mi). LS-85 accuracy was improved during the suspension period, another UHF radio was added at the summit, and the radio relay's secondary task of surveilling for MiGs was eliminated.

Commando Club was resumed by November 21 when F-105s attacked the Yên Bái airfield (also on December 1 & 23, January 5, & February 11.) LS-85 directing bombings of Laos' Ban Phougnong truck park on December 22, a target "25 miles west of [LS-85's TACAN] Channel 97" on December 28, and "a target 20 miles east of San Neua" December 31; and "Commando Club under Wager Control" bombed the Kim Lo Army Barracks northwest of Hanoi on February 7, 1968, a Route Pack V target on February 11, and the "Phuc Yen (JCS 6) airfield" & "the Ban Nakay truck park in Northern Laos" on February 19. Arc Light B-52s and other aircraft also flew missions of Commando Club, which were 20% (less than 1 per day) of all bombing missions on North Vietnam targets during November 1 – March 10. Commando Club airstrikes against Laos targets included operations to interdict enemy advances on LS-85 such as the Battle of Route 602. "On 21 February the [Laos] Ambassador authorized the Local Area Defense Commander (alternately the senior CIA officer or the FAC) to use the TSQ radar to direct any and all strikes within 12 kilometers of the summit" and "between the 20th and 29th, 342 sorties hit within 30 kilometers of Phou Phathi." Commando Club operations during the Battle of Route 602 were part of the approximately 400 Commando Club missions out of the "1,472 BARREL ROLL Strike missions" flown "around" LS-85 from November 1 – March 10. Despite the bombing campaign, the enemy reached LS-85 and it was captured during the Battle of Lima Site 85 on March 10/11, 1968.

== Results ==
External image
- 1967 Dong Ha "SKY SPOT" entrance

The AN/TSQ-96 at Ubon RTAFB directed the "last Arc Light strike of the Indochinese conflicts...on August 15, 1973", and the last Vietnam War Skyspot mission was also from OL-25 (in December 1975 the TSQ-81 that had been at OL-23 was moved near Osan Air Base, Korea.) The AN/MSQ-77 averaged 300–350 ft (91–107 m) error for 1967 missions at ranges ≤100 nmi (190 km; 120 mi), and the AN/TPQ-10 had a CEP of 150 ft (46 m).^{far?]} For Route Package I sorties, the "major increase in high altitude MSQ-77 bombing was probably the most important reason for loss reduction" (fewer shoot downs), Casualties associated with Combat Skyspot included a Detachment 15 NCO killed in an enemy rocket attack, 6 of a site survey team killed in a 1966 ambush, and the 13 KIA of the Battle of Lima Site 85. In 1989, remains of an F-4C Weapon System Officer shot down during a November 10, 1967, AN/MSQ-77 bomb run were recovered in Southeast Asia, and US remains from the LS-85 battle were identified in 2005 & 2012. The Combat Skyspot Memorial on Andersen Air Force Base, Guam, identifies personnel killed in Southeast Asia (its AN/MSQ-77 antenna was destroyed by a typhoon c. 2007).
