= Lima Site 85 =

Covert U.S. installation in Laos (1967–1968)

- Houaphanh Province, Laos
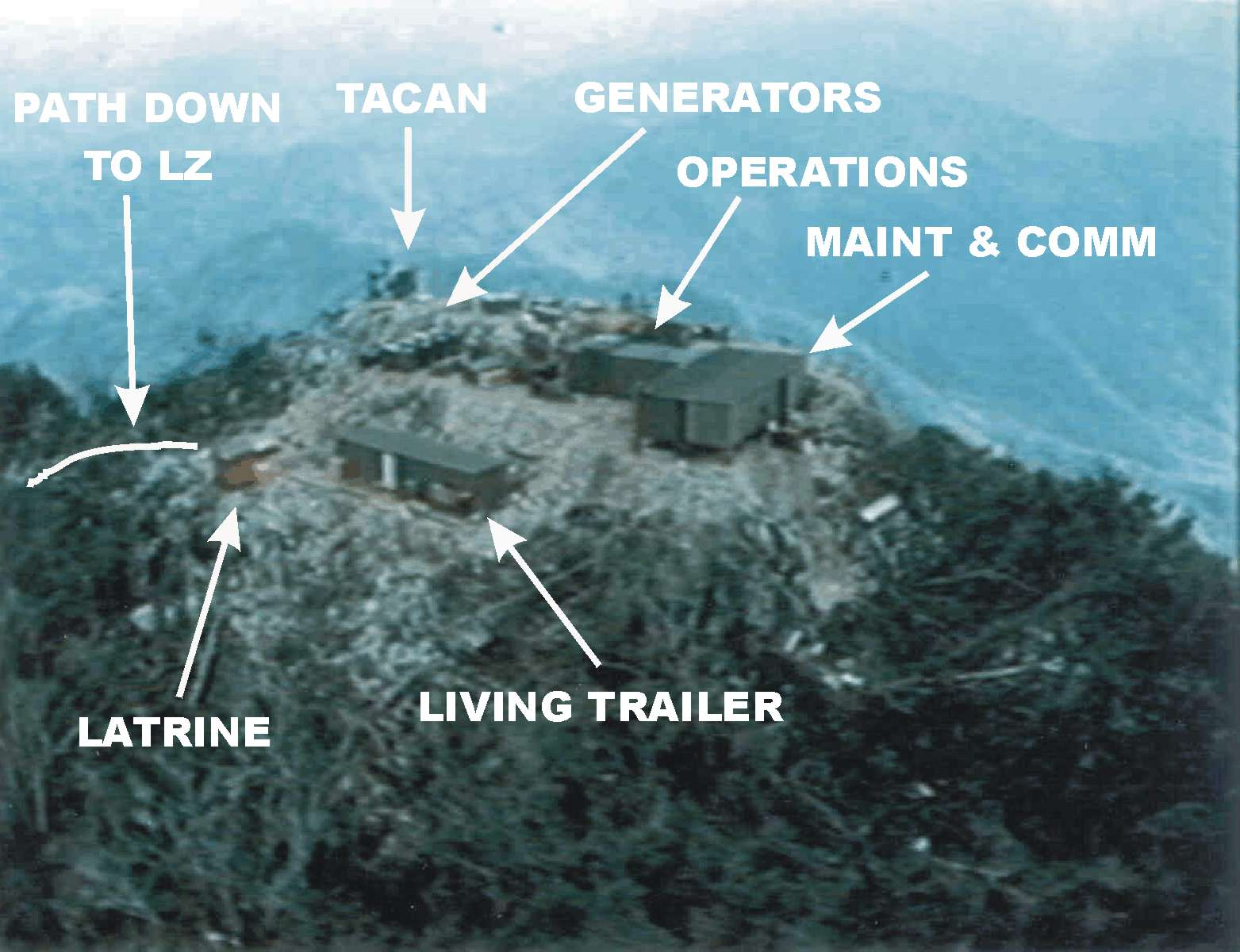
- The LS-85 mountaintop area included radar shelters ("Operations") with antennas and interior equipment normally in/on mobile AN/MSQ-77 "control and plotting" and radar vans. "TACAN" is the box shelter for the AN/TRN-17 electronics with antenna on top, and "LZ" is for the nearby helicopter Landing Zone. Also not shown are the CIA airstrip and command post.

Location
- Coordinates: 20°26′42″N 103°43′05″E

Site history
- Built: 1967
- Demolished: 1968

Lima Site 85 (LS-85 alphanumeric code of the phonetic 1st letter used to conceal this covert operation) was a clandestine military installation in the Royal Kingdom of Laos guarded by the Hmong "Secret Army", the Central Intelligence Agency, and the United States Air Force used for Vietnam War covert operations against communist targets in ostensibly neutral Laos under attack by the Vietnam People's Army. Initially created for a CIA command post to support a local stronghold, the site was expanded with a 1966 TACAN area excavated on the mountaintop where a 1967 command guidance radar was added for Commando Club bombing of northern areas of North Vietnam. The site ended operations with the Battle of Lima Site 85 when most of the U.S. technicians on the mountaintop were killed, including CMSgt Richard Etchberger. For his heroism and sacrifice, Etchberger received the Air Force Cross posthumously. The operation remained classified, however, and the existence of the award was not publicly acknowledged until 1998. After the declassification of LS 85 and a reevaluation of his actions, Etchberger was awarded the Medal of Honor in 2010.

== Command post ==
The LS-85 military installation began in August 1966 with TACAN radar installation at a supply site and command post for "Hmong officers and CIA paramilitary advisers [to control] harassing operations against the Pathet Lao and North Vietnamese". LS-85 was supplied via an "Air America STOL airstrip … two-thirds of the way down the mountain" and the command bunker was down the hill from the summit (identified by the North Vietnamese as the "communications center".) The airstrip was also used for refueling USAF rescue helicopters.

== TACAN ==
The tactical air navigation system (TACAN) equipment for Channel 97 at LS-85 was emplaced after Vietnam War Combat Skyspot sites had been created in March 1966 and several TACAN sites, including those at Lima Sites, had similarly been established for military aircraft navigation/guidance. The planned LS-85 TACAN site was surveyed in July 1966 (the Hmong flattened the summit and created a helicopter landing zone at lower elevation). The First Mobile Communications Group Team 72-66 deployed the 60 Hz diesel-powered MB5 Generator Set and 1 kilowatt ITT AN/TRN-17 Beacon-Transponder Set from Clark AFB to Udorn RTAFB in August 1966 via a C-123 cargo aircraft—then to the Sam Thong runway (LS-20) for transfer to Army CH-47 Chinooks which refueled later at Nakhang (LS-36) to complete the airlift to LS-85.

The LS-85 TACAN area with the AN/TRN-17, generator, diesel supply, and "Comm and Relay Center" was operating on September 24, 1966; and the portion of LS-85 serviced by the landing zone was supported (supplies, etc.) by Continental Air Services using PONY EXPRESS Sikorsky CH-3 helicopters (the USAF museum displays one used for LS-85.) Fuel drums for the MB5 were landed directly at the mountaintop.

== Combat Target ==
Combat Target was a March 1967 task force that recommended a Combat Skyspot site closer to Hanoi for more accurate bombing at night and during poor weather (endorsed by General Earle G. Wheeler on April 25, 1967.) In April 1967, Reeves Instrument Corporation was contracted to modify the trailer-mobile ("M") AN/MSQ-77 design to a helicopter transportable ("T") version without trailer chassis/wheels and other mobility equipment. The initial variant (AN/TSQ-81) was tested at Bryan Field, Texas, using bomb runs over Matagorda Island General Bombing and Gunnery Range and was emplaced for Combat Skyspot in Thailand. After Bryan/Matagorda testing of the 2nd AN/TSQ-81, it was operational at LS-85 in late 1967, the period when the "1st CEVG began "Combat Keel" tests using F-4s guided by an AN/MSQ-77 on the USS Thomas J. Gary in the Gulf of Tonkin to test command guidance by ships against northern targets (Gary after beginning by August 9, departed by December 12).

== Heavy Green ==
Heavy Green was the military operation to emplace a Reeves AN/TSQ-81 Bomb Directing Central on the LS-85 summit adjacent to the TACAN area particularly for monsoon season bombing of northern North Vietnam. The site's initial inspection regarding suitability for ground-directed bombing was by its eventual 7th AF coordinator, and geodetic surveying was by a 1st Combat Evaluation Group team staffed from existing Combat Skyspot operating locations. The site was developed under USAF Major Richard Secord (assisted by Tom Clines) by first "clearing additional space on the white karst limestone mountaintop" with blasting by a "Navy Seabee demolitions expert". Construction included leveling steel girders on vertical posts to allow a Corps of Engineers CH-47s to airlift the "new equipment, vans [rigid shelters], and prefab crew quarters". Defenses included a defensive bunker and an inner perimeter with outpost, and a frequency converter shelter provided the 3 phase 400 Hz power needed for precision pointing by the radar's antenna motors. The camouflaged Cassegrain antenna was on the roof of the operations shelter, while the connected shelter had a rotating identification friend or foe antenna and mast antennas for UHF and VHF communications. A calibration in September 1967 included an estimation of the AN/TSQ-81 antenna coordinates by "fly-in" using aircraft tracked by LS-85 while overflying previously-surveyed nearby peaks (surveyors at the peaks observed the flyover precision).

== Commando Club ==
Commando Club was a US operation of the Vietnam War that used command guidance of aircraft by the Laos Site 85 radar for ground-directed bombing (GDB) of targets in North Vietnam and clandestine targets in Laos. The Detachment 1, 1043rd Radar Evaluation Squadron, technicians and officers at LS-85 performed radar/computer/communications operations with the Reeves AN/TSQ-81 Bomb Directing Central as Lockheed civilians (volunteers discharged from the USAF for cover). The Combat Skyspot site used typical GDB procedures for Commando Club, including planning missions, providing coordinates to LS-85 and bomber crews, handoff of the bomber from air controllers to LS-85, tracking the aircraft by radiating the bomber's 400 Watt transponder, and radioing of technical data from the bomber such as the airspeed to LS-85 for the AN/TSQ-81 to estimate wind speed on the bomb(s). Due to limited reliability of the LS-85 radios (callsign "Wager Control" at 396.2 MHz), an intermediary aircraft (EC-121 or "usually a C-135…decoy ship") provided a "radio relay [and] surveillance/control channel" (callsign: WAGER) between LS-85 and the bomber.

With the bomber near a designated "Initial Point" LS-85 would begin a radar track and the Bomb Directing Central's analog computer would calculate a computer track and solve the "bomb problem" for the aircraft's flight path. The central then automatically transmitted guidance commands to the aircraft (lead aircraft for multi-ship formations, e.g., 3 Boeing B-52 Stratofortresses) to adjust the bomb run toward an eventual release point for the actual bomb(s). The central at LS-85 automatically effected release of the ordnance from the aircraft to eliminate the variable crewmember delay during the greater vulnerability of the generally steady bomb run.

Commando Club/total missions by target area & period
Period	North Vietnam	Barrel Roll "around" LS-85	Both areas
November	20/153 (13%)	1/268	21/421 (5%)
December	20/94 (21%)	67/327 (20%)	87/421 (21%)
January	29/125 (55%)	23/320 (10%)	52/445 (12%)
February	27/49 (55%)	142/375 (38%)	169/424 (40%)
March 1–10	3/6 (50%)	165/182 (91%)	168/188 (89%)
Total	99*/427 (20%)	398/1472 (27%)	497/1899 (26%)
*The 99 Commando Club missions on NVN required ~500 sorties.

=== Missions ===
The LS-85 radar using day/night shift crews of 5 men each became operational on November 1, 1967; and trial missions of Commando Club by Republic F-105 Thunderchiefs were led by Col. John C. Giraudo (355th Fighter Wing commander). F-105 Commando Club missions included the November 15, 1967, 357th Tactical Fighter Squadron bombing of Yên Bái Air Base in Route Package 5 ("no BDA possible") and the defeated November 18 raid of 16 F-105s of the 388th Tactical Fighter Wing—preceded by 4 F-105 Wild Weasels—on Phúc Yên Air Base (JCS Target 6). The latter mission's loss of 2 Wild Weasels to MiGs and then some of the bombers to SAM sites that tracked the USAF jamming resulted in temporary suspension of Commando Club until electronic countermeasures were improved. Through November 16, LS-85 had effected a direct hit (zero miss distance) as well as a 5 mi (8.0 km) miss: the Commando Club CEP for "14 runs was 867 feet" while other Skyspot sites for 1967 missions averaged 300–350 ft (91–107 m) error at ranges ≤100 nmi (190 km; 120 mi). LS-85 accuracy was improved during the suspension period, another UHF radio was added at the summit, and the radio relay's secondary task of surveilling for MiGs was eliminated.

Commando Club was resumed by November 21 when F-105s attacked the Yên Bái airfield (also on December 1 & 23, January 5, & February 11.) LS-85 directing bombings of Laos' Ban Phougnong truck park on December 22, a target "25 miles west of Channel 97" on December 28, and "a target 20 miles east of San Neua" December 31; and "Commando Club under Wager Control" bombed the Kim Lo Army Barracks northwest of Hanoi on February 7, 1968, a Route Pack V target on February 11, and the "Phuc Yen (JCS 6) airfield" & "the Ban Nakay truck park in Northern Laos" on February 19. Arc Light B-52s and other aircraft also flew missions of Commando Club, which were 20% (less than 1 per day) of all bombing missions on North Vietnam targets during November 1 – March 10. Commando Club airstrikes against Laos targets included operations to interdict enemy advances on LS-85 such as the Battle of Route 602. "On 21 February the Ambassador authorized the Local Area Defense Commander (alternately the senior CIA officer or the FAC) to use the TSQ radar to direct any and all strikes within 12 kilometers of the summit" and "between the 20th and 29th, 342 sorties hit within 30 kilometers of Phou Phathi." Commando Club operations against Route 602 and advancing troops were part of the approximately 400 Commando Club missions out of the "1,472 BARREL ROLL Strike missions" flown "around" LS-85 from November 1 – March 10. When the enemy reached positions near the site, the order from Washington, D.C., was to "hold the site at all costs."

== Site defenses and attacks ==
The initial assessment by the site's 7th AF coordinator was that after radar operations began LS-85 would be attacked within 6 months, which a February 25 CIA report accurately predicted would be after March 10. Summit structures at LS-85 had originally been outfitted with demolition charges (later removed by the technicians), and the personnel eventually had small arms (e.g., M16 rifles) for defense. TACAN and AN/TSQ-81 personnel were included in the February plan to evacuate when the site's risk became too high, and defense training had been provided. An enemy patrol was dispersed from the base of the mountain on January 10, a January 12 airstrike bombed LS-85, and a mortar attack was on January 30. On February 18 near the head of the road an NVA survey party was defeated (the NVA map with planned artillery positions was captured.) On March 10 (1800–1945 hours), an "artillery barrage" preceded an attack toward the southeast slope by 3 battalions ("a kilometer or two from the hill"), and commandos including Hmong defectors—instead of assaulting in a direct infantry attack upslope toward the radar station—scaled the north mountain cliff and after midnight killed the majority of the onsite technicians. All areas of LS-85 were captured, and the remaining mountaintop structures were destroyed by US airstrikes through the next week. A Top Secret August 1968 US official history was declassified in 1988, and a 1996 North Vietnamese Report was translated in 1998. Post-war visits to the site resulted in identification of US radar crewmembers remains in 2005 and 2012.

== See also ==
- Muang Phalan TACAN Site
- North Vietnamese invasion of Laos
