= AN/MSQ-35 Bomb Scoring Central =

US military computerized tracking radar

Reeves AN/MSQ-35
- Country of origin: United States
- Manufacturer: Reeves Instrument Corporation
- Range: 200,000 yd (99 nmi; 180 km) beacon track
- Precision: 65 yd (59 m); Azimuth: 18 mils (1.0125 deg)

The Reeves AN/MSQ-35 Bomb Scoring Central was a United States Air Force dual radar system with computerized plotting board. It was used by the 1st Combat Evaluation Group to evaluate the accuracy of Strategic Air Command bomber crews.

In accordance with the Joint Electronics Type Designation System (JETDS), the "AN/MSQ-35" designation represents the 35th design of an Army-Navy electronic device for ground mobile special combination equipment. The JETDS system also now is used to name all Department of Defense electronic systems.

== Description ==
The central had a 20 rpm Acquisition Radar System with a variable "fan-shaped beam" in elevation and an Interrogator Set AN/TPX-27 for identification friend or foe. The central's trailer van for operations had the separate AN/MSQ-54 Bomb Scoring Set with an automatic tracking radar group (OA-450/FSA-4 Receiver-Transmitter Control Group), a computer group with analog vacuum tube circuitry and on the roof, the antenna group. A communications group provided a link for receiving the aircraft's signal at simulated bomb release, and additional vehicles included a V-280 maintenance van and a V-287 flatbed trailer for transporting the radar/IFF antennas.

== Operation ==
In addition to providing a conventional plot of the aircraft bomb run, the computer group automated the previously manual "bomb plot" in which technicians used time-of-flight charts for air drag and drew lengths of line from the release point to the vacuum impact point and then to an estimate impact point for drag and crosswind. By automatically using "ballistic data" such as time-of-fall to determine vacuum impact point, the AN/MSQ-35 computed bomb "score data [that was] printed out on tape" from a paper roll.

== Development and training ==
The X-band Western Electric M-33 Fire Control System "was utilized as a basic building block" for the X-band AN/MSQ-35, and "techniques established during [the] AN/USQ-9 development program were utilized in the AN/MSQ-35 production program." In 1962 the Reeves Instrument Corporation production facility hosted the first class for AN/MSQ-35 operators, and the central's field testing was in early 1963 at White Sands Missile Range.

== Deployment ==
The AN/MSQ-35 military school was initially at the Aberdeen Proving Ground (where the M-33 school had been located) and the central eventually became the instructional radar used at the 40-week Keesler Air Force Base technical training school for Automatic Tracking Radar Specialists (AUTOTRACK). The Final Engineering Report for the AN/MSQ-35 was published in December 1965 after it was used as the basis for developing the 1965 Reeves AN/MSQ-77 Bomb Directing Central with integrating computer for Combat Skyspot ground-directed bombing in the then-ongoing Vietnam War.

== See also ==
- List of military electronics of the United States
- Joint Electronics Type Designation System – Unclassified designation system for United States military electronic equipment
