= Battle of Lima Site 85 =

1968 Vietnam War and Laotian Civil War battle

- Part of the Laotian Civil War and the Vietnam War
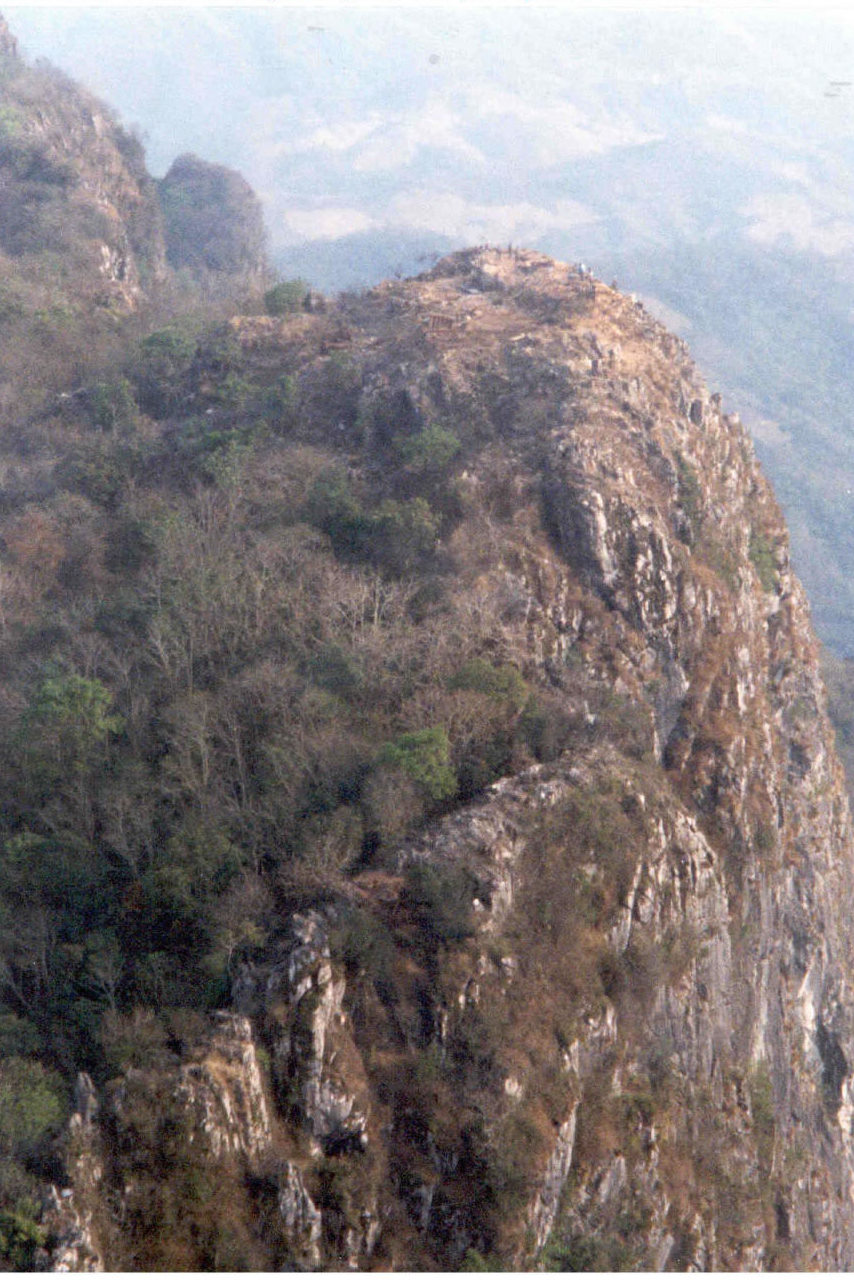
- The U.S. facility atop of Phou Pha Thi, known as Lima Site 85, was the site of a major battle on 10 March 1968.
Date	10–11 March 1968
Location	Houaphanh Province, Laos 20°26′46″N 103°42′51″E
Result	North Vietnamese and Pathet Lao victory

Belligerents
United States; Laos; Thailand	North Vietnam; Pathet Lao

Commanders and leaders
(United States) Clarence F. Blanton †; (United States) Richard Secord; (Kingdom of Laos) Vang Pao	Truong Muc

Strength
United States: 19; Kingdom of Laos: 1,000; Thailand: 300	3,000

Casualties and losses
Total casualties: 13 U.S. killed; 42 Thai and Hmong killed + few dozens Hmong wounded (North Vietnamese claim)	Total casualties: 1 killed (North Vietnamese claim); 2 wounded

The Battle of Lima Site 85, also called Battle of Phou Pha Thi, was fought as part of a military campaign waged during the Vietnam War and Laotian Civil War by the North Vietnamese People's Army of Vietnam (PAVN) and the Pathet Lao, against airmen of the United States Air Force (USAF)'s 1st Combat Evaluation Group, elements of the Royal Lao Army, Royal Thai Border Patrol Police, and the CIA-led Hmong Clandestine Army. The battle was fought on Phou Pha Thi mountain in Houaphanh Province, Laos, on 10 March 1968, and derives its name from the mountaintop where it was fought or from the designation of a 700-foot (210 m) landing strip in the valley below, and was the largest single ground combat loss of USAF members during the Vietnam War.

During the Vietnam War and the Laotian Civil War, Phou Pha Thi mountain was an important strategic outpost which had served both sides at various stages of the conflict. In 1966, the United States Ambassador to Laos William H. Sullivan approved a plan by the USAF to construct a TACAN site atop Phou Pha Thi; at the time they lacked a navigation site with sufficient range to guide U.S. bomber aircraft to their targets in North Vietnam. In 1967 the site was upgraded with the air-transportable all-weather AN/TSQ-81 radar bombing control system. This enabled American aircraft to bomb North Vietnam and Laos at night and in all types of weather, an operation code-named Commando Club. Despite efforts to maintain the secrecy of the installation, which included "sheep-dipping" of the airmen involved, the facility did not escape the attention of the PAVN and Pathet Lao forces.

Toward the end of 1967, PAVN units increased the tempo of their operations around Phou Pha Thi, and by 1968 several attacks were launched against Lima Site 85. In the final assault on 10 March 1968, elements of the PAVN 41st Special Forces Battalion attacked the facility, with support from the PAVN 766th Regiment and one Pathet Lao battalion. The Hmong and Thai forces defending the facility were overwhelmed by the combined PAVN and Pathet Lao forces.

== Background ==
Phou Pha Thi is a remote mountain in Houaphanh Province, northeastern Laos. The mountain, which is about 1,700 meters (5,600 ft) high, is located within the former Royal Lao Army's Military Region 2, and about 24 kilometers (15 mi) from the border of the Democratic Republic of Vietnam and 48 kilometers (30 mi) away from Sam Neua, the Pathet Lao capital. For the local Hmong and Yao tribes that lived in the area, Phou Pha Thi was a place of religious significance. They believed it was inhabited by spirits possessing supernatural powers to exercise control over their lives. The United States Air Force (USAF) saw Phou Pha Thi as an ideal location for installing a radar navigation system to assist pilots in their bombing campaigns in North Vietnam, and along the Ho Chi Minh Trail inside Laos.

Laos was a neutral country according to the International Agreement on the Neutrality of Laos signed on 23 July 1962. Therefore, the United States was prohibited from openly conducting military operations in the kingdom. Activities undertaken by the USAF in Laos had to be approved by the ambassador to Laos, William H. Sullivan. When the plan to install a navigation system on Phou Pha Thi Mountain was proposed, Sullivan initially opposed it as he thought that Laotian Prime Minister Prince Souvanna Phouma would not allow his country to be involved in an aerial offensive against North Vietnam. Souvanna Phouma did permit the installation, on the condition that it not be used or occupied by U.S. military personnel.

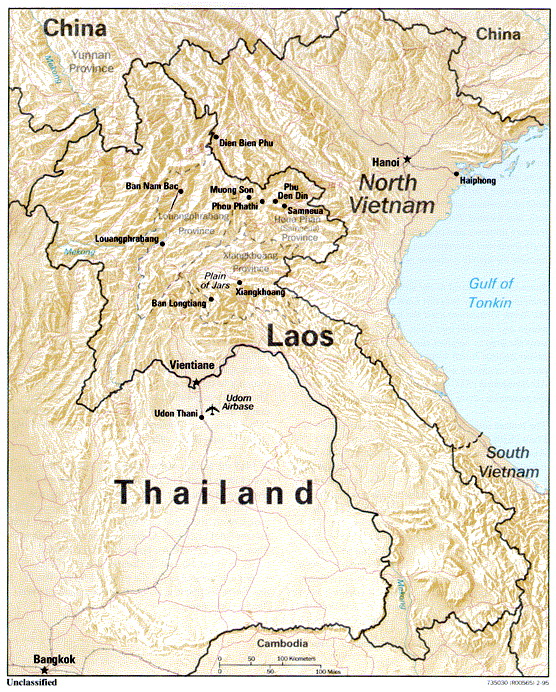
Phou Pha Thi, in northeastern Laos, the site of a U.S. TACAN facility known as Lima Site 85.

In August 1966, the USAF installed a TACAN System, an autonomous radio transmitter that provided pilots and navigators with distance and bearing relative to the station on Phou Pha Thi. In 1967, under the code name Heavy Green, the facility was upgraded with the TSQ-81, which could direct and control attacking jet fighters and bombers to their targets and provide them with precise bomb release points. It began operating in late November 1967 as Operation Commando Club. To operate the equipment within the limitations imposed by the Laotian Prime Minister, USAF personnel assigned to work at the installation had to sign paperwork that temporarily released them from military service, and to work in the guise of civilian technicians from Lockheed—a process euphemistically called "sheep-dipping". In reality, they operated as members of the USAF Circuit Rider teams from the 1st Mobile Communications Group based at Udorn Royal Thai Air Force Base who rotated to the site every seven days.

Personnel working at the TACAN site were supplied by weekly flights of the 20th Special Operations Squadron, based at Udorn RTAFB in northeastern Thailand operating under the code name Operation Pony Express, using Lima Site 85, the 700-meter (2,300 ft) airstrip constructed by the Central Intelligence Agency in the valley below. Hmong General Vang Pao, who spearheaded the allied war effort against North Vietnamese and Pathet Lao forces in Military Region 2, was entrusted with the task of guarding the facility using the Hmong Clandestine Army alongside CIA-funded Thai Border Patrol Police forces. Though substantial resources were invested to maintain the facility, the USAF command doubted Vang Pao's ability to defend the installation. Accordingly, all equipment had explosives attached so that if the site was overrun, it could be quickly destroyed. By late 1967, Lima Site 85's radar directed 55% of all bombing operations against North Vietnam.

== Prelude ==
As USAF ground controllers were able to guide attacking aircraft against North Vietnamese targets in all types of weather, installation of the TSQ-81 radar system on Phou Pha Thi was considered to have been extremely successful during the final months of 1967. Yet a formerly top-secret after-action report credited Commando Club with guiding the following sorties:

Against North Vietnam	Nov	Dec	Jan	Feb	Mar 1–10	Summary
Total Missions	153	94	125	49	6	427
Missions Under Commando Club (TSQ-81)	20	20	29	27	3	99
Percentage Under Commando Club	13.0	21.3	23.2	55.1	50.0	23.2

At the same time, Commando Club was directing missions westward into Operation Barrel Roll's B Sector, as the North's forces bypassed LS 85 in their push deeper into Laos to attack Nam Bac.

Barrel Roll area	Nov	Dec	Jan	Feb	Mar 1–10	Summary
Total Missions	268	327	320	375	182	1,472
Missions Under Commando Club (TSQ-81)	1	67	23	142	165	408
Percentage Under Commando Club	–	20.4	10.3	37.8	90.6	27.7

The trend of LS 85 being forced to use its capabilities toward defending itself instead of assisting offensive missions into North Vietnam is evident from the tables above. Successes of the system also brought about worries for the personnel on the ground. Major Richard Secord, who was responsible for the security of Lima Site 85, was concerned about the safety of the unarmed USAF technicians working there dressed as civilians. He requested Green Berets be assigned as on-site security. Ambassador Sullivan turned down the request. Sullivan repeatedly insisted the "civilian personnel" at Lima Site 85 should not be armed, but Secord decided to equip the technicians with weapons. M16 rifles, fragmentation grenades, concussion grenades, and other small arms were then brought in. Secord said that, given the site's meager defenses, he felt the site could not be held against a serious assault.

Secord's fears were justified, as USAF reconnaissance aircraft regularly flying over northeastern Laos in 1967 revealed that the paved roads constructed by the North Vietnamese were obviously approaching Phou Pha Thi. Road construction activities were observed along Routes 6 and 19, which connected Dien Bien Phu in North Vietnam with Phou Pha Thi and Nam Bac in Laos.

Realizing the PAVN would try to destroy the installation, Secord advised the US Embassy in Vientiane to evacuate all US personnel. However, high-ranking US officials insisted that Lima Site 85 should operate as long as possible, as it helped save the lives of US pilots every day it remained operational. In December 1967, a communist military offensive in the region was signalled by a series of skirmishes. On 15 December, CIA-led Hmong reconnaissance patrols detected both PAVN and Pathet Lao battalions moving against Nam Bac, at the time the stronghold of the Royal Lao Army.

On 16 December, two Pathet Lao companies overran Phou Den Din, only 12 kilometers (7.5 mi) east of Lima Site 85. Shortly afterwards, Hmong units recaptured the village. Toward the end of 1967, US controllers at Lima Site 85 directed F-4, F-105 and A-1 fighter-bombers based in Thailand and South Vietnam in air strikes against North Vietnamese and Pathet Lao formations that were massing around the US facility at Phou Pha Thi. A-26 Invaders were called in for night missions, targeting movements of the enemy ground troops on Route 6 and Route 19. On 14 January 1968, the situation in northeastern Laos continued to worsen, as an estimated four PAVN infantry battalions captured the Laotian government's stronghold at Nam Bac. Despite the growing threat from North Vietnamese forces, the US military was still not permitted to reinforce the installation on Phou Pha Thi Mountain due to political sensitivities.

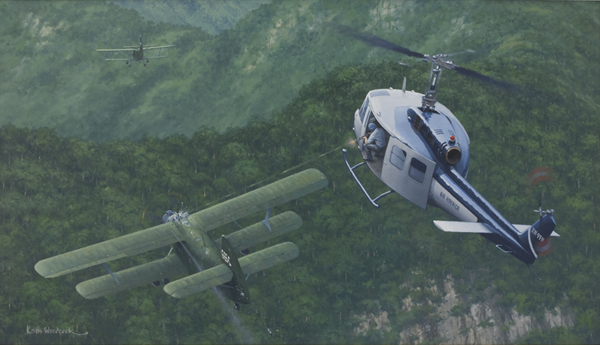
An Air Combat First – CIA painting of Air America Bell UH-1D Iroquois helicopter engaging 2 VPAF An-2 biplanes

The defense of Lima Site 85 was assigned to two CIA paramilitary officers who led about 1,000 Hmong soldiers, with 200 men guarding the ridge line and the remaining 800 in the valley below. They were reinforced by a Thai Border Patrol Police battalion of 300 men. In the first week of 1968, the combined PAVN and Pathet Lao forces probed Royal Laos Army positions in the area by launching several artillery attacks. On 10 January, a Pathet Lao patrol was driven from the area by the Hmong soldiers. Fearing the explosives attached to their equipment could be detonated by incoming artillery rounds, US technicians dismantled the charges and threw them over the cliff.

On 12 January, CIA spotters reported a four-aircraft formation flying in the direction of Lima Site 85. They were Soviet-made Antonov An-2 biplanes. Two aircraft continued towards Lima Site 85, while the others turned away. The Vietnam People's Air Force, in one of its few air attacks during the conflict, tried to destroy the radar at Lima Site 85. The An-2s flew over Phou Pha Thi, and their crewmen dropped 120 mm mortar shells through the aircraft's floor and then strafed their targets with 57 mm rockets mounted on the wing pods. As they repeatedly attacked the facility, ground fire heavily damaged one AN-2, and it crashed into a mountainside. By now, CIA officers and US controllers at Lima Site 85 had managed to contact an Air America helicopter, which was faster than the Soviet-made biplanes. The Huey pilot Captain Ted Moore sighted the remaining An-2, and promptly gave chase. As he pulled alongside, flight mechanic Glenn Woods armed with an AK-47 assault rifle opened fire and caused the biplane to crash into a ridge.

The remaining An-2s had observed the attack from a distance and managed to escape without damage. Four Hmongs, two men and two women, had been killed by the North's attack. The TSQ-81 radar and associated equipment were undamaged. Shortly afterwards, what remained of one of the An-2 biplanes was put on display in front of the That Luang Monument, Vientiane's most important Buddhist shrine, as proof of North Vietnamese military activities in the kingdom. Despite the attack, the US Embassy in Vientiane and the USAF refused to alter their strategy for defending Lima Site 85. Lieutenant Colonel Clarence F. Blanton, commander of USAF personnel at the facility, was given no authority to supervise his own perimeter or to order a retreat if they again came under attack. Throughout January and February, intelligence collected by the Hmongs confirmed that a major assault on Lima Site 85 was being prepared, but Sullivan and the US military took no steps to strengthen the defenses. In late February, a Combat Controller, Technical Sergeant James Gary, arrived to augment the defenses by directing air strikes. He was replaced in this duty by Sergeant Roger D. Huffman on about 4 March.

== Battle ==
=== North Vietnamese plan and preparations ===
On 18 February 1968, a PAVN artillery survey team was ambushed near Lima Site 85 by Hmong reconnaissance teams, killing a PAVN officer in the process. The dead officer, who was a major, carried a notebook which revealed a plan to attack Phou Pha Thi by using three PAVN battalions and one Pathet Lao battalion. Consequently, US personnel at Lima Site 85 directed 342 air strikes within 30 meters (98 ft) of their own facility to disrupt their opponent's build-up during 20–29 February. Unknown to the USAF, the PAVN had also drawn up their plan to capture Lima Site 85 by deploying a Special Forces unit. The task of capturing the US facility was entrusted to a platoon from the PAVN 41st Special Forces Battalion, led by First Lieutenant Truong Muc. The platoon numbered 33 soldiers, and they were reinforced by a nine-man sapper squad and a communications and cryptography squad.

Prior to the mission, Muc's soldiers had undergone nine months of special training, mainly focused on mountain fighting techniques and jungle operations. They also conducted physical conditioning, to improve their physical fitness and stamina to undertake operations in the most extreme conditions in Laotian territory. On 18 December 1967, following their intensive training, soldiers of the PAVN 41st Special Forces Battalion launched the first phase of their operation by conducting terrain reconnaissance and watching activities on Lima Site 85 to learn their opponent's routines. As part of the second phase, commenced on 22 January 1968, six PAVN sappers were sent out to climb Phou Pha Thi, to pinpoint opposing positions in and around Lima Site 85, as well as routes of withdrawal. On 28 February 1968, the PAVN Special Forces completed their preparations, and they began marching towards their assembly point on 1 March.

To maintain secrecy and surprise, Muc was ordered to avoid contact with local civilians and opposing military forces. In the event they were engaged by opposing forces, the PAVN would deploy a small force to deal with the situation while the main formation would continue moving to their objective on Phou Pha Thi. Once the PAVN formation had arrived at their assembly area, they were to be divided into two assault groups. The first assault group, under Muc's direct command, was divided into five "cells" to attack key targets at Lima Site 85. Cells 1 and 2 were given the mission of capturing the communications center, with the latter given the secondary role of supporting Cell 3, which was given the main mission of seizing the TACAN site and eliminating all US personnel. Cell 4 was to capture the airstrip, and Cell 5 was placed in reserve. Second Lieutenant Nguyen Viet Hung was given responsibility to lead the second assault group with the mission of neutralizing the Thai positions. The attack would commence during the early hours of 9 or 10 March.

To capture Lima Site 85, the PAVN Special Forces were equipped with three Chinese-made K-54 pistols, 23 AK-47 assault rifles, four 7.62mm carbines and three RPG-7 rocket propelled grenade launchers. They carried 200 rounds of ammunition for each AK-47, six rounds for each RPG, 400 grams (14 oz) of explosives, and six hand grenades. The weapons load, in addition to 15 days of rations and other personal items, required each soldier to pack between 42 kilograms (93 lb) to 45 kilograms (99 lb). Shortly after the PAVN Special Forces arrived at the assembly point, they moved off to an undisclosed location for two days to test-fire all their weapons, and to ensure their explosives were in working order. Then, in an attempt to fool Hmong and US intelligence, the North Vietnamese made diversionary movements against Muong Son to cover their main assault. On 9 March, elements of the PAVN 41st Special Forces Battalion arrived in the vicinity of Phou Pha Thi, where they made final preparations for their assault.

=== Fall of Lima Site 85 ===
By 9 March 1968, the US facility atop Phou Pha Thi was surrounded by PAVN and Pathet Lao units. The PAVN 766th Regiment and one Pathet Lao battalion totalled more than 3,000 men. Despite the gravity of the situation, Sullivan did not issue an order for the evacuation of US personnel from Phou Pha Thi. At around 18:00 on 10 March, Lima Site 85 was subjected to a series of artillery barrages. Under the cover of the artillery bombardment, the PAVN Special Forces sent a small team up the mountain to defuse mines and quick-fuse grenades, and to establish their routes of infiltration. Inside the facility, US technicians grabbed their weapons and ran into trenches and bunkers, abandoning the equipment which could enable them to call for air support. At 19:45 the barrage stopped, and the US technicians returned to their positions.

The TSQ-81 antenna received minor damage during the attack, and the US suffered no casualties. The only 105 mm howitzer, which was operated by the Hmongs, received a direct hit, and was rendered ineffective. At around 20:20, Sullivan gave the US commander at Lima Site 85 the authority to direct air strikes against targets on the lower slopes of the mountain, on the basis that the situation had become critical. About 20 minutes later, the 33-man PAVN platoon began climbing towards the US facility at Lima Site 85. At 21:15 Sullivan considered evacuating all US personnel from the facility at first light. However, officers of the Seventh Air Force contacted the US Embassy in Laos and indicated that evacuation should only occur as the last resort, when the situation on top of Phou Pha Thi was no longer under their control.

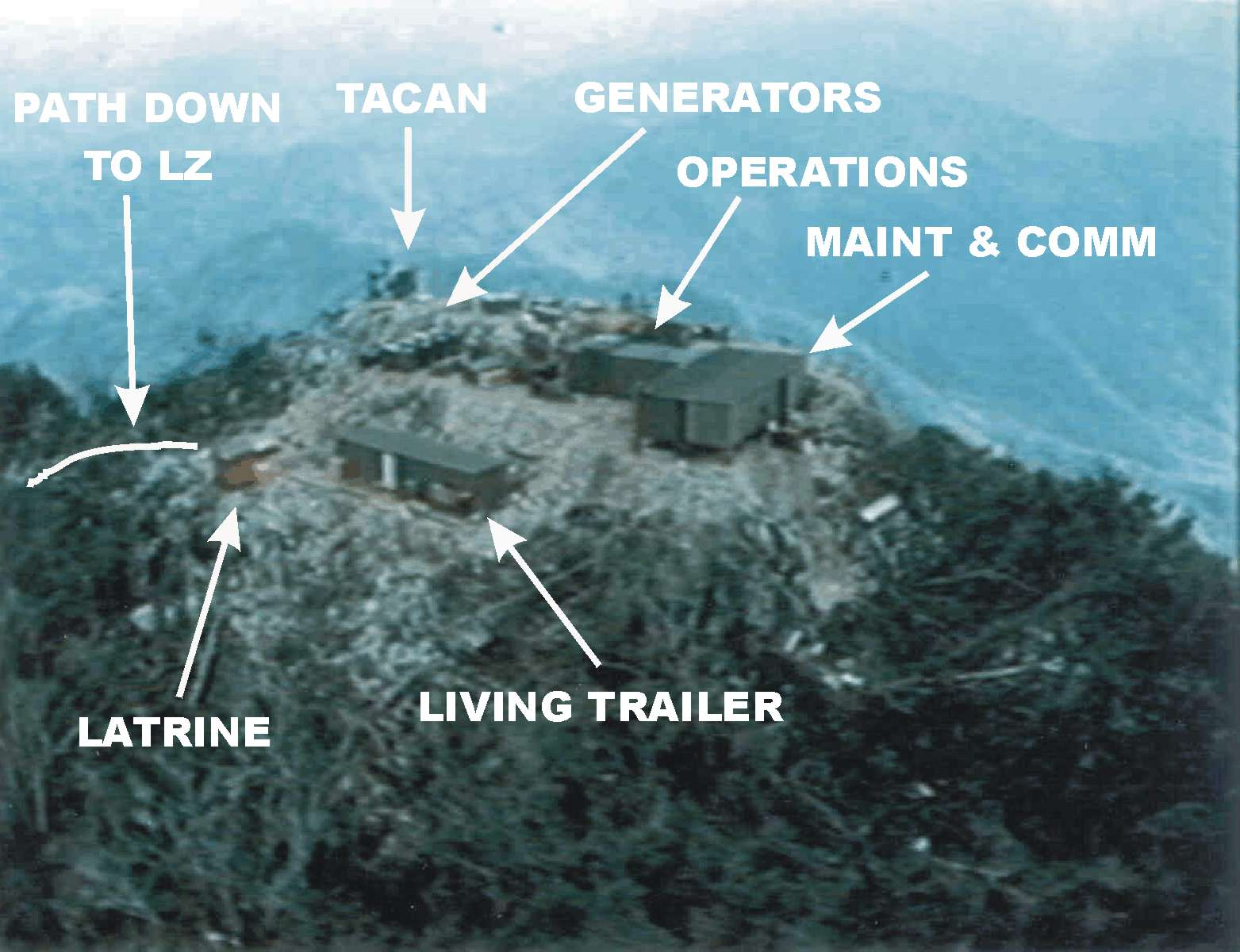
The configuration of LS-85 mountaintop area included radar shelters ("Operations") with antennas and interior equipment normally in/on mobile AN/MSQ-77 "control and plotting" and radar vans. "TACAN" is the box shelter for the AN/TRN-17 electronics with antenna on top, and "LZ" is for the nearby helicopter Landing Zone. Also not shown are the CIA airstrip and command post.

At 21:21 the PAVN resumed their artillery attack on Phou Pha Thi, followed by several infantry assaults by the PAVN 766th Regiment, which prompted Sullivan to order the evacuation of six technicians by 08:15 the next morning, from a contingent of 19 US personnel. Starting at 01:00 on 11 March, the PAVN moved into their assigned positions to launch their attack. About 02:00, a US adviser at the airstrip reported to Secord and CIA officers at Udorn that he heard gunfire on top of Phou Pha Thi, and communication with US technicians at Lima Site 85 was cut off. Afterwards, Secord briefed US A-1 Skyraider pilots in Thailand on the situation at Lima Site 85, to familiarize them with friendly positions around the facility, so they could cover the evacuation of US personnel and support the Hmong counterattack.

About 03:00 Cell 1 moved to within 150 meters (490 ft) of their objective, with Cell 5 positioned behind them. At the same time, the commander of Cell 4 decided to maneuver his unit to the west side of the airstrip instead of the east side as originally planned, because the terrain on the east side was higher and was covered by buildings. Precisely at 03:45, Cell 1 moved to within 30 meters (98 ft) of the communications center, when they bumped into a Hmong outpost. Both sides exchanged fire, and the outpost was destroyed by a grenade while the Hmong soldier guarding the post retreated. Shortly after, a soldier from Cell 1 fired an RPG-7 grenade which destroyed the TACAN antenna. Within 15 minutes, Cells 1 and 2 had secured the communications site. Signaled by the explosion of Cell 1's RPG-7 round, Cell 3 immediately attacked the TACAN installation by firing one of their own RPG-7s, which destroyed the electric generators.

Upon hearing the noise of explosions, the on-duty US technicians rushed out the front door of their operations building where they were met by PAVN gunfire. Blanton, the US commander at Lima Site 85, was killed alongside two other US technicians. Those who were not killed retreated to the west side of the mountain, where they hid on the edge of the cliff. From their hideout, the US technicians fired on the North Vietnamese with their M16s and hand grenades. At 04:15, in response to the gunfire from the US technicians, Muc ordered Cell 5 to reinforce Cell 3, and they captured the TACAN installation at 04:30 after 45 minutes of fighting. Meanwhile, Cell 4 had great difficulties in their attempt to seize the airstrip, where they were blocked by a Hmong mortar position. Le Ba Chom, the commander of Cell 4, was isolated from the other three soldiers of his cell. To avoid being captured alive by the numerically superior Hmong forces, Chom and his soldiers held onto their position and fought till daybreak.

Raven Forward Air Controllers at Lima Site 20A, being the nearest available American support, were awakened by a radio call about 04:00. They flew in the dark to Lima Strip 36 at Na Khang to position themselves at the airstrip closest to Lima Site 85. The Ravens took up station over Lima Site 85 at dawn. At 05:15 Sullivan, from the US Embassy in Vientiane, decided to evacuate Lima Site 85. He gave a signal to US pilots at Udorn to begin the operation, which was due to start at 07:15. Sullivan did not realize that US technicians were no longer in control of their TSQ-81 equipment. Starting around 06:00, Pao's Hmong soldiers launched a counterattack against PAVN positions at the communication center, which was guarded by Cells 1 and 2, but their attacks were repelled and the PAVN held their positions. With the final Hmong counterattack on the communication site defeated at 06:25, Cell 2 was ordered to support Cells 3 and 5 in their fight at the main TACAN installation. By 06:35, the PAVN fully controlled the TACAN site. At the airstrip, Cell 4 was encircled by an estimated two Hmong platoons, but Chom and his unit were able to fight their way out by taking full advantage of rough terrain which favored them. Later, Cell 4 linked up with other units at the TACAN site.

At first light Air America helicopters hovered over Lima Site 85 to start the evacuation, which was covered by USAF A-1 Skyraiders. Immediately, Hmong soldiers and their CIA commanders rushed the TACAN site and shouted to the US technicians that help was coming. In response, the PAVN Special Forces organized a defense around the TACAN site, and hid their dead and wounded comrades under the large rocks which dotted Phou Pha Thi. While US fighter-bombers strafed the TACAN site, the Air America helicopter landed on the airstrip and they picked up two CIA officers, one forward air-controller, and five technicians who hid during the firefight. Later in the day, Air America was able to recover or account for eight of the dead US personnel on Lima Site 85, along with a number of wounded Hmong soldiers. By midday, Lima Site 85 was fully controlled by the PAVN 41st Special Forces Battalion, and they held the facility until 14 March when they withdrew from the area.

== Aftermath ==
Just before midday on 11 March, the USAF turned their attention from looking for their missing personnel to that of destroying the captured radar, along with all the documentation and operation information left behind at Lima Site 85. Between 12–18 March, the USAF conducted a total of 95 strike sorties against the radar site, and on 19 March an A-1 fighter-bomber destroyed every building at the facility. In addition to the destruction of their radar equipment, the USAF bombing of Lima Site 85 may also have had the effect of obliterating the bodies of US personnel left behind at the site (two sets of remains were found in 2013). In the days following the loss of Phou Pha Thi, Sullivan reflected on the disaster at Lima Site 85 and commented that US technicians operating there should have been evacuated on 10 March, when it became amply clear the PAVN were preparing to launch an assault.

For the USAF, the loss at Phou Pha Thi was not a result of intelligence failure, because it had been provided with accurate information from the very start. Instead, it was clearly a failure of command and control, as the US personnel and their Hmong allies were not permitted to freely organize their own defense to hold the radar facility. The Battle of Lima Site 85 resulted in the largest single ground combat loss of USAF personnel during the Vietnam War. A total of 12 US personnel went missing or were killed in the fighting on Phou Pha Thi; 11 were killed or missing on the ground and one was shot dead during the evacuation. A USAF A-1 searching for survivors was shot down and the pilot killed.

The total casualty figures for PAVN, Pathet Lao, Hmong, and Thai units are unknown. According to official Vietnamese history, the PAVN 41st Special Forces Battalion suffered one soldier killed and two wounded in their fight for Lima Site 85. Against those losses, the Vietnamese claimed a total of 42 Hmong and Thai soldiers were killed, and a number of others were wounded. A large number of weapons were captured by the PAVN, including one 105 mm howitzer, one 85 mm artillery piece, four recoilless rifles, four heavy mortars, nine heavy machine guns, and vast amounts of ammunition. The PAVN victory proved to be a significant one, as they had succeeded in knocking out a major asset of the USAF, which had inflicted heavy damage to North Vietnam's limited industrial infrastructure.

The fight at Phou Pha Thi, which was part of a larger military campaign waged by the North Vietnamese and their Pathet Lao allies, marked the beginning of the Communist dry-season offensive against Laotian Government forces in northeastern Laos. By September 1968, the strength of PAVN and Pathet Lao forces in the Sam Neua area were estimated to have numbered more than 20 battalions. Against such heavy odds, General Vang Pao insisted on recapturing Phou Pha Thi, which the US Embassy believed unnecessary. On 1 November 1968, Pao launched Operation Pigfat in attempt to retake Phou Pha Thi, but the operation quickly turned into a rout of the Royal Lao Army and the Hmong guerrillas and Phou Pha Thi was never retaken.

Although airpower was to be a major factor in the defense of Lima Site 85, it could not be applied without limitations and restrictions. The defense of Lima Site 85 was not the sole focus of limited air resources at the time. During this period, the 1968 Tet Offensive was underway in South Vietnam, the Marine outpost at Khe Sanh Combat Base was under siege, and there existed an unprecedented flow of enemy logistical traffic which had to be interdicted. Lima Site 85 had provided direction to about a quarter of the USAF missions over North Vietnam and Barrel Roll from November 1967 to 11 March 1968. No other facility existed to provide a similar coverage over these areas. While this loss was a serious blow to the USAF effort, it was not crippling.

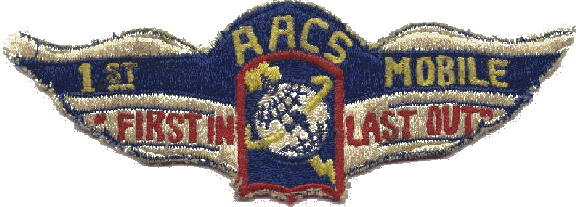
The patch of the 1st AACS Mobile Communications Group present at Lima Site 85.

Eleven of the twelve USAF personnel lost on the day of the battle were listed first as missing in action (MIA), then later as KIA/body not recovered. Between 1994 and 2004, 11 investigations were conducted by both Joint POW/MIA Accounting Command (JPAC) and unilaterally by Lao and Vietnamese investigators on both sides of the border. In 2002 two of the former PAVN soldiers who had taken part in the attack told investigators that they threw the bodies of the Americans off the mountain after the attack as they were unable to bury them on the rocky surface.

In March 2003, JPAC investigators threw dummies over the edge at those points indicated by the PAVN soldiers while a photographer in a helicopter videotaped their fall. That pointed the investigators to a ledge, 540 feet (160 m) below. Several mountaineer-qualified JPAC specialists scaled down the cliffs to the ledge where they recovered leather boots in four different sizes, five survival vests, and other fragments of material that indicated the presence of at least four Americans. The remains of three of the missing 11 servicemen were recovered and identified.

On 14 February 2007 the remains of Colonel Donald Westbrook, of the 602d Special Operations Squadron, who had been shot down by small arms fire in his Douglas A-1E Skyraider aircraft (s/n 52-133888) on 13 March 1968, while searching for possible survivors of the battle, were positively identified from remains which had been returned on 3 September 1998.

On 7 December 2005 the Defense Prisoner of War/Missing Personnel Office (DPMAO) announced that the remains of Technical Sergeant Patrick L. Shannon had been identified and were being returned to his family.

In September 2012 the remains of Colonel Clarence Blanton were identified.

On 21 June 2024 the remains of Sgt. David S. Price were identified.

On 23 June 2025 Staff Sergeant Henry G. Gish and Technical Sergeant Willis R. Hall were accounted for.

On 23 June 2025 Tech. Sgt. Donald Kennebunk Springsteadah was accounted for.

On 8 August 2025 Master/Sergeant James H. Calfee was accounted for.

On 22 June 2026 S/Sgt. Don Franklin Worley was accounted for.

As of 26 June 2026 three of the airmen killed are still MIA/BNR:

- S/Sgt. James Woodrow Davis
- T/Sgt. Melvin Arnold Holland
- S/Sgt. Herbert Arthur Kirk

On 21 September 2010, Chief Master Sergeant Richard Etchberger's Air Force Cross (awarded posthumously in 1968) was upgraded to the Medal of Honor by President Barack Obama at a White House ceremony for his actions during the Battle of Lima Site 85.

A memorial to the USAF airmen killed and missing at Lima Site 85 and other Combat SkySpot airmen is co-located on Andersen Air Force Base, Guam, with the memorial to Operation Arc Light airmen. Another Combat SkySpot memorial is located at the Gunter AFB Enlisted Heritage Memorial Park.

== See also ==
- Ho Chi Minh Trail
- Lao Veterans of America Institute
- Lao Veterans of America
- Laos Memorial
- Lima Site 85
- Muang Phalan TACAN Site
- North Vietnamese invasion of Laos
- People's Army of Vietnam

== General and cited references ==
- Castle, Timothy N. (2000). One Day Too Long: Top Secret Site 85 and the Bombing of North Vietnam. New York; Chichester, Sussex, UK: Columbia University Press. ISBN 978-0231103176.
- Chauhan, Sharad (2004). Inside CIA: Lessons in Intelligence. New Delhi: APH Publishing Corporation. ISBN 8176486604.
- Do, Ben C. (1996). Several Battles in Military Region 2 During the War of Liberation, 1945–1975. Hanoi: People's Army Publishing House.
- Goldstein, Martin E. (1973). American Policy Toward Laos. Rutherford, N.J.: Fairleigh Dickinson University Press. ISBN 0838611311. OCLC 481197.
- Hamilton-Merritt, Jane (1999). Tragic Mountains: The Hmongs, the Americans, and the Secret War for Laos, 1942–1992. Bloomington, Ind.: Indiana University Press. ISBN 0253207568.
- Marrett, George J. (2003). Cheating death: Combat Air Rescues in Vietnam and Laos. New York: Harper Paperbacks. ISBN 978-0060891572.
- Robbins, Christopher (1987). The Ravens: The Men Who Flew in America's Secret War in Laos. New York: Simon & Schuster. ISBN 0671673165.
- Thompson, Wayne (2005). To Hanoi and Back: The United States Air Force and North Vietnam, 1966–1973. Honolulu: University Press of the Pacific. ISBN 978-1588342836.
- Warner, Roger (1995). Back Fire: The CIA's Secret War in Laos and Its Link to the War in Vietnam. New York: Simon & Schuster. ISBN 978-0684802923.
