= Operation Barrel Roll =

1964–73 covert US military operation in Laos during the Vietnam War

- Part of the Vietnam War
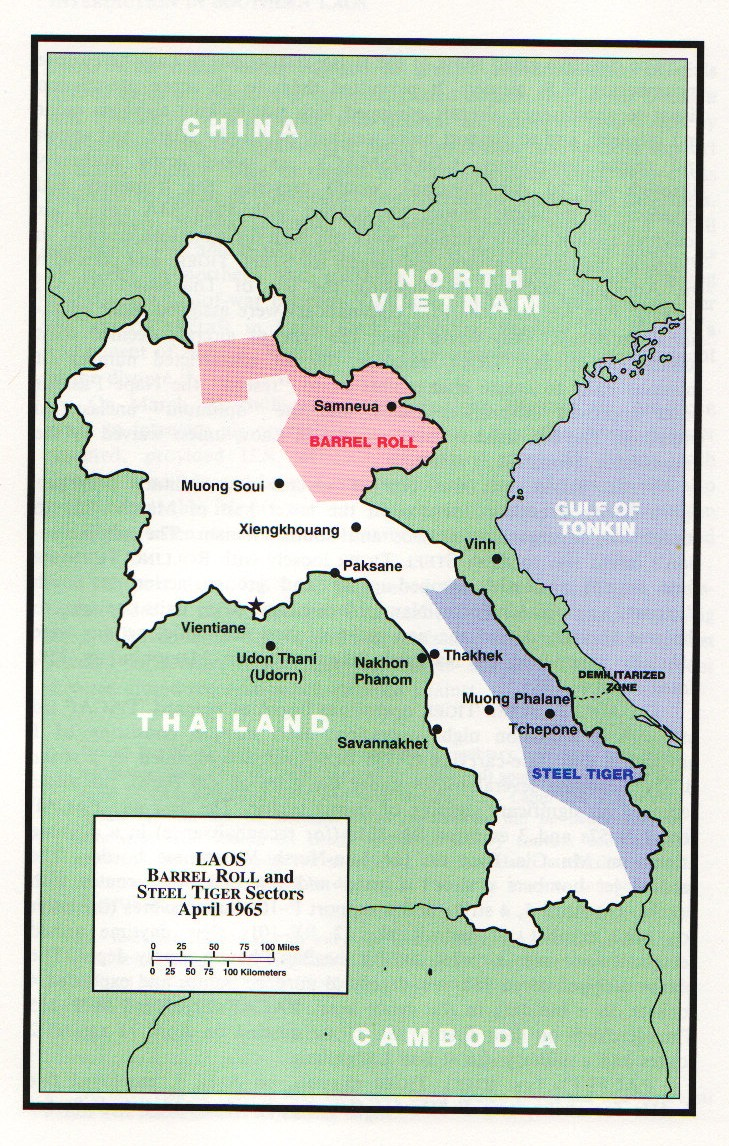
- Barrell Roll/Steel Tiger Areas of Operations
Date	14 December 1964 – 29 March 1973
Location	Northeastern Laos
Result	Strategic US failure: US failure to interdict the Ho Chi Minh Trail

Belligerents
United States; South Vietnam; Thailand; Laos	North Vietnam; Pathet Lao

Commanders and leaders
(United States) Lyndon B. Johnson (Laos) Souvanna Phouma (Laos) Vang Pao	(North Vietnam) Đồng Sĩ Nguyên

Casualties and losses
U.S.: 131 aircraft	Unknown

Operation Barrel Roll was a covert interdiction and close air support campaign conducted in the Kingdom of Laos by the U.S. Air Force 2nd Air Division and U.S. Navy Task Force 77 between 5 March 1964 and 29 March 1973, concurrent with the Vietnam War.

The operation was launched to persuade North Vietnam to stop supporting the insurgency in South Vietnam. It became an interdiction campaign against the Ho Chi Minh trail, North Vietnam's main logistical corridor, which ran from southwestern North Vietnam, through southeastern Laos, and into South Vietnam. The operation also increasingly provided close air support for Royal Lao Armed Forces, CIA-backed tribal allies, and Thai Volunteer Defense Corps in a covert ground war in northern and northeastern Laos. Barrel Roll and the "Secret Army" attempted to stem an increasing tide of People's Army of Vietnam (PAVN) and Pathet Lao offensives.

Barrel Roll was one of the most closely held secrets of the American military commitment in Southeast Asia. Due to the ostensible neutrality of Laos, guaranteed by the Geneva Conference of 1954 and the Declaration on the Neutrality of Laos of 1962, both the U.S. and North Vietnam strove to maintain the secrecy of their operations and only slowly escalated military actions there. In 1975, Laos emerged from nine years of war as devastated as any of the other Asian participants in the Vietnam War.

== Preliminaries (1962–1964) ==
=== Background ===
After a series of political and military machinations conducted by the U.S., the Pathet Lao, and the North Vietnamese in Laos that are described in the History of Laos since 1945, the Declaration on the Neutrality of Laos was signed in Geneva, Switzerland on 23 July 1962. The agreement, an attempt to end a civil war between the Communist-dominated (and North Vietnamese-directed) Pathet Lao, neutralists, and American-backed rightists, included provisions that required the removal of all foreign military forces and precluded the use of Lao territory for interfering in the internal affairs of another country – a blatant effort to shut down North Vietnam's growing logistical corridor through southeastern Laos that would become known as the Ho Chi Minh Trail.

A coalition Government of National Union was installed in the capital of Vientiane, but it soon ran into difficulties. By the 2 October 1962 deadline for the removal of foreign troops, the North Vietnamese had pulled out only 40 personnel, leaving approximately 6,000 troops in the eastern half of the country. Meanwhile, rightist elements (in control of the army) opposed the new government. The U.S. played its part by increasing its assistance to the right by covertly supplying the army through Thailand. Despite another international accord, Laos remained ensnared by the political and territorial ambitions of communist neighbors, the security concerns of Thailand and the United States, and geographic fate.

Fighting soon erupted between elements of the Pathet Lao and the Royal Lao Army. Although tentative negotiations resumed between the factions, matters took a turn for the worse when neutralist Prime Minister Prince Souvanna Phouma was arrested during a right-wing coup attempt. U.S. Ambassador Leonard S. Unger then notified the generals that the U.S. government would continue to support Souvanna. This turn of events had a profound effect on Laotian politics: First, it affirmed American support for Souvanna, only a few years after the U.S. had denounced him as a tool of the leftists; It also caused the neutralists to shift political allies from the left to the right; Finally, in May 1964, Souvanna announced the political union of the rightists and neutralists against the left.

Heavy fighting broke out on the Plain of Jars as the members of each political grouping chose sides. Souvanna called upon the U.S. for support and was answered in the affirmative by President Lyndon B. Johnson, who was eager to support a rightist/neutralist alliance in Laos. In November 1963 General Maxwell D. Taylor, chairman of the Joint Chiefs of Staff had proposed that U.S. armed reconnaissance missions be conducted over Laos as part of a two phase program that would warn Hanoi of U.S. determination to support the South Vietnamese government. The missions were to take place along North Vietnamese infiltration routes then developing in the Laotian panhandle.

On 19 May 1964 low-level photo reconnaissance flights (codenamed Yankee Team) over southern Laos were authorized and launched by RF-101 Voodoo aircraft. When they were fired upon during a mission, escort aircraft were provided. Two days later American aircraft began flying low-level photo recon missions over the northern part of the country, serving as the beginning of the American aerial commitment to the covert war.

=== Covert war ===
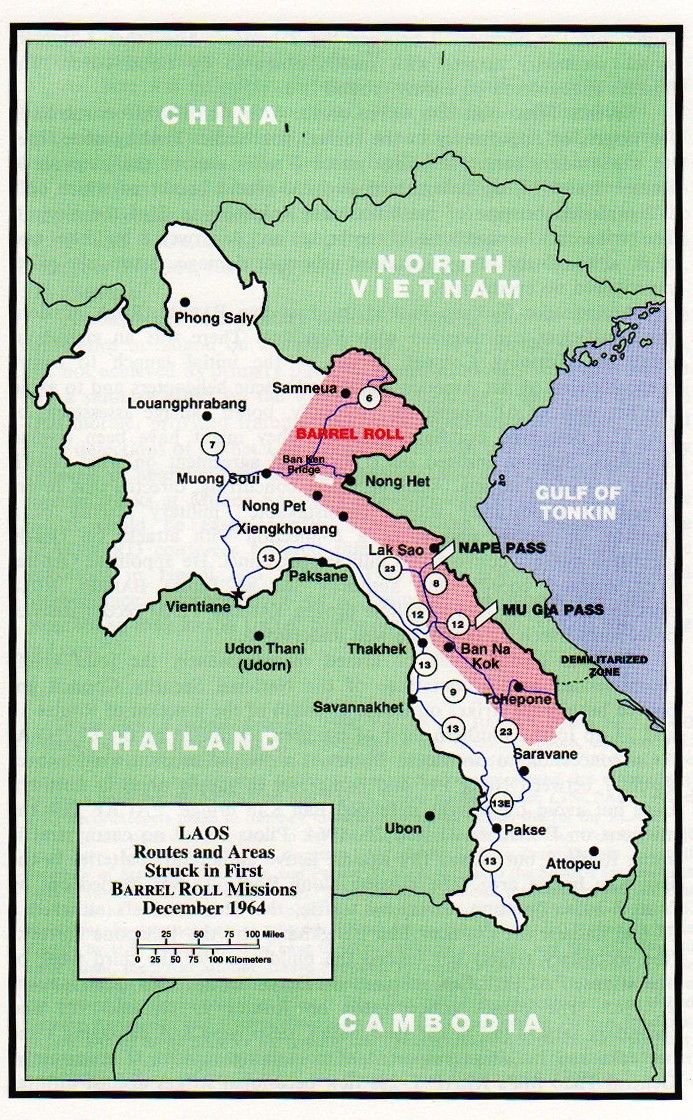
Barrel Roll operational area, 1964

For the Americans, Laos became almost exclusively an air war, a reversal of the role air power played in the conflict in neighboring South Vietnam. In Laos, the USAF applied conventional air power in the support of an unconventional ground war. The mission of the USAF was to seal off the southern Mekong River valley, thus providing a buffer for Thailand; insulating the Vientiane government from direct communist threat; draining PAVN manpower and resources; and interdiction of the approaches to the Ho Chi Minh trail.

For U.S. interests, the aerial interdiction effort against the trail and the protection of Thailand were preeminent, and they became the raison d'être for the covert war in the northeast. According to U.S. Secretary of State Dean Rusk, after 1964 and the increasing U.S. commitment to South Vietnam, "Laos was only the wart on the hog."

Originally, the American arrangement in Laos was based on the premise that the situation in South Vietnam would be controlled within a year or two. A holding action in Laos was all that was thought necessary. No one expected that the conflict would last ten years. Air Force historian Colonel Perry F. Lamy described Washington's view of the situation succinctly:

Since the fate of Laos did not depend on a military solution in the air or on the ground in Laos and could only be decided by the outcome in Vietnam, winning the war against the DRV (North Vietnam) in northern Laos was not the objective. Instead, maintaining access to the country was paramount and keeping the Royal Lao government in power became the primary objective.

For North Vietnam, Laos was also a "limited war" with goals and objectives that were tied to its continued use of the Ho Chi Minh trail. The covert nature of the North Vietnamese logistical effort through Laos also had to be maintained in order to support the fiction that the conflict in South Vietnam was a popular uprising that was not directed by the north.

Back in 1959 Vang Pao, a Laotian Lieutenant Colonel of the minority Hmong tribe, had been taken under the wing of the CIA effort in Laos. The highland Hmong were more aggressive than the lowland Lao and Vang Pao was quickly elevated to their leadership in hopes of creating a paramilitary force that would counter the Pathet Lao in the northeast. Historian John Prados believed that the need to keep the Vientiane government weak, and to give free rein to the Hmong army, flew in the face of fostering the type of national government that could defeat the Pathet Lao. During 1961, the first weapons were delivered to the Hmong and their training was begun. Nine CIA specialists, nine U.S. Army Special Forces personnel, and 99 Thai members of the Police Aerial Reconnaissance Unit (PARU) participated in the training and equipping of what became known as the Armée Clandestine or the secret army.

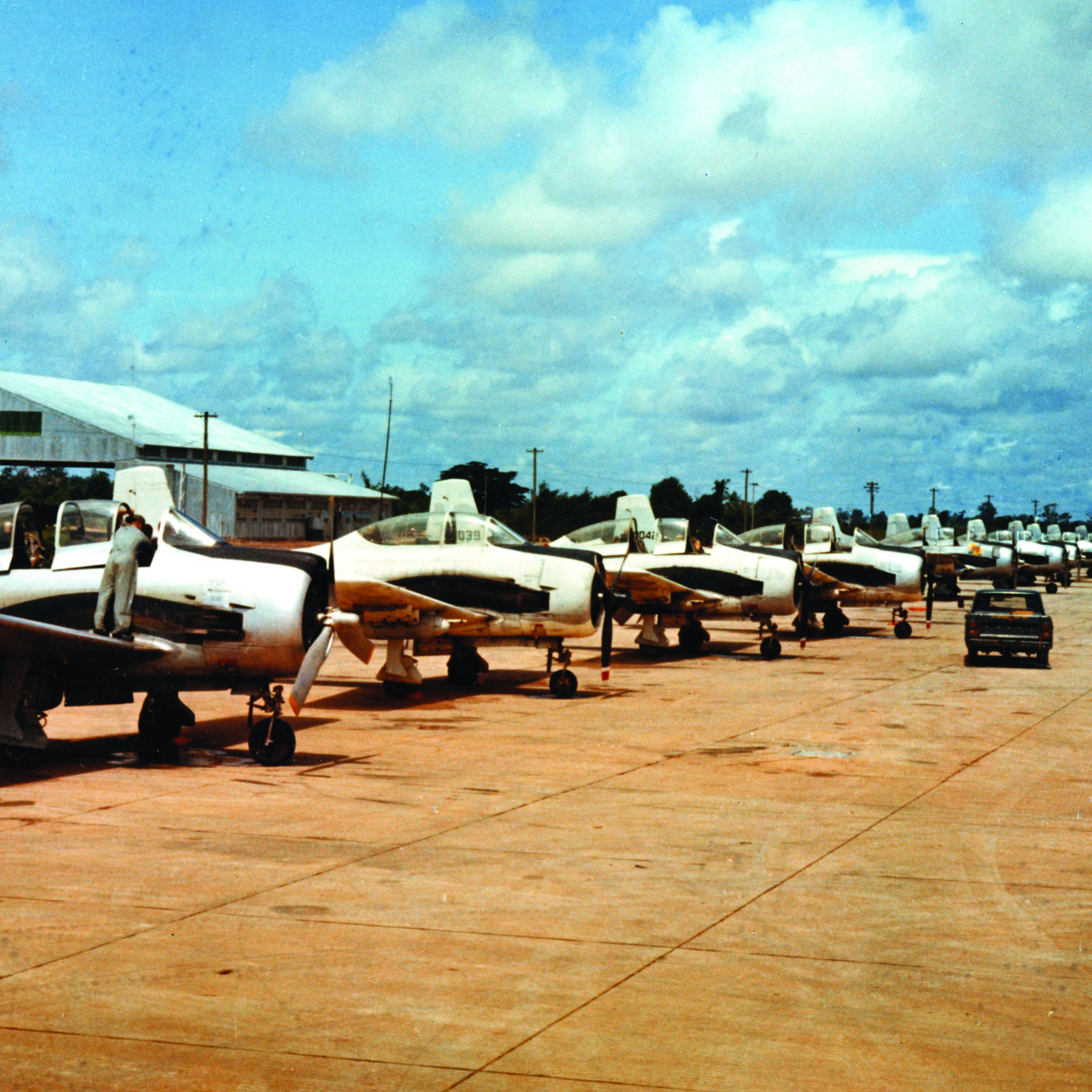
North American T-28Ds in Laos

The neutralization agreement forced the abandonment of the Hmong program, but that was not going to last long. Due to North Vietnamese violations of the agreement, President John F. Kennedy authorized a return to covert activities in 1963. The previous year the CIA and the Thai military had established "Headquarters 333" at Udon Thani, which acted as a joint U.S./Thai command center for covert military and intelligence collection activities in Laos. By the end of 1963, the numbers of the Hmong army had grown to 10,000. To supply the Hmong and Royal Lao armies with more firepower, the Thai government covertly dispatched artillery units to northeastern Laos. Logistical airlift for the covert effort was provided by Air America, Bird and Son, and Continental Air Services, all of which were CIA proprietary airlines.

The next stage of the military evolution took place during mid-March 1964, when the USAF began Project Waterpump, a program to train Laotian, Thai, Hmong, and Air America aircrews in flight and maintenance of U.S.-supplied AT-28 Trojan ground-attack aircraft. This training was conducted by Detachment 6, 1st Air Commando Wing personnel at Udon Thani. The first mission in support of Vang Pao's forces took place on 25 May. Eventually, the Royal Laotian Air Force would consist of five wings of ten aircraft each. Water Pump could never produce enough pilots, however, since graduation rates barely exceeded the death rate of graduates, who simply flew until they died. The American "civilian pilots" program was phased out in 1966 and Detachment 6 (which continued its training program) was absorbed by the 606th Air Commando Squadron in the same year. In 1967 the 606th was integrated into the 56th Special Operations Wing. The air program did, however, create the world's only guerrilla army with air superiority.

=== Field Marshal ===
According to Kennedy's "Country Team" directive of 29 May 1961, all U.S. government agencies operating in a foreign nation were to be placed under the direct supervision of the ambassador. Within Laos that meant the U.S. military was under civilian control, since according to the neutralization agreement, there could never be a senior U.S. military commander within the country. The covert war was, therefore, going to be planned and directed by a civilian within the walls of the embassy.

The American official most associated with the conflict in Laos was Ambassador William H. Sullivan, who served from December 1964 until June 1969. He was also one of the most controversial. Considered brilliant by most and tyrannical by many, Sullivan was despised by the American high command (both Army and Air Force) in Saigon, Sullivan's demand that he alone maintain complete control over every aspect of American military operations in Laos and the stringent restrictions that he imposed upon those operations, earned him few friends among the military. General William C. Westmoreland, overall commander of U.S. forces in South Vietnam sarcastically referred to Sullivan as the "Field Marshal." Few of his detractors, however, considered the difficulties of the ambassador's position. He had to balance the competing interests of the CIA, the Seventh Air Force, MACV and the Thais, and this had to be done without alienating Souvanna, an ally in all but name who acquiesced to almost every U.S. action within his country, short of outright invasion.

The most senior military officer in-country was the AIRA, the ambassador's air attaché, an Air Force colonel. The air attaché office originally consisted of that officer and six other personnel. The burgeoning air programs in Laos however, dictated the dispatch of 117 more Air Force personnel during 1966. The USAF conducted its operations under the aegis of Project 404, whose mission was to support the Royal Laotian military, the clandestine Hmong army, and to support project personnel, who coordinated the operational end of covert activities in Laos. Eventually, five air operations centers were created in Laos – at Vientiane, Pakse, Savannakhet, Long Tieng, and Luang Prabang. These centers supported the ambassador with intelligence, administrative services, and communications as well as the actual air operations under a program called Palace Dog.

After the initiation of Operation Rolling Thunder, the sustained aerial campaign against North Vietnam that had begun on 5 March 1965, the Barrel Roll area of operations was divided on 3 April. Barrel Roll was to continue in the northeast while the southern portion of the area, where interdiction missions against the Ho Chi Minh trail were paramount, was redesignated Tiger Hound. Command and control of that area was handed over to MACV in Saigon.

At a 29 March 1965 Southeast Asia Coordinating Committee meeting at Udon Thani, attended by Sullivan, representatives from the 2nd Air Division, MACV, and Air America, responsibilities within the Barrel Roll operational area were ironed out. Command and control of the air program would remain in the ambassador's hands. Operational control of U.S. air assets devolved from the commander-in-chief, Pacific Forces (CINCPAC) in Honolulu through his air deputy at Pacific Air Forces or PACAF, to the 2nd Air Division (after 1 April 1966, the Seventh Air Force). Targets could be requested by the Royal Lao government, the CIA or by MACV.

Northern Laos, however, was not going to be a priority for the Americans. It was decided at the Honolulu Executive Conference of April 1965 that U.S. aircraft could be used for interdiction in Laos only after close air support needs were met in South Vietnam. Westmoreland was also granted veto power over bombing, interdiction, and reconnaissance programs outside territorial South Vietnam. That decision placed Barrel Roll behind South Vietnam, Rolling Thunder, and Steel Tiger in order of precedence. Only an estimated two percent of the total U.S. aerial effort in Southeast Asia was going to be utilized in northern Laos.

== On the offensive (1964–1970) ==
=== Barrel Roll begins ===
On 12 December 1964, Barrel Roll was approved by Souvanna. The program originally consisted of two U.S. bombing sorties per week by no more than four aircraft in each strike. Most U.S. strike aircraft flew from bases in Thailand; under the U.S.-Thai agreement, the aircraft had to first fly to South Vietnam, land, and then take off again for Laos. By 24 December, six armed reconnaissance missions were being conducted per day, but failed to draw the hoped-for reaction from Hanoi.

The aircraft used in the covert war were an odd assortment of vintage propeller-driven attack aircraft, high-performance jet fighter-bombers, and World War II-era cargo airplanes. Most of the close air support missions flown in the northeast were conducted by Douglas A-1 Skyraiders and AT-28 Trojans. These propeller-driven Korean War-era aircraft came into their own in Southeast Asia, where their heavy ordnance loads, long loiter times, and high maneuverability at low altitudes made them more effective than the Air Force's "fast movers"—jet aircraft.

One of the first American activities in support of the Hmong had been the establishment of Lima Sites, rough air strips across the country; during the early 1960s their number had grown to 200.

Hmong forces, PAVN, and Pathet Lao fought to control the strategic Plain of Jars, a 500 square miles (1,300 km^{2}) plateau north and northeast of Vientiane, covered with grass and small hills.

It quickly became evident that the cyclical pattern of the monsoon weather would dictate the timing and pace of military operations in the northeast. From November through May (the dry season), North Vietnamese and Pathet Lao forces advanced out of Sam Neua Province along Route 6 and out of the Barthelemy Pass through Ban Ban toward the Plain of Jars. The lack of roads and the primitive state of those that did exist forced the communists to stretch their lines of communication taut, inviting counterattack. Vang Pao's forces did this from June through October (the wet season), using air power, air mobility, and guerrilla tactics to push the communists back to their starting places.

Continuous U.S. air support for Barrel Roll operations was provided by the aircraft of the 602nd and 606th Special Operations Squadrons, elements of the 56th Air Commando Wing, based at Nakhon Phanom Royal Thai Air Force Base, Thailand. On 25 October 1967, they were joined by the 22nd Special Operations Squadron. Pre-planned airstrikes in the Barrel Roll area were rare. Until 1968, most U.S. jet fighter-bomber sorties only occurred when aircraft were returning to Thailand from Rolling Thunder missions carrying unexpended ordnance loads. They would then be directed to targets in northeastern Laos.

Electronic tactical air navigation (TACAN) became a necessity in Laos, where mountain peaks and unexpected bad weather made flying extremely hazardous, especially for older aircraft. This problem was solved by establishing unmanned Air Force stations that broadcast continuous radio transmissions, allowing aerial navigation from fixed geographic reference points. The Air Force also emplaced TSQ-81 radar sites in the north and northeast to direct Rolling Thunder missions over North Vietnam.

=== Rules of engagement ===
During the covert war in Laos, there was continual friction between the Air Force commanders at Udon Thani and Saigon and the embassy in Vientiane. Richard Secord, then an Air Force captain serving as liaison between the CIA and the Seventh Air Force, complained that:

We were always trying to pry assets out of the Air Force at times and places they didn't want to go. You had to push 'em, cajole 'em, at times threaten them... My people were always trying to corrupt the process because the process itself simply was not structured for our kind of war... It was a continual frustration.

Secord's criticism may have been a little extreme. The Department of Defense had created the 7th/13 Air Force at Udon in November 1965 for the express purpose of conducting the air war in Laos. According to historian Timothy Castle, Sullivan relegated the USAF commander and his staff "to the status of clerks hired to carry out his airpower decisions." The unconventional arrangement bred frustration and the 7th/13th constantly harped about the use of its air assets in northern Laos. There was constant criticism over the use of air power "serving targets" or utilizing modern fighter-bombers as "long-range artillery." It was very difficult for the USAF to grasp that a guerrilla force did not fight like a conventional army.

The aerial rules of engagement applied in Laos (which prescribed the offensive action of pilots and the locations and circumstances under which offensive actions could be taken) were created to protect the civilian population of the country. To the American pilots that conducted the missions, however, they became complex to the point of incomprehensibility. The rules were constantly altered and elaborated upon by the political decision makers in Washington and Vientiane and bore little relation to the reality on the ground. There were different rules for every type of activity, for each different branch of service, and in each military region.

Examples from the early days of aerial operations stipulated that there would be no use of napalm in Laos, that no PAVN trucks could be struck more than 200 meters from a road, and that no enemy forces could be bombed within 1,000 meters of a pagoda. Although these restrictions were later altered, there were always others to take their place. There were "no bomb zones" that granted sanctuaries to PAVN and Pathet Lao forces. Pagodas and suspected PAVN hospitals (which were unmarked) were simply turned into ammunition dumps, supply caches, and anti-aircraft sites by an enemy that intently studied American actions and adjusted to them.

=== Butterflies and Ravens ===
One of the key problems for the early phase of the U.S. air program in Laos was the lack of forward air control (FAC) that would have pinpointed ground targets in the rugged, jungle-covered terrain for strike aircraft. The USAF had no such aircraft in Laos, or anywhere else, having phased out its own programs after the Korean War. In 1963 the Air Force dispatched four "sheep-dipped" Air Commandos of the Combat Control Teams to Laos to work with the CIA. Combat Control Teams consisted of personnel who parachuted into a forward zone and provided air control for the aerial delivery of another unit (usually paratroops).

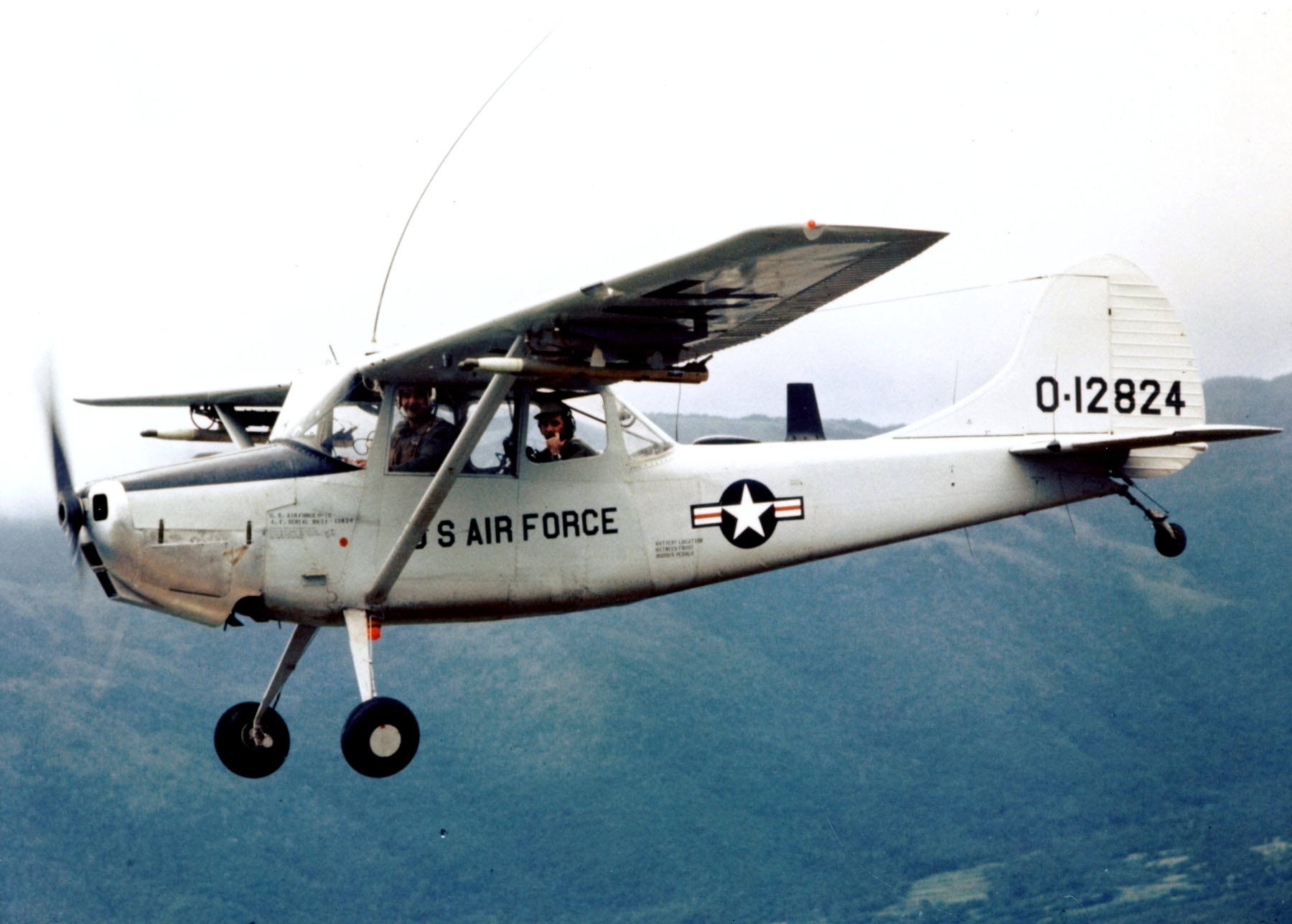
The Cessna O-1 Bird Dog FAC aircraft was unmarked when flown by Raven Forward Air Controllers.

The Air Commando sergeants, James J. Stanford and Charles Larimore Jones discovered the problem, obtained manuals on forward air control and went to work to resolve the issue. In short order, they arranged rides in Air America and Continental Air Services aircraft and began marking ground targets. The expedient worked and the sergeants, using radio call sign Butterfly, succeeded brilliantly.

The program continued for three years (until 1966) without any questions being raised by higher headquarters. It was not until a visit by General William Momyer, commander of the Seventh Air Force, that the unconventional nature of the program became a problem. Discovering that the Butterflies were neither officers nor pilots, Momyer was incensed and ordered that "that will cease." The program that replaced the Butterflies (and which became an even more "sensitive" issue with Momyer) would contain some of the most colorful personnel of the covert war – the Raven FACs.

The Ravens were volunteer USAF officers who already had 500 flying hours (six months) as FACs in South Vietnam and who would serve six-month tours in Laos. There were always going to be shortages of both personnel and aircraft in the new program. Only six Ravens were assigned between 1966 and 1968 to control the ever-expanding amounts of U.S. airpower being utilized in Laos. Even at the height of the program, when they would control one-third to two-thirds of the tactical air strikes in the Barrel Roll area, there were never more than 22 Ravens.

The Ravens flew the entire gamut of U.S. observation aircraft, from O-1 Bird Dogs, and U-17s, to T-28s and, eventually more modern O-2 Skymasters and OV-10 Broncos. Each Raven carried aloft a Laotian observer, who could provide almost immediate clearance for air strikes. On the ground, Laotian Forward Air Guides (FAGs) also called in for air support missions.

=== See-saw war ===
From 1965 through 1968, the war in the northeast followed the monsoon cycle, with dry season communist offensives followed by wet season Hmong (and later Thai) counteroffensives. Each year the conflict slowly escalated. PAVN would introduce more (and better equipped) units and the U.S. would counter by the application of more airpower, producing a strategic stalemate.

In July 1966, PAVN and Pathet Lao forces consisting of three infantry regiments, one independent infantry battalion, and an artillery battalion, seized the town of Nam Bac and then established a defensive line north of Luang Prabang. The communist advance, however, was gradually eroded due to the destruction of its supplies by air power. Vang Pao's forces counterattacked in August, driving the enemy back to within 45 miles (72 km) of the North Vietnamese border. More communist forces then entered the battle, forcing the Hmong back.

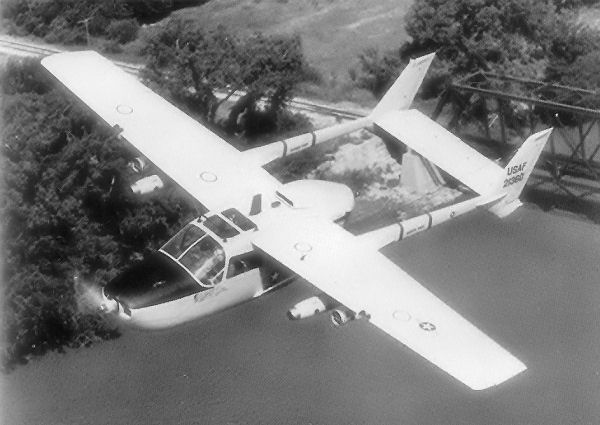
Cessna O-2 Skymaster FAC aircraft

The communists moved out to take the Plain of Jars again in 1967. Laotian victories were few and far between and by the end of the year the situation had become critical, even with the support provided by the American and Laotian Air Forces. The PAVN, having a complete understanding of the American military system, began to attack TACAN facilities. U.S. intelligence indicated that between December 1967 and August 1968, the combined strength of PAVN and Pathet Lao forces increased from about 51,000 to over 110,000. The PAVN contingent comprised an estimated 34,000 combat troops, 6,000 advisors, and 18,000 support troops. On 6 December Lima Site 44 was overrun and on the 25th PAVN forces captured Lima Site 61, the site of a mobile facility. All of these attacks were part of a coordinated effort to reduce the ability of the Americans to strike the communist logistical system during the Tet Offensive.

In coordination with Tet, PAVN and the Pathet Lao launched a series of coordinated offensives in northern and southern Laos during 1968. The dry season offensive in northern Laos began with the communists again seizing the Nam Bac region of Military Region 1. This they adroitly managed, killing 200 Royal Army troops and capturing 2,400 more by 13 January. The offensive ground forward, slowly seizing more territory in the north.

In the panhandle, the Laotian garrison at Ban Houi Sane, along Route 9 and 21 miles (34 km) west of the U.S. Marines' Khe Sanh Combat Base, was overrun by the PAVN 24th Regiment, 314th Division supported by Soviet-built PT-76 tanks. Further south, PAVN Group 565 advanced in Khammouane Province, seizing the rice harvest and placing themselves in position to overrun the cities of Saravane and Attopeu with little forewarning. The offensive then wound down and PAVN forces in southern Laos reorganized.

On 12 January, one of the most unusual aerial battles of the Vietnam War took place. Two Soviet-built An-2 Colt biplanes of the North Vietnamese Vietnam People's Air Force attacked Lima Site 85 atop a craggy peak known as Phou Pha Thi. An Air America Bell 205 helicopter, which had taken off to avoid air-dropped 120 mm mortar rounds, then began chasing one of the Colts which had already been struck by ground fire. The aircraft crashed while making evasive maneuvers. The Bell then went after the other Colt, and the helicopter's crew chief fired an AK-47 through a sliding window, shooting the biplane down.

The PAVN were not through with Phou Pha Thi. The combined TACAN/TSQ-81 site was, by January, controlling 55 percent of Rolling Thunder strikes in northern North Vietnam and 20 percent of the strikes in the Barrel Roll area. On 11 March, Lima Site 85 was struck by an attack spearheaded by the sappers of the PAVN 41st Dac Cong Battalion and supported by the 923rd Infantry Battalion and the site was quickly overrun. Five of the USAF technicians manning the site managed to escape, but 11 more were missing in action.

To replace Lima Site 85, Vang Pao moved against Moung Son and Na Khang, where a new site was erected in July. During July and August, the Hmong forces were assisted by 742 U.S. airstrikes, while another 450 others were conducted throughout the Barrel Roll area. 1968 had proved to be a turning point in the conflict, with PAVN forces displaying unprecedented determination in maintaining pressure against Royal forces, regardless of the weather cycles.

To preempt the traditional wet season offensive in 1969, the USAF approved a major offensive bombing campaign within Barrel Roll named Operation Raindance. It was timed to coincide with spoiling operations that Vang Pao had planned against the Plain of Jars. The operation began on 17 March and launched 80 strikes per day for 12 days. Raindance was extended through 7 April, by which time 730 U.S. sorties had been flown. On 22 May the Air Force conducted Operation Stranglehold, a five-day campaign focused on Routes 6 and 7, PAVN's logistical lifeline. Regardless, the PAVN launched Campaign Thoan Thang (Total Victory) during late June and managed to take Muang Soui with the assistance of armored units. A total of 103 Air Force and 44 RLAF strikes were flown in the defense of the town, but to no avail. Part of the PAVN success could be attributed to the record number of its units then available in the northeast. Seven new battalions having arrived since April.

In June, Sullivan was replaced as ambassador by G. McMurtrie Godley, who immediately loosened the rules of engagement and increased the bombing campaign in the north and northeast. The results were almost immediate. Nearly 50 percent of the population of the once heavily populated Plain of Jars had moved into refugee camps in the south. Refugee rolls for the Agency for International Development, which had averaged 130,000 between 1964 and 1968, jumped to 230,000 in February 1970.

On 6 August 1969, in Military Region 2, Hmong forces launched a major counterattack, the Kou Kiet (Redeem Honor) Campaign, against the communists on the Plain of Jars and in the Xieng Kouang area, supported by its own air units and the USAF. The offensive was a success due not to American airpower, but to unseasonably rainy weather: 46 inches (1,200 mm) (as opposed to the normal 16 in (410 mm)) fell in July, cutting sharply into the communist logistical flow. After the weather broke, the Hmong were supported by 145 sorties per day. Communist forces, cut off from resupply, fled to the west. For the first time since 1961 all of the strategic Plain of Jars was under government control. This course of events led Sullivan to declare: "We believe that damage to the enemy represents the best results per sortie by tactical air in Southeast Asia." By the end of the campaign in October, the operation had netted 25 tanks, 113 vehicles, six million rounds of ammunition, 6,400 weapons, and 202,000 US gallons (760,000 L) of fuel. That summer, sorties throughout the Barrel Roll area had risen from an average of 300 missions per month to an average 200 sorties per day.

== On the defensive (1970–1972) ==
=== Beginning of the end ===
The nature of the conflict in the northeast changed radically in mid-September 1969, when the communists were reinforced by the remaining two regiments of the 312th Division (the 165th and 209th), the refitted 316th Division, the 866th PAVN Infantry Regiment], the 16th PAVN Artillery Regiment, a tank company, six sapper and engineer battalions and ten Pathet Lao battalions. On 11 February 1970, these units launched Operation 139, and by the 20th the Plain of Jars had been taken. Royal Lao forces withdrew to Muang Soui and five days later they abandoned Xieng Khouang. On 18 March Xam Thong fell and Vang Pao's stronghold at Long Tieng was threatened. As a stopgap, Washington approved Operation Goodlook, the first usage of Boeing B-52 Stratofortress bombers in northern Laos. During the first mission on 18 February 36 bombers delivered 1,078 tons of bombs. On 25 April the battered communist forces fell back, but the 316th PAVN Division and the 866th PAVN Infantry Regiment remained behind to assist the Pathet Lao.

A CIA study concluded during the year that "About the most positive thing that can be said about Laos is that it still exists as a non-communist state." Souvanna was then 69 years old, visibly losing his vigour, and he had no apparent successor. The see-saw, seasonal conflict dragged on, but at the end of each cycle, the balance was somewhat more favorable to PAVN and the Pathet Lao.

Due to the withdrawal of U.S. forces under the policy of Vietnamization, from 1 November 1968 until 23 February 1973, Barrel Roll competed for a share of diminishing U.S. tactical air assets. In December 1968, approximately 700 American strike aircraft had been available in-theater. By the spring of 1972, that number had fallen to 313. On 18 July, the Nakhon Phanom-based 22nd Special Operations Squadron was disbanded. Its sister squadron, the 602nd Special Operations Squadron, closed out on 20 December, leaving only the 1st Special Operations Squadron at Nakhon Phanom to support Royal Laotian ground operations. The RLAF attempted to make up for the diminishing number of American sorties. During 1968 the Laotians flew 10,000 strike sorties. During 1970 through 1972 that number increased to over 30,000 in each year.

Under the existing command and control arrangement between the CIA, the AIRA, and the Seventh Air Force, the Air Force wielded little actual control over air support. In order to increase its dominance, a reduction in the role of the Raven FACS was called for. Instead, greater use was to be made of Nail FACs from Nakhon Phanom's 23rd Tactical Air Support Squadron which had recently begun transitioning to OV-10 aircraft. In the end, the Nails made increasing appearances over Military Region 2, but they never seriously encroached on the role of the Ravens.

On 2 February 1971 PAVN and Pathet Lao forces launched their dry season offensive (Operation 74B) to recapture the Plain of Jars. PAVN forces taking part in the operation included the 316th Division, the 165th Regiment of the 312th Division, the 866th Infantry Regiment, and three sapper battalions (the 13th, 27th, and 41st). Communist forces rolled west and southwest, securing territory in anticipation of a possible cease-fire. By February they had occupied the entire Plain of Jars, Long Tieng had been surrounded, and, for the first time since 1962, Pathet Lao forces were camped within sight of the royal capital of Luang Prabang.

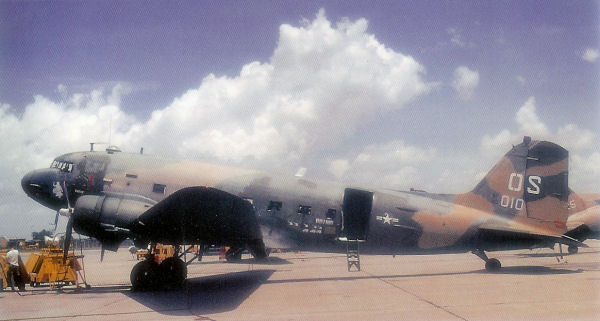
Douglas AC-47 gunship

Ominously, PAVN and the Pathet Lao did not withdraw to North Vietnam during the rainy season. Previously during the conflict, air mobility by STOL aircraft into the Lima Sites had provided the Hmong with an advantage over the road-bound PAVN and Pathet Lao forces. This advantage was now going to be overcome by road improvement and the prepositioning of supplies which allowed the communists to maintain year-round use of their lines of communication.

The American command in Saigon and the politicians in Washington were opposed to a wet season Hmong offensive, supporting instead a holding action on the edge of the Plain of Jars as a prelude to a possible cease-fire. Washington also insisted that U.S. airpower be used to interdict PAVN supply lines, not as close air support for ground operations. Vang Pao took up the offensive anyway, but his forces could only occupy half of the Plain before his offensive sputtered out at the end of July.

There was also a growing public awareness in the U.S. of military activities in Laos. During October 1969, Senator Stuart Symington (D-MO) chaired hearings of the Subcommittee of the Senate Foreign Relations Committee on Security Agreements and Commitments Abroad. The testimony of subpoenaed witnesses revealed the history of U.S. involvement in the covert commitment to Laos. Due to the closed nature of the sessions and its heavily censored transcript, however, the nature and extent of that commitment was still very little understood by the American public.

That changed, however, with the publication of the Pentagon Papers, which disclosed the earliest stages of Yankee Team, Barrel Roll, and the Thai commitment. President Richard M. Nixon was eventually forced to disclose the extent of U.S. participation, which further weakened ability of the U.S. to respond to the increasing PAVN and Pathet Lao threat. The spring of 1972 was not a happy one in either Washington D.C. or Vientiane. A U.S. Congressional delegation, after investigating the situation on the ground in Laos, reported that "No one we met in Laos, American or Lao, seemed to have any prescription for the future other than to continue what's being done now."

=== Running out of resources ===
Vietnamization was catching up with the conflict in Laos. During the 1970–1971 dry season, USAF strike missions in support of Hmong operations had dropped by 70 percent from the previous year from 114 sorties per day to 38. The grinding nature of the conflict was also having a cumulative effect on the adult male population of the Hmong. Severe attrition had forced the Hmong into a numbers game that they could not win. Although only contributing 13 percent of Laotian military strength, Vang Pao's men accounted for 70 percent of the total casualties inflicted on government forces.

In March 1971 South Vietnamese forces, supported by U.S. air power, launched Operation Lam Son 719, the long-awaited offensive to cut the Ho Chi Minh trail in southeastern Laos. However, the result was a failure. PAVN and Pathet Lao forces had already begun to expand the trail system westward, pushing Royal Lao forces toward the Mekong, slowly extending the territory it controlled, moving west of the trail and creating a larger buffer zone between its logistical system and the South Vietnamese. After Lam Son 719, that process accelerated. Hanoi's effort was simplified by the fact that the Royalist forces in the south had little experience fighting PAVN and they were quickly overwhelmed. Inept and ineffective were terms utilized to describe their defense. On 30 April 1971 the key town of Attopeu was seized by the PAVN.

Vang Pao himself was not blind to the realities facing his people. He had threatened to launch a mass migration of the Hmong to Thailand on three previous occasions. In November 1969, he tried a different tack, contacting the Pathet Lao and attempted to negotiate a quid pro quo: the Hmong would cease fighting if the communists would allow them to establish a semiautonomous state in Xieng Khouang Province.

The diminishing number of troops available to Vang Pao demanded their replacement by growing numbers of Thai volunteers (Project Unity), who increasingly took over the ground war in the north. By the end of 1971, the entire 55-man battalion of Thais were in action, whose total numbers were 6,000–8,000 men. During the following year, those numbers had ballooned to 17,800. The total force eventually deployed was three artillery and 27 infantry battalions.

== Withdrawal (1972–1973) ==
=== Talking and fighting ===
By October 1971 Souvanna had little alternative but to accept the Pathet Lao program as the basis for negotiations. The Pathet Lao agreed to the new negotiating effort and on 16 October, representatives of the party arrived in Vientiane. Two weeks later they were followed by Phoumi Vongvichit, secretary general of the Pathet Lao. Communist demands included: a cessation of the U.S. bombing of Lao territory; withdrawal of all U.S. advisors and military personnel; an election for a new National Assembly; the establishment of a coalition government; and compensation and resettlement for those Lao who had been forcibly relocated would be undertaken. The pace of negotiations in Laos, however, mirrored those in South Vietnam, the impetus of which was determined by the perceived military success of the protagonists.

The dreaded PAVN wet season offensive (Campaign Z) began on 17 December 1971. The multi-division offensive was commanded by Major General Lê Trọng Tấn, who had commanded the PAVN counteroffensive against Operation Lam Son 719. Once again the PAVN rolled across the Plain of Jars and to the outskirts of Long Tieng. This time however, they had brought along a battery of 130mm artillery, which proceeded to pummel the defenders. By 17 January 1972, reinforcement by Unity troops and strikes by B-52s had driven the PAVN from the high ground surrounding the valley, but they could not be pushed out of the area. Tấn then shifted the focus of his forces to the southwest and seized Sam Thong on 18 March. The fighting around Long Tieng did not cease until 28 April.

On 21 May 1972 Royal Lao and Hmong forces, supported by air strikes, attempted to retake the Plain of Jars. The fighting raged for 170 days (until 15 November), but the communists could not be evicted. PAVN and the Pathet Lao claimed to have killed 1,200 enemy troops and to have captured 80. The PAVN/Pathet Lao made additional gains during the year, but failed to overwhelm government forces.

The launching of PAVN's Easter Offensive in April 1972 had the effect of returning major American air assets to the theater and eventually increased the tempo of operations in northeastern Laos. As a result, Royal Lao armed forces, Hmong and Thai mercenaries went on the offensive, as did PAVN and the Pathet Lao, all of whom wished to become "well postured for the peace negotiations." Although there was no provision for a Laotian cease-fire written into the Paris Peace Accords signed on 27 January 1973, it had been verbally agreed between the U.S. and North Vietnamese representatives that one would be instituted within 15 days of the signing of the agreement. The fates of Laos and Cambodia were disposed of in Article 20 of the agreement, in which the North Vietnamese and the U.S. promised to respect the neutrality of both nations and to end their military intervention. Unfortunately, there was no means by which to enforce the agreement. That the North Vietnamese would uphold it, after violating two previous neutrality accords, "took optimism bordering on an act of faith that they would now abandon the ambitions and struggles of thirty years because of a clumsily drafted afterthought in a document they had no intention of honoring anyway."

The Americans were pulling out of Southeast Asia as quickly as negotiations with the North Vietnamese would allow them. Godley, stunned by the diplomatic developments, ruminated that "We had led him (Souvanna) down the garden path. Let's face it, we were cutting and running... Once we were out of Vietnam the only way we could have protected Laos was with an Army corps. It was totally out of the question and we knew it. We were licked." Souvanna then faced a dilemma, sign a separate agreement with the Pathet Lao on almost any terms, or continue the war with no prospect of success. Hanoi was also desirous to obtain a quick agreement with Vientiane. The sooner the fighting in Laos ceased, the sooner the North Vietnamese would obtain unimpeded use of the Ho Chi Minh trail.

On 21 February, Souvanna signed an Agreement on the Restoration of Peace and Reconciliation in Laos between the central government and the Pathet Lao. The agreement was preceded by intense fighting, as both sides attempted to seize as much territory as possible before the cease-fire went into effect. The agreement was moot, however, since Hanoi had no intention of removing its troops or abandoning its logistical system.

=== Cease-fire ===
The cease-fire went into effect on 22 February 1973. Not all of the fighting, however, had ended. This was particularly true around the town of Paksong, the last Royal Laotian stronghold on the Bolaven Plateau – the strategic high ground overlooking the Mekong River. At the request of Souvanna, nine B-52s and 12 U.S. tactical fighters struck the outskirts of the town on 24 February. By mid-month, the bombers had flown 1,417 sorties and struck 286 targets in northern Laos. Once again acceding to a request from Souvanna, B-52s returned for two more days of bombing on 16 and 17 April, dropping ordnance in support of government forces under attack around Ban Tha Vieng on the Plain of Jars.

On 5 April 1974 a coalition government was finally established by a royal decree with Souvanna as president. Due to the defeatism and political deterioration of the rightists within the kingdom, the Pathet Lao moved adroitly, slowly preempting the government and military and soon winning a surprising popularity among the Lao population.

On 4 June, as per the agreement, all U.S. and Thai personnel left the country, leaving 50–60,000 PAVN troops still ensconced within Laos. The previous month an airlift had begun at Long Tieng which evacuated as many of the Hmong as possible to Thailand. They were soon followed by approximately 40,000 others who set out on foot for exile. On 2 December 1975 the coalition government and the monarchy were abolished by the provisional government, which then disestablished itself. The Lao People's Democratic Republic then came into existence.

== Conclusion ==
For 100 months, the USAF, the CIA, and the Thai government had assisted the Royal Lao government in staving off defeat at the hands of its enemies. If one measures the success of Barrel Roll by the priorities assigned to it by the U.S. government and military, it was a success. It had allowed the continuous prosecution of the Steel Tiger (and, post-1968, Operation Commando Hunt) interdiction campaigns against the Ho Chi Minh trail by keeping the “neutralists” in power. At the time of the cease-fire, communist forces controlled two-thirds of the land area and one-third of the population of Laos, approximately the same amounts that they had under their control in 1961. The imposition of a strategic stalemate had prevented the fall of the Vientiane government, which accomplished the secondary goal of the operation, protecting Thailand from communist attack (however unrealistic that threat appears today). This stalemate had been achieved with the loss of 131 U.S. aircraft between 1964 and 1973, a very low loss rate when compared to the operations discussed above. In his work Vietnam Air Losses, author Chris Hobson lists only 118 losses – 113 Air Force, four Navy, and one Marine Corps in Northern Laos.

For the USAF, this success was achieved by conducting a shoestring operation, one that was fourth in priority for American air assets behind operations in South Vietnam, Operation Rolling Thunder, and Steel Tiger. After the close-out of aerial operations over North Vietnam, Barrel Roll still remained in last place. During its existence the campaign had utilized an average of only ten percent of the Air Force's tactical air effort in Southeast Asia. During the 1972 Nguyen Hue PAVN offensive, the number of airstrikes over northern Laos was reduced to only five percent of the total.

There were problems - inflated bomb damage assessment reports during operations in northeastern Laos were common, but the cause was not difficult to discern. Mountainous terrain, poor weather, ground cover, the lack of ground forces for confirmation, and the language barrier all contributed to overestimation of the damage inflicted on communist forces by the bombing effort. The result was a skewed sense of the effectiveness and the capabilities of the campaign. The results of the campaign (which were made obvious by the repeating seasonal nature of PAVN and Pathet Lao offensives), however, indicated that American airpower was quite effective.

The covert war in Laos was a Cold War insurgency/counterinsurgency, low-intensity conflict. It also remains one of only a few military operations of the Vietnam War about which both major belligerent parties (the U.S. and North Vietnam) are still reluctant to discuss openly their participation. For the North Vietnamese, this is understandable. Hanoi has no more incentive to discuss its operations today than it had in the 1960s or 1970s. Although the U.S. has been more open about its participation, the covert war remains a touchy subject.

== Impact ==
According to a 2024 study, the areas of Laos that were bombed more heavily by the United States during the conflict subsequently had persistently worse economic outcomes.

== Sources ==
=== Published government documents ===
- Nalty, Bernard C., The War Against Trucks: Aerial Interdiction in Southern Laos, 1969–1972. Washington DC: Air Force History and Museums Program, 2005.
- Schlight, John, The War in South Vietnam: The Years of the Offensive, 1965–1968. Washington DC: Air Force History and Museums Program, 1999.

=== Secondary sources ===
- Hobson, Chris, Vietnam Air Losses: United States Air Force, Navy, and Marine Corps Fixed-Wing Aircraft Losses in Southeast Asia, 1961–1973. Hinckley, UK: Midland Publishing, 2001.
- Littauer, Raphael and Norman Uphoff, eds. The Air War in Indochina. Boston: Beacon Press, 1972.

=== Biography ===
- Briggs, Thomas Leo (2009). Cash on delivery : CIA special operations during the secret war in Laos. Rockville, MD: Rosebank Press. ISBN 978-0-9841059-4-6.
- Cain, Jim (2010). Butterfly 70/Raven 41. Peyton, CO: Peak Vista Press. OCLC 753468377.
