= Reeves AN/MSQ-77 Bomb Directing Central =

US military computerized tracking radar

Reeves AN/MSQ-77 Bomb Directing Central Combat Skyspot/Combat Proof radar beacon colloq: Radar Bomb Directing Central
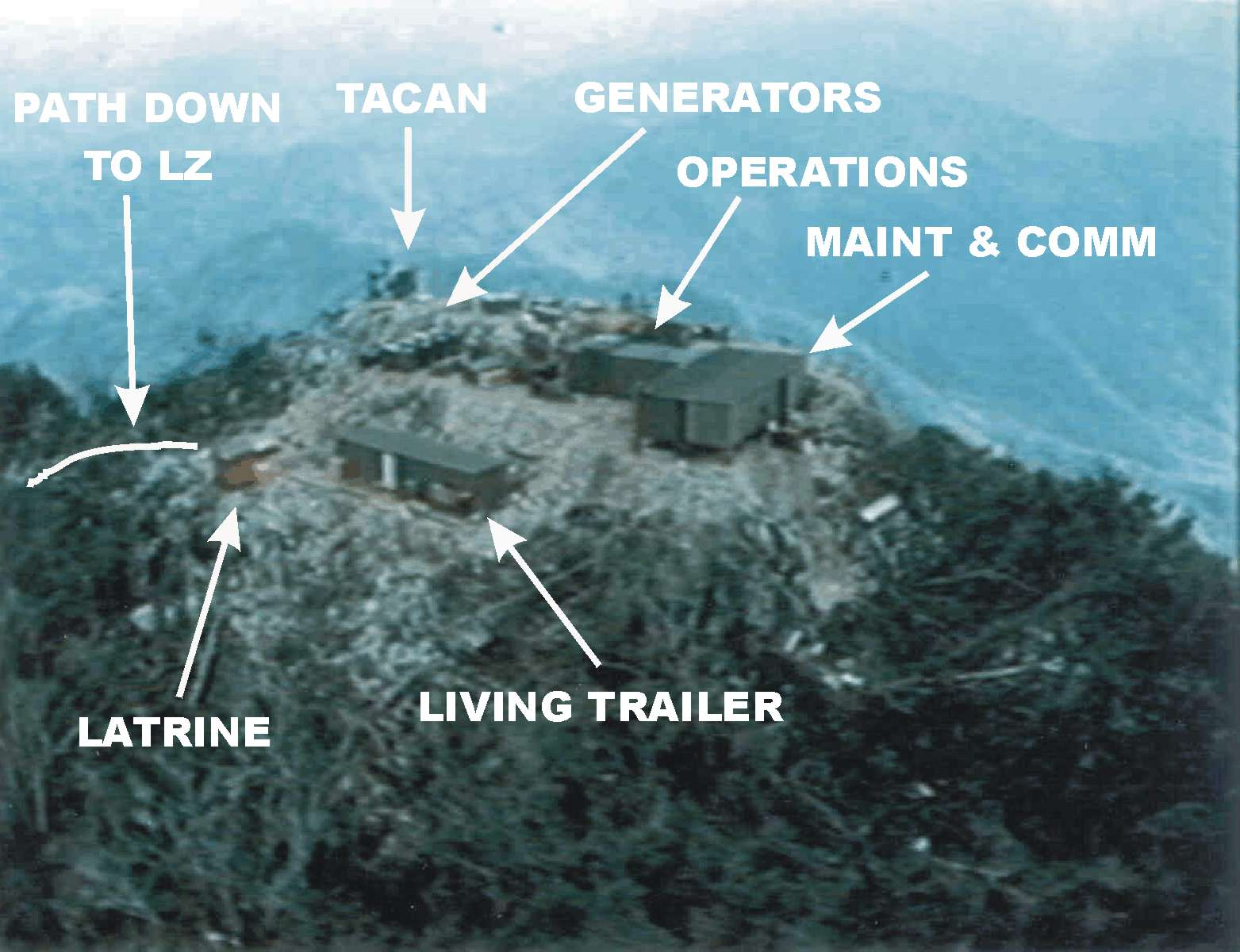
- An AN/MSQ-77 at Lima Site 85
- Country of origin: United States
- Manufacturer: Reeves Instrument Corporation
- Type: Site area
- Frequency: 8500 to 9600 MHz (X band)
- PRF: 600 pulses/second or 300 pulses/second
- Pulsewidth: .25 microsecond
- RPM: 30 cycles/second feedhorn rotation →20 pulses/cycle conical scan signal
- Range: 200 nmi (370 km; 230 mi) beacon track 135 nmi (250 km; 155 mi) skin track 130 nmi (150 mi) UHF radio reliability
- Diameter: 8 ft (2.4 m) Cassegrain antenna
- Precision: tbd in range tbd degrees (radar track) tbd degrees (computer track w/ joystick alignment on CCTV image); GDB ACCURACY <680 ft CEP @ 200 nmi (specification); 486 ft CEP @ 44 nmi (1965 testing); 300-350 ft ave @ ≤100 nmi (1967 ops)

The Reeves AN/MSQ-77 Bomb Directing Central, Radar (nickname "Miscue 77") was a United States Air Force automatic tracking radar/computer system for command guidance of aircraft. It was often used during Vietnam War bomb runs at nighttime and during bad weather. Developed from the Reeves AN/MSQ-35, the AN/MSQ-77 reversed the process of Radar Bomb Scoring by continually estimating the bomb impact point before bomb release with a vacuum tube ballistic computer. Unlike "Course Directing Central" systems which guided aircraft to a predetermined release point, the AN/MSQ-77 algorithm continuously predicted bomb impact points during the radar track while the AN/MSQ-77's control commands adjusted the aircraft course. A close air support regulation prohibited AN/MSQ-77 Combat Skyspot bombing within 1,000 yd (910 m) of friendly forces unless authorized by a Forward Air Controller, and "on several occasions" strikes were as close as 273 yd (250 m).

Post-war the MSQ-77 was used on US and other training ranges for Radar Bomb Scoring (RBS). The AN/MSQ-77 was also periodically used for post-Vietnam commanding of bombers during simulated ground directed bombing to maintain aircrew and radar crew GDB proficiency (RBS could be used to score the simulated GDB mission). Most AN/MSQ-77s were replaced by solid-state equipment near the end of the Cold War.

== History ==
Ground radar systems for automated guidance of aircraft to a predetermined point (e.g., for bomb release using a bombsight or avionics radar) included the July 1951 AN/MPQ-14 Radar Course Directing Central. By 1954, the MARC (Matador Airborne Radio Control) used the AN/MSQ-1A for missile guidance to the terminal dive point, and SAGE GCI provided computer-controlled guidance of aircraft to continuously computed interception points (1958 AN/FSQ-7 Bomarc missile guidance and the later Ground to Air Data Link Subsystem for fighters). Despite the availability of solid-state military guidance computers in 1961, planning for a USAF vacuum-tube trajectory computer/radar system began in early 1965. In October 1965, F-100s tested the AN/MSQ-77 at Matagorda Island General Bombing and Gunnery Range on the Texas Gulf Coast.

In March 1966, AN/MSQ-77 operations using the "reverse MSQ method" began and continued through August 1973 for guiding B-52s and tactical fighters and bombers ("chiefly flown by F-100's"). By March 1967, 15,000 Skyspot sorties had been flown, and raids controlled by AN/MSQ-77s included those of Operation Menu from Bien Hoa Air Base, Operation Niagara, and Operation Arc Light. Additional AN/MSQ-77 missions included those with MC-130 Commando Vault aircraft to clear landing zones and at least 1 helicopter evacuation of wounded on August 13, 1966.

Commando Club
To allow command guidance bombing of Hanoi and Haiphong targets out of range of the initial Skyspot AN/MSQ-77 sites, the "1st CEVG began "Combat Keel" tests using F-4s guided by an MSQ-77 on the USS Thomas J. Gary" in the Gulf of Tonkin during late 1967 after the March 1967 "Combat Target" task force recommended a closer site. By 1 November 1967, the USAF Heavy Green operation had prepared a Laos mountaintop site and installed an MSQ-77 variant in rugged shelters without trailer frames, wheels, etc. for helicopter transport. Although the central's range was limited by the UHF radio reliability for A/C commands during the bomb run, "Commando Club" used a relay aircraft to retransmit communications between Lima Site 85 and the bomber. LS-85's operations ended with the 1968 Battle of Lima Site 85 defeat by sappers after North Vietnam had correlated bombings were occurring during LS-85 transmissions (the site's central and other buildings were destroyed by a later U.S. air raid.)

Additional casualties of AN/MSQ-77 personnel included 1 killed in an enemy rocket attack and 6 Skyspot personnel killed in a 1966 ambush on a survey mission. Following -77 modifications in 1968, subsequent changes included a solid-state digital printer for RBS ("Digital Data System") and implementation of a USAF suggestion for RBS to use a late-1970s programmable calculator to supersede the Bomb Trajectory Group, eliminating alignment procedures for its amplifiers. In 1989, remains of an F-4C Weapon System Officer shot down during a November 10, 1967, AN/MSQ-77 bomb run were recovered in Southeast Asia.

Developed from the AN/MSQ-77 and also used in Vietnam was the monopulse India-band Reeves AN/TSQ-96 Bomb Directing Central with a solid state Univac 1219B ballistic computer (Mark 152 fire control computer), and the AN/MSQ-77/96 systems for GDB were replaced c. 1990 by the US Dynamics AN/TPQ-43 Radar Bomb Scoring Set ("Seek Score"). There were 5 MSQ-77s at Nellis Air Force Base in 1994, and the "MSQ-77 or equivalent" was still listed in 2005 as support equipment for airdrops from Ground Radar Aerial Delivery System (GRADS) aircraft. The AN/MSQ-77 antenna at the "Combat Skyspot Memorial" on Andersen Air Force Base was destroyed by a typhoon c. 2007.

=== Locations ===
Initial AN/MSQ-77 sites were the production plant Reeves-Ely had built in 1958 at Roosevelt Field on East Gate Blvd in Garden City, New York; and the Matagorda Island test site also used for "Busy Skyspot" training of Vietnam crews (moved to Bergstrom AFB in 1970). Deployment sites were the Vietnam War operating locations, the wartime site at the Nellis Range, and post-war CONUS RBS and overseas sites (e.g., Korea). The last AN/MSQ-77 locations (e.g., at museums after c. 2000 retirements) included the Ellsworth Air Force Base Museum (near the Antelope Butte, Belle Fourche, Conner, & Horman RBS sites) and:

- Serial Number 1: ...
- Serial Number ? Detachment 7, !CEVG Ashland, Maine
- Serial number 7: Detachment 12, 1CEVG Hawthorne, Nevada from June 1982 until site decommissioning in August 1986 and relocation to Detachment 17, 1CEVG Havre, Montana. Upon decommissioning of Havre, MT Serial Number 7 went to Detachment 18, Forsyth, Montana for SAC Bomb-Comp 1987 and then to Detachment 20, 1CEVG Conrad, Montana in early 1988. Was later modified by replacing the Cassegrain antenna with a Fresnel lens antenna, as was used on the MSQ-46. After the antenna (and associated equipment) modification, S/N 7 was used by the HQ 1CEVG "Bug" team to validate new site locations.
- Serial number 10: Eighth Air Force Museum (Barksdale AFB) after use at Hawthorne Bomb Plot (c. 1987-2000), Guam, and Vietnam War OL 24 Served as "Secondary" radar at Mobile Duty Location (MDL) 35 Climax, KS from Jan - Jun 1982
- Serial Number 11: ...
- Serial Number 12: TBD after use at Nakhon Phanom RTAFB (NKP) Vietnam War OL-27 (BROMO), and initial testing at Bryan Field, Texas (1st AN/TSQ-81: variant of AN/MSQ-77)
- Serial Number 13: destroyed Lima Site 85 variant previously used at Vietnam War OL-23 and tested at Bryan Field
- Serial Number 21: Used as "Primary" radar at Mobile Duty Location (MDL) 35 Climax, KS from Jan - Jun 1982. MSQ-77 S/N 10 served as "Secondary" for the ORI/BUY NONE missions at MDL 35 during that timeframe.

== Equipment and functions ==
In addition to the communication and maintenance van, other AN/MSQ-77 trailers were the 33 ft (10 m) radar van with roof-mounted Cassegrain antenna, "control and plotting van, two diesel generator vans, [and] an administrative and supply van" which were emplaced as a military installation at the surveyed site. The primary modification for the AN/MSQ-77 was the control equipment for aircraft guidance (ballistic computer, guidance/release circuitry, and UHF command equipment). The central also had an added beacon tracking capability used when the aircraft had a receiver/transmitter (e.g., Motorola SST-181 X Band Beacon Transponder) to increase the range, so the radar site could be located farther from the hostile region of bombing targets. Beacon track upgrades included radar circuitry to switch the heterodyne receiver to demodulate the transponder frequency, compensation for the transponder delay, and modification of the central's plotting board circuitry to allow display for increased ranges. The plots were of tracks calculated by the computer's Aircraft Coordinates and Plotting Group which converted radar spherical data to plotting board cartesian coordinates (non-inertial east, north, up coordinate system) using sine/cosine voltages and radar-estimated range respectively from the Antenna Group (azimuth/elevation resolvers) and from the Track Range Computer. Additional A/C Coordinates amplifiers computed the velocity components (not plotted) which along with the track position components were provided as initial bomb conditions to the ballistic computer (Bomb Trajectory Group).

=== Bomb Trajectory Group ===
The Bomb Trajectory Group (BTG) was the AN/MSQ-77's analog ballistic computer using 3-dimensional double-integration to continually predict the bomb impact point from an aircraft track during a bomb run. The Cartesian aircraft data were propagated by the BTG mathematical modeling which included aerodynamics for different bombs, Earth "curvature and Coriolis corrections", and vacuum tube integrating amplifiers. The integration was based on the varying aircraft position and velocity prior to the bomb release, so as with the use of the Norden bombsight analog computer in World War II, a nearly steady bomb run was required for the AN/MSQ-77 to provide sufficient bombing accuracy. As in the 1950s Nike missile guidance system(s), electro-mechanical servos controlled sine/cosine resolvers in a feedback loop for computing the simulated bomb's horizontal velocity and along with the drop rate, the simulated bomb's airspeed and dive angle ("Pitch Servo"). Likewise, a "Z servo" allowed the Air Resistance Circuits to adjust for altitude-varying air density, and the drag aerodynamics were vectorized by a servo operating potentiometers to pick-off 3 bomb-specific deceleration voltages based on each cartesian velocity voltage.

=== Ground directed bombing ===
The AN/MSQ-77 radar track began after the aircraft (A/C) arrived near the Initial Point (IP) on a heading toward the target. When the computer's groundspeed and elevation rate servos had stabilized to the A/C cartesian velocity from the differentiating amplifiers, an operator placed the central into "computer track" to provide rate-aided tracking signals to the radar. With the computer track and the central having target position, A/C heading, & bomb type information; and with the Bomb Trajectory Group's servos tracking the bomb-in-aircraft course and pitch, the operator then activated the BTG integrators for the computer simulation to begin integrating a bomb trajectory from the A/C coordinates at that integration start point. Acceleration voltages from the BTG dynamic models were double-integrated by the 6 computer amplifiers which generated 3 voltages for the simulated bomb displacement (altitude, north, & east deltas) which were summed to the A/C position (simulated bomb release point, BRP). Use of the continually-changing current A/C position as the simulated BRP ensured a more accurate Earth Curvature Correction (ECC) was generated for the simulated bomb's horizontal range from the radar. When the simulated bomb's altitude (simulated BRP altitude - integrated altitude delta + altitude ECC) equalled the target height, the integration automatically stopped, and the integrated displacements were held as constant altitude, north, and east delta voltages. Subsequent summing of more current simulated bomb release points (A/C bomb run positions after the integration ended) with the integrator deltas generated a path of simulated bomb impact (SBI) points that moved relative to the A/C position throughout the remainder of the bomb run. The latest SBI was the AN/MSQ-77's best estimate of the impact position if bomb release was from the current A/C position:

The AN/MSQ-77 control algorithm continually commanded the A/C so the BTG simulated bomb impact point, which was plotted separately from the A/C track, would move toward the target. While the A/C was being guided, an AN/MSQ-77 bomb release algorithm used a model for the future path of simulated bomb impact points to predict the nearest impact to the target (a No-Go condition aborted before effecting an outlying bomb release). Instead of releasing from the A/C position corresponding to the nearest predicted impact point, the AN/MSQ-77 began the bomb release sequence just prior, which accounted for the delay in generating the radio command, in transmitting the command, and in the A/C effecting the mechanical release. The delay time was based on calibration testing of the AN/MSQ-77 with A/C bomb release circuitry (e.g., mean bomb release time for salvo drops from B-52s).

=== Accuracy ===
Although the 1967 Commando Club missions against North Vietnam by the 7th Air Force were temporarily suspended due to successful enemy defenses on November 18, the AN/MSQ-77 variant at LS-85 had effected a direct hit (zero miss distance) as well as a 5 mi (8.0 km) miss—its Commando Club CEP through November 16 for "14 runs was 867 feet". The suspension period for modifying attack tactics was used to reduce GDB errors of LS-85, since other Skyspot sites had been more accurate. AN/MSQ-77 errors included the typical automatic tracking radar errors such as the antenna lag due to the conical scan tracking, Track Range Computer error, any inaccuracy of the A/C transponder delay value used by the central, and the range offset of the A/C transponder antenna from the actual position of the bomb release point(s) on the A/C (particularly negligible when the radar was tracking from the side of the A/C). The AN/MSQ-77 compensation for antenna lag during rate-aided computer track used a telescopic CCTV system with operator's joystick to aim the antenna axis toward the A/C (e.g., bomb bay section of the fuselage). Additional AN/MSQ-77 errors were in the bomb trajectory algorithm (e.g., different simulation rates for each of 6 integrating amplifiers) and in the bomb release algorithm.

== See also ==
- List of radars
- List of military electronics of the United States
- Joint Electronics Type Designation System – Unclassified designation system for United States military electronic equipment
