= AN/TSQ-96 Bomb Directing Central =

Cold War-era US military computerized tracking radar

AN/TSQ-96

General information
- Type: military control system
- Location: Bergstrom Air Force Base, United States

The AN/TSQ-96 Bomb Directing Central, developed by Reeves Instrument Corporation, was an automatic tracking radar/computer/communications system ("Q" system). The United States Air Force used it from the 1960s, including during the Vietnam War.

In accordance with the Joint Electronics Type Designation System (JETDS), the "AN/TSQ-96" designation represents the 96th design of an Army-Navy electronic device for ground transportable special combination equipment. The JETDS system also now is used to name all Department of Defense electronic systems.

== Description ==
The AN/TSQ-96 operated in India Band monopulse variant of the conical scan Reeves AN/MSQ-77 Bomb Directing Central and had a solid state Univac 1219B computer with punch tape reader (Mark 152 fire control computer), for ballistic calculation. As with the MSQ-77, an analog vacuum tube computer converted radar range, azimuth, and elevation to cartesian coordinates, but the TSQ-96 used a digital radiometer for analog-to-digital conversion. The TSQ-96 systems manufactured by Reeves Instrument Corporation were replaced c. 1990 by the US Dynamics AN/TPQ-43 Radar Bomb Scoring Set ("Seek Score").

== Sites ==
An AN/TSQ-96 was used for Vietnam War ground-directed bombing training at Bergstrom AFB in Austin TX and tracked flights at the Matagorda Island General Bombing and Gunnery Range. Deployment of the central began at operating location 23 (OL-23) on Nakhon Phanom (NKP) RTAFB during the Vietnam War and in 1983, Radar Bomb Scoring Division Detachment 24 operated a TSQ-96 for Radar Bomb Scoring in Guam. Detachment 1, 1 CEVG La Junta, CO also used a TSQ-96. This radar was the one at Keesler AFB and previously Bergstrom AFB. The set was packed up at Keesler AFB, Biloxi, MS by personnel from Detachment 8, 1 CEVG Richmond, KY and shipped to Detachment 1. Detachment 12, 1CEVG Hawthorne, NV had a TSQ-96 that had been transferred from Detachment 6, 1 CEVG Bayshore, MI.

== See also ==
- List of military electronics of the United States
