= Route Package =

Areas of US operations over North Vietnam

- Area of operation
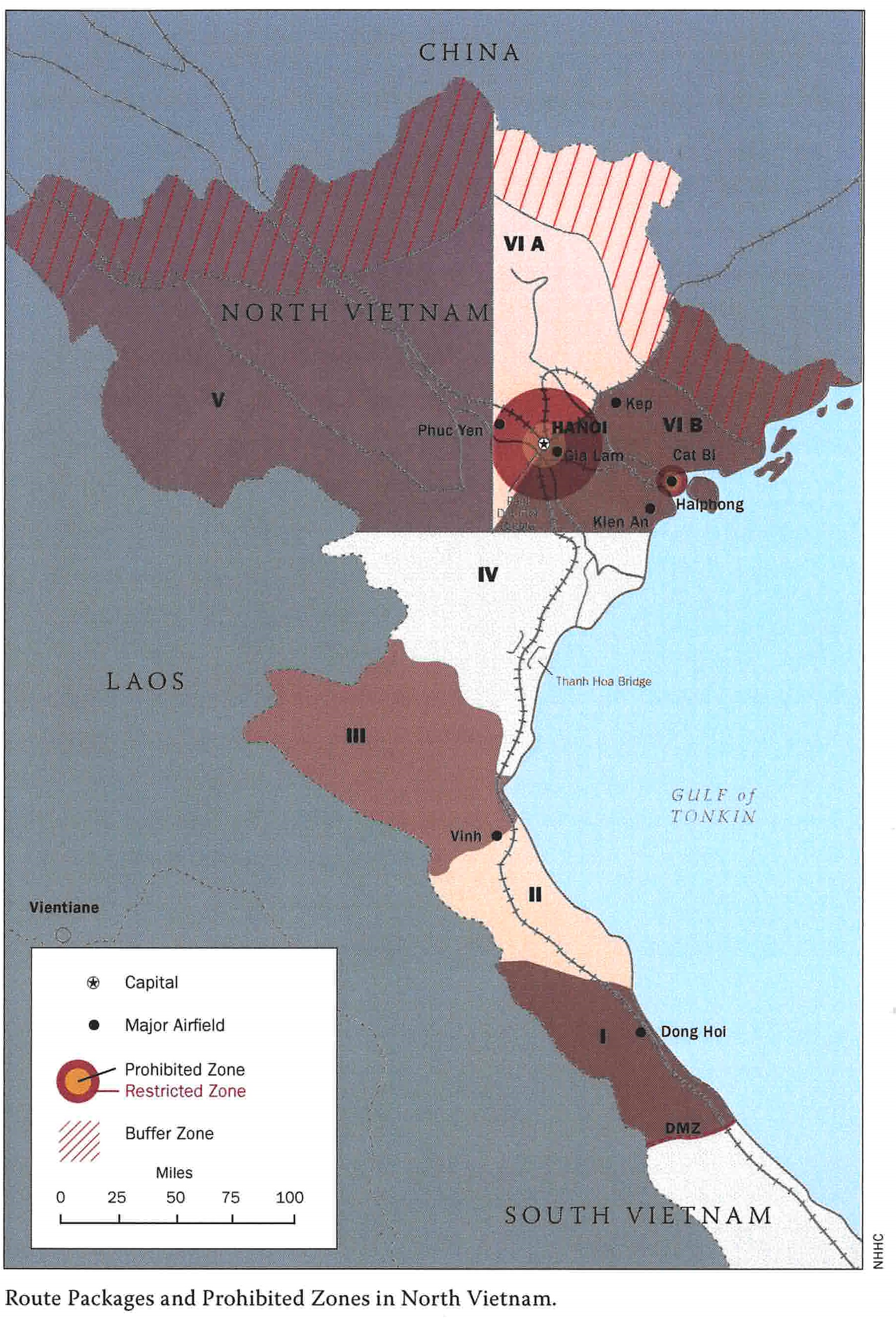
- Location: North Vietnam

A Route Package were the names given by the US Air Force and US Navy to describe areas of air operations over North Vietnam. Generally referred to as "Route Pack" or even just "Pac" or "RP", each of the seven numbered areas represented a specific area of the country. Route Pack 1 was in the southernmost extremes of the country, on the border with South Vietnam. Route Pack 6, or 6B specifically, referred to the area around Hanoi and was considered to be the best defended airspace in the world at that time, and home to the dreaded Thud Ridge.

== History ==
Early during the Vietnam War, the Air Force and the Navy found it difficult to conduct joint operations, and instead competed for resources and targets. As a result, an Air Force-Navy coordinating team met in December 1965 and divided North Vietnam into six sectors. The zones were given the name "Route Packages" and were designated as 1, 2, 3, 4, 5, and 6. In April 1966, Admiral U. S. Grant Sharp, Jr., commander in chief of United States Pacific Command, added a seventh area by dividing RP 6 into two sections, 6A and 6B. The Navy's Carrier Task Force 77 handled operations in RPs 2, 3, 4, and 6B, as these bordered on the Gulf of Tonkin. The Air Force was given RP 1, RP 5, and 6A.

RP6 was considered the most dangerous airspace in the world. It covered both Hanoi and Haiphong, and therefore covered the vast majority of strategic targets in the country. When the air war started, the entire North Vietnamese air defence system contained twenty-two early warning radars, four fire-control radars, and 700 anti-aircraft guns. By 1967, North Vietnam was firing 25,000 tons of anti-aircraft ammunition a month. When President Johnson halted Rolling Thunder on 1 November 1968, this had grown to 400 radar sites, 8,050 anti-aircraft guns, 150 fighters (including reserves based in China), and 40 SA-2 Guideline missile sites. The bombing halt allowed the defenders to rationalize and improve their system, which eventually included 200 SA-2 sites around the country and along the Ho Chi Minh trail.

== Sources ==
- Boyne, Walter (November 1999), "Route Pack 6", Air Force Magazine
- White, Douglas M (2014), Rolling Thunder to Linebacker: U.S. Fixed wing survivability over North Vietnam (PDF), OCLC 913595068
