= Muang Phalan TACAN Site =

Former United States Air Force facility in Laos

Site information
- Type: Air Force
- Condition: abandoned

Location
- Coordinates: 16.658°N 105.561°E

Site history
- Built: 1967
- In use: 1967
- Battles/wars: Vietnam War

Garrison information
- Occupants: 1st Mobile Communications Group

Muang Phalan TACAN Site (also known as Lima 61 Alternative or L-61A) was a U.S. Air Force facility built in the village of Muang Phalan, Laos, during the Vietnam War.

== History ==
Muang Phalan TACAN Site was established by the U.S. Air Force in April 1967 as part of Operation Bright Light to create a network of TACAN sites to support air operations over southern Laos and Vietnam. The site operated as TACAN Channel 77.

On 25 December 1967 the site was attacked by the People's Army of Vietnam who overran the facility killing the two "sheep-dipped" technicians from the 1st Mobile Communications Group. A replacement TACAN site was installed at Mukdahan, Thailand.

== Current use ==
The site is abandoned and turned over to farmland and housing.

== See also ==
- Lima Site 85
