= McClellan AFB Annex =

Coordinates: 38.605201°N 121.425018°W

McClellan Air Force Base Annex #1 ("McClellan Anx #1") was a military installation near McClellan Air Force Base in Sacramento County, California, that was active from 28 November 1951 to 2 July 1956. Strategic Air Command operated an automatic tracking radar station (call sign "Sacramento Bomb Plot") just outside the base at Whitney and Eastern Avenues.

== History ==
Colorado Spring's 206th Army Air Force Base Unit, following the Second World War in 1946, had Radar Bomb Scoring detachments in Kansas City and Dallas. RBS Detachment D moved to near McClellan AFB, from Fort George Wright, Spokane, Washington, around September 1951, and was renamed to become Detachment 12 of the 3903rd Radar Bomb Scoring Squadron. The base was deactivated on 2 July 1956.
