= 3903rd Radar Bomb Scoring Group =

United States military evaluation unit

The 3903rd Radar Bomb Scoring Group was a military evaluation unit under direct command of Strategic Air Command (SAC) headquarters for scoring simulated bomb runs using automatic tracking radar stations. Initially an Army Air Forces Base Unit (AAFBU) and then a squadron, the 3903rd RBS Group was personnel, assets, and detachments were redesignated the 1st Radar Bomb Scoring Group and then the 1CEVG Radar Bomb Scoring Division when the RBS Group merged with the 3908th Strategic Standardization Group in 1961, the year RBS Express trains began to be used for low-altitude Boeing B-52 Stratofortress operations.

== Background ==
Automatic tracking radars were used for World War II ground-directed bombing, and at the end of the war SCR-584 tracking radars with OA-294 plotting equipment which recorded the aircraft path during a bomb run, allowing the bomb release point and velocity to be assessed for Radar Bomb Scoring. In 1945, an RBS site was in New Orleans on Marconi Dr, and the 206th Army Air Force Base Unit (RBS) was organized on 6 June 1945 at "Colorado Springs" (tent camp) and controlled RBS detachments at Kansas City and Dallas Love Field, Texas. "On 24 July 1945, the 206th was redesignated the 63rd AAFBU (RBS) and three weeks later was moved to Mitchel Field, New York, and placed under the command of the Continental Air Force." "On 5 March 1946, the organization moved back to Colorado Springs and on 8 March of the same year was redesignated the 263rd AAFBU."

=== Andrews Field ===
On 17 March 1946 the "263 AAF BU" was assigned to the Continental Air Forces' Andrews Field, and after Fifteenth Air Force transferred to SAC on 31 March 1946, the 263rd subsequently transferred from 15AF to directly under Strategic Air Command. RBS scored 888 simulated bomb runs against San Diego in 1946 and in 1947, the USAF was established and MacDill Field, Florida, had an RBS detachment (the 263rd was renamed the 263rd Air Force Base Unit.) The 263 AF BU scored 2,499 runs in 1947 and its last day at Andrews Air Force Base was 23 February 1948.

=== Carswell AFB ===
The 3903rd Radar Bomb Scoring Squadron was designated from the 263rd AAFBU on 24 February 1948, the first day the unit was at Carswell AFB (which acquired "Midland Bombing Rg #14" and ...#21 on 1 Mar.) In 1948, Detachment B was operating an RBS site at Treasure Island, California, and SAC scored 12,084 bomb runs in 1948. By 14 September 1949, the 3903rd RBSS controlled the "Denver Bomb Plot" RBS detachment. (Detachment A)

Three of the squadron's detachments (C, K, & N) arrived at Pusan, South Korea, in September 1950 for close air support (Det N, code named HILLBILLY, bombed itself because by mistakenly using a new system with procedures for a preceding system.) During the war the 3903rd's detachments were redesignated from letters to numbers, e.g., 3903rd Detachment B became Detachment 13, Det D in 1950 at Fort George Wright, Washington, became Det 12 (near McClellan AFB by the end of 1951), and Det N deployed in Korea became Detachment 22. The 3 ground-directed bombing detachments in Korea were "out 2 October 1951" when their mobile radar stations transferred to the 502nd Tactical Control Group.

1951 RBS squadrons
On 16 October 1951, the west coast's 3933rd Radar Bomb Scoring Squadron (3933rd RBSS) was activated at Mather Air Force Base, the 3922nd Radar Bomb Scoring Squadron was activated at Carswell AFB, and the 3944th Radar Bomb Scoring Squadron was activated at Turner AFB, Georgia.

== 3903rd RBS Group ==
The 3903rd Radar Bomb Scoring Group was established by 12 August 1952 using the number of the 3903rd RBS Squadron at Carswell AFB, but with the headquarters of the 3933rd RBSS at March Air Force Base "sent to Carswell to Headquarter 3903rd RBS Group". Circa 1952 at Carswell, the 3903rd conducted SAC's 2-week course "for those going out to detachments" after they had completed the longer initial radar course at Keesler AFB. 3903rd group commanders included Major Templeton and in 1953, Detachment 6 was at Dallas. The group had transferred to Texas (Carsewell) by 10 August 1954 when "Inactivated & Discontinued.

When the 3903rd RBS Group personnel and stations were redesignated the 1st Radar Bomb Scoring Group on 10 August 1954, the RBS squadrons were renamed, e.g., the detachment near McClellan AFB became Det 4 of the 11th Radar Bomb Scoring Squadron activated at March Air Force Base on 10 August 1954 (the 10th RBSS activated at Carswell AFB on 10 August 1954.)

== Site locations ==
Strategic Air Command RBS detachments/stations
Det	bomb plot	#	1951 (Sept grp)	Sq:#	1954 (Aug sqs)
A	CO: Denver	1	CO: Denver	11th:1 10th:1 12th:1	CO: Denver; TX: Dallas Montreal
H		8	CA: Los Angeles	11th:2	CA: Los Angeles
B	CA: Treasure Island (FL: Eglin AFB-TDY)	13	CA: Treasure Island		
C	tbd ↪Korea	16	NC: Charlotte (2nd site)*	10th:3 12th:3	NE: Omaha; NC: Charlotte
D	WA: Spokane (1st site)* ↪CA: Sacramento	12	CA: Sacramento	11th:4 12th:4 12th:5	CA: Sacramento; GA: Atlanta; FL: Tampa
I	CA: Stockton ⤷NC: Charlotte (1st site)* ⤷TX: Houston	6	TX: Houston	10th:6	TX: Houston
		23	Heston Aerodrome	12th:7 12th:8 12th:9	London KY: Lexington; OH: Columbus
J				10th:10 12th:10	ND: Bismarck; KY: Richmond
K	tbd ↪Korea	5	Korea	12th:11 12th:12	NY: Watertown tbd
L	AZ: Phoenix		AZ: Phoenix	11th:3	AZ: Phoenix
N	Korea (Hillbilly)**	22	Korean War		
*After Charlotte and Spokane dets moved, other dets opened later sites for those cities. **Det N formed at Carswell AFB to establish RBS in Puerto Rico but instead deployed to Pusan, South Korea, after "final preparations" at Camp Stoneman, California.
