= 1st Combat Evaluation Group =

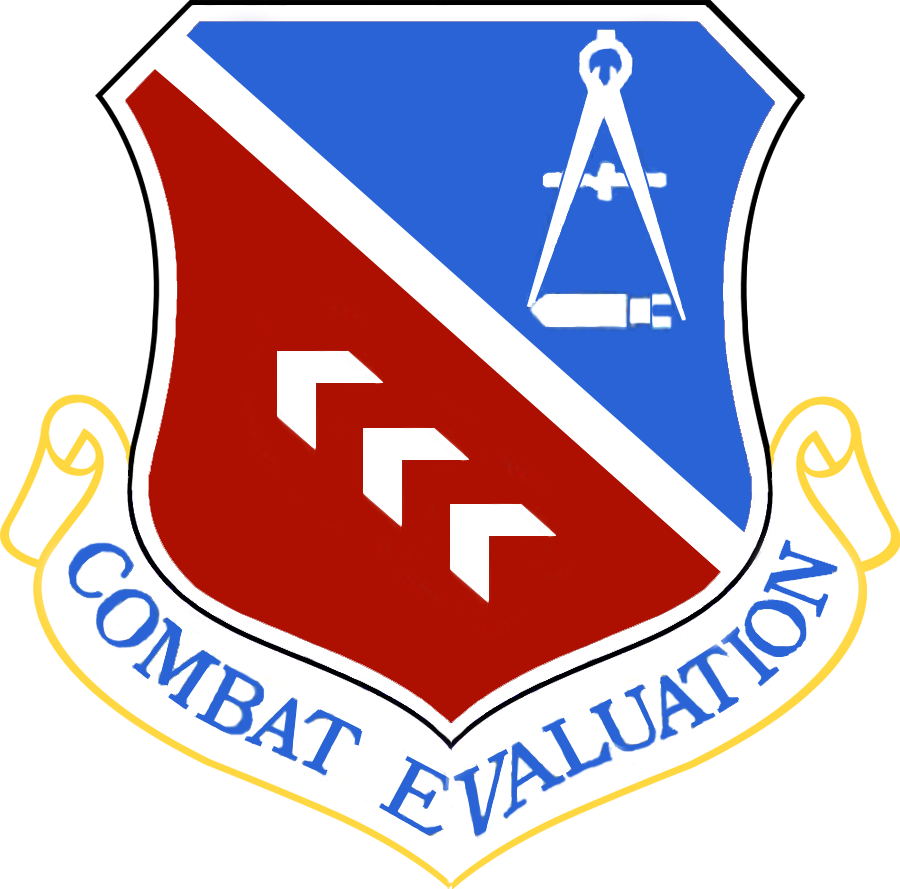
- 1st Combat Evaluation Group insignia
- Active: 1961–1989
- Country: United States
- Branch: United States Air Force
- Role: Standardization & evaluation
- Part of: Strategic Air Command HQ
- Garrison/HQ: Barksdale Air Force Base, Louisiana
- Engagements: Battle of Lima Site 85

The 1st Combat Evaluation Group (initially "1CEG", later "1CEVG") was a Strategic Air Command (SAC) unit. It was formed on 1 August 1961 to merge the 3908th Strategic Standardization Group for SAC aircrew evaluation with the 1st Radar Bomb Scoring Group that had originated from the 263rd Army Air Force Base Unit which transferred from 15th AF to directly under Strategic Air Command c. 1946. The 1CEVG formed after SAC switched to low-level tactics to counter Soviet surface-to-air missiles ("Oil Burner" training routes in 1959) and SAC had "developed a Radar Bomb Scoring field kit for use in NIKE Systems" in early 1960 for scoring SAC training missions against US Hercules SAM sites. The 1CEVG headquarters included an Office of History and a "standardization and evaluation school" for command examiners.

== Standardization and evaluation ==
The 1CEVG deputy commander for standardization and evaluation was responsible for performance assessment of SAC tanker and bomber flight crews. 1CEVG also evaluated the RC-135 units at Eielson, Kadena, and Offutt, the flight crew standardization of the U-2, the DC-130 reconnaissance drone program, CH-3 helicopter drone recovery program, [and] the SR-71 program at Beale AFB.

The Fairchild Trophy was Strategic Air Command's top Bombardment Award, for which the Group administered flight checks and evaluated standardization and training activities.

== Divisions ==
1CEVG included a Command Instrument Flight Division and an RBS Division with 3 squadrons.

== Radar Bomb Scoring Division ==
The Radar Bomb Scoring Division controlled the group's Radar Bomb Scoring units. As with the preceding 1st Radar Bomb Scoring Group at Carswell AFB, the division had 3 Radar Bomb Scoring Squadrons (10th, 11th, 12th) with RBS detachments at fixed radar stations and at semi-mobile radar stations (Mobile Duty Locations (MDLs)). The MDLs were set up for SAC special missions, with their equipment, trailers, books, etc., stored at Barksdale AFB when not in use. Each squadron manned an RBS Express train, but the squadrons were inactivated in 1966 after Vietnam War deployments had begun. The three squadrons in 1959 had 29 AUTOTRACK sites. 1CEVG temporary duty personnel at Nike Defense Areas also scored mock SAC raids tracked by the Army.

RBS trains were inactivated later in the war after the 1968-9 Project 693 discharging 1st term SAC airmen up to 11 months early. The division included a maintenance office. After the Vietnam War ended, the annual Combat Skyspot trophy was awarded for the outstanding RBS detachment (e.g., Louis Blotner Radar Bomb Scoring Site (Ashland Det 7) in 1985).

The squadrons initially used Matador Automatic Radar Control (AN/MSQ-1) and AN/MSQ-2 automatic tracking radar/computer systems. The Reeves AN/MSQ-35 Bomb Scoring Central was developed for the division (mid-1963 testing was at the White Sands Missile Range.) During the Vietnam War, the Statesboro Bomb Scoring Site used a Soviet T2A for training crews to jam the signal. Three US bombing systems developed during the war (AN/MSQ-77, AN/TSQ-81, & AN/TSQ-96) were used post-war in the United States by the RBS Division, which replaced them with the c. 1980 solid-state US Dynamics AN/TPQ-43 Bomb Scoring Set (SEEK SCORE) developed from the AN/TPB-1C Course Directing Central.

The Electronic Systems Division 806L "Range Threat" systems for electronic warfare simulation were developed for use by 1CEVG late in the Cold War. Such systems included the US Dynamics AN/MST-T1 Miniature-Multiple Threat Emitter Simulator (MUTES), for which the group evaluated the prototype in 1977 (operational in October 1978). Similarly, TLQ-11 jammer improvements were in 1978, and in 1979 1CEVG members completed a prototype study and testing of the new Threat Reaction Analysis Indicator System (TRAINS) for analyzing how aircrews and avionics reacted to ground-based threats.

At the end of the Cold War, most RBS detachments were closed. The personnel and the assets of the RBS Division became the 1st Electronic Combat Range Group on 1 July 1989 when the 1CEVG was split, and other 1CEVG organizations transferred to SAC headquarters.

=== Stations ===
1CEVG radar stations before/after squadron closures on 25 July (12th), 22 August (11th), & 19 September (10th) 1965
Det	10th RBS	11th RBS	12th RBS	20 September 1966	31 June 1989
1	CO: La Junta		Montreal, Canada	CO: La Junta (1959–1995)	
2	MO: Joplin (tbd-1969)	SD: Badlands		SD: Badlands (1960–1968)	AZ: Holbrook AFS (1968–1993)
3			NC: Charlotte	GA: Statesboro	
4		CA:Sacramento	GA: Statesboro	MO: Oronogo	Bann, West Germany (1970-c. 1985)
5			FL: Tampa	ID: Wilder (1963–1994)	
6				MI: Bayshore (1963-1985)	
7			London, England	ME: Ashland Strategic Training Range (1963–90)	
8			KY: Richmond	KY: Richmond	
9		AZ: Winslow	OH: Springfield	UT: St. George (July 1966 from Winslow-tbd)	
10	NE: Hastings	ND: Bismarck	KY: Blue Grass AD	NE: Hastings	
11			NY: Fort Drum	NY: Ft Drum	
12			MS: Laurel	NV: Hawthorne	
13				MS: Ellisville	
14	Det 14, Bismarck, ND			ND: Bismarck (1961-1986)	
15	[most of the above deployed for Vietnam Combat Skyspot]			Tan Son Nhut AB, Vietnam	
16					WY: Powell
17					MT: Havre (1986-c. 1993)
18					MT: Forsyth (c. 1986–c. 1996)
19					ND: Dickinson
20					MT: Conrad
21					SD: Belle Fourche

== Detachments 7 & 50 ==
Detachment 7, 1 CEVG was a Matagorda Island Air Force Base radar site for the "Busy Skyspot" training program for automatic tracking radar crews to use the Reeves AN/MSQ-77 Bomb Directing Central before transferring to Vietnam War operating locations. A CONUS AN/MSQ-77 had initially been used at the mountainous Nellis Air Force Range before being moved to the Gulf Coast of the United States, then the detachment moved to Bergstrom Air Force Base and was redesignated Det 50 for long range tracking of bombers on 2 Matagorda Island Air Force Range routes (low- and high-level). On 29 February 1968, on the low-level Matagorda route a Boeing B-52 Stratofortress crashed into the Gulf of Mexico.

== Detachment 15 ==
Detachment 15, 1CEVG at the Vietnam War's Tan Son Nhut Air Base served as an "administrative link between [the operating locations] and Headquarters 1st Combat Evaluation Group" after Reeves AN/MSQ-77 Bomb Directing Centrals were produced and deployed in 1965 for Combat Skyspot bomber operations by tactical fighter, B-52, and other units. On 5 June 1966 near Đông Hà Combat Base close to the DMZ, six 1CEVG technicians were killed while conducting a preliminary site location survey.

== Lineage ==
Constituted as the 3903d Radar Bomb Scoring Group from the 3903d RBS Squadron (at Carswell AFB beginning 24 Feb 48) and predecessor 263rd AAF Base Unit
Redesignated 1st Radar Bomb Scoring Group on 10 August 1954
Merged with the 3958 Opl Evaluation & Tng Gp for the B-58 on 15 Mar 60
Redesignated 1st Combat Evaluation Group at Carswell AFB prior to 21 July 1961 for the merger of the Barksdale AFB 3908th Strategic Standardization Group and 1st RBS Group
Redesignated 1st Electronic Combat Range Group on 1 July 1989 from the assets and personnel of the Radar Bomb Scoring Division, 1CEVG

=== Squadrons ===
- 10th Radar Bomb Scoring Squadron, 10 August 1954 – 19 September 1966
- 11th Radar Bomb Scoring Squadron, 10 August 1954 – 22 August 1966, March AFB, California
- 12th Radar Bomb Scoring Squadron, 10 August 1954 – 25 July 1966, Turner AFB, Georgia
- 13th Radar Bomb Scoring Squadron, 10 August 1954 – unknown, Ellisville, MS

== Commanders ==
- Col. Joseph D. White, 1 Aug 1961 – 20 May 1964
- Col. Melvin R. Schultz, 20 May 1964 – 16 May 1966
- Col. Jacob A. Hutchison, 16 May 1966 – 1 Feb 1970
- Col. Willie H. Sontag, 1 Feb 1970 – 1 Jul 1971
- Col. Alvin E. Prothero, 1 Jul 1971 – 25 Apr 1975
- Col. Edward F. Gehrke, 25 Apr 1975 – 27 Oct 1978
- Col. Robert F. Ramsey, 27 Oct 1978 – 1 Dec 1979
- Col. Larry S. DeVall, 1 Dec 1979 - 16 Sept 1981
- Col. John R. Rader, 16 Sept 1981 - 28 Jul 1983
- Col. Billy F. Price, 28 Jul 1983 – 15 Jan 1988
- Col. John C. Dalton, 16 Jan 1988 – 23 Jan 1989
- Col. Joseph M. Hudson, Jr., 23 Jan 1989 – ?
