= Louis Blotner Radar Bomb Scoring Site =

- Loring Air Force Base, Aroostook, Maine

Site information
- Type: military radar station

Location
- Coordinates: 47°00′30″N 68°01′07″W
- Area: 6.59 acres (2.67 ha)

The Louis Blotner Radar Site was a tracking site (Not an RBS site) in Connor, Maine at the former NIKE missile launch site. Activated in June 1963 and operational until after 1979, The Ashland site was an AUTOTRACK radar site operated by Detachment 7 of the 1st Combat Evaluation Group. The station simulated Electronic Countermeasures and Radar Bomb Scoring for the Ashland Training Range's low-level training route "over Bangor north to Houlton, Maine."

== History ==
The site was constructed at a former 1957 NIKE battery control area (radar site) which, had been conveyed to Blotner Trailer Sales in 1962, the SAC radar station was initially a mobile site with temporarily emplaced systems. In 1975, the site was planned to become permanent, but instead groundbreaking in June 1979 was for the nearby Ashland Radar Station. The "Blotner Site" was subsequently used for Louis Blotner Communications Facility No. 1 of Det 2, 1000 SOG in 1987-1993, and the enlisted men's barracks operated as a general store in August 1992. In 1996 the former Ashland site was planned for civilian transfer.
