= Strategic Air Command =

1946–1992 US Air Force major command

- Shield of Strategic Air Command
- Active: 1947–1992: US Air Force; 1946–1947: US Army Air Forces
- Country: United States
- Branch: United States Air Force
- Type: Major Command / Specified Command
- Garrison/HQ: 9 November 1948: Offutt Air Force Base, Nebraska; 21 October 1946: Andrews Field, Maryland; 21 March 1946: Bolling Field, District of Columbia
- Motto: "Peace is Our Profession"
- March: "Strategic Air Command March"

Commanders
- Notable commanders: Gen Curtis LeMay; Gen John Dale Ryan

Insignia
- Shield (subdued)

Strategic Air Command (SAC) was a Cold War-era United States Department of Defense Specified Command and a United States Air Force (USAF) Major Command (MAJCOM) responsible for command and control of the strategic bomber and intercontinental ballistic missile (ICBM) components of the United States military's strategic nuclear forces from 1946 to 1992, active for most of the Cold War. SAC was also responsible for strategic reconnaissance aircraft; airborne command posts; and most of the USAF's aerial refueling aircraft.

SAC primarily consisted of the Second Air Force (2AF), Eighth Air Force (8AF) and the Fifteenth Air Force (15AF), while SAC headquarters (HQ SAC) included Directorates for Operations & Plans, Intelligence, Command & Control, Maintenance, Training, Communications, and Personnel. At a lower echelon, SAC headquarters divisions included Aircraft Engineering, Missile Concept, and Strategic Communications. At the height of the Cold War in 1983, SAC controlled a total of 37 different wings. It operated 1,000 Minuteman II and III ICBMs, 48 LGM-25C Titan II ICBMs, 316 B-52 Stratofortress strategic bombers, 56 FB-111 Aardvark fighter-bombers. Supporting these, SAC operated 615 KC-135 Stratotanker refuelers, alongside 14 EC-135 'Looking Glass' and several E-4 'Nightwatch' command and control aircraft, the latter of which supported continuity of government. Reconnaissance aircraft included the SR-71 Blackbird, U-2 'Dragon Lady', and RC-135.

In 1992, as part of an overall post-Cold War reorganization of the U.S. Air Force, SAC was disestablished as both a Specified Command and as a MAJCOM. Its personnel and equipment redistributed among the Air Combat Command (ACC), Air Mobility Command (AMC), Pacific Air Forces (PACAF), United States Air Forces in Europe (USAFE), and Air Education and Training Command (AETC), while SAC's central headquarters complex at Offutt AFB, Nebraska was concurrently transferred to the newly created United States Strategic Command (USSTRATCOM), which was established as a joint Unified Combatant Command to replace SAC's Specified Command role. In 2009, SAC was reactivated and redesignated as the Air Force Global Strike Command (AFGSC). AFGSC eventually acquired all USAF bomber aircraft and the ICBM force, inheriting the role of its predecessor.

== Background ==
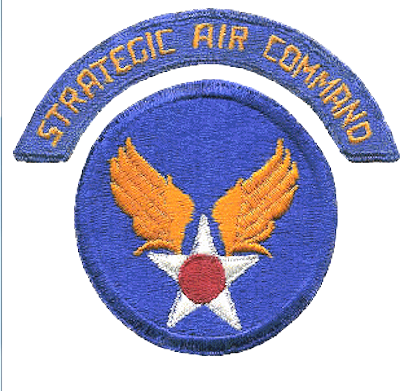
The 1946–1951 SAC patch (above) was replaced by the patch with insignia that won a SAC contest.

The Strategic Air Forces of the United States during World War II included General Carl Spaatz's European command, United States Strategic Air Forces in Europe (USSTAF), consisting of the 8AF and 15AF, and the United States Strategic Air Forces in the Pacific (USASTAF) and its Twentieth Air Force (20AF).

The U.S. Army Air Forces' first mission in the Strategic Bombing Campaign in the European Theater during World War II included the VIII Bomber Command, which conducted the first European "heavy bomber" attack by the USAAF on 17 August 1942; the Ninth Air Force, which conducted the first Operation Crossbow "No-Ball" missions on 5 December 1943; the Twelfth Air Force; and the Fifteenth Air Force, which executed bombing operations on 2 November 1943 during Operation Pointblank.

The Operation Overlord air plan for the strategic bombing of both Germany and German military forces in continental Europe prior to the 1944 invasion of France used several Air Forces, primarily those of the USAAF and those of the Royal Air Force (RAF), with the command of air operations transferring to the Supreme Commander of the Allied Expeditionary Force on 14 April 1944.

Planning to reorganize for a separate and independent postwar U.S. Air Force had begun by the fall of 1945, with the Simpson Board tasked to plan, "...the reorganization of the Army and the Air Force...". In January 1946, Generals Eisenhower and Spaatz agreed on an Air Force organization composed of the Strategic Air Command, the Air Defense Command, the Tactical Air Command, the Air Transport Command and the supporting Air Technical Service Command, Air Training Command, the Air University, and the Air Force Center.

== Establishment and transfer to USAF ==
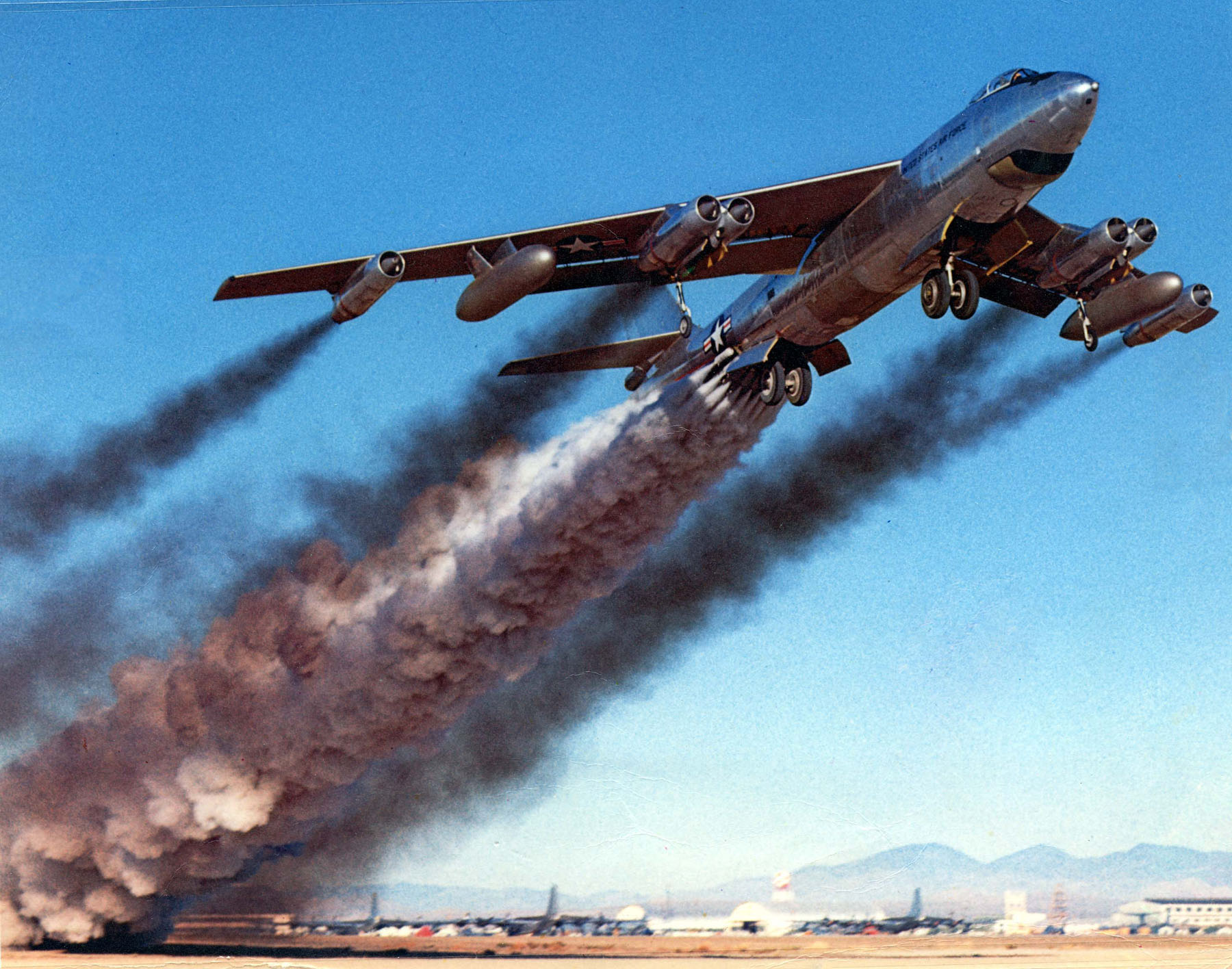
Boeing B-47B Stratojet executing a rocket-assisted take off (RATO) on 15 April 1954

Strategic Air Command was originally established in the U.S. Army Air Forces on 21 March 1946 upon the redesignation of Continental Air Forces (CAF), the World War II command tasked with the air defense of the continental United States (CONUS). At the time, CAF headquarters was located at Bolling Field (later Bolling AFB) in the District of Columbia and SAC assumed occupancy of its headquarters facilities until relocating SAC headquarters (HQ SAC) to nearby Andrews Field (later Andrews AFB), Maryland as a tenant activity until assuming control of Andrews Field in October 1946.

SAC initially totaled 37,000 USAAF personnel. In addition to Bolling Field and, seven months later, Andrews Field, SAC also assumed responsibility for:

- Roswell AAF, New Mexico (later renamed Roswell AFB, then Walker AFB), then home of the USAAF's sole nuclear-capable bomb wing, and
- Smoky Hill AAF, Kansas (later renamed Smoky Hill AFB, then Schilling AFB)

SAC also had seven additional CAF bases transferred on 21 March 1946 which remained in SAC through the 1947 establishment of the U.S. Air Force as an independent service. Those installations included:

- Castle Field, California (later Castle Air Force Base)
- Clovis AAF, New Mexico (later Cannon Air Force Base)
- Fort Worth AAF, Texas (later Carswell Air Force Base)
- Davis-Monthan Field, Arizona (later Davis-Monthan Air Force Base)
- Rapid City AAF, South Dakota (later Ellsworth Air Force Base)
- MacDill Field, Florida (later MacDill Air Force Base)
- Mountain Home AAF, Idaho (later Mountain Home Air Force Base)

On 31 March 1946, the following additional installation was also assigned to SAC:

- Kirtland Field, New Mexico (later Kirtland Air Force Base)

Under the first SAC Commander in Chief, General George C. Kenney, initial units reporting to the Strategic Air Command headquarters on 21 March 1946 included the Second Air Force, the IX Troop Carrier Command and the 73d Air Division.

Fifteenth Air Force was assigned to SAC on 31 March (15th AF's 263rd Army Air Force Base Unit—with SAC's radar detachments—transferred the same date directly under HQ SAC), while the IX Troop Carrier Command was inactivated the same date and its assets redistributed within SAC. With postwar demobilization still underway, eight of the ten assigned bomb groups were inactivated before the Eighth Air Force was assigned to SAC on 7 June 1946. Despite the pressures of demobilization, SAC continued the training and evaluation of bomber crews and units still on active duty in the postwar Army Air Forces. Radar Bomb Scoring became the preferred method of evaluating bomber crews, with the last of 888 simulated bomb runs scored against a bombing site near San Diego, California during 1946, subsequently increasing to 2,449 bomb runs by 1947. In the wake of the successful employment of air-dropped nuclear weapons against Hiroshima and Nagasaki, SAC became the focus of the nation's nuclear strike capability, to the extent that Joint Chiefs of Staff (JCS) Publication 1259/27 on 12 December 1946 identified that, "...the 'air atomic' strategic air force should only come under the orders of the JCS."

In addition to the strategic bombing mission, SAC also devoted significant resources to aerial reconnaissance. In 1946, SAC's reconnaissance aircraft inventory consisted of F-2 photo variants of the C-45 Expeditor support aircraft, but by 1947 SAC had acquired an F-9C squadron consisting of twelve photo-reconnaissance variants of the B-17G Flying Fortress. An F-13 squadron, the F-13 later re-designated as the RB-29 Superfortress, was also established. SAC conducted routine aerial reconnaissance missions near the Soviet borders or near the 12-mile international waters limit, although some missions actually penetrated into Soviet airspace. The flight profiles of these missions—above 30,000 feet and in excess of 300 knots—made interception by Soviet air forces difficult until the Soviet's 1948 introduction of the MiG-15 jet fighter. Project Nanook, the Cold War's first Top Secret reconnaissance effort, used the first RB-29 missions for mapping and visual reconnaissance in the Arctic and along the northern Soviet coast. Later missions were Project LEOPARD along the Chukchi Peninsula, followed by Projects RICKRACK, STONEWORK, and COVERALLS.

"USAF Atomic Bomb Delivery Aircraft" (1952).

In 1946, the US possessed only nine atomic bombs and twenty-seven B-29s capable at any one time of delivering them. Furthermore, it was later determined that an attack by the 509th Composite Bomb Group during the 1947 to 1948 time frame would have required at least five to six days just to transfer custody of the bombs from United States Atomic Energy Commission (AEC) sites to SAC and deploy the aircraft and weapons to forward operating bases before launching nuclear strikes. Postwar budget and personnel cuts had an insidious effect on SAC as its Deputy Commander, Major General Clements McMullen, implemented mandated force reductions. This continued to wear down SAC as a command and morale plummeted. As a result, by the end of 1947, only two of SAC's eleven groups were combat ready. After the 1948 Bikini Atoll nuclear tests, the "Half Moon" Joint Emergency War Plan developed in May 1948 proposed dropping 50 atomic bombs on twenty Soviet cities, with President Harry S. Truman approving "Half Moon" during the June 1948 Berlin Blockade, (Truman sent B-29s to Europe in July). SAC also ordered special ELINT RB-29s to detect improved Soviet radars and, in cooperation with the 51st Air Force Base Unit, SAC also monitored radioactive fallout from Soviet atomic testing on Novaya Zemlya.

In terms of overall Air Force basing and infrastructure, SAC continued to acquire an ever-increasing share of USAF infrastructure and the USAF associated budget. In 1947, before the USAF was established as an independent service, construction commenced on Limestone AAF, Maine (later renamed Loring AFB), a new SAC installation specifically designed to accommodate the B-36 Peacemaker. Fort Dix AAF, New Jersey (later McGuire AFB); Spokane AAF, Washington (later Fairchild AFB); and Wendover Field, Utah (later Wendover AFB) were also transferred to SAC between 30 April and 1 September 1947. Following the establishment of the USAF as a separate service, SAC bases in the United States consisted of:

- Castle Air Force Base, California
- Patrick Air Force Base, Florida
- Cannon Air Force Base, New Mexico
- Carswell Air Force Base, Texas
- Davis-Monthan Air Force Base, Arizona
- Ellsworth Air Force Base, South Dakota
- MacDill Air Force Base, Florida
- Mountain Home Air Force Base, Idaho
- Kirtland Air Force Base, New Mexico
- Loring Air Force Base, Maine
- McGuire Air Force Base, New Jersey
- Fairchild Air Force Base, Washington
- Wendover Air Force Base, Utah

Those bases subsequently added to SAC in the United States included:

- 1 July 1948: Topeka Air Force Base, Kansas (later Forbes Air Force Base)
- 1 October 1948: Offutt Air Force Base, Nebraska
- 1 October 1948: Biggs Air Force Base, Texas
- 1 July 1947: Castle Air Force Base, California
- 21 March 1949: Bergstrom Air Force Base, Texas
- 1 May 1949: March Air Force Base, California
- 1 May 1949: Fairfield-Suisun AFB, California (later Travis Air Force Base)
- 1 November 1949: Barksdale Air Force Base, Louisiana
- 29 September 1950: Hunter Air Force Base, Georgia
- 1 November 1950: Ramey Air Force Base, Puerto Rico
- 1 February 1951: Lake Charles Air Force Base, Louisiana
  (later Chennault Air Force Base)
- 1 March 1951: Lockbourne Air Force Base, Ohio (later Rickenbacker Air Force Base)
- 23 July 1951: George Air Force Base, California
- 1 August 1951: Sedalia Air Force Base, Missouri (later Whiteman Air Force Base)
- 1 September 1951: Pinecastle Air Force Base, Florida (later McCoy Air Force Base)
- 20 May 1952: Dow Air Force Base, Maine
- 5 January 1953: Homestead Air Force Base, Florida
- 15 February 1953: Loring Air Force Base, Maine
- 18 December 1953: Malmstrom Air Force Base, Montana
- 1 February 1954: Lincoln Air Force Base, Nebraska
- 21 June 1954: Altus Air Force Base, Oklahoma
- 1 February 1955: Little Rock Air Force Base, Arkansas
- 1 February 1955: Plattsburgh Air Force Base, New York
- 1 February 1955: Portsmouth Air Force Base, New Hampshire
  (later Pease Air Force Base)
- 15 March 1955: Clinton-Sherman Air Force Base, Oklahoma
- 1 April 1955: Westover Air Force Base, Massachusetts
- 1 April 1955: Columbus Air Force Base, Mississippi
- 15 April 1956: Abilene Air Force Base, Texas (later Dyess Air Force Base)
- 1 May 1956: Turner Air Force Base, Georgia
- 1 July 1956: Beale Air Force Base, California
- 1 April 1957: Laughlin Air Force Base, Texas
- 5 June 1957: Richard I. Bong Air Force Base, Wisconsin
  (base never completed; declared excess 23 August 1960)
- 1 September 1957: Bunker Hill Air Force Base, Indiana (later Grissom Air Force Base)
- 1 January 1958: Vandenberg Air Force Base, California
- 1 February 1958: Francis E. Warren Air Force Base, Wyoming
- 1 April 1958: Blytheville Air Force Base, Arkansas (later Eaker Air Force Base)
- 1 August 1958: Wurtsmith Air Force Base, Michigan
- 1 January 1960: Larson Air Force Base, Washington
- 1 April 1960: Glasgow Air Force Base, Montana
- 1 July 1962: Minot Air Force Base, North Dakota
- 1 July 1963: Grand Forks Air Force Base, North Dakota
- 1 January 1964: K. I. Sawyer Air Force Base, Michigan
- 1 October 1968: Kincheloe Air Force Base, Michigan
- 1 July 1970: Griffiss Air Force Base, New York
- 1 July 1972: McConnell Air Force Base, Kansas
- 1 October 1979: Peterson AFB, Colorado and various BMEWS and SSN radar stations

In addition to bases under its operational control, SAC also maintained tenant wings at several bases under the control of other USAF MAJCOMs. These non-SAC bases with SAC tenants included:

- Amarillo AFB, Texas
- Eglin AFB, Florida
- Lowry AFB, Colorado
- Mather AFB, California
- Robins AFB, Georgia
- Seymour Johnson AFB, North Carolina
- Sheppard AFB, Texas
- Wright-Patterson AFB, Ohio

SAC also often maintained a tenant presence at former SAC bases that the command subsequently transferred and relinquished to other MAJCOMs, to include but not limited to:

- Altus AFB, Oklahoma
- Laughlin AFB, Texas
- MacDill AFB, Florida
- Homestead AFB, Florida
- Travis AFB, California

== Run-up to Korea and start of the Cold War ==
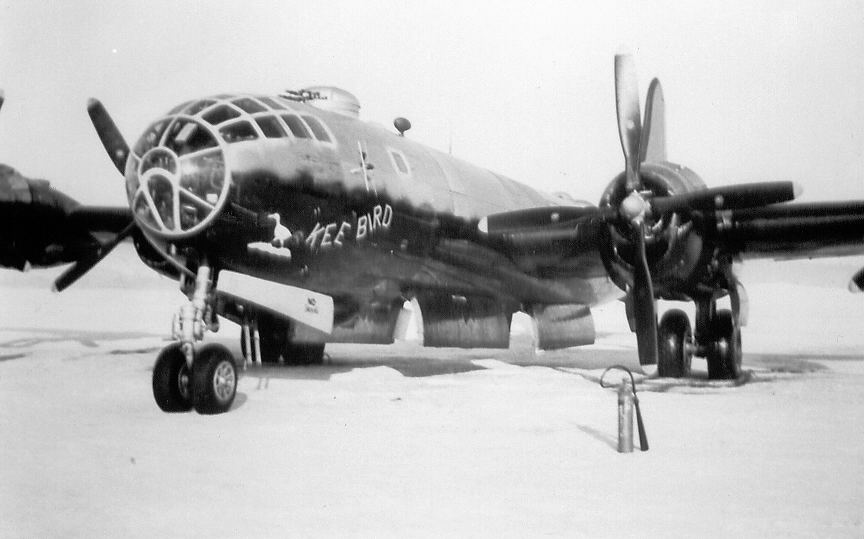
The RB-29 "Kee Bird" made an emergency landing in Greenland after a secret 1947 mission.

SAC transferred to the United States Air Force on 26 September 1947, concurrent with the latter's establishment as a separate military service. Units directly under SAC HQ included the 8AF and 15AF, as well as the 311th Air Division, 4th Fighter Wing, 82nd Fighter Wing, 307th Bomb Wing, and two reconnaissance units, the 311th Reconnaissance Wing and the 46th Reconnaissance Squadron. The 56th Fighter Wing was subsequently assigned to SAC on 1 October 1947.

Following the establishment of the U.S. Air Force, most SAC installations on U.S. territory were renamed as "Air Force Base" during late 1947 and into 1948, while non-U.S. installations were renamed as "Air Base".

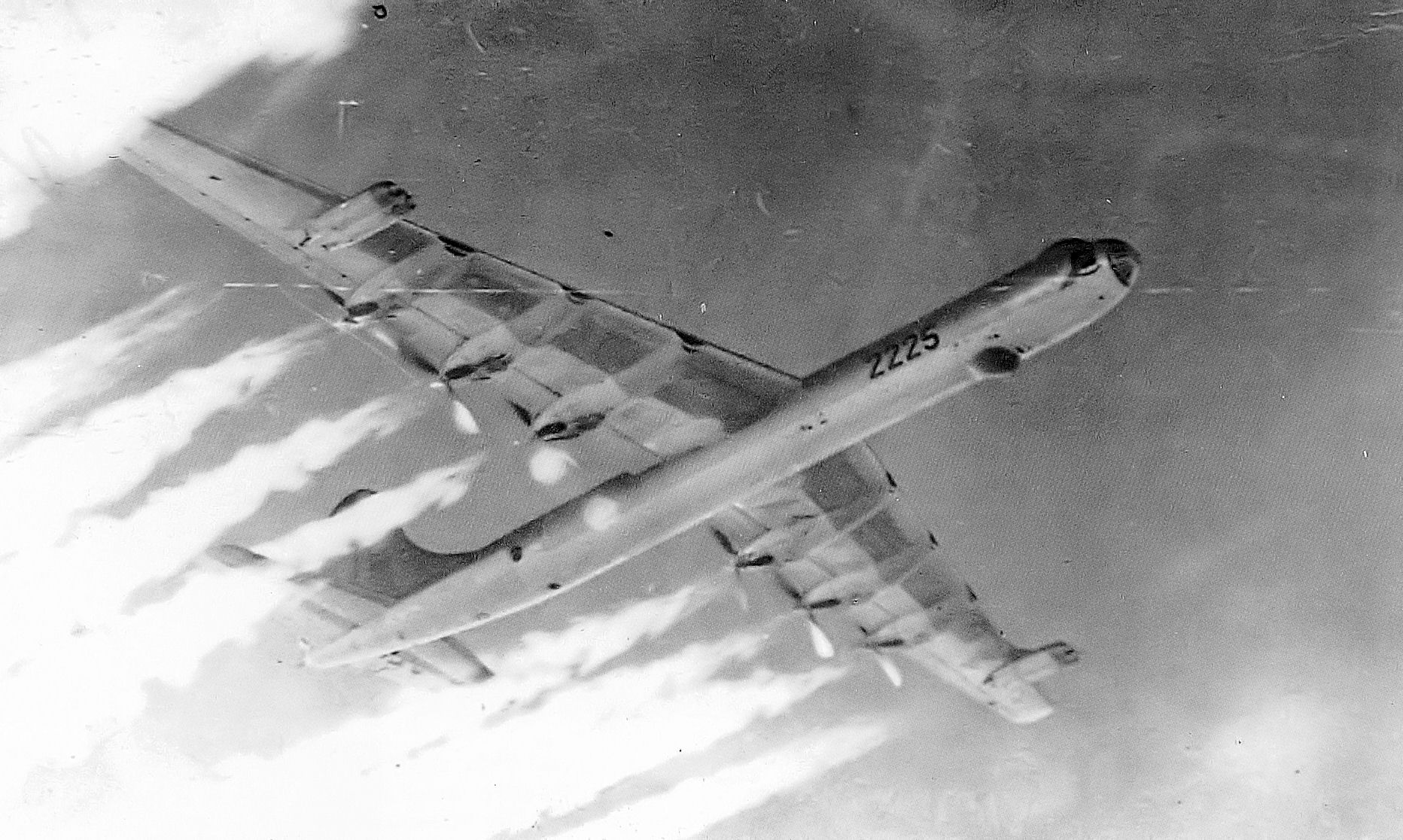
11th Bombardment Wing Convair B-36J-5-CF Peacemaker, AF Ser. No. 52-2225, circa 1955, showing "Six turnin', four burnin'".

In May 1948, in an exercise versus Air Defense Command's "Blue" force, a SAC "Red" strike force simulated attacks on Eastern Seaboard targets as far south as Virginia. After a "scathing" 1948 Lindbergh review of SAC operations in the air and at six SAC bases, General Kenney was removed as Commanding General on 15 October 1948 and replaced on 19 October 1948 by 8AF's commander, Lieutenant General Curtis LeMay. Upon LeMay's assumption of command, SAC had only 60 nuclear-capable aircraft, none of which possessed a realistic long range capability against the Soviet Union. LeMay proposed that SAC should be able to deliver 80% of its weapons in one mission. The B-29D, which had become the B-50 in December 1945, was first delivered to SAC in June 1948. This was followed by SAC's first Convair B-36 Peacemaker bomber arriving at Kirtland AFB, New Mexico in September 1948.

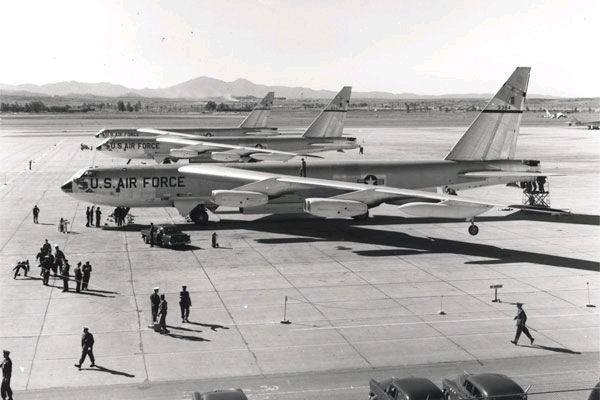
93 BW B-52Bs at Castle AFB after the 1957 fastest round-the-world flight.

In November 1948, LeMay had SAC's headquarters and its command post moved from Andrews AFB, Maryland to Offutt AFB, Nebraska. At Offutt, the command moved into the "A Building", a three-story facility that had previously been used by the Glenn L. Martin Company during World War II. Concurrent with the establishment of this new headquarters facility, Lemay also increased SAC Radar Bomb Scoring (RBS) runs the same year to 12,084. SAC also enhanced its organic fighter escort capability by initiating replacement of its World War II vintage piston-engine F-51D Mustang and F-82E Twin Mustang fighter aircraft with F-84G Thunderjets. In January 1949, SAC conducted simulated raids on Wright-Patterson AFB, Ohio. Assessments of these simulated raids by "...LeMay's entire command...were appalling", despite the SAC deputy commander, Major General McMullen, having instructed all bomber units to improve their effectiveness. To motivate crews and improve operational effectiveness command-wide, SAC established a competition, the first so-called "Bomb Comp" in 1948. Winners of this inaugural event were the 43rd Bombardment Group (unit) and, for aircrew award, a B-29 team from the 509th Bombardment Group. Given its global operating environment, SAC also opened its own survival school at Camp Carson, Colorado in 1949, later moving this school to Stead AFB, Nevada in 1952 before transferring the school to the Air Training Command in 1954.

SAC also created Emergency War Plan 1–49 (EWP 1–49), which outlined the means for delivering 133 atomic bombs, "...the entire stockpile...in a single massive attack..." on 70 Soviet cities over a 30-day period. The first Soviet atomic bomb test occurred on 29 August 1949 and the Joint Chiefs of Staff (JCS) subsequently identified SAC's primary objective was to damage or destroy the Soviet Union's ability to deliver nuclear weapons. The JCS further defined SAC's secondary objective was to stop any Soviet advances into Western Europe, and its tertiary objective was the previous EWP 1–49 industrial mission.

== Korean War ==
In July 1950, in response to combat operations on the Korean peninsula, SAC dispatched ten nuclear-capable bombers to Guam and deployed four B-29 bomber wings in Korea for tactical operations, although this action caused SAC commander LeMay to comment "...too many splinters were being whittled off the [deterrence] stick".

Initial SAC B-29 successes against North Korea in the summer of 1950 were countered by subsequent Soviet MiG-15 fighter-interceptors, and SAC's 27th Fighter Escort Wing began escorting the bombers with F–84 Thunderjets. Ground-directed bombing (GDB) was subsequently used for close air support (CAS) missions after three SAC radar bomb scoring (RBS) squadron detachments (Dets C, K, & N) arrived at Pusan in September 1950. In 1951, SAC "began to eliminate its combat groups", transferring medium bombardment groups "to Far East Air Forces (FEAF) Bomber Command for combat." In 1951, LeMay convinced the Air Staff to allow SAC to approve nuclear targets, and he continued refusing to submit war plans for JCS review, which the JCS eventually came to accept (of 20,000 candidates in 1960, SAC designated 3,560 as bombing targets—mostly Soviet air defense: airfields and suspected missile sites.)

Although experimented with prior to World War II, SAC refined aerial refueling to a fine art. SAC's in-flight refueling mission began in July 1952 when its 31st Fighter-Escort Wing refueled sixty F-84G Thunderjets from Turner AFB, Georgia to Travis AFB, California non-stop with fuel from twenty-four KB-29P Superfortresses modified into aerial tankers. Exercise FOX PETER ONE followed with 31st FEW fighters being refueled Hickam AFB en route to Hawaii. On 15 March 1953, a 38th Strategic Reconnaissance Squadron RB-50 returned fire on a Soviet MiG-15, while a 343d Strategic Reconnaissance Squadron RB-50 was shot down over the Sea of Japan 2 days after the Korean Armistice, while on 7 November 1954, an RB-29 was shot down near Hokkaido Island in northern Japan. By the time of 27 July 1953 Korean War cease-fire, SAC B-29s had flown over 21,000 sorties and dropped nearly 167,000 tons of bombs, with thirty-four B-29s lost in combat and forty-eight B-29s were lost to damage or crashes.

== Cold War and massive retaliation ==
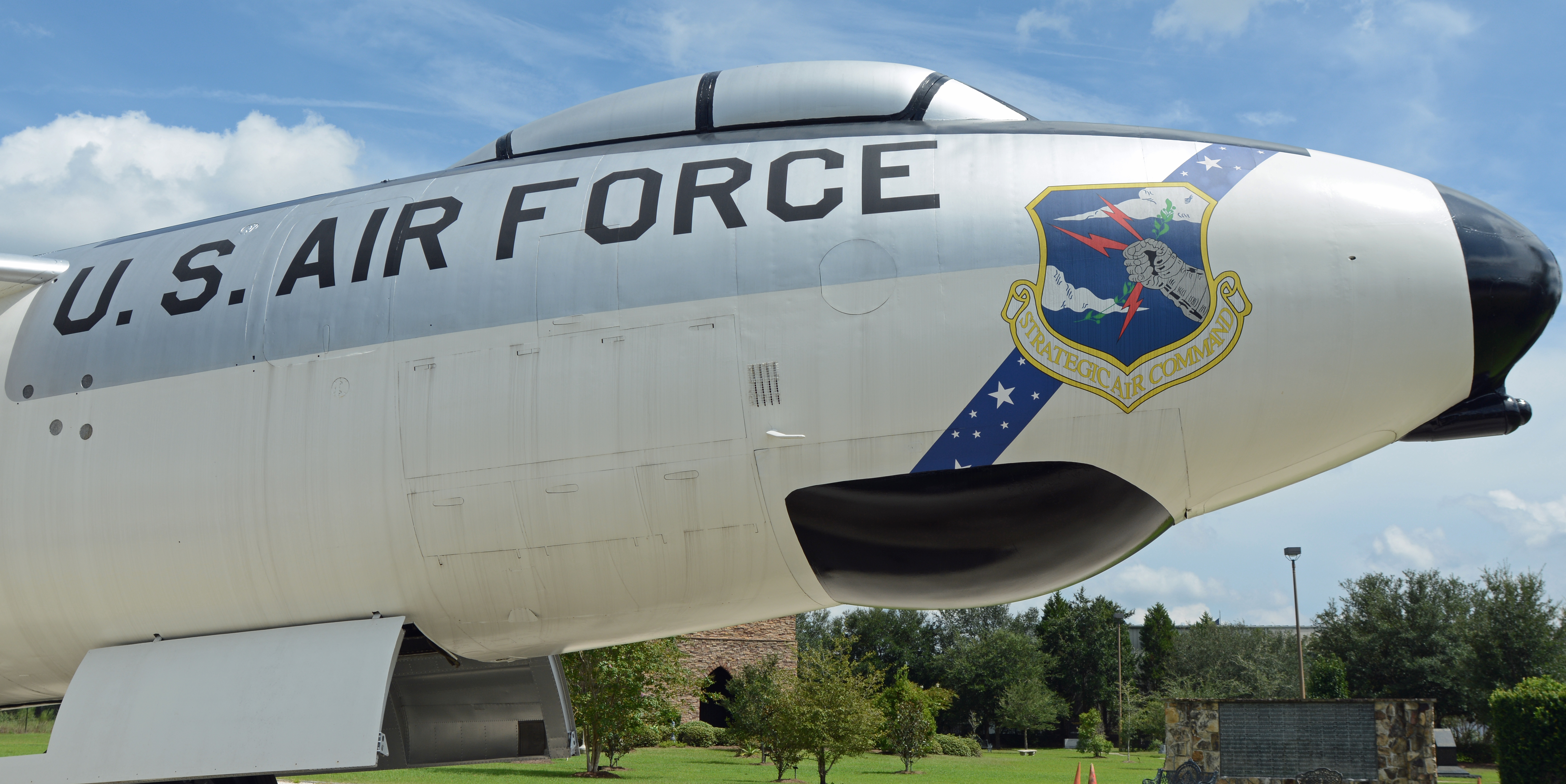
Strategic Air Command logo on a B-47 on display at the National Museum of the Mighty Eighth Air Force in Pooler, Georgia

SAC's first jet strategic bomber was the swept-wing B-47 medium bomber, which first entered service in 1951 and became operational within SAC in 1953. The B-47 was a component of the October 1953 New Look strategy, which articulated, in part, that: "...to minimize the threat...the major purpose of air defense was not to shoot down enemy bombers—it was to allow SAC...to get into the air[--and] not be destroyed on the ground[--to allow] massive retaliation."

Concern of a bomber gap grew after the 1955 Soviet Aviation Day and the Soviets rejected the "Open Skies" Treaty proposed at the Geneva Summit on 21 July 1955. US bomber strength peaked with "over 2,500 bombers" after production "of over 2,000 B-47s and almost 750 B-52s" (circa 1956, 50% of SAC aircraft & 80% of SAC bombers were B-47s).

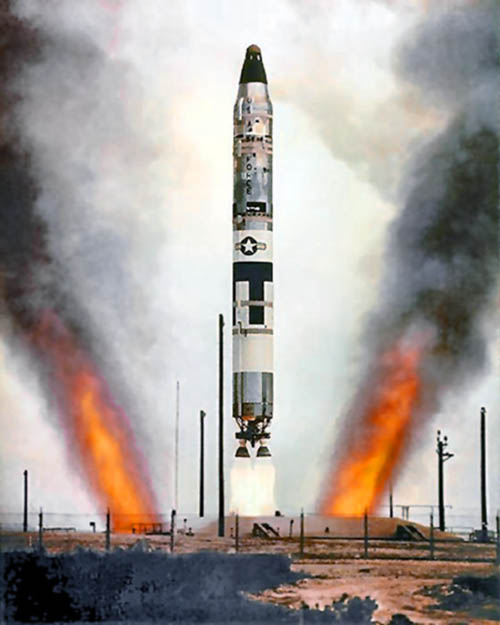
Titan II missile launching from Site 395-C, a test launch silo at Vandenberg AFB.

In an effort to concurrently enhance its reconnaissance capabilities, SAC also received several RB-57D Canberra aircraft in April 1956, with the aircraft initially based at Turner AFB, Georgia. In 1957, these aircraft were forward deployed to Rhein-Main Air Base, West Germany, in order to conduct reconnaissance missions along the borders of the Soviet Union and other Warsaw Pact nations. However, an unintended consequence of this deployment was that Hawker Hunter fighters of the Royal Air Force stationed in the United Kingdom and in continental Europe often intercepted these classified RB-57 missions as they returned to Rhein-Main AB from over the Baltic.

Since it was designed as a medium bomber, SAC's B-47 Stratojet traded speed for range. Because of this shorter range, and in order to better enable the B-47 fleet to reach its target sets in the Soviet Union, SAC routinely deployed its US-based B-47 wings to overseas forward operating bases in North Africa, Spain and Turkey. This program, in effect from 1957 to 1966, was known as Operation Reflex with Sixteenth Air Force (16AF), a SAC numbered air force permanently stationed in Europe, having tactical and administrative control of the forward-deployed aircraft and units. Beginning in 1955, SAC also moved a portion of its bomber and aerial refueling aircraft to 24-hour alert status, either on the ground or airborne. By 1960, fully one third of SAC's bombers and aerial refueling aircraft were on 24-hour alert, with those crews and aircraft not already airborne ready to take off from designated alert sites at their respective bases within fifteen minutes. Bomber aircraft on ground alert were armed with nuclear weapons while aerial tanker aircraft were sufficiently fueled to provide maximum combat fuel offload to the bombers.

"The Martin Company: Ten Years To Remember" (1964). Official USAF ICBM development promotional film reel.

Concurrent with this increased alert posture and in order to better hone strategic bombing skillsets, the 1955 SAC Bombing and Navigation Competition was characterized by radar bomb scoring (RBS) runs on Amarillo, Denver, Salt Lake City, Kansas City, San Antonio and Phoenix; and the 1957 competition (nicknamed "Operation Longshot") had three targets: Atlanta, Kansas City, and St. Louis. This use of RBS with simulated target areas utilizing mobile and fixed bomb scoring sites adjacent to major cities, industrial areas, military installations and dedicated bombing ranges throughout the United States. This format would continue through successive SAC Bombing and Navigation Competitions through the remainder of the 1950s, 1960s, 1970s and 1980s. Commencing in the late 1950s, in addition to representation from every SAC wing with a bombing and/or air refueling mission, later SAC competitions would also include participating bomber and aerial refueling units from the Royal Air Force's Bomber Command and (after 30 April 1968) its successor, RAF Strike Command.

== Nuclear Bunkers, SAC Ground Alert, and transfer of SAC's Fighter-Escort Wings ==
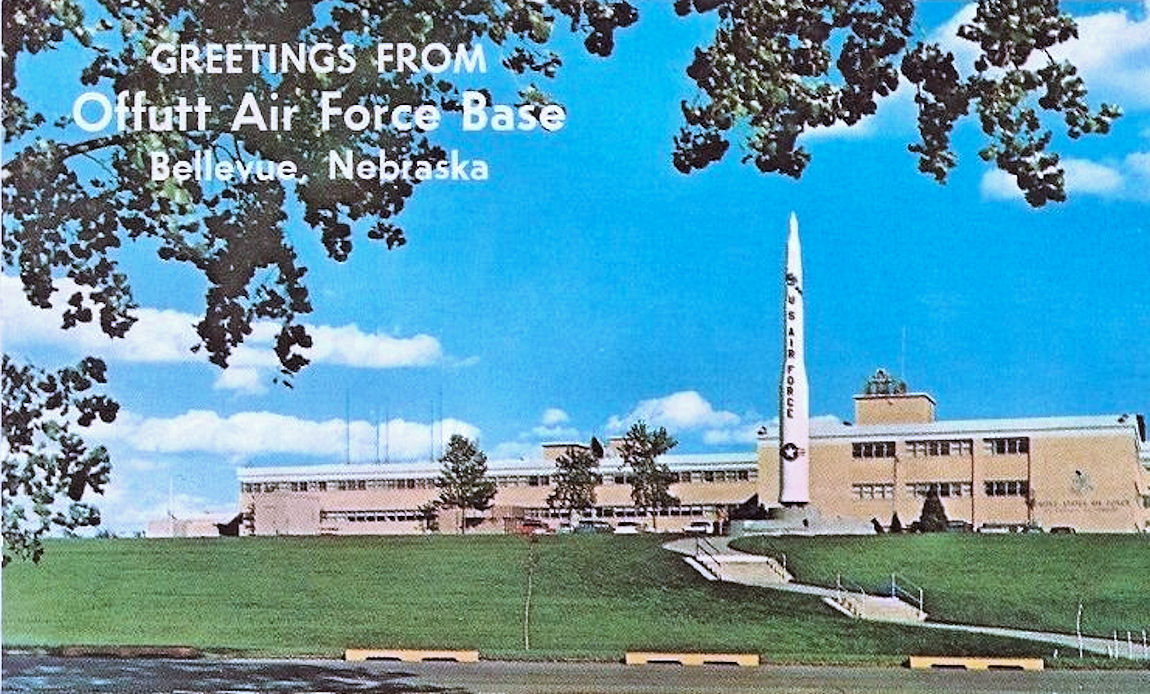
Strategic Air Command Headquarters at Offutt Air Force Base, Nebraska.

It was described as the "Western Pentagon," specifically a, "...four-story, reinforced concrete and masonry office building..." above ground and a "...segregated, adjacent three-story below ground command post." This was the description of what would become Building 500 at Offutt AFB and the new headquarters complex built expressly for SAC, with construction commencing in 1955. SAC headquarters moved from the A Building at Offutt AFB to Building 500 in 1957. The underground nuclear bunker had 24-inch thick walls and base floor, 10-inch thick intermediate floors, and 24-to-42-inch thick roof. It also contained a war room with six 16-foot data display screens and the capacity to sustain up to 800 people underground for two weeks. The below ground bunker portion of the headquarters complex also contained an IBM 704 computer, which was used to develop monthly weather forecasts at targets, as well as for computing fuel consumption and fallout cloud patterns for planning strike routes and egress routes (e.g., determining the timing as to which targets to bomb first).

In 1957, SAC also constructed The Notch, a facility alternatively known as the 8th Air Force Combat Operations Center (COC) and the Westover Communications Annex, since it was a sub-post of nearby Westover AFB. A 3-story nuclear bunker located on Bare Mountain, Massachusetts, The Notch was built with three-foot thick walls, 1.5 foot thick steel blast doors, and 20 feet underground to protect 350 people for 35 days. The Notch was shut down as a SAC facility in 1970 when 8th Air Force was relocated to Barksdale AFB, Louisiana.

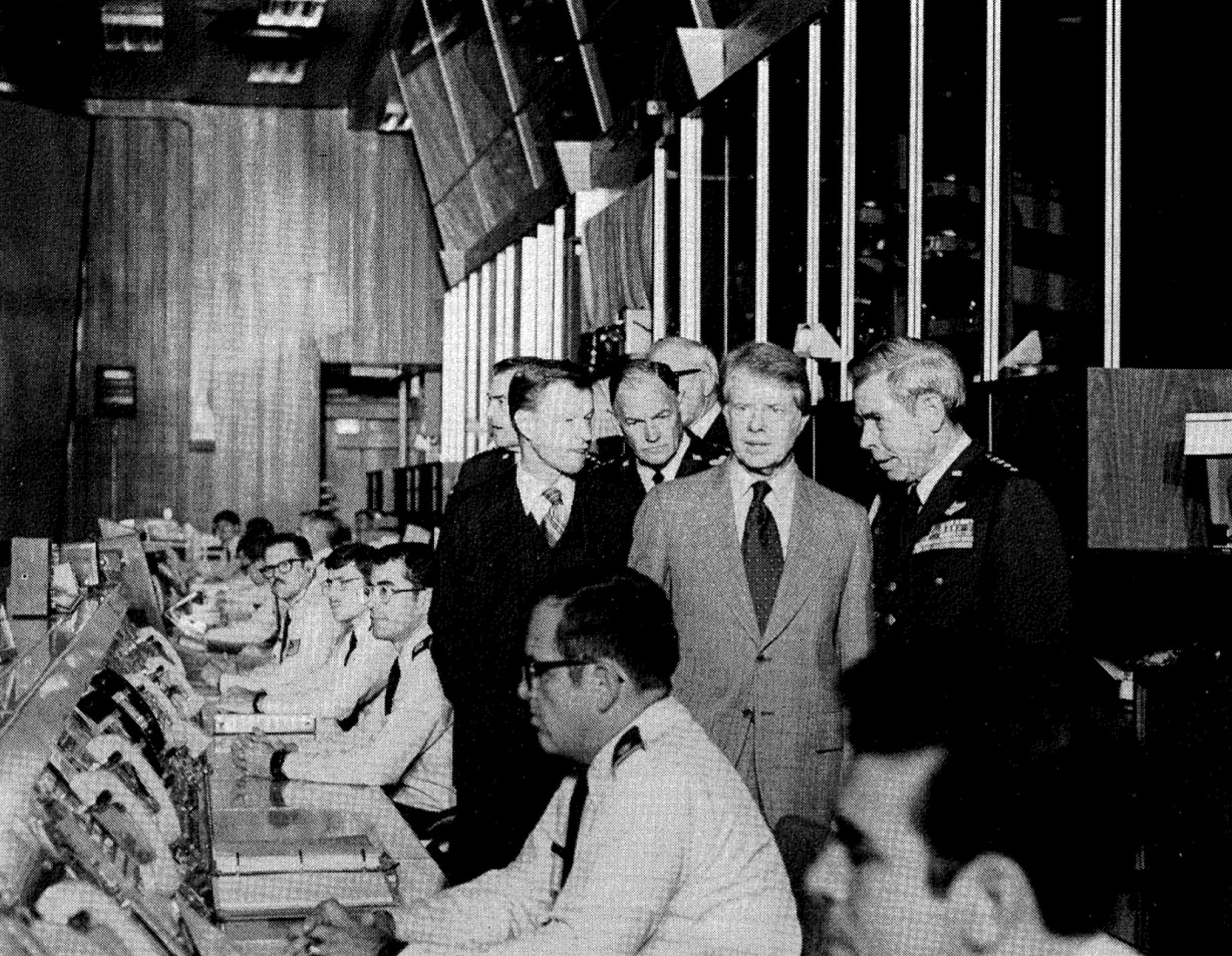
U.S. President Jimmy Carter visiting SAC Headquarters.

Despite this investment in "hardened" headquarters and command and control facilities, the 1957 Gaither Commission identified, "...little likelihood of SAC's bombers surviving [a Soviet first strike] since there was no way to detect an incoming attack until the first [Soviet nuclear weapon] warhead landed." As a result, SAC's bombers and tankers began sitting armed ground alert at their respective bases on 1 Oct 57. In another organizational change during this time period, SAC's fighter escort wings were transferred to Tactical Air Command (TAC) during 1957 and 1958. Finally, during January 1958's Exercise Fir Fly, SAC "faker" aircraft (twelve B-47s) simulated bombing strikes against metropolitan areas and military installations in the United States defended by Air Defense Command's 28th Air Division.

== Nuclear missiles, aircrew readiness, airborne alert, and strategic reconnaissance ==
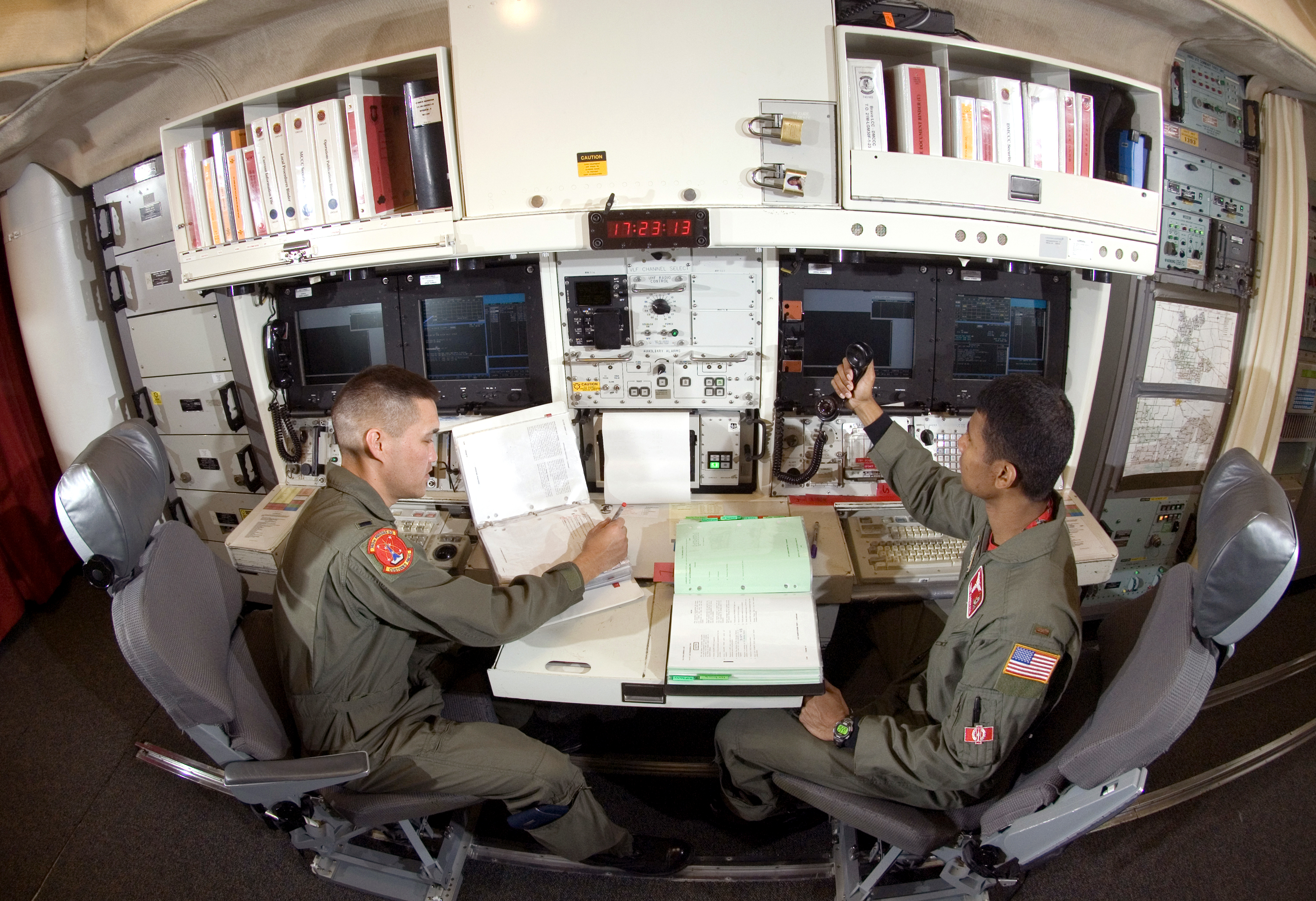
Minuteman ICBM crew on alert in a launch complex at Minot Air Force Base, North Dakota

After SAC's 1st Missile Division was activated on 18 March 1957, SAC HQ established the Office of Assistant CINCSAC (SAC MIKE) at the Air Force Ballistic Missile Division in California on 1 January 1958. SAC MIKE was responsible for missile development liaison, the intermediate range Jupiter and Thor missiles having been transferred to SAC for alert in 1958.

Beginning on 1 February 1958, a SAC Liaison Team was also located at the NORAD Command Post at Ent AFB, Colorado, and the two commands agreed that direct land line communications should connect SAC bases with NORAD's Air Defense Direction Centers. Also in the late 1950s, SAC continued to enhance its intelligence collection activities and develop innovative means of improving the survivability of its forces to surprise attack. From 1958 to about 1967, a SAC Detachment (TUSLOG Det 50) operated at Incirlik AB, Turkey, monitoring Soviet missile telemetry from the Kapustin Yar and Tyuratam launch complexes. In 1959–60, SAC evaluated deploying Minuteman I ICBMs via civilian railroad tracks on USAF-operated locomotives and trains.

United States LGM-30 Minuteman ICBM nuclear weapon system and silo operational development, 1974.

President Eisenhower approved the first Atlas ICBM launch by a SAC crew for 9 September 1959 at Vandenberg AFB. While missile operations continued to ramp up, robust training for flight crews to ensure survivability for strike missions also continued. In some instances SAC bombers would oppose ADC fighter-interceptors simulating Soviet interceptors. Conversely, SAC assisted ADC readiness by simulating Soviet bomber threats to the continental United States that ADC fighters would respond to. However, following a mid-air collision between an ADC F-102 and a SAC B-47 during a 17 December 1959 Quick Kick exercise, simulated NORAD fighter attacks were prohibited against SAC bombers.

On 18 March 1960, SAC intercontinental missiles began alert at Maine's Snark Missile Launch Complex adjacent to Presque Isle AFB. The following month, on 22 April 1960, SAC turned over the last British-based PGM-17 Thor IRBM to the Royal Air Force. This was soon followed by SAC's first Titan I ICBMs at Lowry AFB's Titan I Missile Complex 1A in Colorado being placed on alert that June.

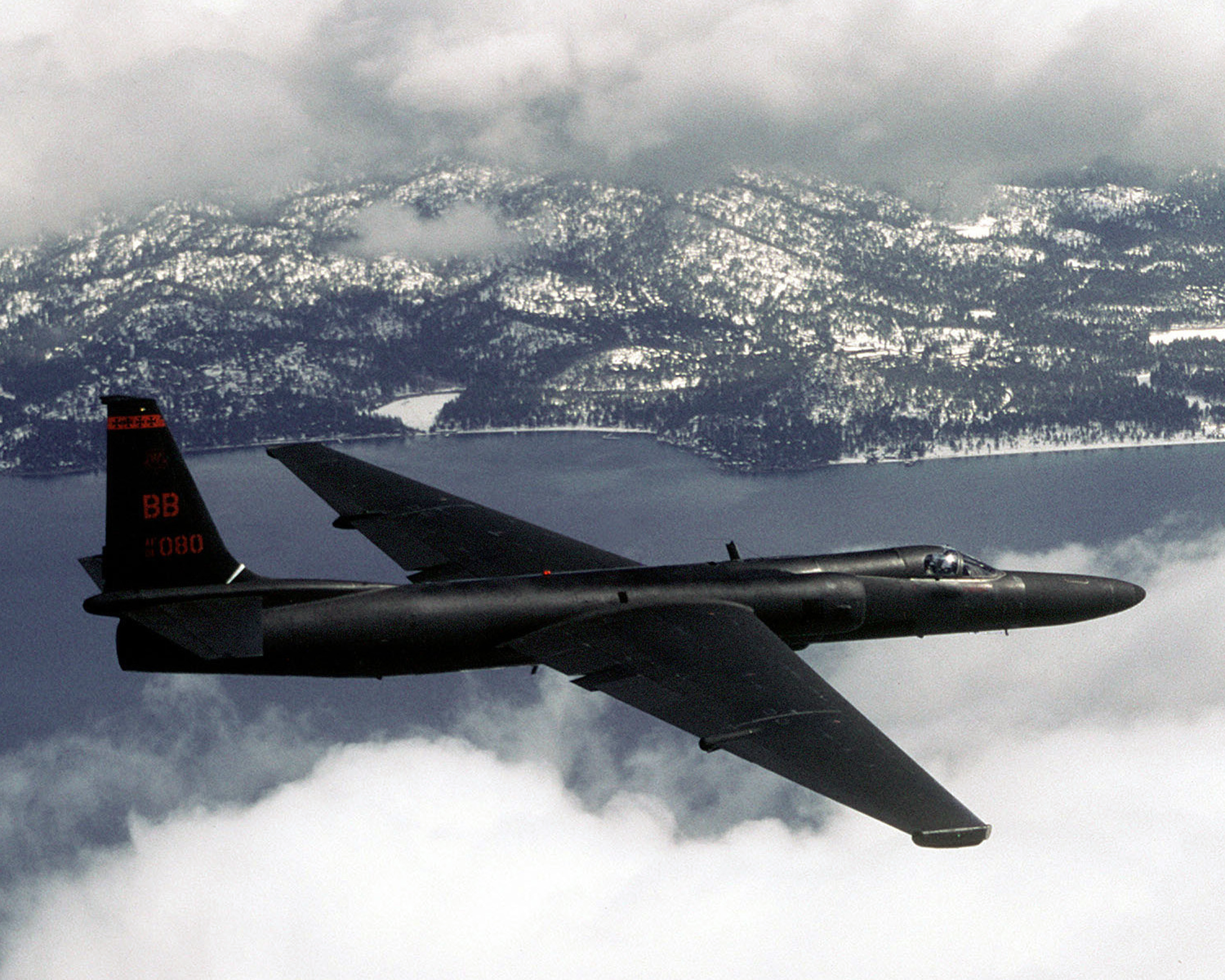
SAC received its first Lockheed U-2 aircraft in June 1957.

Beginning in November 1959, in order to counter Soviet surface-to-air missile threats, SAC began adding low-altitude bombing training for its manned bomber force as an adjunct to its legacy high-altitude training. Use of low level flight route corridors known as "Oil Burner" routes (later renamed "Olive Branch" routes in the 1970s), and the first of three SAC RBS trains were utilized starting in 1960. On 30 June 1960, SAC had 696 aircraft on alert in the Zone of Interior, also known as the ZI (referred to today as the Continental United States, or CONUS) and at overseas bases. These 696 aircraft were 113 B-52s, 346 B-47s, 85 KC-135s, and 152 KC-97s. SAC's Emergency War Order (EWO) required the first aircraft to be airborne within 8 minutes and all aircraft to be airborne within 15 minutes after notification. During the mid-1950s, having recalled numerous World War II USAAF and Korean War USAF combat veteran pilots, navigators, bombardiers and aircrewmen from inactive reserve status back to various lengths of active duty, SAC took the lead in integrating the Air Force's reserve components into the overall SAC structure. By the beginning of the 1960s, SAC had also engineered the assignment of KC-97 Stratofreighter aerial refueling aircraft to Air National Guard groups and wings and having them fall under SAC's operational claimancy.

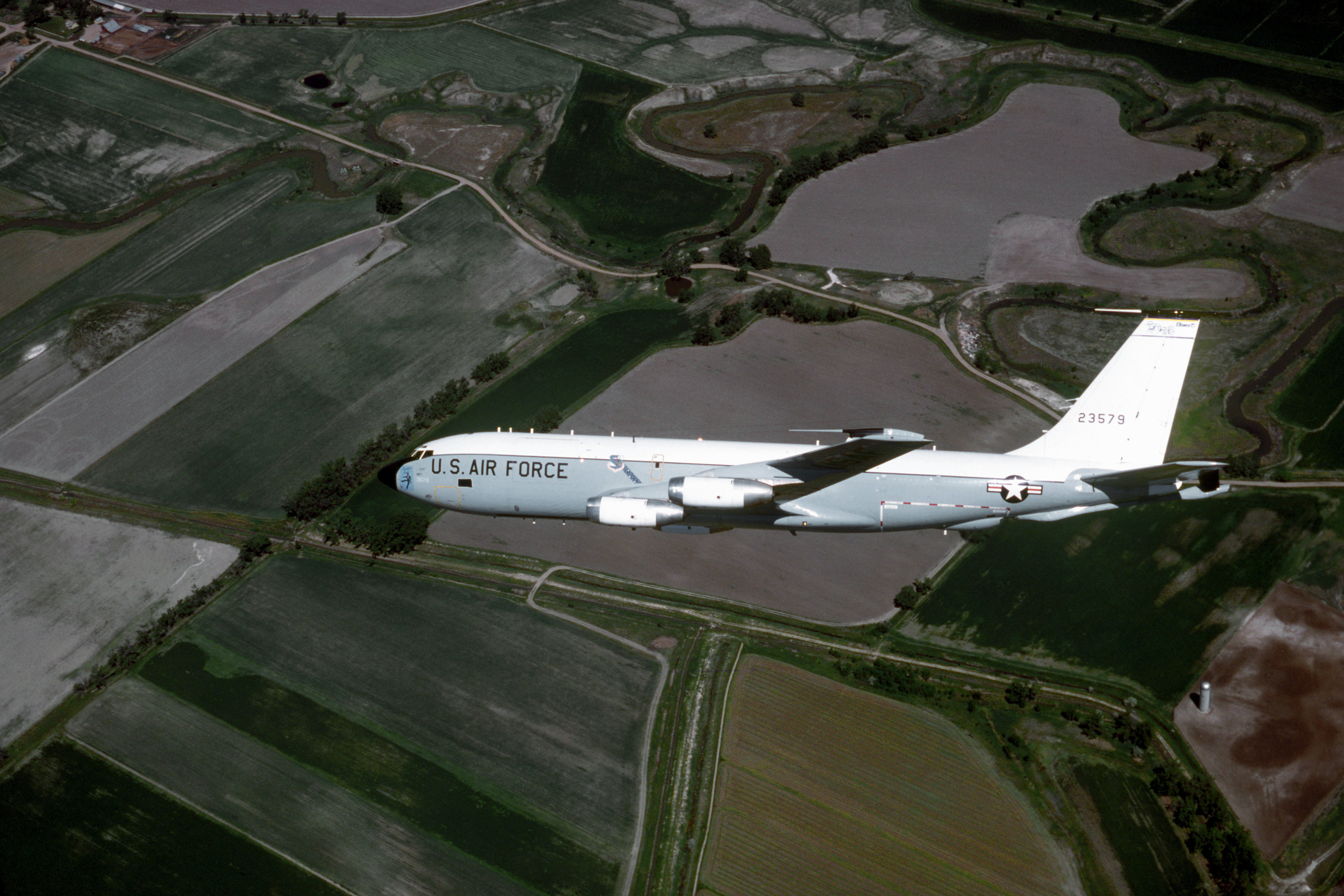
EC-135 Looking Glass aircraft

On 11 August 1960, President Eisenhower approved the creation of the Joint Strategic Target Planning Staff (JSTPS), co-located at SAC headquarters at Offutt AFB.) JSTPS also included non-SAC agencies tasked with preparing the Single Integrated Operation Plan, or SIOP, and the National Strategic Target List for nuclear war. On 1 July 1960, a SAC RB-47 with a six-man crew was shot down in international airspace over the Barents Sea by a Soviet MiG-19. Four of the crewmen were killed and two surviving crewmen were captured and held in Lubyanka Prison in Moscow for seven months. On 3 February 1961, SAC's Boeing EC-135 Looking Glass, began operations as the Airborne Command Post for the Nuclear Triad and the Post-Attack Command and Control System. From this date and for the next 29 1/2 years, until 24 July 1990, SAC would maintain at least one Looking Glass aircraft continuously aloft 24 hours a day, 365 days a year, with an embarked SAC general officer and battle staff, ready to assume command of all strategic nuclear strike forces in the event that SAC headquarters was destroyed in a Soviet first strike. SAC's airborne alerts during this period also included Operation Chrome Dome for the bomber and tanker force. Although ostensibly a peacetime mission, Chrome Dome placed heavy demands on flight crews and five B-52 aircraft were lost to airborne mishaps during the operation's eight-year period.

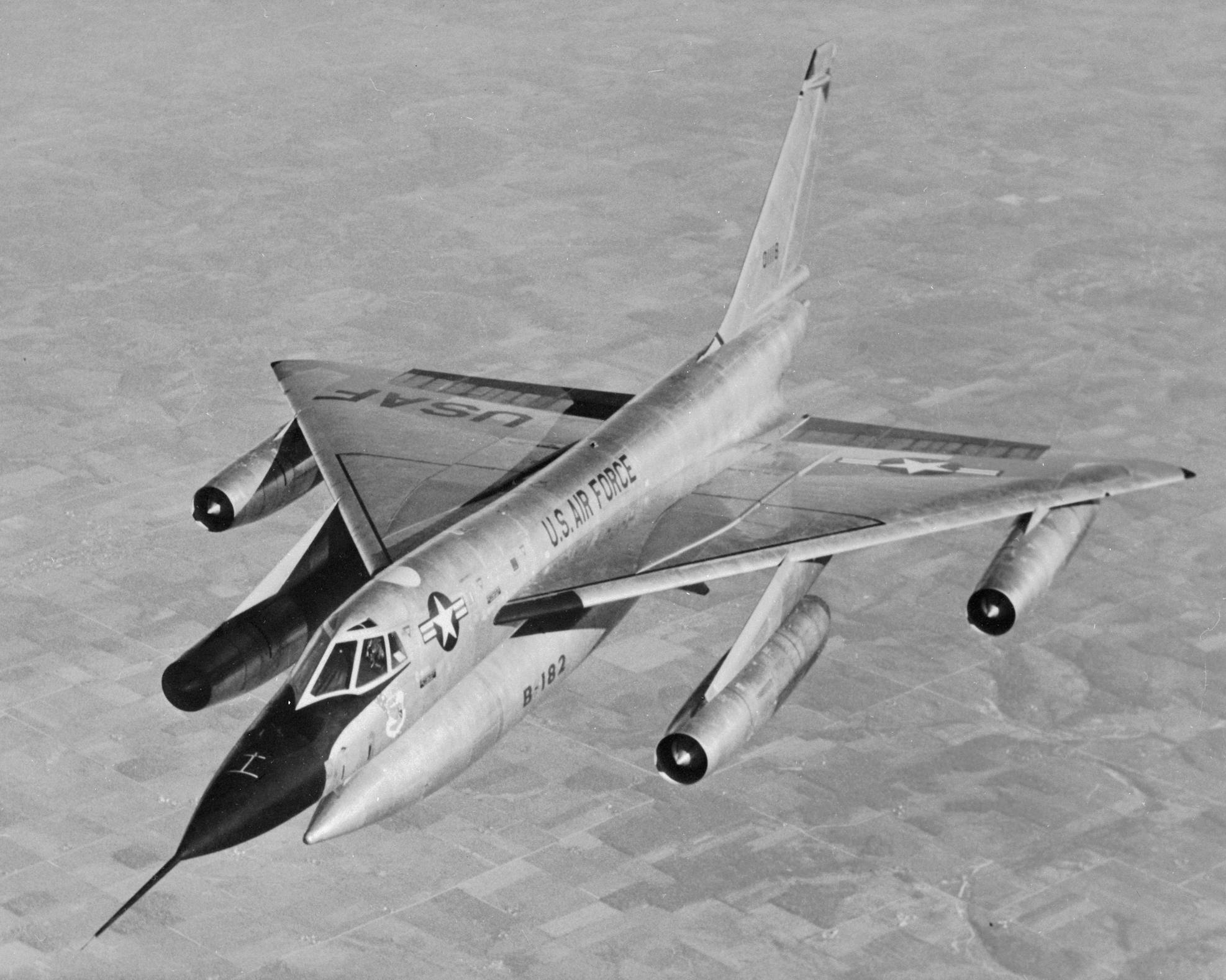
B-58A Hustler supersonic bomber

On 11 May 1961, SAC took delivery of its first B-58 Hustler supersonic medium bomber, assigning it to the 305th Bombardment Wing at Bunker Hill AFB. Optimized for high-altitude, high-speed penetration into Soviet territory prior to Soviet advancements in high-altitude surface-to-air missiles, the B-58 was expensive to operate and inefficient at lower altitudes. Its service in SAC would be comparatively short, eventually being replaced by the FB-111 by 1970.

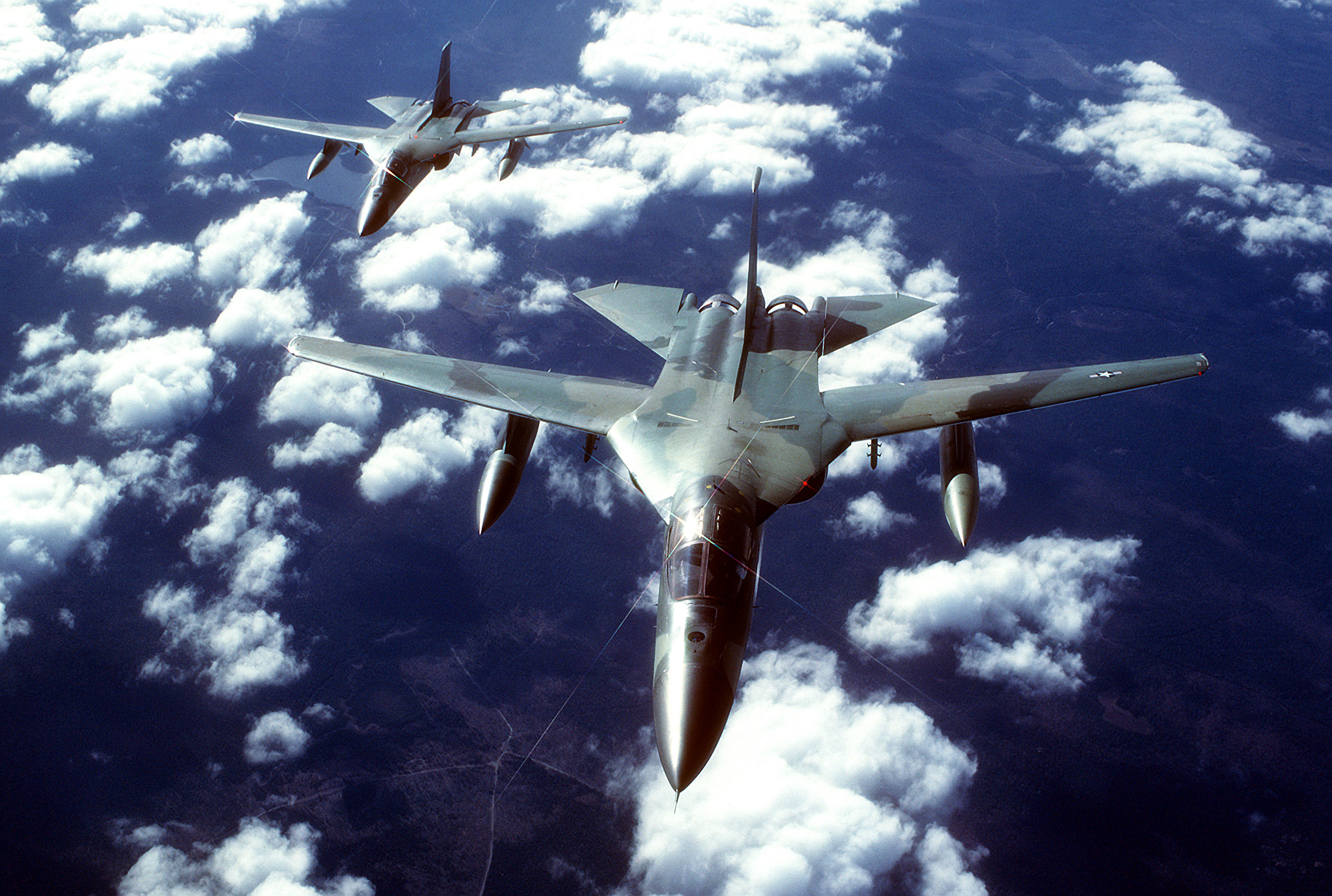
An overhead view of two SAC FB-111As in formation

After an early 1961 development by SAC of a Radar Bomb Scoring (RBS) field kit for use in the U.S. Army's Nike surface-to-air missile systems, SAC aircraft flew several mock penetrations into Air Defense Command sectors in the 1961 SAGE/Missile Master test program, as well as the joint SAC-NORAD Sky Shield II exercise followed by Sky Shield III on 2 September 1962.

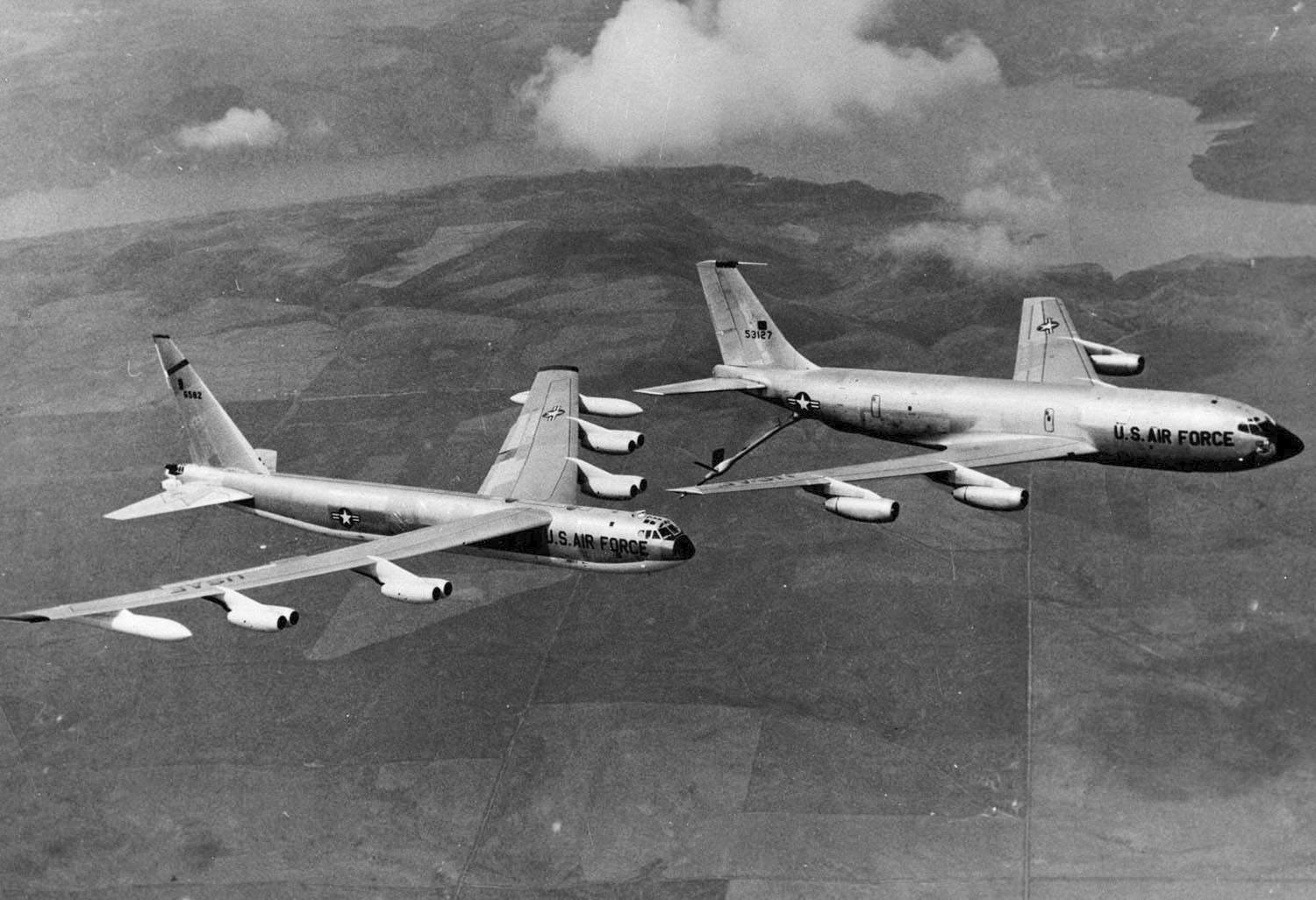
KC-135 refueling a B-52D in 1965, the year the last KC-135 was delivered to SAC.

In 1961, following the Berlin Crisis, President John F. Kennedy increased the number of SAC aircraft on alert to 50 percent and during periods of increased tensions SAC kept some B-52 airborne in the event of a surprise attack. In 1962, SAC gained full control of the various "Q Areas" developed by Sandia Laboratories for nuclear weapon storage adjacent to Loring AFB (Site E (Maine)/Caribou AFS), Ellsworth AFB (Site F (South Dakota)/Rushmore AFS), Fairchild AFB (Site G (Washington)/Deep Creek AFS), Travis AFB (Site H (California)/Fairfield AFS), and Westover AFB (Site I (Massachusetts)/Stony Brook AFS). These adjunct sites were subsequently converted to USAF-operated and maintained weapon storage areas (WSAs) in the same manner as WSAs on other SAC bases.

The solid fuel LGM-30A Minuteman I was first deployed in 1962 and the LGM-25C Titan II reached operational service in 1963. Project Added Effort phased out all first-generation ICBMs beginning on 1 May 1964 when Atlas-D were taken off alert at Vandenberg AFB's 576th SMS (LGM-30F Minuteman II replaced Minuteman I in 1965). In October 1962, an SAC BRASS KNOB mission U-2 piloted by Major Richard S. Heyser detected Soviet intermediate range ballistic missiles in Cuba. BRASS KNOB operations involving multiple U-2 aircraft were subsequently commenced at a forward operating location at McCoy AFB, Florida the same month. On the morning of 27 October, a SAC RB-47H of the 55th Strategic Reconnaissance Wing, forward deployed to Kindley AFB, Bermuda crashed on takeoff, killing all four crewmembers, while later that afternoon, a 4028th Strategic Reconnaissance Squadron U-2 forward deployed to McCoy AFB for BRASS KNOB operations was shot down over Cuba by an SA-2 Guideline missile, killing the pilot, Major Rudolf Anderson.

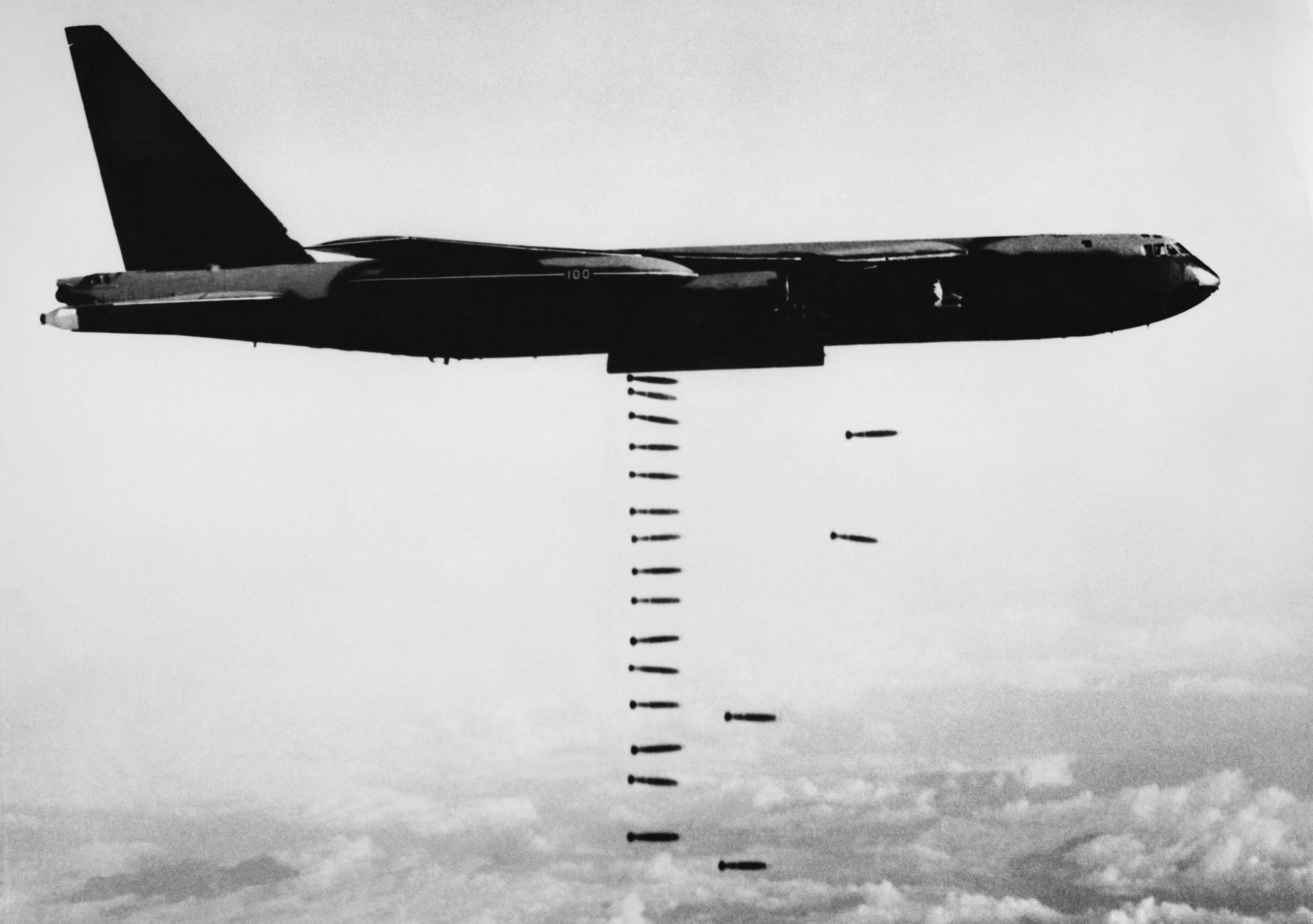
B-52D dropping bombs over Vietnam, circa 1970.

Throughout the early 1960s, the Kennedy Administration, under the aegis of Secretary of Defense McNamara, cancelled numerous SAC modernization programs. This included the Mach 3 North American B-70 Valkyrie in 1961, the GAM-87 Skybolt missile in 1962, and the Rocky Mountain Deep Underground Support Center in 1963. The B-70's demise came due to its design as a high-altitude bomber with very limited low-altitude performance, making it vulnerable to rapid advances in Soviet high altitude surface-to-air missile defense systems. The following year, Skybolt, an air-launched ballistic missile, was cancelled following numerous test failures and the perceived greater reliability of land-based and submarine-based ballistic missile systems. Although initially entering service in 1957, SAC's 2nd-generation aerial refueling aircraft, the KC-135 Stratotanker, had reached sufficient inventory numbers to allow SAC to begin divestiture of its KC-97 Stratofreighter tankers, transferring them to SAC-gained Air Force Reserve and Air National Guard units. As the KC-135 became the primary aerial tanker in active service, SAC employed the aircraft for several non-stop B-52 and KC-135 flights around the world, demonstrating that SAC no longer needed to depend on Reflex stations at air bases in Spain and Britain.)

== Vietnam War and latter half of the Cold War ==
=== SAC's air war in Vietnam ===
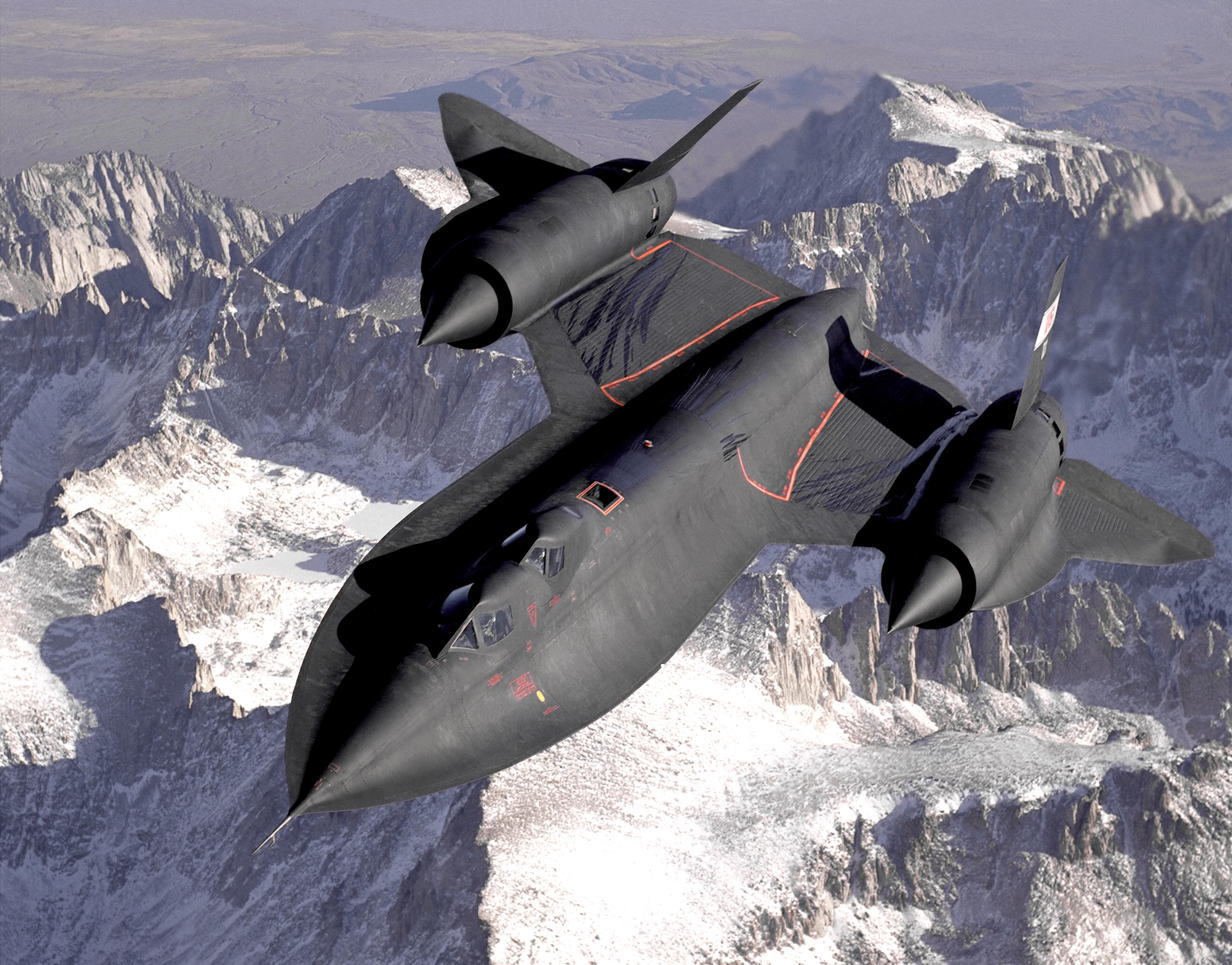
SAC SR-71 Blackbirds & U-2s deployed to the Vietnam War and conducted "Lucky Dragon" surveillance along North Vietnam and China borders (later named "Trojan Horse", "Olympic Torch", "Senior Book", and "Giant Dragon").

After Secretary of Defense Robert McNamara rejected LeMay's November 1964 proposal for a "...strategic air campaign against 94 targets in North Vietnam...", thirty SAC B-52Fs were deployed to Andersen AFB, Guam on 17 February 1965, representing the first increment of SAC aircraft forward deployed for the Vietnam War. The following month, in March 1965, the Strategic Air Command Advanced Echelon (SACADVON) was established as a "...liaison unit for CINCSAC [was] located at MACV Headquarters to assist with the B-52 effort." On 23 May 1965, SAC B-52Fs began unarmed missions for radar mapping "...and later to test bombing with the assistance of ground homing beacons..." SAC began saturation bombing on 18 June 1965 (8000 tons per month in 1966) and conducted Operation Arc Light missions from 1965 until the end of hostilities involving U.S. forces in 1973.

All B-52F missions in 1965 were against targets in South Vietnam (RVN) except for the December "...Duck Flight mission [that] hit a suspected VC supply storage area [for which] part of the target box was in Laos." In April 1966, Vietnam operations began with the B-52D model, a 1956 model designed to use the AGM-28 Hound Dog cruise missile and the ADM-20 Quail aerial decoys for low altitude operations and modified in late 1965 by Project Big Belly to increase conventional bomb capacity.

SAC's RBS Squadrons were discontinued when most detachment personnel transferred to Vietnam from 1966 to 1973 for Combat Skyspot ground-directed bombing operations. The first "Quick Reaction" bombing was the "Pink Lady" mission on 6 July 1966 using SAC B-52D/Fs to support the U.S. Army's 1st Air Cavalry Division. The 1972 Operation Linebacker II also used Skyspot for Hanoi/Haiphong bombings in North Vietnam which resulted in the loss of 25 SAC aircrew members.

By May 1967, SACADVON had moved to Seventh Air Force headquarters at Tan Son Nhut Air Base, South Vietnam to schedule and coordinate "...strikes for the 7th AF and MACV." From a level of 161,921 military and 20,215 civilian assigned to SAC in June 1968, SAC lost 13,698 first term airmen from November 1968 to May 1969 in a three phase drawdown known as Project 693 to comply with Public Law 90-364. While conventional bombing, air refueling and strategic air reconnaissance operations in Southeast Asia increasingly occupied SAC's operational commitments, SAC's primary mission of nuclear deterrence continued to remain its primary focus. In 1969, "...SAC's B-52s and B-58s could carry B28, B41, B43, B53, and BA53 nuclear weapons" (SAC had 311 nuclear AGM-28 Hound Dog missiles at the end of the year.) This also coincided with the B-58 Hustler's in-progress retirement from SAC's active inventory and its replacement with the FB-111.

On 18 March 1969, along the South Vietnamese border, SAC first bombed Cambodia (Operation Menu through 26 May 1970 was controlled by Skyspot). On 17 February 1970, SAC conducted the first "GOOD LOOK" bombing of Laos at the Plaine des Jarres after B-52 photorecon missions ("GOOD LOOK ALPHA" in August 1969 and "GOOD LOOK BRAVO" c. 15 January 1970) and the observations of a Skyspot installation in Thailand. SAC transferred "...HQ 8th AF...to Andersen AFB, Guam on 1 April 1970 to oversee B-52D/G operations and to complement SACADVON". 8th AF took over from Third Air Division the generation of "frag" orders based on daily strike requests and amendments from COMUSMACV. In 1970, SAC deployed the LGM-30G Minuteman III ICBM with multiple independently targetable reentry vehicle or MIRVs, for striking 3 targets, while concurrently retiring the B-58 Hustler supersonic bomber.

1972 saw the commencement of Operation Linebacker II, a combined Seventh Air Force and U.S. Navy Task Force 77 aerial bombing campaign, conducted against targets in North Vietnam during the final period of US involvement in the Vietnam War. Linebacker II was conducted from 18 to 29 December 1972, leading to several informal names such as "The December Raids" and "The Christmas Bombings". Unlike the previous Operation Rolling Thunder and Operation Linebacker interdiction operations, Linebacker II would be a "maximum effort" bombing campaign to destroy major target complexes in the Hanoi and Haiphong areas which could only be accomplished by SAC B-52D/Gs. It saw the largest heavy bomber strikes launched by the U.S. Air Force since the end of World War II. Linebacker II was a modified extension of the Operation Linebacker bombings conducted from May to October 1972, with the emphasis of the new campaign shifted to attacks by B-52 Stratofortress heavy bombers rather than smaller tactical fighter aircraft. During Linebacker II, a total of 741 B-52D/G sorties were dispatched from bases in Thailand and Guam to bomb North Vietnam and 729 actually completed their missions. Overall SAC losses during Linebacker II numbered fifteen B-52s. The U.S. government claimed that the operation had succeeded in forcing North Vietnam's Politburo to return to the negotiating table, with the Paris Peace Accords signed shortly after the operation.

By early 1973, offensive SAC air operations in Southeast Asia ceased and numerous SAC aircrewmen who had been shot down and captured as prisoners of war by North Vietnam were repatriated to the United States. SAC aircraft used during the Vietnam War included B-52D, B-52F, B-52G, KC-135A, KC-135Q, various versions of the RC-135, SR-71, U-2, and EC-135.

=== Post-Vietnam, 1970s budget cuts, 1980s renewal, and the Cold War redux ===
During the Vietnam War, due to the escalating costs of combat operations in Southeast Asia, SAC was required to close several SAC bases, consolidate other bases, or transfer several bases to other MAJCOMs, other services, or the Air Reserve Component in order to remain within budgetary constraints. This included:

- Altus AFB (transferred to MAC, later to AETC)
- Bergstrom AFB (transferred to TAC, then ACC until BRAC closure in 1993)
- Columbus AFB (transferred to ATC, now AETC)
- Clinton-Sherman AFB (closed)
- Dow AFB (closed; portion transferred to ANG as Bangor ANGB)
- Hunter AFB (transferred to US Army as Hunter AAF)
- Larson AFB (closed)
- Lincoln AFB (closed; portion transferred to ANG as Lincoln ANGB)
- Little Rock AFB (transferred to TAC, later MAC, now AMC)
- Mountain Home AFB (transferred to TAC, now ACC)
- Turner AFB (transferred to USN as NAS Albany in 1968, closed 1975)

With the Vietnam War draw-down following the Paris Peace Treaty in 1973, reduced defense budgets forced SAC to inactivate several more wings, close still more bases in CONUS and Puerto Rico, transfer still additional bases to other MAJCOMS or the Air Reserve Component, and retire older B-52B, B-52C, B-52E and B-52F aircraft:

- Davis-Monthan AFB (transferred to TAC, now ACC)
- Forbes AFB (closed; portion transferred to ANG as Forbes ANGB)
- Glasgow AFB (closed)
- Kincheloe AFB (closed)
- McCoy AFB (closed; portion transferred to USN as Naval Training Center Orlando McCoy Annex until its BRAC-directed closure in 1999)
- Ramey AFB (closed; portion transferred to USCG as CGAS Borinquen)
- Rickenbacker AFB (closed; portion transferred to ANG as Rickenbacker ANGB)
- Westover AFB (transferred to AFRES, now AFRC, as Westover ARB)
- Wright-Patterson AFB (tenant SAC presence departed and transferred to Beale AFB; base remained with AFLC, now AFMC)

In 1973, the National Emergency Airborne Command Post, or NEACP, aircraft entered SAC's inventory. Consisting of four Boeing E-4 aircraft, these highly modified Boeing 747 airframes were assigned to the 55th Strategic Reconnaissance Wing at Offutt AFB and were forward deployed as necessary to support the National Command Authority.

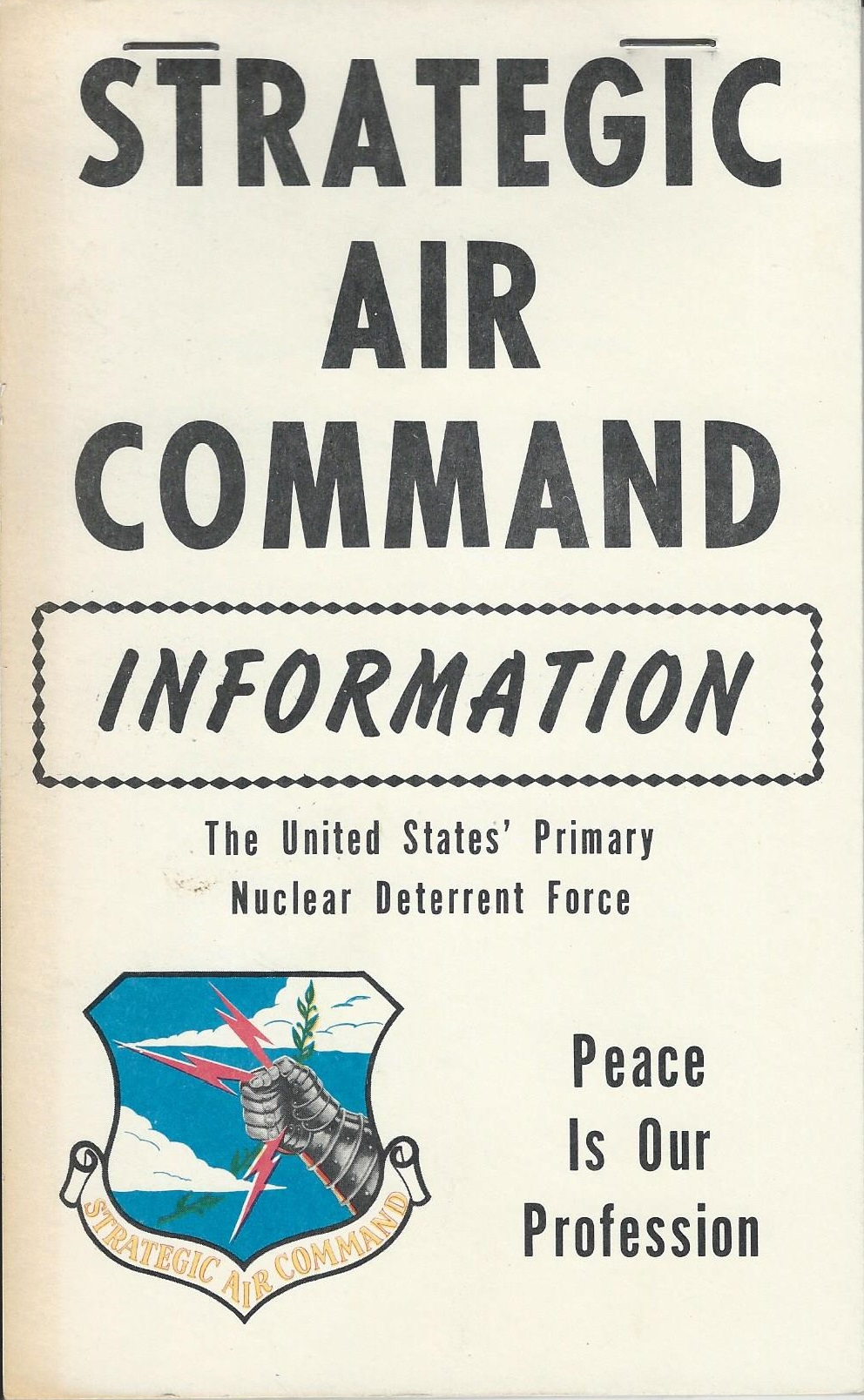
Cover of a 1975 SAC information booklet emphasizing its "Peace Is Our Profession" motto

By 1975, SAC's manned bomber strength included several hundred B-52D, B-52G, B-52H and FB-111A aircraft, and "...SAC's first major exercise in 23 years" was Exercise Global Shield 79. As for the ICBM force, SAC reached a peak strength of 1000 Minuteman II and III and 54 Titan II ICBMs on active status before seeing reductions and retirements through a combination of obsolescing systems and various arms reduction treaties with the Soviet Union. By 1977, SAC had been pinning its hopes for a new manned strategic bomber in the form of the Rockwell B-1A Lancer. However, on 30 June 1977, President Jimmy Carter Carter announced that the B-1A would be canceled in favor of ICBMs, submarine-launched ballistic missiles (SLBMs), and a fleet of modernized B-52s armed with air-launched cruise missiles (ALCMs). On 1 December 1979, SAC assumed control of the ballistic missile warning system (BMEWS) and all Space Surveillance Network facilities from the inactivating Aerospace Defense Command (ADC). These activities would later be (transferred to Air Force Space Command (AFSPC) when the latter was established in 1982. SAC also continued to operate the Air Force's entire KC-135 aerial refueling fleet, its EC-135 LOOKING GLASS and E-4 NEACAP command post aircraft, as well the entire strategic reconnaissance aircraft fleet consisting of the U-2, SR-71, RC-135, and WC-135.

In 1981, SAC received a new air refueling tanker aircraft to supplement the aging KC-135 Stratotanker force. Based on the McDonnell Douglas DC-10 commercial airliner, the KC-10A Extender was deployed equipped with improved military avionics, aerial refueling, and satellite communications equipment. That same year, President Ronald Reagan reversed the 1977 Carter administration decision regarding the B-1, directing that 100 examples of a refined version of the aircraft, now designated the B-1B Lancer, be procured as a long-range combat aircraft for SAC. The LGM-118A Peacekeeper ICBM reached SAC in 1986, and the 114 Peacekeepers had a total warhead yield of about 342 megatons. This also served to offset the retirement of the obsolescent and maintenance-intensive LGM-25C Titan II ICBM, the last example of which was deactivated in May 1987. An additional underground "16,000 square-foot, two-story reinforced concrete" command post for HQ SAC was also constructed at Offutt AFB from 1986 to 1989 from a design by Leo A. Daly, who had designed the adjoining 1957 bunker. The first Rockwell B-1B Lancer was also delivered to SAC in 1987. On 22 November 1988, the Northrop Grumman B-2 Spirit, under development as the Advanced Technology Bomber (ATB), a so-called "black program" since 1979, was officially acknowledged and rolled out for the first time for public display. The first "stealth bomber" designed for SAC, the aircraft made its first flight in May 1989.

== End of the Cold War and Operation Desert Storm ==
SAC reorganization at the end of the Cold War began as early as 1988 when the Carlucci Commission planned the closure of:

- Mather Air Force Base, California, an ATC undergraduate navigator training (UNT) base which hosted a tenant SAC B-52G / KC-135E bomb wing and a SAC-gained AFRES KC-135A air refueling group; and
- Pease Air Force Base, New Hampshire, a SAC base with an FB-111A and KC-135E bomb wing and a SAC-gained ANG KC-135A air refueling wing

The closures were the beginning of a post-Cold War process that would later become known as Base Realignment and Closure or BRAC. Although Mather AFB's navigator training mission would relocate to Randolph AFB, Texas, the Mather B-52G bomber/KC-135A tanker wing would inactivate and the AFRES KC-135 tanker group would relocate to nearby McClellan AFB, relocating again four years later to Beale AFB when another BRAC process would close McClellan AFB. Concurrently, the Pease AFB bomber/tanker wing would lose its FB-111 aircraft and transfer to Whiteman AFB, Missouri in preparation for transition to the B-2 Spirit while a portion of Pease would be transferred to the New Hampshire Air National Guard for its ANG KC-135 air refueling wing and be renamed Pease Air National Guard Base.

Additional closures and divestments of SAC bases would continue throughout the late 1980s and early 1990s, accelerating even more so as a result the START I Treaty's mandated elimination of both the entire B-52G fleet and the inactivation of all Minuteman II and Peacekeeper ICBMs, as well as the 1992 reorganization of the Air Force that disestablished SAC and dispersed its assets to other new or existing MAJCOMs, primarily ACC and AMC. In addition to closures of Mather AFB and Pease AFB, this would eventually include the following subsequent closure and realignment actions, primarily due to BRAC:

- Altus AFB (tenant SAC presence disestablished and transferred to AMC, later AETC)
- Barksdale AFB (transferred to ACC, now AFGSC)
- Beale AFB (transferred to ACC)
- Carswell AFB (transferred to USN as NAS JRB Fort Worth per BRAC)
  - AFRES (later AFRC) HQ 10th Air Force, an ACC-gained AF Reserve fighter wing, and an AMC-gained ANG airlift wing remain
- Castle AFB (closed by BRAC)
- Dyess AFB (transferred to ACC, now AFGSC)
- Eaker AFB (closed by BRAC)
- Ellsworth AFB (transferred to ACC, now AFGSC)
- Fairchild AFB (transferred to AMC)
- F. E. Warren AFB (transferred to ACC, then AFSPC, now AFGSC)
- Grand Forks AFB (transferred to AMC, now ACC)
- Griffiss AFB (closed by BRAC)
  - AFMC Rome Air Development Center and ANG Northeast Air Defense Sector HQ remain
- Grissom AFB (transferred to AFRC as Grissom ARB)
- K. I. Sawyer AFB (closed by BRAC)
- Loring AFB (closed by BRAC)
- Malmstrom AFB (transferred to AMC, then AFSPC, now AFGSC)
- March AFB (transferred to AFRC as March ARB per BRAC)
- McConnell AFB (transferred to AMC)
- Minot AFB (transferred to ACC, now AFGSC)
- Offutt AFB (transferred to ACC)
- Plattsburgh AFB (closed by BRAC)
- Robins AFB (tenant Regular AF SAC presence disestablished; base remains an AFMC installation with ACC and ACC-gained ANG flying wings)
- Seymour Johnson AFB (TAC base transferred to ACC; tenant SAC presence disestablished and SAC-gained tenant AF Reserve presence transferred to AFRC, now gained by AMC)
- Whiteman AFB (transferred to ACC, now AFGSC)
- Wurtsmith AFB (closed by BRAC)

On 1 July 1989, the 1st Combat Evaluation Group reporting directly to SAC headquarters was split with most HQ 1CEVG organizations transferring to SAC HQ (e.g., the Command Instrument Flight Division) and RBS personnel, equipment, and radar stations becoming the 1st Electronic Combat Range Group. Airborne NEACP alerts ended in 1990 and during 1991's Operation Desert Storm to liberate Kuwait from Iraqi invasion and occupation, SAC bomber, tanker and reconnaissance aircraft flew operations (e.g., B-52s with conventional bombs and conventional warhead AGM-86 ALCMs) near Iraq from bases in Great Britain, Turkey, Cyprus, Diego Garcia, Saudi Arabia, and the United Arab Emirates. Following Operation Desert Storm, the dissolution of the Warsaw Pact and the de facto end of the Cold War, President George H. W. Bush and Secretary of Defense Dick Cheney directed SAC to take all bomber and refueling aircraft and Minuteman II ICBMs off of continuous nuclear alert on 27 September 1991 and placing said aircraft on quick reaction ground alert.

== Disestablishment ==
The 31 May 1992 major reorganization of the USAF organizational structure subsequently disestablished SAC, moving its bomber, reconnaissance and aerial command post aircraft and all SAC ICBMs, along with all Tactical Air Command aircraft, to the newly established Air Combat Command (ACC). The newly established Air Mobility Command (AMC) inherited most of SAC's KC-135 Stratotanker aircraft and the entire KC-10 Extender aerial refueling tanker force, while some KC-135s were reassigned directly to USAFE and PACAF, with one additional air refueling wing assigned to the Air Education and Training Command (AETC) as the KC-135 formal training unit. Land-based ICBMs were later transferred from ACC to Air Force Space Command (AFSPC), while manned bombers remained in ACC. USAF nuclear forces in ACC and AFSPC were then combined with the United States Navy's Fleet Ballistic Missile submarine forces to form the United States Strategic Command (USSTRATCOM), which took over the SAC Headquarters complex at Offutt AFB. In 2009, the entire land-based USAF ICBM force and that portion of the USAF manned bomber force that was still nuclear-capable, e.g., the B-2 Spirit and B-52 Stratofortress, was transferred to the newly established Air Force Global Strike Command (AFGSC), while the B-1 Lancer conventional bomber force remained in ACC. In 2015, these B-1 units were also transferred to Air Force Global Strike Command, which assumed responsibility for all current and future USAF bomber forces.

== Culture and legacy ==
The Strategic Air Command left a lasting cultural impact in addition to its military legacy. The most prominent slogan associated with SAC is the official motto, “Peace Is Our Profession.” This phrase captured the command's role in maintaining peace through deterrence during the Cold War. Another unofficial slogan became part of SAC lore: “To err is human; to forgive is not SAC policy.” This saying reflected the high standards and strict discipline within SAC, where precision and accountability were paramount due to the critical nature of its mission. Additional, unofficial slogans include "Peace Through Strength" and "Peace Through Superior Firepower".

== Commemoration and new commands ==
The SAC Museum located adjacent to Offutt AFB was moved in 1998 to a site near Ashland, Nebraska and renamed as the Strategic Air and Space Museum in 2001. Organizations commemorating SAC include the Strategic Air Command Veterans Association, the SAC Society, the B-47 Stratojet Association, the B-52 Stratofortress Association, the FB-111 Association, the SAC Airborne Command Control Association, the Association of Air Force Missileers, the SAC Elite Guard Association and the Strategic Air Command Memorial Amateur Radio Club. After the Cold War, SAC histories included a 1990 almanac and a 2006 organizational history.

In 2009, the Air Force Global Strike Command (AFGSC) was activated with the lineage of Strategic Air Command. AFGSC, headquartered at Barksdale AFB, Louisiana, is one of two USAF component commands assigned to United States Strategic Command (USSTRATCOM). AFGSC currently consists of Eighth Air Force (8AF), responsible for the nuclear-capable manned heavy bomber force, and Twentieth Air Force (20AF), responsible for the ICBM force.

== Lineage ==
- Established as Continental Air Forces on 13 December 1944

Redesignated: Strategic Air Command on 21 March 1946

- Replaced as a specified command by a new unified combatant command, United States Strategic Command (USSTRATCOM), on 1 June 1992; concurrently disestablished as a USAF major command (MAJCOM) same date

Components

- Second Air Force: 21 Mar 1946 (from CAF) – 30 Mar 1946; 1 Nov 1949 – 1 Jan 1975
- Eighth Air Force: 7 Jun 1946 – 1 Jun 1992
- Fifteenth Air Force: 31 Mar 1946 – 1 Jun 1992
- Sixteenth Air Force: 1 Jul 1957 – 15 Apr 1966
- IX Troop Carrier Command: 21 Mar 1946 (from CAF) – 31 Mar 1946

Air Divisions

- 1st Air Division (later, 1st Missile Division; 1 Strategic Aerospace Division): 15 Apr 1955 – 20 May 1956; 1 Jan 1958 – 1 Sep 1988
- 3d Air Division: 18 Jun 1954 – 1 Apr 1970; 1 Jan 1975 – 31 Jan 1982
- 5th Air Division: 14 Jan 1951 – 1 Jul 1957
- 7th Air Division: 20 Mar 1951 – 30 Jun 1965; 1 Jul 1978 – 31 Jan 1982
- 21st Air Division: 16 Feb 1951 – 8 Apr 1952; 8 Apr – 16 Jul 1952
- 42d Air Division: 2 Mar 1951 – 8 Jan 1958; 15 Jul 1959 – 9 Jul 1991
- 58th Air Division: 1 Mar – 16 Oct 1948
- 311th Air Division: 31 Mar 1947 – 1 Nov 1949.

Overseas components

Strategic Air Command in the United Kingdom was among the command's largest overseas concentrations of forces, with additional forces under SAC's 16th Air Force at air bases in North Africa, Spain and Turkey during the 1950s and 1960s.

SAC "Provisional" wings were also located in Kadena AB, Okinawa and U-Tapao Royal Thai Navy Airfield / U-Tapao AB, Thailand during the Vietnam War

SAC also maintained bomber, tanker, and/or reconnaissance aircraft assets at the former Ramey AFB, Puerto Rico in the 1950s, 1960s and 1970s, and at Andersen AFB, Guam; RAF Mildenhall, RAF Fairford and RAF Alconbury in the United Kingdom; Moron AB, Spain; Lajes Field, Azores (Portugal); Diego Garcia, BIOT; and the former NAS Keflavik, Iceland through the 1990s.

SAC also conducted operations from RAF Fairford, RAF Alconbury and RAF Mildenhall in the United Kingdom, Moron AB in Spain, Lajes Field in the Azores (Portugal), RAF Akrotiri in Cyprus, Incirlik AB in Turkey, Diego Garcia in the British Indian Ocean Territory, and from multiple air bases in Egypt, Saudi Arabia, Oman, and the United Arab Emirates during the first Gulf War (Operations Desert Shield and Desert Storm) from 1990 to 1991.

== See also ==
- List of commanders-in-chief of the Strategic Air Command
