= 99th Range Group =

- Active: 1954-2001
- Country: United States
- Branch: United States Air Force
- Role: Military simulation
- Motto(s): Combat Evaluation

Insignia
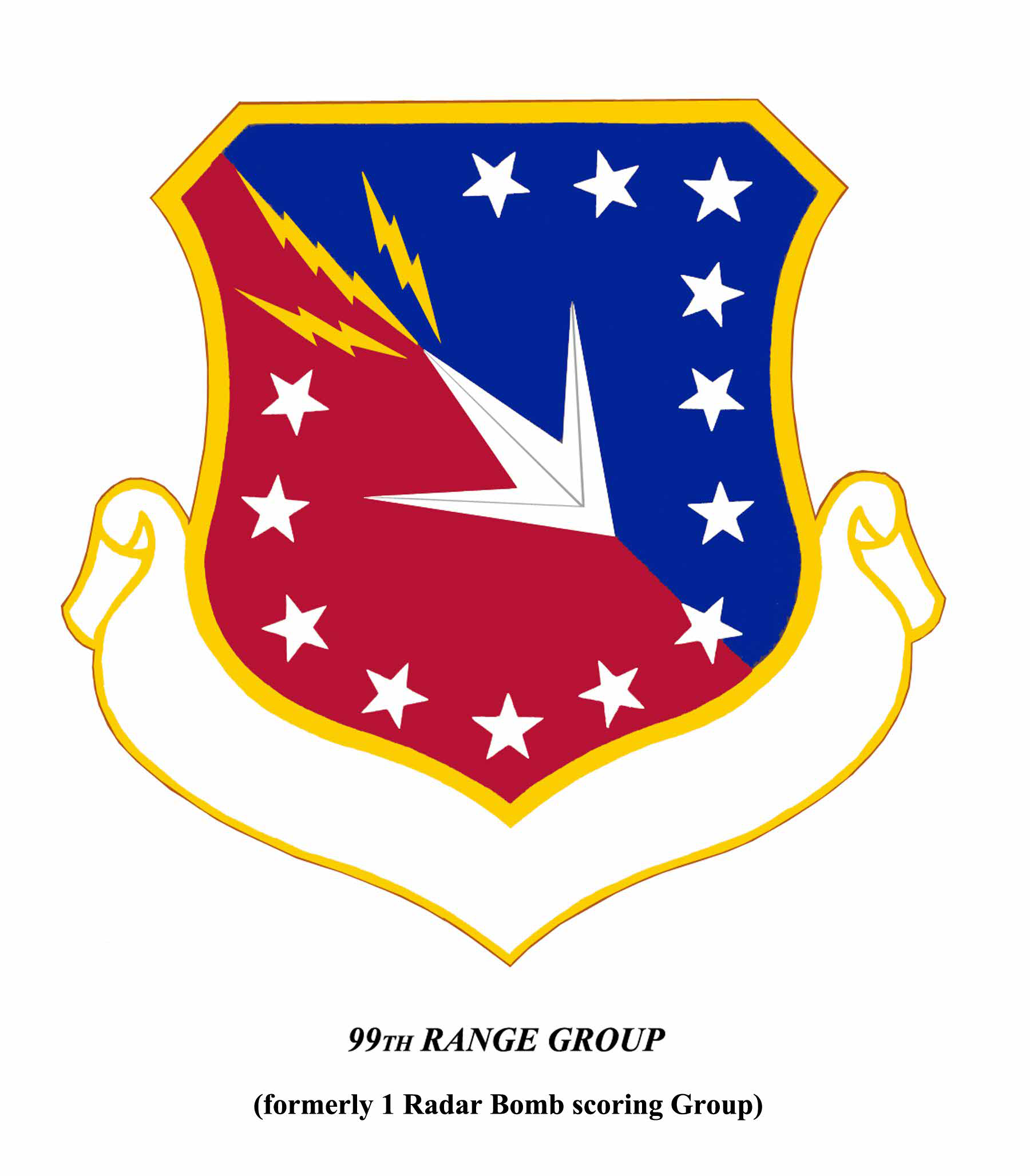
- 99th Range Group emblem (Note: Approved 27 November 1989.)

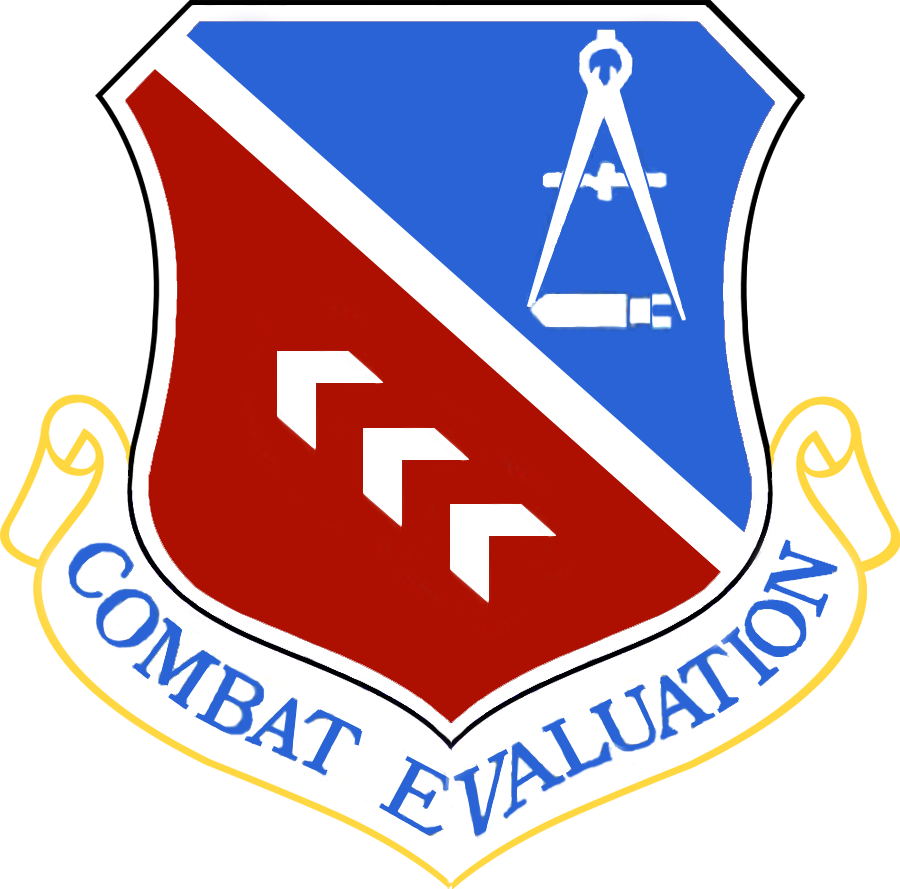
- 1st Combat Evaluation Group emblem (Note: Approved 12 June 1958.)

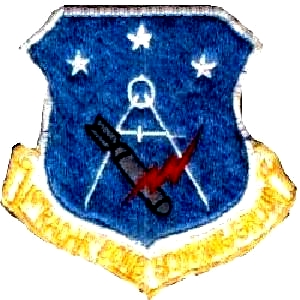
- 1st Radar Bomb Scoring Group emblem

The 99th Range Group is an inactive United States Air Force (USAF) unit. It was last stationed at Nellis AFB, Nevada, where it was responsible for the Nevada Test and Training Range (NTTR).

== 1945 RBS unit ==
After the Colorado Springs Tent Camp gained the 1946 Fifteenth Air Force headquarters for bomber operations, including Radar Bomb Scoring (RBS), "Colorado Springs" had the 206th Army Air Force Base Unit (RBS) organized on 6 June 1945 and which initially controlled RBS detachments at Kansas City and Fort Worth Army Airfield. From August to 8 March 1946, as the 63rd AAFBU, the headquarters was at Mitchel Field on Long Island, New York, and after returning to Colorado Springs, was renamed the 263rd AAFBU. The 263rd, after transferring from 15th AF to directly under Strategic Air Command, was redesignated the 3903rd Radar Bomb Scoring Squadron (SAC) effective on 1 August 1948and by 25 August 1949, the 3903rd RBSS controlled the nearby "Denver Bomb Plot" RBS detachment.

== 1951 RBS group ==
The 15th AF HQ departed the 1949 Ent Air Force Base for March AFB and the 3903rd went to Carswell Air Force Base and became a group in 1951. The 1st Radar Bomb Scoring Group was activated in 1954 and assumed the 3903d Radar Bomb Scoring Group mission.

== 1961 division ==
On 1 August 1961 the 3908th Strategic Standardization Group that provided command level standardization/evaluation of SAC aircrews merged with the 1st Radar Bomb Scoring Group, with the 1CEVG Radar Bomb Scoring Division acquiring the previous RBS Group's personnel, electronic equipment, and mission. 1CEVG RBS personnel managed Combat Skyspot operations during the Vietnam War.

== 1989 range group ==
The personnel and the assets of the Radar Bomb Scoring Division became the 1st Electronic Combat Range Group on 1 July 1989 when the 1CEVG was split, and other 1CEVG organizations transferred to SAC headquarters. 1 CEVG/Det. 2 was moved from Wall, SD to Holbrook, AZ in 1968. We were up and running around the middle of April. ...1990 when we became 99 ECRG/DET 2. The last RBS/ECM sortie was on or about 13 September 1993. The last ECM-only sortie was on or about 30 September 1993. A Rockwell B-1B from Dyess (not positive) flew the last RBS/ECM mission. A C-130 from Hulburt Field flew the last ECM mission. The period of time between 1 October 1993, and Christmas was used for decommissioning the systems.

The 1st ECRG then became the 99th Electronic Combat Range Group in 1992 when USAF required subordinate groups to carry the same number as their parent wings. In October 1995, the group moved to Nellis Air Force Base, Nevada and was redesignated the 99th Range Group. There it assumed the mission of managing the Nevada Test and Training Range. To perform this mission it was assigned two subordinate squadrons, the 99th Range Squadron and 99th Range Support Squadron. It continued this task until its mission was transferred to its parent, the 99th Air Base Wing.

== Lineage ==
- Constituted as the 1st Radar Bomb Scoring Group on 9 June 1954
- Activated on 10 August 1954

Redesignated 1st Combat Evaluation Group on 1 August 1961
Redesignated 1st Electronic Combat Range Group on 1 July 1989
Redesignated 99 Electronic Combat Range Group on 1 August 1992
Redesignated 99 Range Group on 1 October 1995
Inactivated on 7 February 2000

=== Assignments ===
- Strategic Air Command, 10 Aug 1954
- 99th Strategic Weapons Wing (later 99th Tactics and Training Wing, 99th Wing, 99th Air Base Wing), 10 August 1989 - 7 February 2000

=== Subordinate Units ===
Squadrons

- 10th Radar Bomb Scoring Squadron, 10 August 1954 – 19 September 1966
- 11th Radar Bomb Scoring Squadron, 10 August 1954 – 19 September 1966
- 12th Radar Bomb Scoring Squadron, 10 August 1954 – 19 September 1966
- 99th Range Squadron, 1 October 1995 – 7 February 2000
- 99th Range Support Squadron, 1 October 1995 - 7 February 2000

Flight

- 10th SHORAN Beacon Flight, 10 August 1954 - 25 July 1966

=== Stations ===
- Carswell Air Force Base, Texas, 10 August 1954
- Barksdale Air Force Base, Louisiana, 24 July 1961
- Nellis Air Force Base, Nevada, 1 October 1995 - 7 February 2000
