= Ashland Radar Station =

Coordinates: 46°36′15.23″N 68°24′51.44″W

Ashland Radar Station was a United States Air Force station located in Ashland, Maine operational from around 1975 to 1990. Sitting on 6.59 acres (2.67 ha).

== History ==
The station was constructed in August 1975 along route "IR-800", which was designated in 1981. Detachment 7 moved southwest to the new Ashland Radar Station south of Ashland, Maine. The Ashland Strategic Training Range eventually included an AN/MPS-T1 and Multiple Threat Emitter System (MUTES) and in 1985, Det 7 was awarded the Combat Skyspot trophy. It was closed in 1994 at the end of the Cold War.
