= Statesboro Bomb Scoring Site =

Coordinates: 32°29′N 81°45′W

External images
- radar station
- radomes of AN MPQ T2A radar antennas

The Statesboro Bomb Scoring Site was a Strategic Air Command (SAC) Radar Bomb Scoring AUTOTRACK radar station. It was Formerly Used Defense Site I04GA0575. Detachment 3 of the 10th Radar Bomb Scoring Squadron had begun "Statesboro Bomb Plot" operations by June 1963.

In addition to a Reeves AN/MSQ-39 Bomb Scoring Central with Fresnel antenna, during the Vietnam War the station used a Soviet T2A radar with 2 radomes for simulating surface-to-air missile tracking to train/exercise aircraft crews in electronic countermeasures (electronic warfare).
