= Lowry Bombing and Gunnery Range =

Colorado World War II / Cold War military facility

The Lowry Bombing and Gunnery Range (LBGR) was a World War II and Cold War facility that included 4 of the 6 HGM-25A Titan I missile launch complexes southeast of Denver, Colorado.

== Army Air Force range ==
The area of the Lowry range was initially part of the 1937 Buckley Field's 102.4 sq mi (265 km^{2}) that became an Army Airfield in 1942. In World War II, bombing with "practice and HE bombs", training in "fixed and flexible gunnery", and rifle training were conducted at the range. The 1st of the Army Air Forces Bombardier Schools was at Lowry from July 1940 through March 14, 1941, used the Buckley range and graduated 3 instructor classes of graduates who opened the bombardier school at Barksdale Field.

Camp Bizerte at the range was a World War II training facility for simulating an overseas Army field camp. Part of the 12-week AAF Photography Course at Lowry Field in 1943 was conducted at Camp Bizerte.

Lowry Bombing and Gunnery Range was designated after the "Tech-Division Air Training Command" on September 20, 1946, transferred 93.5 sq mi (242 km^{2}) to the custody of Lowry Field, and the 9800th Technical Service Unit cleared the 1st site at LBGR--1,920 acres (3.00 sq mi)—of munitions, and the site was certified along with the "BT1" site as clear on November 16, 1948. Post-war the west end of LBGR was used as an explosives demolition site.

The "Air-to-Ground Bombing and Gunnery Mission" at LBGR terminated in 1956, and RBS by the redesignated (1955) Detachment 1, 11th RBS Sq, continued until it moved to the former La Junta Army Airfield (La Junta Bomb Plot, 1959-1990). In 1963, a portion of LBGR (Lowry Missile Site No. 1) had been "cleared of surface MEC"—munitions and explosives of concern). From 1960 and 1980, ~63,600 acres (99.4 sq mi) of the LBGR were transferred to various other state and federal agencies and private owners.

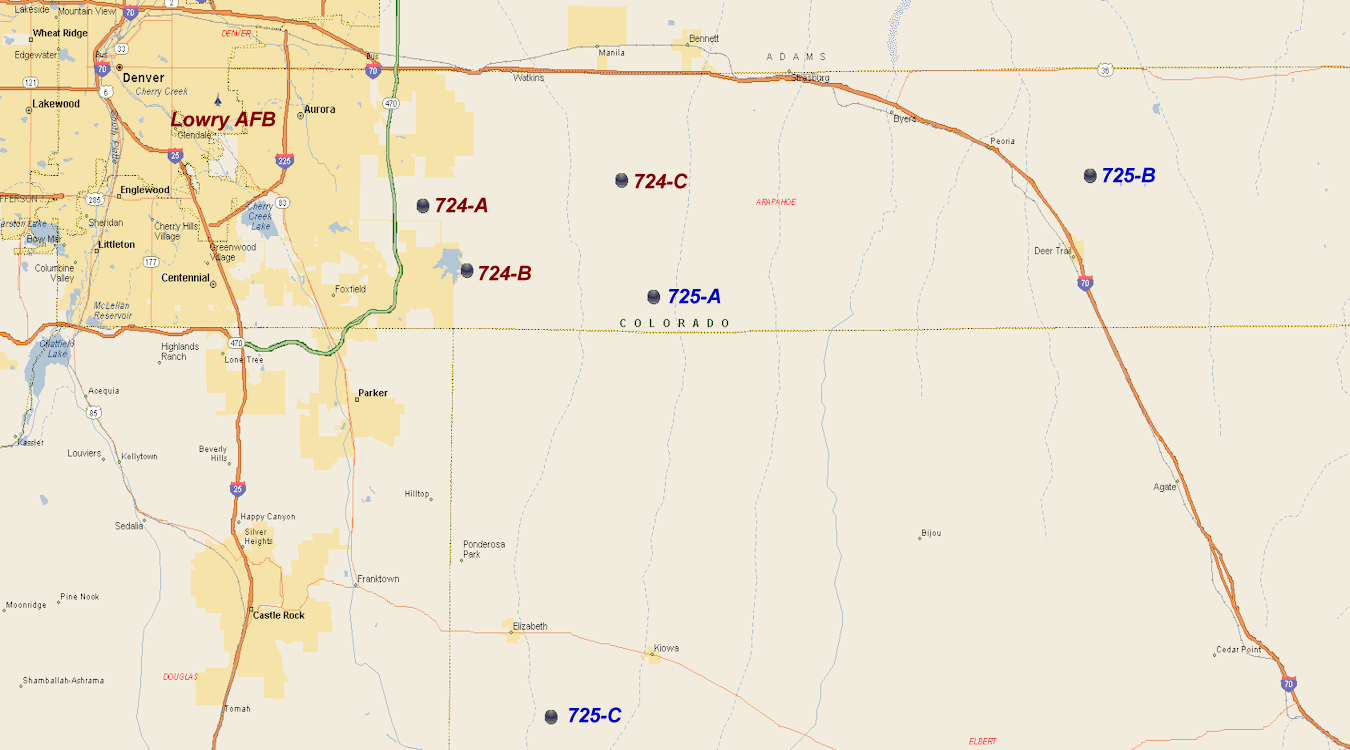
Of the 6 missile complexes near Denver, the 725th Strategic Missile Squadron's -B and -C complexes were not within the area of the Lowry Bombing and Gunnery Range. The urban regions (yellow) are shown in their 21st century size, not the actual area when the approximate 18 Titan missiles were constructed and operational (1958-1965).

== Missile complexes ==
Lowry Missile Site No. 1 ("Lowry Air Force Missile Site" before being renamed in 1960) of 85.1 sq mi (220 km^{2}) included a large portion of the LBGR and began in September 1958 with the start of construction prior to excavation for the eventual 4 complexes (1 off of LBGR,--additional Site No. 2 also had a complex on the former range). Construction on the 1st operational complex, Titan I Missile Complex 1A, began in April 1959, mining excavation of 1/2 million cubic yards of rock was completed by 4 June 1961, and the site was finished in December 1961 (the dedication was on April 18, 1962). Complex 1A was on 442.42 acres (179.04 ha) with ~36 acres (15 ha) "bounded by a chain-link fence". Missiles were assembled at the Glenn L. Martin plant southwest of Denver (the co-located test site with 4 stands had been transferred to the Air Force), and Lowry AFB's 724th Strategic Missile Squadron (April 26, 1961 – June 25, 1965) commanded the Site No. 1 complexes. Site No. 1 was adjacent to the Lowry Landfill on the west and Complex 1A was privatized on January 31, 1969.

In January 1964 the Secretary of Defense informed congress the Titan 1 bases would be closed in 1965, and the last Lowry missile was taken off alert status March 26, 1965 (all Titan 1s were in storage by April 18). (Titan 1s were stored at Mira Loma Air Force Station, California, until being scrapped in Spring 1966.) Titan I Missile Complex 2A on the former LBGR was transferred to the Department of the Army on October 12, 1977.

=== Denver area complexes ===
A total of six missile complex sites operated in the Denver area from 1960 – 1965.

On the Lowry Bombing and Gunnery Range

724-A, SW of Watkins, Colorado 39°38′52.57″N 104°41′24.54″W
724-B, SSW of Watkins, Colorado 39°36′16.89″N 104°34′46.64″W
724-C, S of Bennett, Colorado 39°39′55.30″N 104°29′34.58″W
725-A, 14 miles SE of Watkins, Colorado 39°35′15″N 104°27′42″W

Outside the LBGR

725-B, 4 miles NNE of Deer Trail, Colorado 39°40′06″N 104°01′41″W
725-C, 5 miles SSE of Elisabeth, Colorado 39°18′54″N 104°33′43″W

== Lowry Training Annex ==
In 1969, Lowry Training Annex adjacent to the former LBGR area was established after the Department of the Navy transferred ~3,700 acres (5.8 sq mi) to the U.S. Air Force (the Navy had nearby land as early as July 30, 1948, and used the bombing range in 1952 for training).

== Bennett Army National Guard facility ==
The Bennett Army National Guard facility of 242 acres (0.378 sq mi) at the former Complex 2A (southeast corner of LBGR) was a Colorado Army National Guard military installation used for training. In 2006 the Bennett facility was excessed by the government and was the "last federal property transferred" of the former Lowry Bombing and Gunnery Range.

In 2012, oil was struck on the Former Lowry Bombing and Gunnery Range.
