= Matador Automatic Radar Control =

AN/MPS-19 Performance
- Frequency: 2700-2900 MHz (S-band) with 3 mc bandwidth
- PRF: 200 pulses/second
- Beamwidth: 3° beam
- Pulsewidth: 0.8 microseconds
- RPM: 30 cycles/second feedhorn rotation →20 pulses/cycle conical scan signal
- Diameter: 8 ft reflector
- Power: 137-250 Kw (1mW PEP)

Matador Automatic Radar Control (MARC) was a command guidance system for the Martin MGM-1 Matador ground launched cruise missile that used combination radar/computer/communication centrals ("Q" systems) for ground-directed bombing. As for the earlier ground central used with the X-10 aircraft,* MARC had an "Air Link" from the ground for control and an airborne AN/APW-11A radar transponder on the missile for ranging. A series of "MSQ sites", each with a mobile AN/MSQ-1A control set in 3 vans had an automatic tracking radar to geolocate the Matador up to ~600 nmi (690 mi; 1,100 km). MARC provided command guidance during the "mid-course phase" after Matador/MARC contact was established following the missile launch off the Zero Length Launcher and until an MSQ transmitted the dive ("dump") command to start the flight path toward the target. Originating in the Caltech/Martin "ZEL Project" and developed as part of weapon system "Project MX 771" at the "Air Force Missile Test Center, Cocoa, Florida"; MARC had accuracy at "crossover into enemy territory" of ~500 ft (150 m) guidance, and at an AN/MSQ-1A range of 165 nautical miles (190 mi; 306 km)–a CEP of 2,700 ft (820 m).

== Description ==
The AN/MSQ-1A was developed by the Reeves Instrument Corporation. Missile was by the Glenn L. Martin Company. Company included the AN/MPS-19 automatic tracking radar and an alternating current analog OA-626 plotting computer/board vice the DC computer of the preceding AN/MSQ-1 Close Support Control Set with AN/MPS-9 & OA-132 plotting computer/board manufactured for Korean War bombing (cf. AN/MSQ-2 also developed by Rome Air Development Center with MPS-9 & DC OA-215.) The AN/MPS-19 was a variant of the radar used in the Western Electric M-33 Antiaircraft Fire Control System that achieved a longer MARC range via circuitry for receiving the beacon return from an airborne transponder. Instead of, or in addition to, Matador Automatic Radar Control, the last Matador variant (TM-61C) added SHANICLE passive radio guidance.

=== Mid-course guidance ===
MARC guided the Matador to the dive point (or to the "SHANICLE hyperbolic zone") by a directional control signal to the Matador "spoilers" for momentarily deflecting wing airflow to slightly redirect the course of the missile. The OA-626 computed both the missile's course and the direction of the desired destination from the missile position, and the MARC repeated spoiler signals to reduce the difference. For MARC-commanded dives, an initial point was used as a preliminary destination to ensure the Matador subsequently had the necessary general direction of flight for the dive toward the target. During the final cruise prior to the dive, MARC continually predicted the dive point based on any variations of missile velocity measured by the MPS-19–as well as the corresponding nominal time and displacement expected during the upcoming dive When the Matador was acceptably near the "point predicted by the MARC", the dump command was initiated and the missile was self-controlled during the "semi-ballistic transonic dive" with zero lift to the detonation point near the target. A similar Vietnam War successor that instead predicted a bomb release point by computing a free-fall bomb trajectory was the 1965 AN/MSQ-77 Bomb Directing Central and its variants.

=== Radar stations ===
The 1st AN/MSQ-1A was at "Site Rose" next to Patrick Air Force Base hangars in 1956, and MARC maintenance training had begun at Orlando Air Force Base by 1957. Numerous overseas MARC radar stations downrange of the various Matador launch sites included the Germany tactical air-direction posts ("TDPs") such as the Operating Location (OL) of the 601st Tactical Control Squadron (a training site was at Bann, near Ramstein):

- OL 1: Koteburg
- OL 2:
- OL 3: Rothwesten (July – December 1955) and Adenan (July 1955 – December 1958)
- OL 4:
- OL 5: Mausdorf
- OL 6: Celle Air Base
- OL 7: Wunstorf
- OL 8: Birkenfeld (January 1957 – December 1958)
- OL 9: Alzey northeast of Sembach Air Base (call sign Retouch)
- OL 10: Northeast of Hamm (callsign Hacksaw)
- OL 11: Erbeskopf (July 1958 – December 1958)
- OL 12: Winterberg (July – December 1955)

The TAC Control Squadron crews were repeatedly exercised by "Quick Reaction Alert" using T-33 Shooting Star aircraft to simulate the planned Matador flight paths, and the T-33 became evident during the exercise when the radar operator observed the aircraft transponder returning "two blips on the same Scan" instead of 1 as with an actual Matador in flight. During "Annual Missile Launch Operations", Matador units from Germany at Wheelus Air Base in Libya conducted test firings until after the phase-out of the Matador began in 1959 (the TM-61C Matador was retired on September 25, 1962.)

== Subsequent uses ==
AN/MSQ-1A centrals were subsequently used for other missions such as measuring the location of sensor aircraft during nuclear tests, e.g. 1962 F-100F Super Sabre "Small Boy" testing, on Tarawa atoll for Operation Argus, during Operation Teapot at the Nevada Proving Ground and for ranges at Tyndall AFB, Fallon Range Training Complex, and the Tonopah Test Range. Radar stations using the MSQ-1A for Radar Bomb Scoring included the Hawthorne Bomb Plot and a Korea military installation that also provided command guidance of C-47s.

Until equipped with the N-6 inertial navigation system, the various North American RTV-A-5/X-10 research drones for the Navaho missile program carried AN/APW-11 radar transponder avionics for tracking by a ground radar to allow–during the autopilot's "automatic stable flight"–command guidance by radio control via an AN/ARW-56 airborne receiver that processed commands from the AN/ARW-55 transmitter at the radar station.
