= Lubkin =

Lubkin is a surname. It may be a transliteration of Russian surnames Лубкин, Любкин. The latter one may also be transliterated as Lyubkin Notable people with the surname include:

- Aleksandr Lubkin (1770-1815), Russian philosopher, logician; professor at Kazan University
- Gloria Lubkin
- Samuel Lubkin
- Vladimir Lubkin or Vladimirs Lubkins, Soviet and Latvian hockey player
