= AN/MPQ-2 =

The AN/MPQ-2 Close Cooperation Control Unit was a truck-mounted automatic tracking radar/computer/communication system ("Q" system) for aircraft command guidance, e.g., missile tracking, and for Radar Bomb Scoring. It was introduced shortly after the end of World War II. For ground directed bombing (GDB), an operator would manually plot a target on the "Blind Bombing Plotting Sheet", then use the manual "E6B computer and bombing tables" to plot the release point for striking the target, after which a radar operator used the AN/MPQ-2 to acquire a track of the bomber near an initial point during which allowed ground control of the bomb run to the release point.

Based on the World War II SCR-584 radar developed by MIT and which was used for the "SCR-584-M missile control Receiver and beacon", the MPQ-2 included an "RC-294 Plotter" and its analog computer for converting radar range, azimuth, and elevation to cartesian coordinates, as well as a plotting board for drawing the aircraft track. The AN/MPQ-2 was the basis for the Rome Air Development Center's AN/MSQ-1 & -2 Close Support Control Sets also used in the Korean War, and the MSQ-1A was used for command guidance of the Matador missile.

In accordance with the Joint Electronics Type Designation System (JETDS), the "AN/MPQ-2" designation represents the second design of an Army-Navy electronic device for ground mobile radar combination equipment. The JETDS system also now is used to name all Department of Defense electronic systems.

== Locations ==
Radar Bomb Scoring detachments of the Colorado Springs' 206th Army Air Force Base Unit (organized on June 6, 1945) used MPQ-2s at Kansas City and Fort Worth Army Airfield and in 1946, the 4th launch of a V-2 at White Sands Proving Ground (1946) was tracked by two MPQ-2s. In addition to the CONUS RBS detachments (e.g., Detachments C, K, & N), Detachment 23's AN/MPQ-2 was at the Heston Radar Bomb Scoring Site on November 10, 1950, and after deployment to the Korean War, the three AN/MPQ-2 radars of the 3903rd Radar Bomb Scoring Group RBS detachments were transferred in January 1951 under the operational control of the 502nd Tactical Control Group. The MPQ-2 guided Martin B-26 Marauders against enemy positions in front of the 25th Infantry Division." On February 23, 1951, the 1st Boeing B-29 Superfortress mission controlled by an MPQ-2 was flown.

== See also ==
- List of radars
- List of military electronics of the United States
