= AN/MSQ-1 =

Cold War-era aircraft command guidance system

The AN/MSQ-1 Close Support Control Set, produced by Reeves Instrument Corporation, was a trailer-mounted combination radar/computer/communication system for command guidance of manned aircraft. It was developed under a Rome Air Development Center program office (AN/MPS-9 radar & OA-215). The system directed aircraft equipped with AN/APS-11A or AN/APW-11 avionics (e.g. Martin B-26 Marauder bombers) and was used during the Korean War for ground-directed bombing. The MSQ-1 was subsequently used for nuclear testing during Operation Teapot, and for aircraft tests such as controlled pinpoint photography using the RB-57A Canberra in 1954.

In accordance with the Joint Electronics Type Designation System (JETDS), the "AN/MSQ-1" designation represents the first design of an Army-Navy electronic device for ground mobile special combination equipment. The JETDS system also now is used to name all Department of Defense electronic systems.

The set originally had a Reeves Instrument Corporation direct current analog computer. It was later modified to use an alternating current computer for the Matador Automatic Radar Control (MARC) to guide MGM-1 Matadors and other unmanned aerial vehicles. The MSQ-1 was considered for guidance of the XQ-5 target drone in 1957.

US Air Force MSQ-1A units were carried aboard the USS Tarawa (CV-40) and the USS Neosho (AO-143) to track Lockheed X-17s launched during the Operation Argus nuclear tests.

== Radar stations ==
In addition to the Tadpole radar stations of the Korean War, a downrange AN/MSQ-1 for the Atlantic Missile Range had been at Florida's Jupiter Missile Guidance Annex in 1952, and an MSQ-1 radar station on the United States Gulf Coast for the RB-57A tests.

== See also ==
- List of radars
- List of military electronics of the United States
- Joint Electronics Type Designation System – Unclassified designation system for United States military electronic equipment
