= REAC =

REAC may refer to a number of different things:

- REAC, the common abbreviation for the Reeves Electronic Analog Computer, a series of early computers produced by Reeves Instrument Corporation
- Rákospalotai EAC, a Hungarian football club whose name is often abbreviated as REAC
