= Accounting machine =

An accounting machine, or bookkeeping machine or recording-adder, was generally a calculator and printer combination tailored for a specific commercial activity such as billing, payroll, or ledger. Accounting machines were widespread from the early 1900s to 1980s, but were rendered obsolete by the availability of low-cost computers such as the IBM PC.

This type of machine is generally distinct from unit record equipment (some unit record tabulating machines were also called "accounting machines").

== List of vendors/accounting machines ==
- Burroughs Corporation:
  - Burroughs Sensimatic
  - Burroughs Sensitronic
  - Burroughs B80
  - Burroughs E103
  - Burroughs Computer F2000
  - Burroughs L500
  - Burroughs E1400 Electronic Computing/Accounting Machine with Magnetic Striped Ledger
- Dalton Adding Machine Company
- Electronics Corporation of America:
  - Magnefile-B
  - Magnefile-D
- Elliott-Fisher
- Federal Adding Machines
- IBM:
  - IBM 632
  - IBM 858 Cardatype Accounting Machine
  - IBM 6400 Series
- Laboratory for Electronics:
  - The Inventory Machine II (TIM-II)
- Monroe Calculator Company:
  - Model 200
  - Synchro-Monroe President
  - Monrobot IX
- NCR Corporation:
  - Post-Tronic Bookkeeping Machine - Class 29
  - Compu-Tronic Accounting Machine
  - Accounting Machine - Class 33
  - Window Posting Machine - Class 42
- Olivetti:
  - General Bookkeeping Machine (GBM)
- J. B. Rea Company:
  - READIX, c. 1955
- Sundstrand Adding Machines
- Underwood:
  - ELECOM 50 "The First Electronic Accounting Machine"
  - ELECOM 125, 125 FP (File Processor), 1956

== See also ==
- Unit record equipment
