= Project Cyclone =

R & D on missile systems

Project Cyclone was a 20-year initiative of the US Office of Naval Research that lasted from 1946 to the mid-1960s. It was one of a series of projects whose purpose was to develop a computer laboratory with a company in the private sector that would do research and development on missile systems, as well as on classified problems in navigation, ballistics, engine control, electrical circuit analysis, and other fields. A secondary motivation was to strengthen the US's connections with civilian scientists and technology companies that had developed during WWII.

Project Cyclone was a partnership with Reeves Instrument Corporation. There were two sister projects: Project Whirlwind, which was a partnership with the Massachusetts Institute of Technology to build a digital computer (resulting in the Whirlwind I), and Project Typhoon, which was a partnership to build an analog computer with RCA.

The project led to the development of the original Reeves Electronic Analog Computer (or "REAC"), as well as subsequent models. Under the auspices of Project Cyclone, Reeves personnel would also be responsible for operating competitors' hardware in the lab, such as the ELECOM 100, produced by Electronic Computer Corporation. This was generally done to test the results of the Reeves-built machines in the lab.

The offices of the project were originally located on the premises of Reeves Instrument Corporation in New York, but by the 1950s the project had expanded such that it required three separate computer laboratories. The largest Project Cyclone lab contained 13 full REAC machines.

Project Cyclone, jointly with Reeves, was the organizer of multiple symposiums on analog computers. The first one was held in March 1951 in NYC, and was attended by 141 visitors from elite engineering organizations all over the world, such as the Applied Physics Laboratory and the Jet Propulsion Laboratory. The proceedings of these symposia were published under the title "Project Cyclone Symposium on REAC Techniques".
