= Data processing machine =

Data processing machine may refer to:

- Component or equipment used as part of a Data processing system
- Accounting machine
- Tabulating machine
- Computer, in certain legal contexts
