= IBM Electric =

Electric typewriter

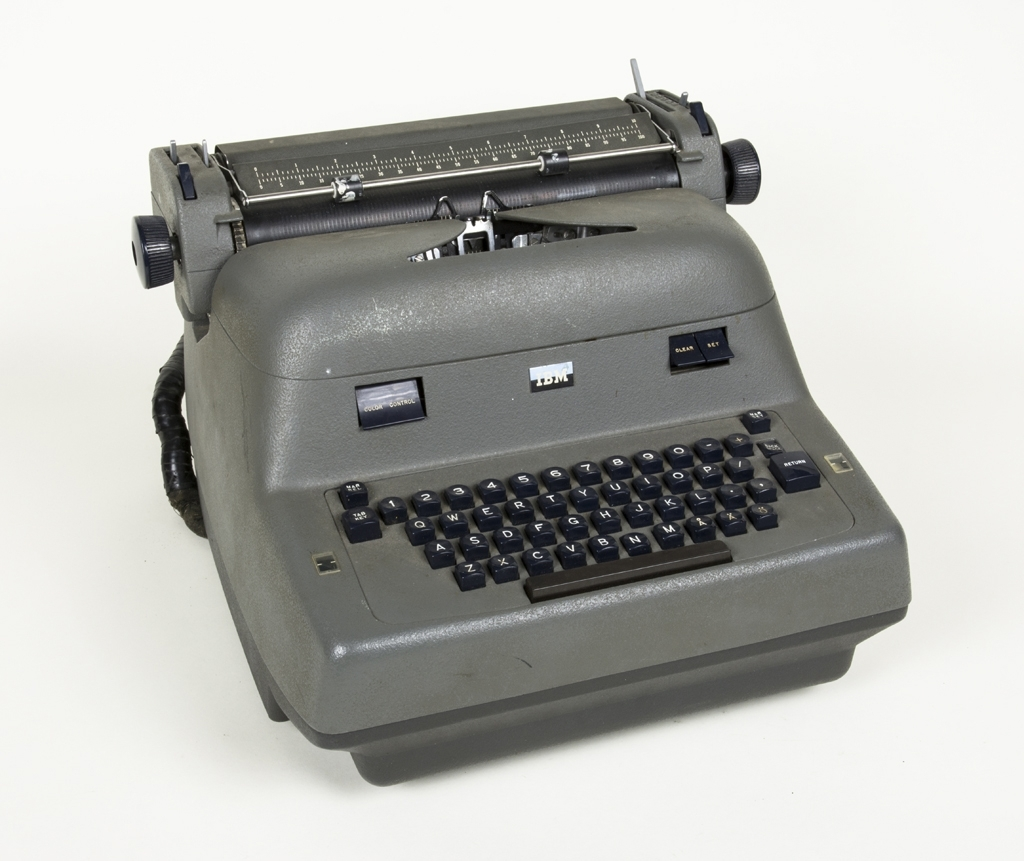
- IBM Model A typewriter (non-Executive version)
- Manufacturer: International Business Machines Corporation (IBM)
- Released: 1935; 91 years ago
- Predecessor: Remington model 12 with Electromatic Typewriter mechanism
- Successor: IBM Selectric typewriter

The IBM Electric were an early series of electric typewriters that IBM manufactured, starting in the mid-1930s. They used the conventional moving carriage and typebar mechanism, as opposed to the fixed carriage and type ball used in the IBM Selectric, introduced in 1961. After 1944, each model came in both "Standard" and "Executive" versions, the latter featuring proportional spacing.

== History ==
The IBM Electromatic typewriter was the first electric typewriter to enjoy long-term commercial success. Unlike the later IBM Selectric typewriter, this typewriter model used a conventional moving carriage and typebar mechanism.

The history of the Electromatic goes back to 1924, when the North East Electric Company received patent rights for the power roller from James Smathers. At that time, the company was selling electric motors, and wanted to get into the typewriter business. They reached an arrangement with Remington, securing a contract for 2,500 machines in 1925. N. E. Electric manufactured the motor and power-roller base. The typewriter portion was made by Remington, based on its model Number 12. Remington had to do little more than attach its typewriter to the base.

All the units manufactured sold quickly and Remington wanted to continue the relationship. According to Darryl Rehr, in his 1997 book, "Antique Typewriters & Office Collectibles", Remington claimed, "... they could sell as many as N.E. Electric could produce." The insistence of N.E. Electric on a contract, however, came at a time when Remington was unable to make such a commitment, so the Remington Electric went out of production.

The N. E. Electric Company then developed and produced the Electromatic, placing it on the market in 1929. After passing through the hands of General Motors, it became The Electromatic Typewriter Co.

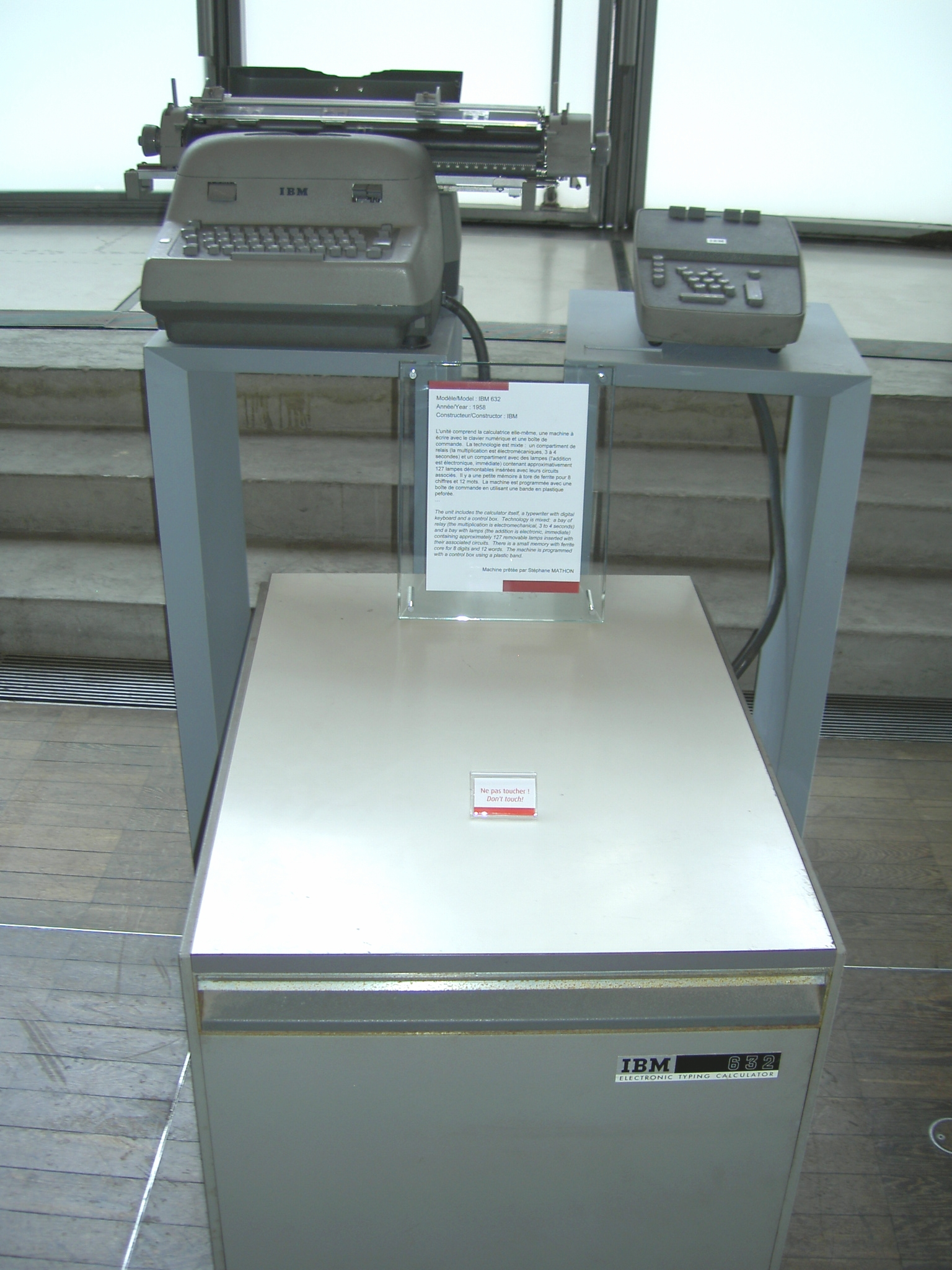
IBM 632 Accounting Machine with a modified, wide-carriage IBM Electric typewriter used as a printer

IBM acquired the assets of Electromatic Typewriters, Inc., of Rochester, N.Y. in 1933 and invested $1 million in redesigning their product and setting up service centers. The new IBM's Model 01 was introduced in 1935 and became the first successful electric typewriter in the U.S., according to IBM. Major model introductions included:

Picture	Model	Year	Ref
	IBM Model 01	1935	
	IBM Model A	1949	
	IBM Model B	1954	
	IBM Model C	1959	
	IBM Model D	1967	

In the 1950s, modified standard versions of the A, B, and C models were used as console typewriters or terminals on many early computers (e.g., JOHNNIAC, IBM 1620, PDP-1). The IBM Selectric typewriter, introduced in 1961, was easier to interface to a computer and was favored in new designs, such as the IBM 1130 computer and the IBM 1050 terminal.

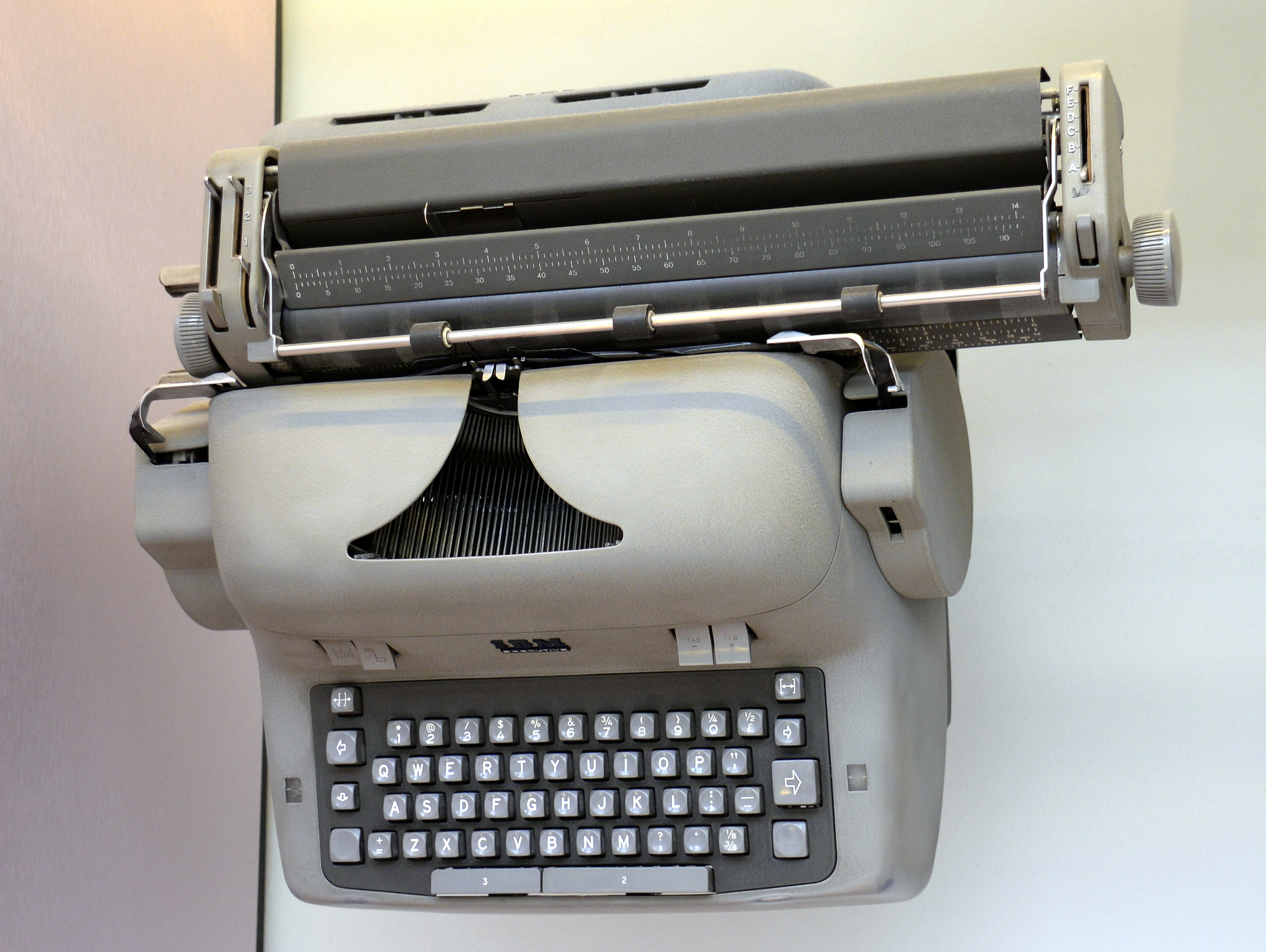
Executive electric typewriter with bold-face type and dull grey crackle finish. IBM Model B, 1957. National Museum of Scotland, Edinburgh.

== Executive ==
IBM announced proportional letter spacing for typewriters in 1941, but IBM's World War II effort delayed the introduction of a typewriter model, the Executive, with this capability until 1944. Standard typewriters have a fixed letter pitch, so, for example the letter "i" occupies the same space as the letter "m". The Executive model differed in having a multiple escapement mechanism and four widths for characters, allowing it to simulate 12 point 'ragged right' typesetting. A skilled typist, by carefully counting letters on each line, could even produce fully justified layouts on the Executive.

According to Darren Wershler-Henry:

In 1944, IBM launched the Executive, a proportionally spaced typewriter. Characters on the Executive typewriter occupied between two and five units per grid cell, depending on the width of the letter. Beeching relates an anecdote that demonstrates the significance of this achievement. The proportionally spaced typewriter immediately leaped to the apex of the world bureaucracy and administrative culture when President Roosevelt was presented with the first machine off the line. The Armistice documents that ended World War Two were typed on an IBM, as was the original United Nations Charter. To a world accustomed to monospaced typewritten documents, a page of typewriting produced with an Executive...was indistinguishable from a page of typeset text. Prime Minister Churchill allegedly responded to Roosevelt that "although he realized their correspondence was very important, there was absolutely no need to have it printed".

The fonts available for the IBM Executive typewriters helped to convey the impression of typeset text. Fonts on monospaced typewriters usually have very wide serifs on narrow letters such as "i" so that they visually fill the same horizontal space as letters such as "m" and "w". So that these letters do not look out of place, most of the others are given strong serifs as well. Along with the constant spacing, these serifs give a distinctive "typewriter look" to documents. With proportional spacing, the IBM Executive typewriters could abandon the wide serifs and use fonts that closely resembled those used in typesetting.

IBM's Executive typewriters introduced a feature lacking in many mechanical typewriters: the top row included the digits "one" and "zero"; other typewriters generally omitted these. The IBM design obviated substitutions taught by many typing instructors: the letter "o" or "O" for "zero", and lowercase "l" for "one". These substitutions were easily identified when compared to an adjacent line typed with the digit keys. Worse, digits in columns of typed numbers would not have lined up properly on the Executive if the typist used the letter substitutions. A full set of dedicated digit keys allowed the Executive's digits to all be the same width as each other, so that a typed figure of a given number of digits was always the same total width, regardless of what the digits were. This change also allowed IBM greater flexibility in font design, as the lowercase "l" and uppercase "o" did not have to be usable as the corresponding digits. Having introduced them on the Executive, IBM maintained the separate digit keys on later non-proportional-spacing typewriter models, including the Selectric series.
