= Reeves Electronic Analog Computer =

Series of mainframe computer models

REAC
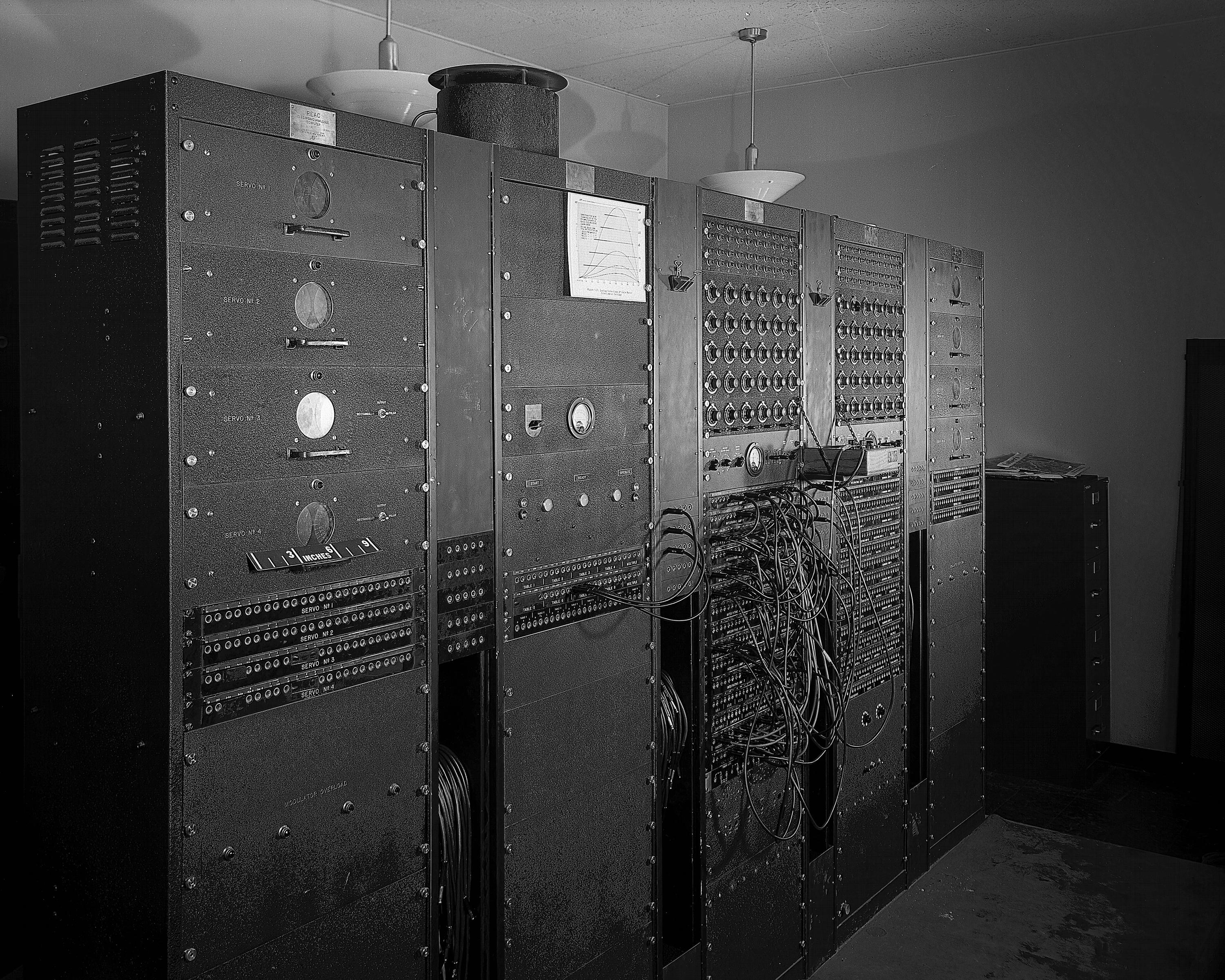
- REAC 100 owned by NASA
- Manufacturer: Reeves Instrument Corporation
- Released: 1946; 80 years ago
- Discontinued: 1965

The Reeves Electronic Analog Computer (commonly shortened REAC) was a family of early analog computers produced in the United States by Reeves Instrument Corporation from the 1940s through the 1960s.

== History ==
=== Origins ===
In the 1940s, Reeves Instrument Corporation began developing ideas for a digital computation machine. They hired mathematician Samuel Lubkin, of the original team who designed the UNIVAC, to lead the project. The original proposal was to build a machine called the REEVAC, which was to have been based on the design of the EDVAC machine, which Lubkin had also done design work on. For unknown reasons, Reeves decided to scrap this approach, and Lubkin left the company for a job with the National Bureau of Standards (the US government organization later renamed the National Institute of Standards and Technology).

Reeves then decided to move forward with an analogue computer instead. In 1946, the Office of Naval Research launched a project code named Project Cyclone at Reeves to develop a general purpose analogue computing machine to further Naval objectives — it is unclear if this was the cause of Reeves's change of direction or a consequence. This was the beginning of a 20-year partnership between Reeves and the Navy. For the entire 20-year duration of Project Cyclone, Reeves would continually furnish the Navy with the most recent REAC model.

=== Commercial production ===
In 1948, Reeves began putting the REAC machine into commercial production. The original price was US$14,320 for the machine itself, but fully loaded with all the necessary peripherals it cost US$37,000 (about US$425,000 in 2021 dollars). By 1951, there were more than sixty REAC machines in use at universities, private (usually engineering) companies, and government and military institutions. Today the REAC is credited with proving that a general-purpose analog computer could be a viable commercial product.

Notable early adopters included the following:

- Naval Air Missile Test Center (now the Pacific Missile Test Center)
- United States Naval Research Laboratory
- RAND Corporation
- North American Aviation
- Applied Physics Laboratory
- University of Minnesota
- Ames Research Center at NASA

=== Uses ===
REAC computers played a role in the development of many military projects, such as the Ryan X-13 Vertijet. A REAC was the first computer at Naval Air Weapons Station China Lake, and was instrumental in running simulations in development of the first anti-radiation missile. It also was used in the Aeronautical Computer Laboratory at Naval Air Warfare Center Warminster.

== Hardware ==
The machine as it arrived from the manufacturer consisted of several cabinets with connecting cables, and was described as "essentially an Erector Set whose pieces are electronic or electro-mechanical parts."

The average runtime for single problem was about one minute.

== Models ==
There were seven models produced during the life of the system:

- REAC 100 (1947)
- REAC 200 (1952)
- REAC 300 (1953)
- REAC 400 (1956)
- REAC 500 (1963)
- REAC 550 (1964)
- REAC 600 (1965)
