= Lou Everett =

American test pilot

W.L. "Lou" Everett
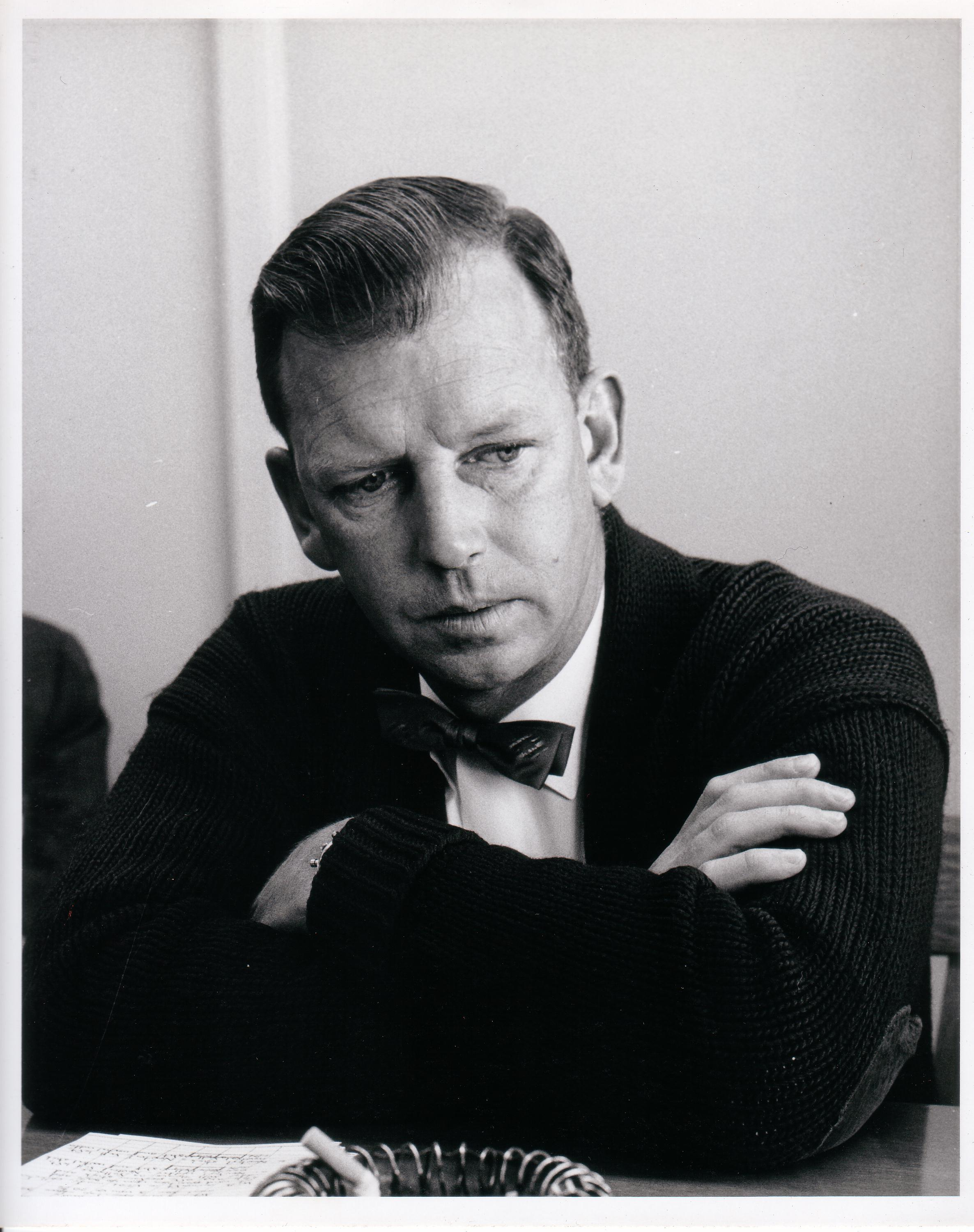
- Born: November 28, 1924; Brooklyn, New York
- Died: April 27, 1965 (aged 40); Edwards Air Force Base, Lancaster, California
- Cause of death: Experimental aircraft accident
- Resting place: Fort Rosecrans National Cemetery, San Diego, California
- Aviation career
- First flight: Ryan Flex-Wing - May 23, 1961; XV-5A - May 15, 1964

W. L. "Lou" Everett (November 28, 1924 – April 27, 1965) was a United States Army Air Corps fighter pilot and test pilot.

== Early life ==
Lou Everett was born on November 28, 1924, in Brooklyn, New York. He graduated from high school at seventeen during World War II, and wanted to fly fighter aircraft for the United States Navy. Because he was too young for the Navy Cadet program, he enlisted in the Army. Within a few months, he transferred to the United States Army Air Corps and began training as a fighter pilot assigned to fly the P-51 Mustang. Stationed in Florida, he was awaiting assignment to go overseas when the war ended.

Everett joined the Mississippi Air National Guard, attended Millsaps College, and continued to fly by crop dusting and instructing at a local air school. While attending Millsaps, he married Betty June Coleman and soon after the couple moved to Starkville, Mississippi, where Lou enrolled in the Aero Physics Department at Mississippi State University. In December 1950, the Mississippi Air National Guard was called to active duty because of the Korean War. Shortly thereafter, Everett was called to serve in Korea, where he flew AT-6 Texans on forward air control missions.

== Test pilot career ==
Everett returned to the United States to resume his education at Mississippi State. He graduated in 1954 with a degree in Aeronautical Engineering and joined Chance-Vought in California as an engineer. In 1955, he was hired by Ryan Aeronautical Company as their second test pilot for the X-13 Vertijet, joining Ryan’s Chief Test Pilot, Pete Girard. The X-13 was the world’s first pure jet VTOL aircraft, and Girard and Everett were the only pilots to fly it. As a result of their research work on the X-13, the two men received awards from the New York Academy of Sciences. During this time, Everett became one of the original 17 members of the Society of Experimental Test Pilots.

During the test phase of Ryan’s VZ-3 Vertiplane, Girard resigned from test piloting, and Everett became Ryan’s Chief Engineering Experimental Test Pilot. He continued testing the Vertiplane and began testing (a maiden flight: May 23, 1961; Flight magazine) the Flex-Wing; a Rogallo-wing aircraft which evolved into the XV-8 Fleep. On May 23, 1961, flying the Flex-Wing, he became the first man to leave the ground in a powered Rogallo.

The next project was the XV-5 Vertifan, jointly developed by Ryan and General Electric, and first flown by Everett. The Vertifan employed the lift fan concept to achieve vertical flight, diverting jet thrust to spin louvered fans in the wings and nose. On April 27, 1965, the two Vertifan prototypes made their public debut during a press demonstration at Edwards. One was to fly horizontally in front of the grandstand, while the other would convert from horizontal to vertical flight and descend. Everett was in the plane scheduled to descend. Flying at 180 knots (330 km/h; 210 mph) and an altitude of 800 feet (240 m), he prepared to transition from conventional to fan mode, but the Vertifan unexpectedly pitched nose down. Everett radioed "I've got to get out!" and ejected, but the ejection seat failed and his parachute caught on the plane’s high tail. He went down with the plane and was killed.
