= IBM 6400 Accounting Machine =

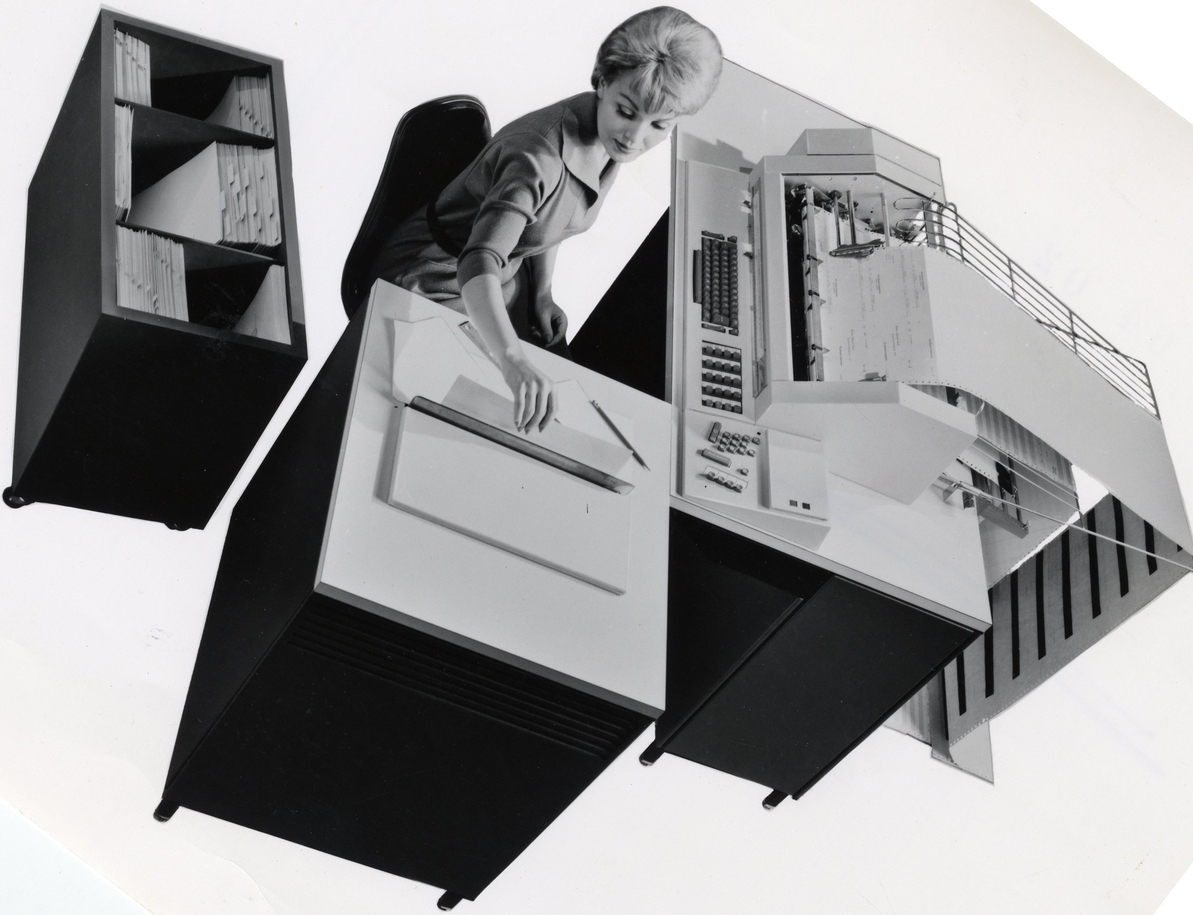
IBM 6400

The IBM 6400 Accounting Machine is a series of four calculating and accounting machines produced by the IBM Electric Typewriter (ET) division in 1962. It was announced in January 1963 and was sold to perform what IBM referred to as BICARSA, which stood for billing, inventory control, accounts receivable and sales analysis.

== Characteristics ==
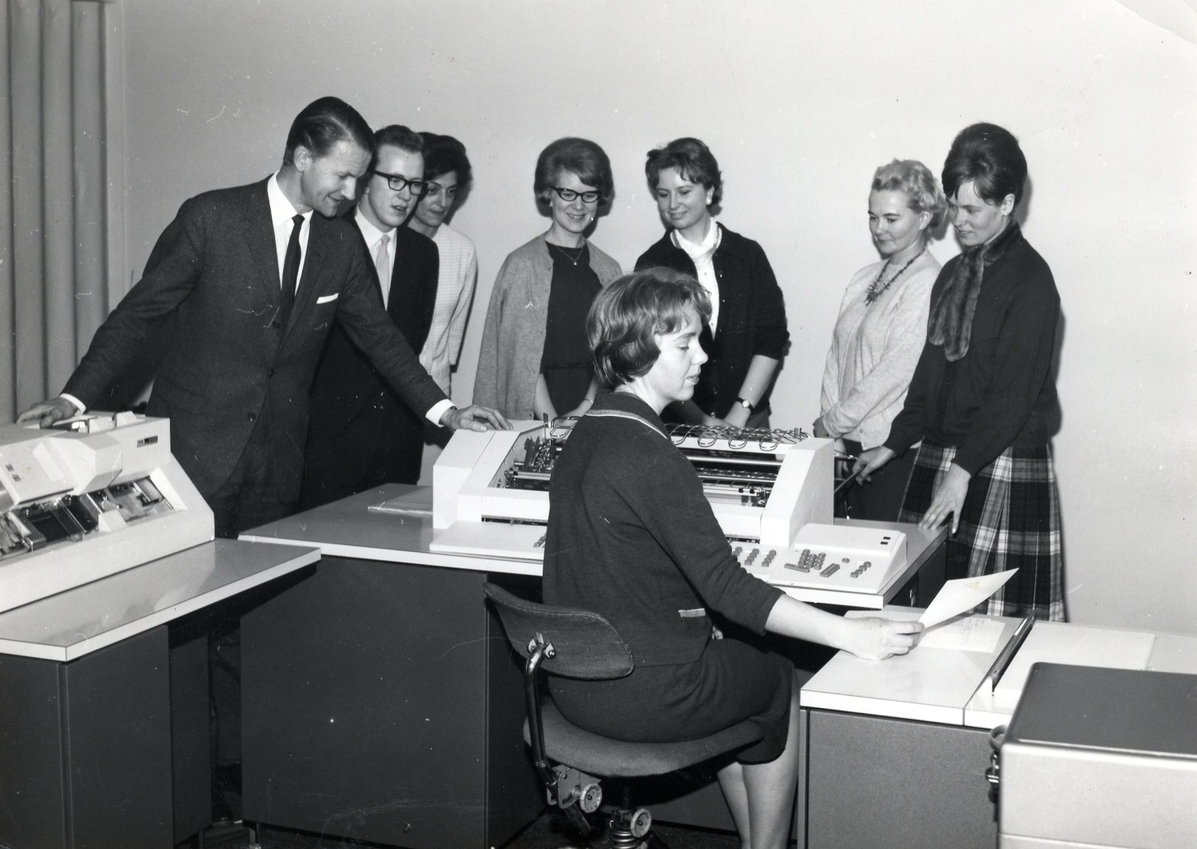
IBM 6400 demonstration

The output for each machine is facilitated using a keyboardless IBM Selectric typewriter mounted above the CPU. Programming is done by a control panel. Calculations are done by electronics (SMS) and program steps are controlled by relays.

Optional input/output devices include a card reader and punch, a paper tape reader and punch, and a magnetic card reader.

The magnetic card reader uses large cards (30 cm x 35 cm) where the front of the card is used as a printer ledger while the same information is stored on a 2.5 cm (0.98 in) 4-track magnetic strip (that IBM describes as magnetic tape) that runs across the bottom of the back of the card. IBM advertising at the time said: "You read one side. The IBM 6400 reads the other." The magnetic tape can be read or written in 0.5 seconds and can store 252 alphanumeric characters.

== Components ==
The IBM 6405 is a desk-size calculator, and the 6410, 6420, and 6430 are more advanced accounting machines.

The 6400 System consists of the following hardware:

- 6405: Accounting Machine
- 6410: Accounting Machine
  - A 6410 weighs 750 lb (340 kg) and occupies an area of 77 sq ft (7.2 m^{2}).
  - With an optional 6426 it weighs 1,000 lb (450 kg) and occupies an area of 89 sq ft (8.3 m^{2}).
  - The monthly rental was US$495, purchase price was US$23,600.
- 6420: Accounting Machine.
  - This was also referred to as the 6420 Magnetic Ledger Accounting Machine and was sold with a 6425
  - A 6420 weighs 1,000 lb (450 kg) and occupies an area of 86 sq ft (8.0 m^{2})
  - With an optional 6426 it weighs 1,250 lb (570 kg) and occupies an area of 98 sq ft (9.1 m^{2}).
  - The monthly rental was $520, purchase price was $24,300
- 6430: Accounting Machine
- 6422: Automatic Ledger Feed
- 6424: Card Punch
  - The monthly rental was $90, purchase price was $4,075
- 6425: Magnetic Ledger Unit
  - The monthly rental was $175, purchase price was $8,300
- 6426: Card Punch
  - The monthly rental was $115, purchase price was $5,175
- 6428: Card Reader
- 6454: Paper Tape Reader
- 6455: Paper Tape Punch

== Development and manufacturing ==
The 6405, 6410, and 6420 were developed by IBM in Lexington, Kentucky, United States. Manufacturing was done by IBM Lexington and by IBM in Don Mills, Ontario, Canada. In 1966 all work was transferred to Don Mills.

In 1968 an IBM 6430 was developed in Don Mills. The programming was done on cards and the programs steps were controlled by electronics (SMS).

== Sales history ==
IBM initially launched a major sales campaign including print, TV and radio advertising. They received what they considered to be an acceptable number of orders and deliveries began in mid 1963. However the IBM ET sales representatives soon found that programming the IBM 6400 (which involved wiring plug board panels), was far more complex than initially anticipated. It took 425 hours to fully program the first machine installed at a commercial client in New York. Given that ET sales representatives at that time were responsible for installing the machines they sold (which typically only involved unboxing typewriters), this meant that the product cost far more to install than was planned, as additional system engineers had to be hired and trained to support the install effort.

Responsibility for the IBM 6400 (along with the IBM 632) was moved to the IBM Data Processing Division (DPD) in 1964. However given their focus on launching the System/360 at that time, the product was not heavily promoted after this.

IBM withdrew all 6400 System Hardware from marketing on March 1, 1976. They discontinued rentals and maintenance on Feb 28, 1983.
