= Fay Ajzenberg-Selove =

American nuclear physicist

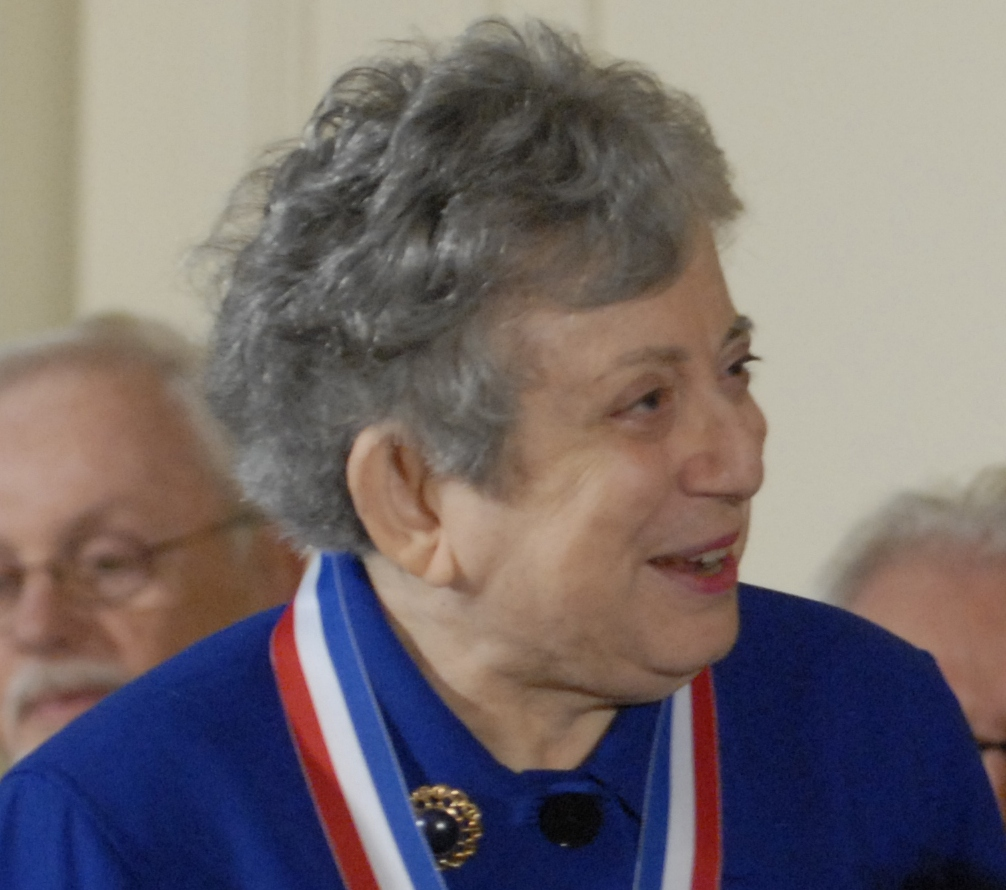
- Fay Ajzenberg-Selove receiving the National Medal of Science in 2008
- Born: February 13, 1926; Berlin, Germany
- Died: August 8, 2012 (aged 86); Haverford, Pennsylvania, U.S.
- Education: University of Michigan; University of Wisconsin
- Known for: Nuclear spectroscopy
- Spouse: Walter Selove m. 1955
- Scientific career
- Fields: Nuclear physics
- Workplaces: Haverford College; University of Pennsylvania
- Doctoral advisor: Hugh Richards
- Notable students: Gloria Lubkin (MA, Boston University, 1957)

Fay Ajzenberg-Selove (February 13, 1926 – August 8, 2012) was an American nuclear physicist. She was known for her experimental work in nuclear spectroscopy of light elements, and for her annual reviews of the energy levels of light atomic nuclei. She was a recipient of the 2007 National Medal of Science.

== Early life and education ==
She was born Fay Ajzenberg on 13 February 1926 in Berlin, Germany to a Polish Jewish family from the Russian Empire. Her father, Moisei Abramovich Aisenberg (Polish: Mojzesz Ajzenberg), was a mining engineer who studied at the St. Petersburg School of Mines and her mother, Olga Ajzenberg née Naiditch, was a pianist and mezzo-soprano who studied at the St. Petersburg Academy of Music. In 1919, they fled the Russian Revolution and settled in Germany, where her father became a wealthy investment banker.

They were bankrupted by the Great Depression, so the family moved to France in 1930. Her father worked as a chemical engineer in a sugar beet factory owned by her uncle Isaac Naiditch in Lieusaint, Seine-et-Marne, France. Ajzenberg attended the Lycée Victor Duruy in Paris and Le Collège Sévigné. In 1940, the family fled Paris prior to the Nazi invasion of France. They took a tortuous route through Spain, Portugal, the Dominican Republic, and Cuba before they settled in New York City in April 1941.

Ajzenberg graduated from Julia Richman High School in 1943. Her father had encouraged her interest in engineering. She attended the University of Michigan, where she was friends with Haitian president "Papa Doc" Duvalier. She graduated in 1946 with a BS in engineering, the only woman in a class of 100. After briefly doing graduate work in physics at Columbia University and teaching at the University of Illinois at Navy Pier, she began doctoral studies at the University of Wisconsin–Madison.

At Wisconsin she worked with nuclear physicist Hugh Richards who was studying nuclear reaction energies and classifying the energy levels of light atoms. She found a method of creating ^{6}Li targets by converting the sulphate to a chloride and electroplating it to the target. She also demonstrated that the excited states of the ^{10}B nucleus were not evenly spaced as previously thought. She received her MS in 1949 and her PhD in physics in 1952 with a dissertation titled "Energy levels of some light nuclei and their classification." She was an atheist.

== Physics career ==
She did postdoctoral work with Thomas Lauritsen at the California Institute of Technology. Together they would publish Energy Levels of Light Nuclei, a compilation of the field's best yearly research regarding nuclear structure and decay of nuclei with an atomic mass number A from 5 to 20. Since 1973 Ajzenberg published them herself. Eventually Ajzenberg would publish 26 of these papers, primarily in the journal Nuclear Physics, until 1990. They have been called "the nuclear scientists' bible."

Following graduation, Ajzenberg was a lecturer at Smith College and a visiting fellow at the Massachusetts Institute of Technology. She was hired as an assistant professor of physics at Boston University, but the dean lowered her salary 15 percent when he learned Ajzenberg was a woman. Ajzenberg refused the position until the initial salary was restored.

While at Boston University, she met Harvard University physicist Walter Selove and they married in December 1955. One of her graduate students was Gloria Lubkin, who graduated in 1957 with an MA in Nuclear Physics, and would later become the first female editor in chief of Physics Today. In 2013, Lubkin wrote Ajzenberg's obituary as her final story for the magazine. In 1962, using the bubble chamber at the Brookhaven National Laboratory, Selove discovered a meson he named the fayon (f_{2}) after her. Ajzenberg-Selove and her husband were honored with a symposium about their work at the University of Pennsylvania in 2005. Selove died in 2010.

In the 1960s, she worked at Haverford College, where she was the first full-time female faculty member. In 1970, Ajzenberg-Selove began teaching at the University of Pennsylvania, where Selove had taught since 1957. In 1972, she applied for one of three tenured positions there. She was not hired; the reasons cited were age and "inadequate research publications". Ajzenberg-Selove was only 46, had a citation count higher than everyone in the physics department except for Nobel laureate J. Robert Schrieffer, and was Nuclear Physics Section chair of the American Physical Society. She filed complaints with the Equal Employment Opportunity Commission and the Pennsylvania Human Relations Commission and in 1973 the University of Pennsylvania was ordered to give her a tenured professorship. She became only the second female professor in the university's School of Arts and Sciences.

== Publications ==
In 1994, she published a memoir, A Matter of Choices: Memoirs of a Female Physicist.

== Honors and awards ==
- Fellow, American Association for the Advancement of Science
- Fellow, American Physical Society
- Chair, American Physical Society Division of Nuclear Physics (1973–1974)
- Award for Distinguished Teaching, Christian and Mary Lindbeck Foundation (1991)
- Nicholson Medal for Humanitarian Service, American Physical Society (1999)
- Distinguished Alumni Fellow Award, University of Wisconsin Department of Physics (2001)
- National Medal of Science (2007)
