= Ryan X-13 Vertijet =

Experimental vertical take-off and landing (VTOL) jet aircraft

X-13 Vertijet
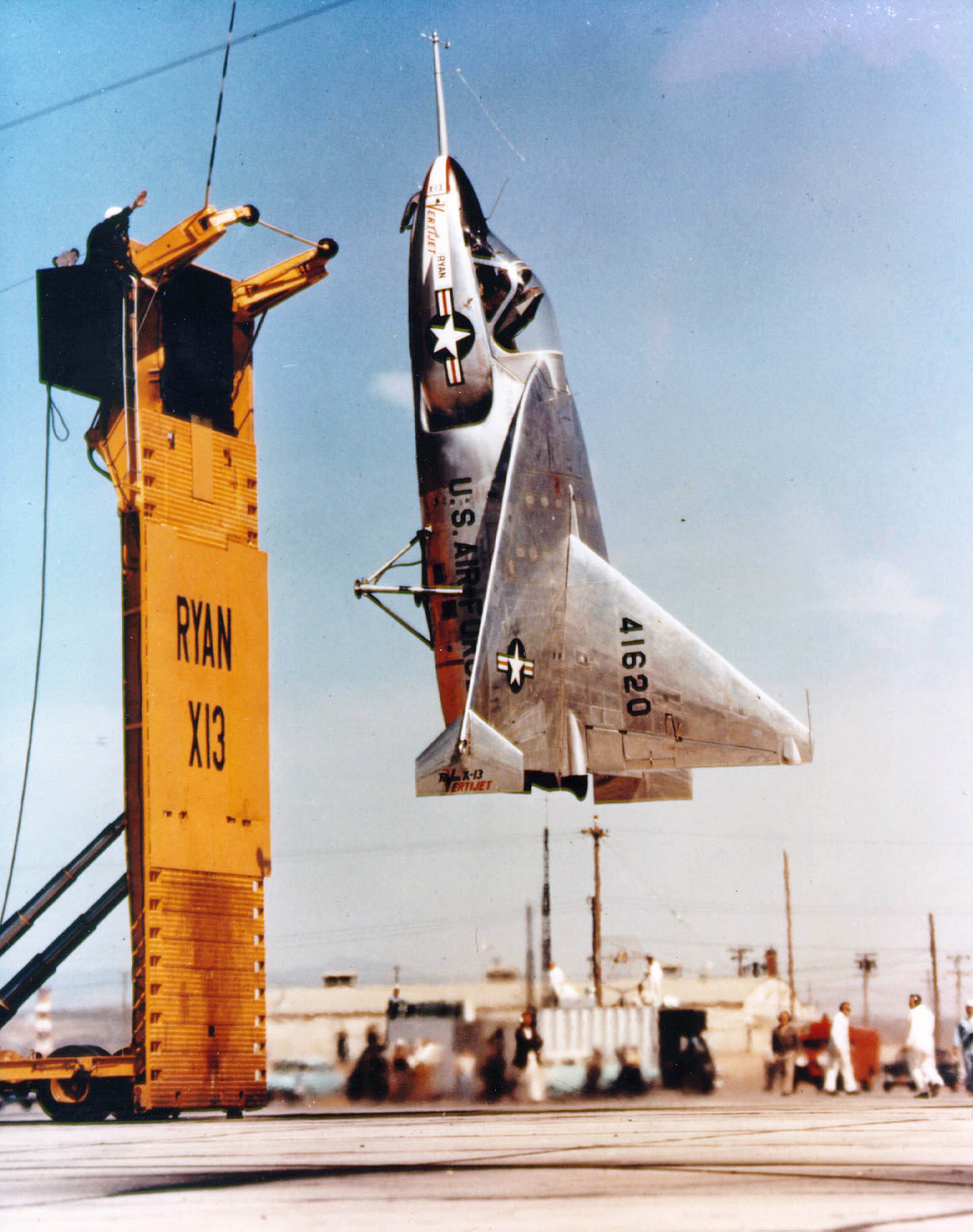
- The X-13 in flight at Edwards Air Force Base

General information
- Type: Experimental VTOL jet aircraft
- Manufacturer: Ryan Aeronautical
- Status: on display (2)
- Primary user: United States Air Force
- Number built: 2

History
- First flight: December 10, 1955
- Retired: September 30, 1957

The Ryan X-13 Vertijet (company designation Model 69) is an experimental tail-sitting vertical take-off and landing (VTOL) jet aircraft built by Ryan Aeronautical and flown in the United States in the 1950s. The main objective of the project was to demonstrate the ability of a pure jet to vertically take off, hover, transition to horizontal forward flight, and vertically land.

== Development ==
External videos
- Takeoff, horizontal flight and Landing on YouTube of Ryan X-13 Vertijet

Just after World War II, Ryan engineers wondered whether the Ryan/U.S. Navy FR-1 Fireball, which had a thrust-to-weight ratio of 1:1 at low fuel quantities, would take off vertically. The United States Navy's Bureau of Aeronautics in 1947 awarded Ryan a contract, originally under the designation F3R, to investigate the development of a vertically launched jet fighter. This was part of a program to evaluate the feasibility of submarine-based aircraft. Ryan conducted remote controlled VTOL tethered rig tests from 1947 to 1950 and a flying rig in 1951. Ryan was awarded an Air Force contract in 1953 to develop an actual flying jet-powered VTOL aircraft, which was given the designation X-13. The aircraft was designed using calculations on a REAC 100, and two prototypes were ultimately built.

The Ryan X-13 Vertijet was 23 ft 5 in (7.14 m) long. It was just large enough to accommodate the single-place cockpit with a tilting seat and the 10,000 lbf (44 kN) thrust Rolls-Royce Avon turbojet. The high-mounted delta wing of the aircraft had a wingspan of only 21 ft (6.4 m) and was capped with flat endplates. The nose of the aircraft had a hook on the underside and a short pole for gauging distance from the trailer. The hook was used to hang the Vertijet from the vertical trailer bed landing platform. After the aircraft was secured vertically, the trailer was lowered to horizontal and then used to transport the aircraft on the ground. Pitch and yaw control in hover were provided by vectored engine thrust. Roll control was provided by "puffer" jets (also known as "jet reaction control") mounted outboard of the wingtip endplates.

The first prototype (#54-1619) was fitted with temporary landing gear and made its first horizontal flight on December 10, 1955. Later, it made full horizontal to vertical attitude conversions and back again at altitude. The first prototype then had the landing gear replaced with a tail-mounted framework that held it in a vertical attitude on the ground. Using this rig, hooking practice was conducted. The second prototype (#54-1620), on April 11, 1957, made a vertical take-off from the vertically raised trailer, transitioned to horizontal flight and back again. It then returned to the vertical trailer and landed by hooking the landing wire. Flight tests were performed by two test pilots: Ryan's Chief Test Pilot Peter F. "Pete" Girard, and Ryan Test Pilot W. L. "Lou" Everett.

On July 28–29, 1957, the X-13 was demonstrated in Washington, D.C. It crossed the Potomac River and landed at the Pentagon.

The Air Force chose not to continue development of the Ryan X-13 Vertijet because of the lack of an operational requirement.

== Operational history ==
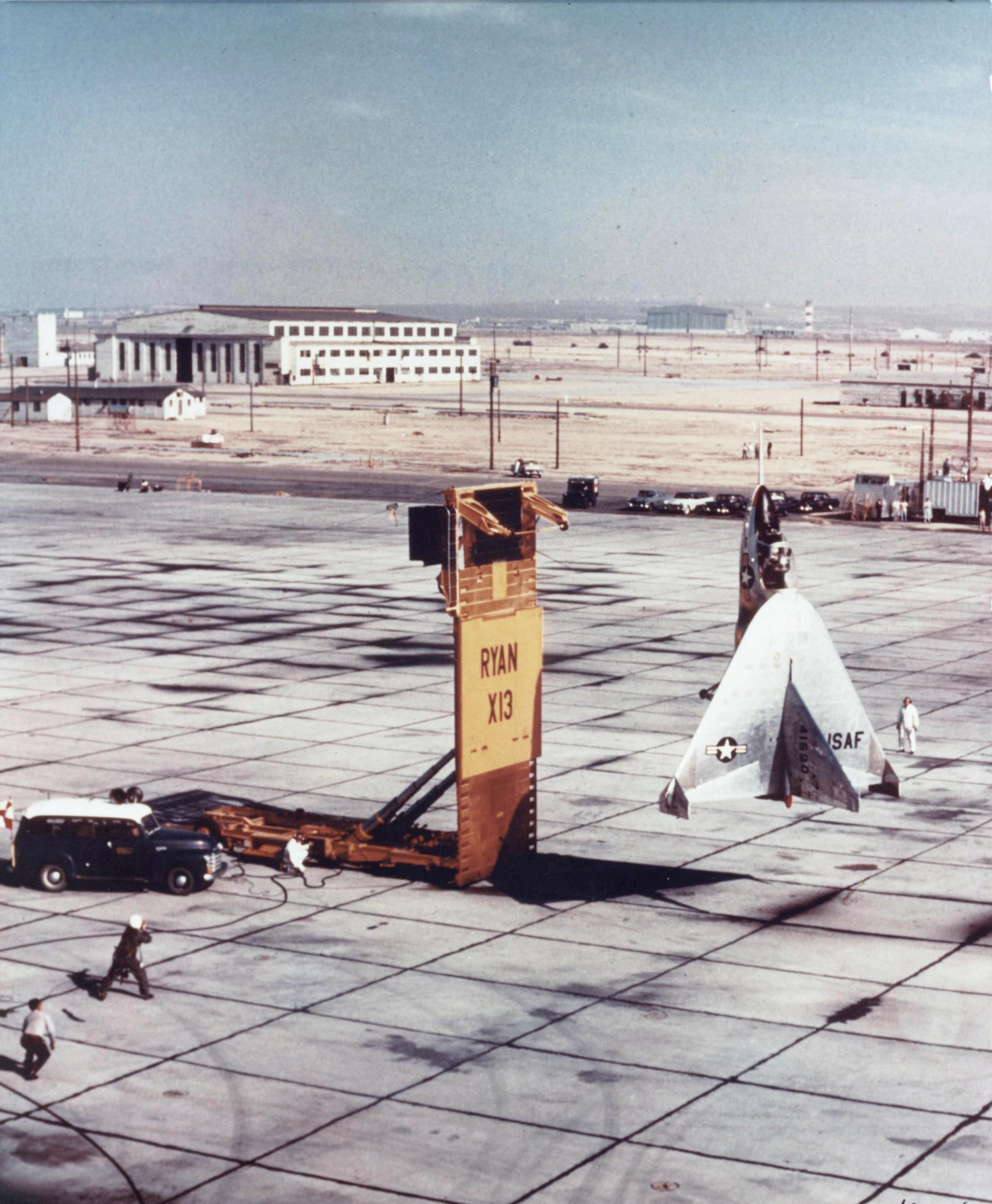
1957 flight test

The X-13 was designed to investigate vertical takeoff, horizontal flight transition, and return to vertical flight for landing. The first prototype of the X-13 was equipped with temporary tricycle landing gear. The X-13 was flown conventionally on December 10, 1955 to test its aerodynamic characteristics. The Vertijet was then fitted with a temporary "tail sitting" rig. On May 28, 1956, it was flown from the ground in a vertical position to test its hovering qualities. The X-13 VertiJet completed its first full-cycle flight at Edwards Air Force Base, California, on April 11, 1957, when it took off vertically from its mobile trailer, angled over into a horizontal attitude, and flew for several minutes. The X-13 then transitioned to vertical flight and slowly descended back onto its trailer and landed.

== Surviving aircraft ==
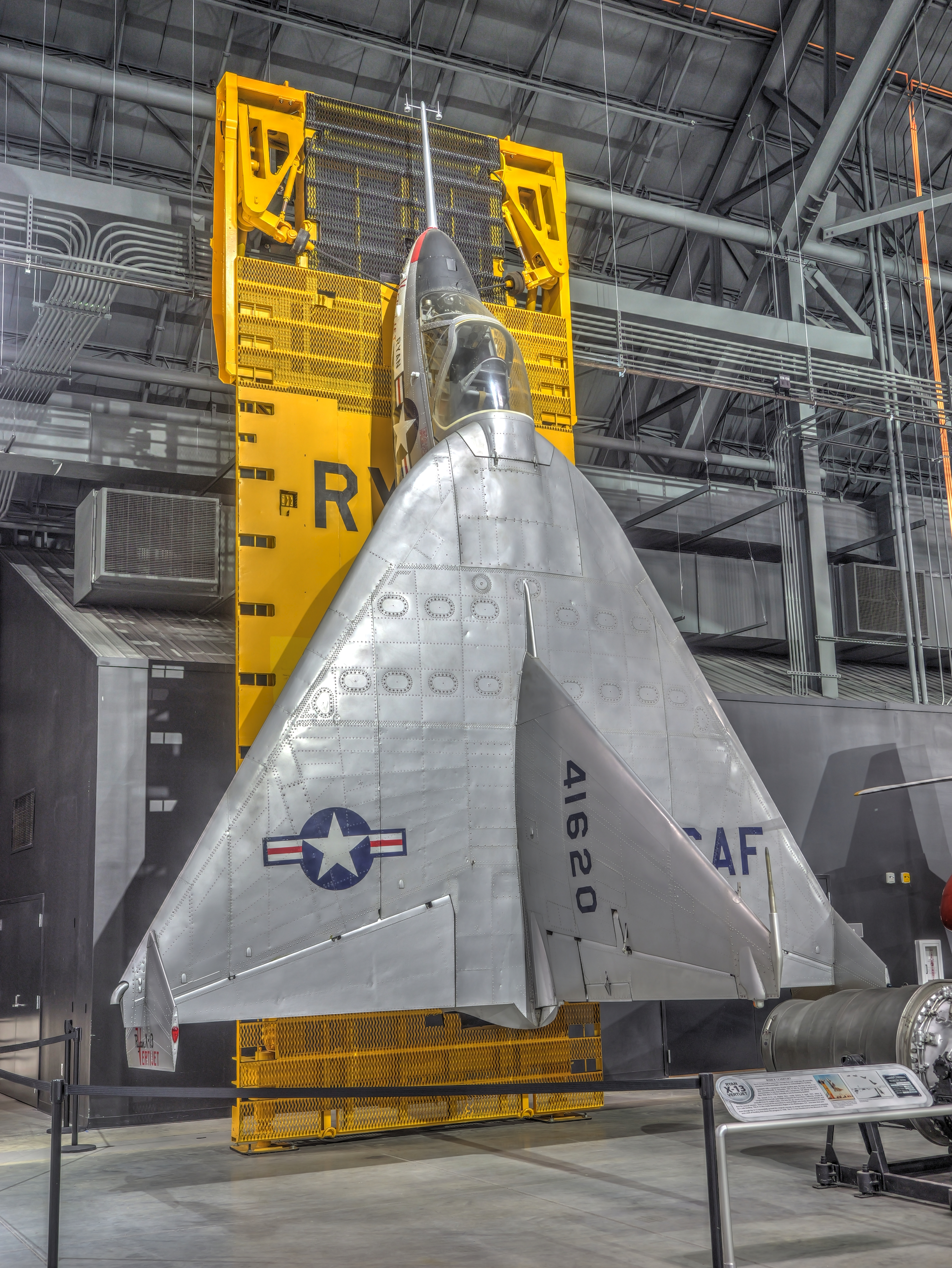
Ryan X-13 Vertijet in USAF National Museum (2023)

Only two X-13 aircraft were built and both are on public display:

- Serial number 54-1619 is on display at the Gillespie Field Annex of the San Diego Air & Space Museum. It is on loan from the Smithsonian's National Air and Space Museum in Washington, D.C.
- Serial number 54-1620 which was the Vertijet which made the full-cycle flight on April 11, 1957 was transferred to the National Museum of the United States Air Force, Dayton, Ohio, in May 1959. It is on display in the museum's Research and Development Hangar.

== Specifications (X-13) ==
General characteristics

- Crew: one pilot
- Length: 23 ft 5 in (7.14 m)
- Wingspan: 21 ft 0 in (6.40 m)
- Height: 15 ft 2 in (4.62 m)
- Wing area: 191 sq ft (17.8 m^{2})
- Empty weight: 5,334 lb (2,424 kg)
- Gross weight: 6,730 lb (3,059 kg)
- Max takeoff weight: 7,200 lb (3,272 kg)
- Powerplant: 1 × Rolls-Royce Avon RA.28 turbojet, 10,000 lbf (44 kN) thrust

Performance

- Maximum speed: 350 mph (560 km/h, 300 kn)
- Range: 192 mi (307 km, 167 nmi)
- Service ceiling: 20,000 ft (6,100 m)
- Wing loading: 35.2 lb/sq ft (172 kg/m^{2})
- Thrust/weight: 1.48

== See also ==
Aircraft of comparable role, configuration, and era

- Rolls-Royce Thrust Measuring Rig
- Short SC.1
- SNECMA Coléoptère

Related lists

- List of experimental aircraft
- List of X-planes

== Bibliography ==
- Allen, Frencis (July–August 2002). "Upwardly Mobile: Ryan's X-13 Vertijet". Air Enthusiast. No. 100. pp. 28–39. ISSN 0143-5450.
- United States Air Force Museum. Wright-Patterson AFB, Ohio: Air Force Museum Foundation. 1975.
