= Ground-directed bombing =

Ground-directed bombing (GDB) is a military tactic for airstrikes by ground-attack aircraft, strategic bombers, and other equipped air vehicles under command guidance from aviation ground support equipment and/or ground personnel (e.g., ground observers). Often used in poor weather and at night (75% of all Vietnam War bombings "were done with precision [sic] GDB"), the tactic was superseded by an airborne computer predicting unguided bomb impact from data provided by precision avionics (e.g., GPS, GPS/INS, etc.) Equipment for radar GDB generally included a combination ground radar/computer/communication system ("Q" system) and aircraft avionics for processing radioed commands.

A 21st century variant of ground-directed bombing is the radio command guidance for armed unmanned aerial vehicles to effect ground-directed release of ordnance (e.g., precision-guided munitions for bombing such as the AGM-114 Hellfire).

== World War II ==
In early 1945, ground-directed bombing was invented by Lt Col Reginald Clizbe, deputy commander of the 47th Bombardment Group (Light), using automatic tracking radar in Northern Italy for A-26C missions (e.g., in the Po Valley). Development was by a team that included Donald H. Falkingham (who was awarded the Air Medal) that modified radar plotting to transmit control commands to the pilot direction indicator (bomb release was eventually automated from the ground radar). Similar to the ground training configuration in the US for bombardiers with the Norden bombsight, in a tent near the SCR-284 radar a bombsight was automatically positioned over a large map by the plotting signals converted from the radar track's spherical coordinates from the SCR-284 ranging and antenna pointing circuits. The guidance signals output from the moving bombsight as it viewed the map were then relayed to the aircraft as if the bombsight were on board (e.g., to a 1945 AN/ARA-17 Release Point Indicator).

Post-war, ground radar command guidance was common for missiles designed to bombard ground targets, such as the AN/MSQ-1A with alternating current analog computer initially used for guidance of the MGM-1 Matador (the Republic-Ford JB-2 Loon had used ground radar guidance in 1945, and a few V-2s bombarding England used radio control in 1944.)

== Korean War ==
Korean War GDB equipment of the United States Marine Corps included the AN/MPQ-14, and GBD in Korea "was first tried on November 28 [1950], when a detachment of the 3903d Radar Bomb Scoring Squadron used truck-mounted AN/MPQ-2 radars [derived from the World War II SCR-584 gun laying set] to guide B–26s against enemy positions in front of the 25th Infantry Division." Three USAF RBS detachments (e.g., Det 5) commanded GDB until the 502nd Tactical Control Group "assumed control of the 3903's three MPQ-2 radar sets" in January 1951, and the radar sites "became full-scale tactical air-direction posts called Tadpoles [code]-named Hillbilly, Beverage, and Chestnut,…about ten miles behind the front lines near the command posts of the I, IX, and X Corps." On February 23, 1951, the 1st Boeing B-29 Superfortress mission controlled by an MPQ-2 was flown, and a new AN/MSQ-1 Close Support Control Set was at Yangu, Korea, by September 1951 (AN/MPS-9 with OA-132 plotting computer & board). The similar AN/MSQ-2 Close Support Control Set also developed by Rome Air Development Center (MPS-9 radar & OA-215) began arriving in 1951 (in October, one GDB detachment that hadn't been provided MSQ-2 Technical Orders mistakenly bombed itself by using MSQ-1 procedures.) Korea GDB operations of 2380 & 204 respective daylight & nighttime raids included 900 flown by USMC Vought F4U Corsairs.

== Vietnam War ==
Vietnam War GDB equipment included the USMC AN/TPQ-10 "Course Directing Central" and the United States Air Force "Bomb Directing Centrals" with bomb ballistics computer by Reeves Instrument Corporation (AN/MSQ-77, AN/TSQ-81, & AN/TSQ-96) for Combat Skyspot. From 1966-1971, Air Support Radar Teams controlled more than 38,010 AN/TPQ-10 missions, directing more than 121,000 tons of ordnance on 56,753 targets (e.g., during the USMC "Operation Neutralize" bombing campaign against the North Vietnamese' siege of "Con Thien"). In addition to Arc Light B-52 airstrikes, GDB during the war was used against Cambodia targets of Operation Menu from Bien Hoa Air Base and by Operation Niagara, while Commando Club was used for GDB of the Red River Delta (e.g., Hanoi).

== Late Cold War ==
Post-Vietnam War GDB Strategic Air Command missions were occasionally used for training/readiness, e.g., to maintain proficiency of aircrews and SAC's GDB-qualified technicians at 1st Combat Evaluation Group RBS sites. A new GBD system developed c. 1980 from the AN/TPB-1C Course Directing Central was the solid-state US Dynamics AN/TPQ-43 Bomb Scoring SetAN/TPQ-43 SEEK SCORE which included optical tracking. The AN/TPQ-43 ("Seek Score") replaced the AN/MSQ-77, -81, & -96 systems at the end of the Cold War before being decommissioned in 2007, and GDB systems were also designated for use during airdrops as part of the Ground Radar Aerial Delivery System (GRADS).
