= Thomas Lauritsen =

American nuclear physicist

Thomas Lauritsen (November 16, 1915 – October 16, 1973) was an American nuclear physicist best known for his abilities at designing and (with his own hands) building experimental facilities and instrumentation for experimental nuclear physics; and as the longtime co-author of a periodic compilation of nuclear data. Except for brief periods abroad, his career was entirely at the California Institute of Technology, mostly as a professor of physics. In 1969 he was elected as a member of the National Academy of Sciences and also the American Academy of Arts and Sciences.

== Biography ==
Lauritsen was the son of Caltech physicist Charles C. Lauritsen and Sigrid (Henriksen) Lauritsen, a radiologist. Born in Denmark, he emigrated to the United States with his parents as an infant. Matriculating at Caltech for his undergraduate (B.S. 1936) and graduate (Ph.D. 1939) years, he participated in the buildup of the experimental facilities of his father's laboratory, one of the frontier nuclear physics laboratories in the 1930s. Devices that he built operated effectively and efficiently. For example, with his contemporary William A. Fowler, he designed and built a pressurized Van de Graaff electrostatic accelerator that operated continuously and productively from 1939 until 1979.

In 1939, Lauritsen traveled to the Niels Bohr Institute in Copenhagen, where he built a duplicate of the Caltech accelerator and collaborated on research with Niels Bohr and the latter's son, Aage Bohr. Tommy and Aage became lifelong friends and collaborators. After the German invasion of Denmark in 1940, his return to the United States with his new Danish wife, Else Chievitz (the daughter of Danish resistance leader Ole Chievitz), was hastily arranged. Tommy returned to Denmark for a year in 1952-53 (as a Fulbright lecturer) and another year in 1963-64.

Lauritsen's principal research interest was in the nuclear spectroscopy of the light nuclei, particularly in areas of importance to astrophysics. His most lasting contribution to nuclear physics was the creation of a review publication, "Energy Levels of Light Nuclei" (with later co-authors including notably Fay Ajzenberg-Selove) that was issued first in 1948 and in updated versions for many years after.

In the 1960s Lauritsen become involved in many governmental advisory activities to DOD, ARPA, IDA, AEC (now DOE), and NSF. His collected papers and several oral history interviews are in the Caltech archives.
