= 502d Air Operations Group =

Inactive United States Air Force unit

- Active: 1945–1957; 2000–2006
- Country: United States
- Branch: United States Air Force
- Role: Air Control
- Part of: Pacific Air Forces
- Engagements: Korean War
- Decorations: Presidential Unit Citation; Air Force Outstanding Unit Award; Korean Presidential Unit Citation

Insignia
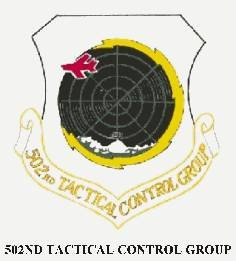
- 502d Air Operations Group emblem (Approved 25 August 1953)

The 502d Air Operations Group in an inactive United States Air Force unit. It was last active in October 2006 at Hickam Air Force Base, Hawaii, where it had served as the umbrella for intelligence and operational support units under Pacific Air Forces

The unit was first activated as the 502nd Tactical Control Group in December 1945. In 1950 it was rushed to Korea where it fought in the Korean War, earning two Presidential Unit Citations for its actions. It remained under Far East Air Forces after the war until it was inactivated in October 1957.

== History ==
At the beginning of the Korean War, the United States Air Force's only tactical control group was the 502d at Pope Air Force Base, North Carolina. To respond, Fifth Air Force organized the 6132d Tactical Air Control Squadron, which established a full-scale Tactical Air Control Center at Taegu Air Base, South Korea on 23 July 1950.

Less than three months later, the 502nd and its subordinate squadrons moved from Pope to Korea. Elements left behind at Pope by the 502d were used to form the 507th Tactical Control Group there. In October 1950 the 502d replaced the 6132nd TCS in the mission of directing tactical air operations in Korea. Through its 605th Tactical Control Squadron, the group operated the Tactical Air Control Center and worked with the United States Army in a Joint Operations Center. The group's two aircraft control and warning squadrons operated Tactical Air Direction Centers, which used stationary and mobile radar and communications equipment to guide aircraft on close air support missions. In November a third aircraft control and warning squadron was activated to reinforce the group.

The group also deployed Tactical Air Control Parties, which accompanied ground units to communicate with strike aircraft. These small detachments followed advancing U.S. and allied troops into North Korea in October and November 1950, but the Chinese Communist offensive soon overran several of them. The 502d TCG's headquarters and the Tactical Air Control Center, which had been operating from Seoul in November and part of December, were forced to return to Taegu.

After deployment to the Korean War, in January 1951, the three AN/MPQ-2 radars of the 3903rd Radar Bomb Scoring Group RBS detachments were transferred to the operational control of the 502nd TCG. The MPQ-2 radars guided Martin B-26 Marauders against enemy positions in front of the 25th Infantry Division." On February 23, 1951, the first Boeing B-29 Superfortress mission controlled by an MPQ-2 was flown.

During the spring and summer of 1951, the 502d directed night bombing of enemy targets, including troop concentrations, supply dumps, and motor convoys. As United Nations ground forces drove the enemy back across the 38th Parallel, the group returned to Seoul in June, along with the Tactical Air Control Center and the Joint Operations Center returned to Seoul. In October, the 502nd set up a communications station 100 miles behind enemy lines on Cho-do Island, three miles off the North Korean coast. (Note: The station was operated by Detachment 2, 608th Aircraft Control and Warning Squadron. Also stationed on the island were rescue helicopters and a crash boat from the 22nd Crash Rescue Boat Squadron. Endicott, p. 84.) From this location the detachment guided fighter aircraft against enemy airplanes in MiG Alley, bombers against strategic targets along the Yalu River, and search and rescue aircraft toward survivors who had ditched at sea.

On 6 June 1952, the 502nd was instrumental in the destruction of nine Mikoyan-Gurevich MiG-15 aircraft by directing North American F-86 Sabres to maneuver into a position from which they could advantageously attack the MiGs. In addition, during 1952, Detachment 2 of the 608th Squadron was credited with the first (and possibly the only) confirmed kill of a multi-engine enemy bomber. The following month, the 502nd guided warplanes in attacks on enemy troop formations that blunted communist offensives until the Korean Armistice Agreement was signed in July 1953.

== Lineage ==
- Constituted as the 502d Tactical Control Group

Activated c. 15 December 1945
Inactivated on 1 October 1957

- Redesignated 502d Air Operations Group

Activated on 27 October 2000
Inactivated on 6 October 2006

=== Assignments ===
- Continental Air Forces, c. 5 December 1945
- Tactical Air Command, c. 21 March 1946
- Ninth Air Force, 31 March 1946
- Fourteenth Air Force, February 1949
- Tactical Air Command, 1 September 1950
- Fifth Air Force, 1 October 1950
- 314th Air Division, c. March 1955 – 1 October 1957
- Pacific Air Forces, 27 October 2000 – 6 October 2006

=== Components ===
Center

- Pacific Air Forces Air Mobility Operations Center: 27 October 2000 – 6 October 2006

Squadrons

- 26th Air and Space Intelligence Squadron: 27 October 2000 – 6 October 2006
- 56th Air and Space Plans Squadron: 27 October 2000 – 6 October 2006
- 56th Air and Space Operations Squadron: 27 October 2000 – 6 October 2006
- 502d Air Operations Squadron: 27 October 2000 – 6 October 2006
- 605th Tactical Control Squadron: 15 December 1945 – 1 October 1957
- 606th Tactical Control Squadron (later 605th Aircraft Control and Warning Squadron), 15 December 1945 – 1 October 1957 (attached to Tactical Air Force, Provisional August 1949 – August 1950, Fourteenth Air Force, August 1950 – September 1950: Far East Air Forces, September 1950 – October 1950)
- 607th Tactical Control Squadron (later 605th Aircraft Control and Warning Squadron): 15 December 1945 – 1 October 1957
- 608th Aircraft Control Squadron (later 608th Aircraft Control and Warning Squadron, 608th Tactical Control Squadron): 5 December 1945 – 28 March 1949, 2 November 1951 – 1 October 1957
- 6132d Aircraft Control and Warning Squadron: 9 October 1950 – 2 November 1951
- 1st SHORAN Beacon Unit (later 1st SHORAN Beacon Squadron): attached 27 September – 1 December 1950 and 6 September 1952– unknown

=== Stations ===
- Biggs Field, c. 15 December 1945
- Greenville Air Force Base, South Carolina, January 1947
- Shaw Air Force Base, South Carolina, 1948
- Pope Air Force Base, North Carolina, 27 June 1949 – 27 August 1950
- Pusan Air Base, South Korea, September 1950
- Taegu Air Base, South Korea, October 1950
- Seoul, South Korea, November 1950
- Taegu Air Base, South Korea, 6 December 1950
- Seoul, South Korea, June 1951
- Osan Air Base, South Korea, January 1954 – 1 October 1957
- Hickam Air Force Base, Hawaii, 27 October 2000 – 6 October 2006

=== Awards and campaigns ===
| Award streamer | Award | Dates | Notes |
|---|---|---|---|
| | Presidential Unit Citation | 3 November 1950-21 April 1951 | 502d Tactical Control Group |
| | Presidential Unit Citation | 1 May 1952-30 November 1952 | 502d Tactical Control Group |
| | Air Force Outstanding Unit Award | 1 July 2002–31 August 2004 | 502d Air Operations Group |
| | Korean Presidential Unit Citation | 16 September 1950-25 January 1951 | 502d Tactical Control Group |
| | Korean Presidential Unit Citation | 25 January 1951-31 March 1953 | 502d Tactical Control Group |
| | Korean Presidential Unit Citation | 1 October 1952-27 July 1953 | 502d Tactical Control Group |

| Campaign Streamer | Campaign | Dates | Notes |
|---|---|---|---|
| | UN Offensive | 16 September 1950 – 2 November 1950 | 502d Tactical Control Group |
| | CCF Intervention | 3 November 1950 – 24 January 1951 | 502d Tactical Control Group |
| | 1st UN Counteroffensive | 25 January 1951 – 21 April 1951 | 502d Tactical Control Group |
| | CCF Spring Offensive | 22 April 1951 – 9 July 1951 | 502d Tactical Control Group |
| | UN Summer-Fall Offensive | 9 July 1951 – 27 November 1951 | 502d Tactical Control Group |
| | Second Korean Winter | 28 November 1951 – 30 April 1952 | 502d Tactical Control Group |
| | Korea Summer-Fall 1952 | 1 May 1952 – 30 November 1952 | 502d Tactical Control Group |
| | Third Korean Winter | 1 December 1952 – 30 April 1953 | 502d Tactical Control Group |
| | Korea Summer-Fall 1953 | 1 May 1953 – 27 July 1953 | 502d Tactical Control Group |

== See also ==
- United States Air Force in South Korea
- List of United States Air Force Groups
