= Rome Laboratory =

US Air Force research laboratory in Rome, New York

Rome Research Site
- Rome, New York in the United States
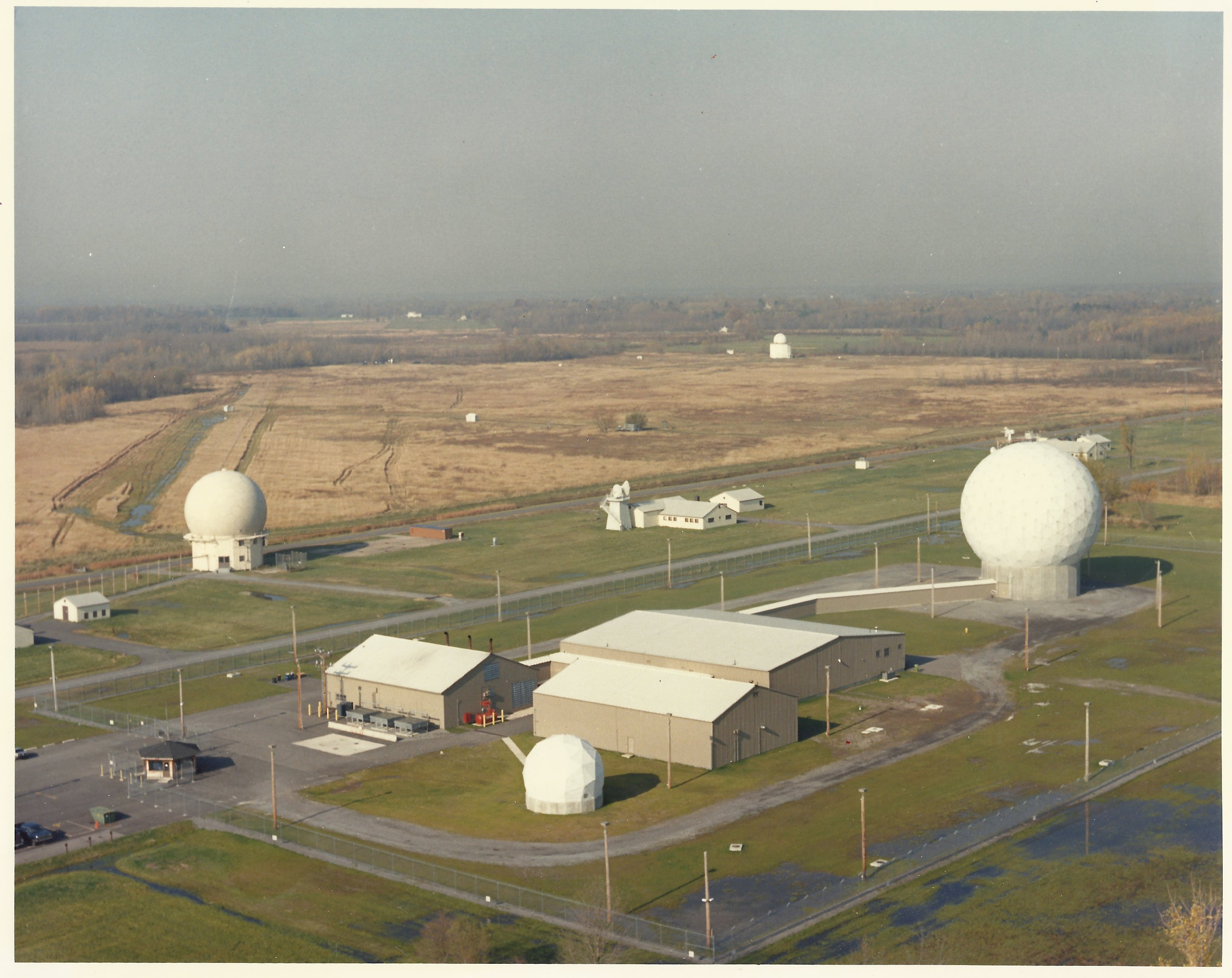
- The Verona Test Annex, a satellite site of Rome Research Site located some 11 miles (18 km) south-west of Rome.

Site information
- Type: Military research laboratory
- Owner: Department of Defense
- Operator: US Air Force (USAF)
- Controlled by: Air Force Materiel Command (AFMC)
- Condition: Operational
- Website: www.afrl.af.mil/RI/

Location
- Location in the United States
- Coordinates: 43°13′16.9″N 75°24′30.8″W

Site history
- Built: 1942 (as Rome Air Depot)
- In use: 1942 – present

Garrison information
- Occupants: Information Directorate of Air Force Research Laboratory (AFRL)

Rome Laboratory (Rome Air Development Center until 1991) is a U.S. Air Force research laboratory for "command, control, and communications" research and development and is responsible for planning and executing the USAF science and technology program.

It is located at Griffiss International Airport, New York. The Griffiss airfield was previous Griffiss Air Force Base for decades.

== History ==
The Rome Air Depot, established 5 February 1942 built U.S. versions of the British Norden bombsights and tested/rebuilt large airplane engines. From 1945 offices and laboratories were set up in buildings constructed during the war.

The base was renamed Griffiss Air Force Base on 23 Jan 1948. Approximately mid-1948, Griffiss AFB received electronics research and development responsibilities from Headquarters, Air Materiel Command. The resources would come from Watson Laboratories and the Middletown testing units at Middletown, Pennsylvania (Middletown Air Depot). Personnel from Middletown arrived at Griffiss AFB as early as 1948. On 6 July 1950, the Senate Committee on Armed Services recommended the establishment of an "Air Force Electronics Center" at Griffiss AFB. President Truman signed the resulting bill on 26 September 1950, and the transfer of Watson Laboratories to Griffiss AFB, beginning on 29 November of the same year, was completed on 14 February 1951. Griffiss AFB was assigned to the Air Research and Development Command on 2 April 1951. On 12 June 1951, Rome Air Development Center (RADC) was officially established.

The 3171st Electronics Research Group activated on 12 January 1949 under the 2751st Experimental Wing formed during World War II, and the 3180th Weapon Equipment Flight Test organization activated on 4 April 1949. On September 26, 1950, the Griffiss AFB Air Force Electronics Center was established—2 Griffiss radar units were established on 12 Oct 50 for less than a year, the 7th and 12th Radar Calibration Units. The entire Watson Laboratories, which was acquiring the "state-of-the-art" Bendix AN/FPS-3 Radar for Air Defense Command, transferred to Griffiss from Camp Coles NJ, from 6 November 1950 until 2 April 1951, the date Griffiss AFB transferred to Air Research and Development Command. During the move the 3151st Electronics Group was activated on 14 March 1951.

=== Rome Air Development Center ===
The Rome Air Development Center headquarters officially opened on June 12, 1951, with the personnel of the headquarters for the 2751st Wing and 3171st & 3151st Groups. These three HQs were discontinued. The 6530th Air Base Wing with subordinate units, e.g., Maintenance and Support Group, were activated on the same date for support through August/November 1952. The centre was for USAF "applied research, development and test of electronic air-ground systems such as detection, control, identification and countermeasures, navigation, communications, and data transmission systems, associated components, and related automatic flight equipment". RADC constructed the 1,205 ft (367 m) Forestport Tower in 1951 for low-frequency communications experiments. On 1 January 1953, RADC reorganized into the Engineering Support Division, Electronic Warfare and Techniques Division, Equipment Development Division, and Systems Division (a Plans and Operations Office at the HQ provided guidance.)

For Air Training Command and Strategic Air Command to score bombing accuracy, and based on the AN/MPQ-2; RADC integrated AN/MPS-9 radars with RBS plotting to create the AN/MSQ-1 (with OA-132 plotting computer/board)) and AN/MSQ-2 (OA-215)—RADC also developed SAC's "AN/GSA-19 Blanking System" for safety at RBS radar stations. RADC began using a new intelligence and reconnaissance laboratory building on 27 May 1954, and an AN/GPA-37 "developed by RADC [and] installed at the Verona Test Site" conducted a 28 December 1955 ground-controlled interception test "on an F-86D fighter interceptor aircraft". Also in 1955 RADC developed phased array radar technology, and the center contracted Bendix's Radio Division in 1958 to build the Bendix AN/FPS-46 Electronically Steerable Array Radar (ESAR) for demonstration (1st "powered up" in November 1960.)

A prototype AN/FPS-43 BMEWS radar completed at Trinidad in 1958 went operational on February 4, 1959, the date of an Atlas IIB firing from Cape Canaveral Launch Complex 11 (lunar reflection was tested January–June 1960.) On 20 January 1960 RADC accepted the Avco AN/FPS-26 Frequency Diversity Radar from Avco for use at SAGE radar stations (later modified into the 474N "Fuzzy-7" SLBM Detection Radar.)

==== Command and Control development ====
On 1 July 1960, RADC was assigned to the Air Force Command and Control Development Division. In late 1960, RADC conducted an "Experimental Passive-Satellite Communication Link" using the Project Echo satellite and Philco terminals for voice transmissions through space from the Trinidad Space Communication Facility to the RADC's Floyd site. In August 1962, RADC established the "AFLC Communications-Electronics Field Office" to monitor missile tests.

A "60-foot-diameter" antenna at the Floyd site built by RADC "particularly to communicate with ECHO II" was dedicated on 30 August 1963. In 1965 based on the USMC AN/MPQ-14, the "SKYSPOT RADC developmental program" designed the AN/MSQ-77 with ballistic computer for Vietnam War high-altitude, low-visibility (e.g., nighttime, inclement weather) strategic bombing missions, and which was also used as a "Close Air Support Bombing System".

==== RTD assignment ====
By June 1965, RADC was assigned to AFSC's Research and Technology Division and had a Communications Research Branch (an early 1960s plan to rename RADC to the Air Force Electromagnetics Laboratory was not implemented.) RADC's Program 673A research resulted in the 440L System Program Office for the Forward Scatter Over-the-Horizon network (AN/FRT-80 transmitters & AN/FSQ-76 receivers) being established on 1 July 1965 (RADC's "Data Reduction Center" processed 440L data transmitted to the Cheyenne Mountain Complex.

RADC developed a 1960s machine translation for Russian language documents and in the late 1960s, RADC coordinated the Ling-Temco-Vought AN/TRN-26 deployable TACAN development for the Vietnam War (1st units went to Israel and Camp David's "DVD" site.) In the 1970s War On Drugs, RADC COMPASS TRIP research investigated "multispectral reconnaissance techniques to locate opium poppy fields". By December 1977 RADC had developed the 322 watt "solid state transmitter and receiver module" while "responsible for [PAVE PAWS] design, fabrication installation, integration test, and evaluation" (through 1980).

==== ESD assignment ====
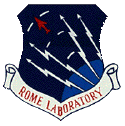
Emblem of Rome Laboratory

On 1 September 1975, RADC was reassigned to AFSC's Electronic Systems Division (ESD). At Hanscom AFB on 1 January 1976, RADC's Detachment 1 was activated for "Electronic Technology" with the personnel and equipment of the 1960 AFCRL's Microwave Physics and Solid State Sciences divisions, known as "RADC East."

In the 1980s and 1990s RADC funded a significant amount of research on software engineering, e.g., the Knowledge Based Software Assistant (KBSA) program.

=== Rome Laboratory ===
In 1990 RADC was redesignated Rome Laboratory which in October 1997 became part of the Air Force Research Laboratory.

== Organization ==
Rome Lab includes or included the following entities:

Information Directorate
The Information Directorate develops information technologies for air, space and ground systems, partnering with other federal agencies, allied nations, state and local governments, and more than 50 major universities. The Rome Laboratory Technical Library is located at 525 Brooks Road, Rome, NY.

Sensors Directorate
Moved to Wright-Patterson AFB under the 1995 Base Realignment and Closure Commission

Divisions and laboratories of the former Rome Air Development Center (RADC) included the Electronic Warfare Laboratory, High Power Laboratory, Photonics Laboratory, 1968 Electronics Laboratory (dedicated 25 October), RADC Systems Division, and the Communications and Control Division which moved from building 106 to building 3 in March 1976. (RADC computer facilities were in bldg 3, which in August 1974 had "a new $2.8 million communications research laboratory".)

== Lineage ==
=== Assignments ===
- Air Force Command and Control Development Division, Air Research and Development Command, 1960
- Research and Technology Division, Air Force Systems Command, 1965
- Electronic Systems Division, Air Force Systems Command, 1975
- Air Force Research Laboratory, Air Force Materiel Command, October 1997
