= Gloria Lubkin =

American science journalist and editor (1933–2020)

Gloria Becker Lubkin
- Born: Gloria Becker; May 16, 1933; Philadelphia, Pennsylvania
- Died: January 26, 2020 (aged 86); Raleigh, North Carolina
- Education: Temple University (BS in Physics, 1953); Boston University (MA in Nuclear Physics, 1957)
- Occupations: Science journalist, editor for Physics Today
- Spouse: Yale Jay Lubkin (m. 1953, div. 1968)
- Children: 2

Gloria Lubkin (née Becker; May 16, 1933 – January 26, 2020) was an American science journalist and editor for the magazine Physics Today, of which she was the editor-in-chief from 1985 to 1994. She also cofounded the Theoretical Physics Institute at the University of Minnesota and was a fellow of both the American Physical Society and the American Association for the Advancement of Science.

== Early life and education ==
Lubkin was born in Philadelphia, Pennsylvania on May 16, 1933, to a Jewish family. At age 16, she enrolled at Temple University, where she graduated with a BS in Physics in 1953. In 1957, she earned an MA in nuclear physics from Boston University, under the supervision of Fay Ajzenberg-Selove.

She married Yale Jay Lubkin, son of computer scientist Samuel Lubkin, in 1953, and they had two children before divorcing in 1968.

== Career ==
After earning her master's, Lubkin worked as a mathematician at Fairchild Stratos. As a nuclear physicist for TRG Inc, she designed shielding for nuclear reactors and nuclear-powered aircraft. She also worked at C.W. Post as an assistant professor, and was acting physics chair at Sarah Lawrence College from 1961 to 1962.

In 1963, Lubkin cold-called Physics Today, looking for a position as a science journalist. She was soon fired, however, when it was discovered she was pregnant. She was rehired in 1965, six weeks after the birth of her daughter, and stayed at Physics Today for 45 years. Over the course of her career, she served as associate editor (1963–70), senior editor (1970–84), editor-in-chief (1985–94), editorial director (1995–2000), editor-at-large (2001–03), and editor emerita (2004–09). She prepared special issues of the magazine dedicated to Physics in Japan, Richard Feynman, and Andrei Sakharov, as well as for its 50th anniversary. Her final story for the magazine was an obituary for the nuclear physicist Fay Ajzenberg-Selove, one of the few women physicists to have received the National Medal of Science.

Lubkin was one of the first American science journalists to travel to the Soviet Union (in 1968) and to the People's Republic of China (in 1979). In China she toured laboratories in Shanghai and Beijing, and attended a televised meeting of physicists in the Great Hall of the People.

At the American Physical Society, Lubkin was very active in the Forum on the History of Physics, serving in a variety of roles. In 1970 she cofounded the Committee on the Status of Women in Physics at APS. She became a Nieman Fellow of Harvard University in 1974, and later served on the Nieman advisory committee and the selection committee for MIT's Knight Science Journalism Fellowships. She was named a Fellow of the AAAS in 1986.

As a recognition of her role in helping to found the William I. Fine Theoretical Physics Institute at the University of Minnesota, the Gloria Becker Lubkin Professorship of Theoretical Physics was established there in 1990. In 2013, she was awarded the title of visiting senior research scholar at the University of Maryland Department of Physics.
