= IBM 632 =

Accounting machines, introduced in 1958

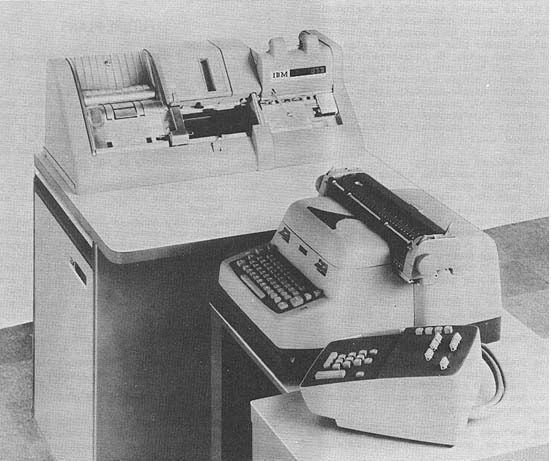
- IBM 632 Electronic Typing Calculator
- Type: Accounting machine
- Released: 1958; 68 years ago
- Introductory price: $175–395/month to lease

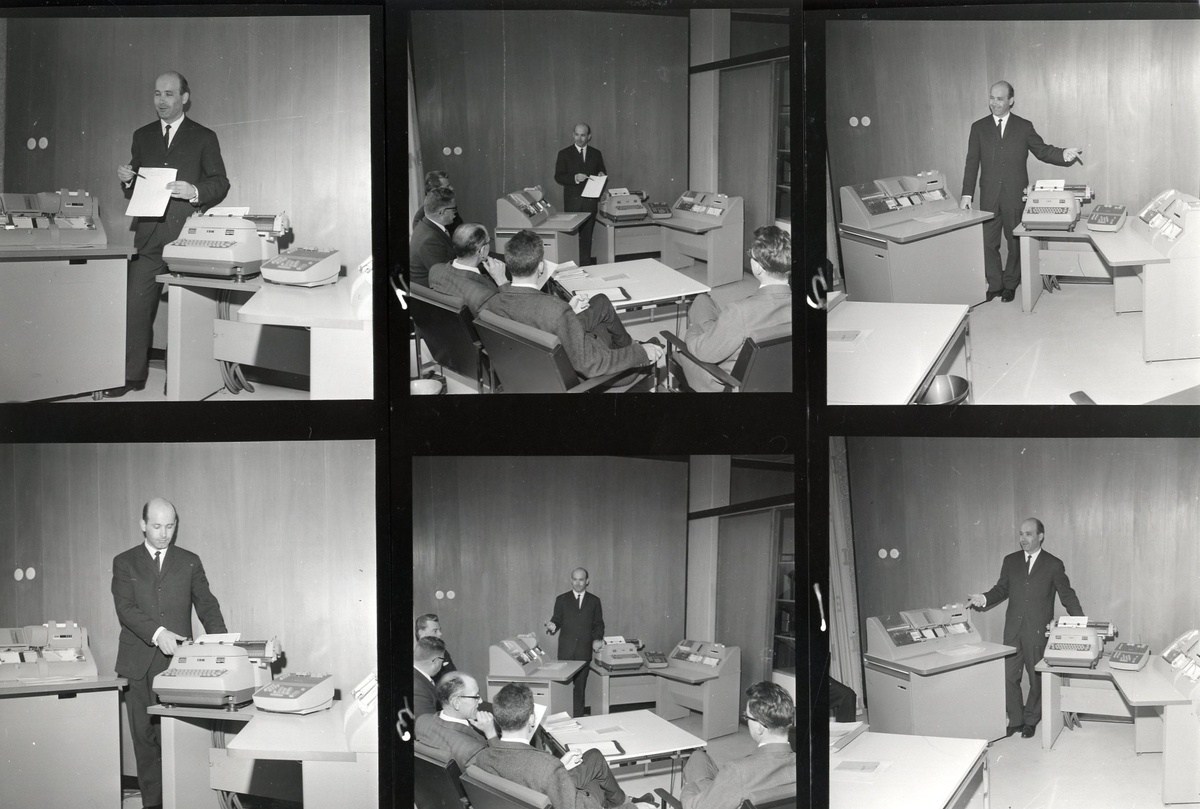
IBM 632 being demonstrated by IBM Norway

The IBM 632 was a valve-and-relay driven basic (very basic) accounting machine, introduced in 1958, that was available in seven different models. It consisted of an IBM Electric typewriter and at least a punched card unit (like the IBM 024) that housed the "electronics" in two gates (a relay gate and an electronic gate). Some machines also had a card reader unit (like the IBM 026). A small core memory provided storage for 8 numeric 12 digit words.

The machine was programmed primarily with a plastic tape that moved synchronously with the typewriter carriage. Each tape would typically handle one application. The tape mechanism was mounted behind the carriage in the typewriter unit. Further programming was provided in the card machines program drums. Programs were only executed as the machine typed or spaced over a column - tabbing or carriage returning was not recognised.

As the typewriter carriage moved from field to field three program entries were available in the last three columns of each field - as I recall they were Calc1, Calc2, and Pgm. One calculation was allowed in each Calc column. The PGM field allowed a program instruction - a jump in the form of a "jump" to a new column then auto printout of a calculated field (including decimal place control) as well as punched card control, etc. The PGM column was actually the column the typewriter would space to after typing the last character in the field (either under operator or PGM control).

For example, after entering "price" then tabbing and entering "qty", the machine could automatically space through a dummy field, calculate the $amount on the way and then continue to print it out. The PGM field could then have dictated a carriage return, ready for the next entry.

Two programs were allowed on each tape: primary and alternate. But by resetting the tab-stops it was possible to overlap programs in amazingly complex ways.

Adding was carried out electronically, but multiplication was electro-mechanical. The machine gave off a characteristic kerr-ick-kit-i-tic, kerr-ick-kit-i-tic sound as the relays worked furiously. Multiplication took 3 or 4 seconds, addition, on the other, hand was immediate.

Most machines were used for some type of order-entry/invoicing application, providing a hard-copy invoice and a punched card that could be processed further on some other system. Those with a card reader could do some of that processing themselves, especially if augmented with a sorter.

The first installation was in early 1958 into the Barclay Knitwear company in Kingston, New York. They struck an issue with the 632 because they sold units by the dozen, but because the 632 worked in decimal, rounding meant they were losing money. This was because 1/12 was converted to 0.083. IBM solved the issue by rewiring the 632 so that it worked to five decimal places (0.08333) rather than three.

== Cost, price and rental rates ==
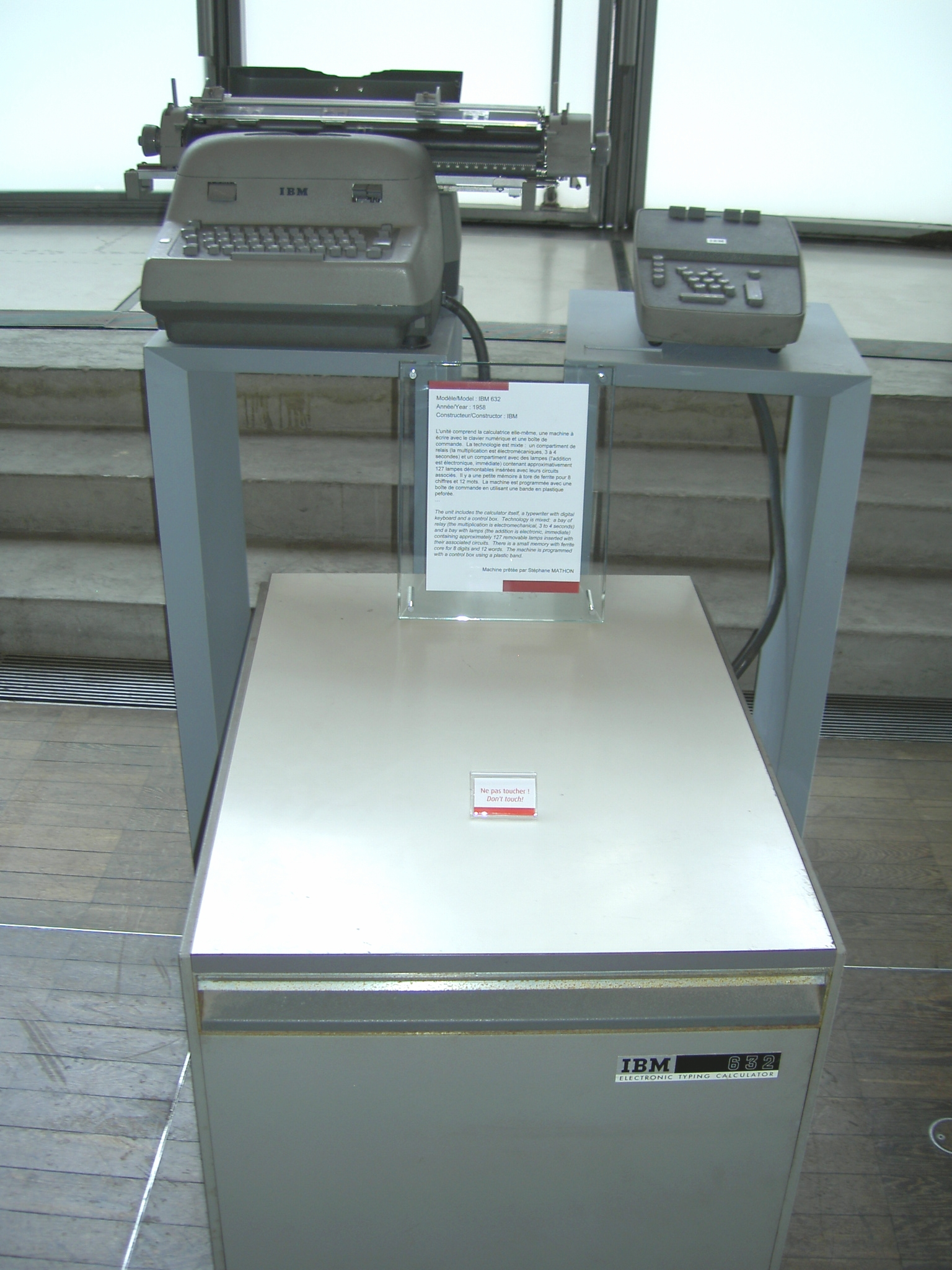
IBM 632

System-Configuration	Cost	Monthly Rental	Maintenance
Model I-Typewriter unit, calculator unit and companion keyboard	$6,000	$175	$300
Model II-Typewriter unit, calculator unit w/non-printing punch & companion keyboard	8,700	235	420
Model III-Typewriter unit, calculator unit w/printing punch & companion keyboard	9,800	260	440
Model IV-Typewriter unit, calculator unit w/tape punch & companion keyboard	11,900	295	535
Model V-Typewriter unit, calculator unit & companion keyboard & card reader	13,700	310	472
Model VI-Typewriter unit, calculator unit w/non-printing punch & companion keyboard & card reader	16,400	370	592
Model VII-Typewriter unit, calculator unit w/printing punch & companion keyboard & card reader	$17,500	$395	$612

Maintenance/service was included in all monthly rental prices. Maintenance/service for purchased machines was additional.
