= Vladimirs Lubkins =

Latvian ice hockey player

- Born: July 6, 1953 (age 72) Perm, Soviet Union
- Height: 5 ft 11 in (180 cm)
- Weight: 176 lb (80 kg; 12 st 8 lb)
- Position: Forward
- Played for: Dinamo Riga; HC Spartak Moscow; HC Amiens
- Playing career: 1976–1992

Vladimirs Lubkins (Russian: Владимир Викторович Лубкин, romanized: Vladimir Viktorovich Lubkin) is retired Soviet and Latvian ice hockey player (forward). He played most of this career for Dinamo Riga, with brief stints with HC Spartak Moscow and HV Amiens of French league.
