= Samuel Lubkin =

Mathematician and computer scientist

Samuel Lubkin (1906–1972) was a mathematician and computer scientist instrumental in the early history of computing.

== Life ==
Lubkin studied mathematics at Cooper Union in New York City, and was president of the Cooper Union Mathematics Club in the 1923–1924 academic year. He received a PhD in applied mathematics from Courant Institute of Mathematical Sciences.

He later went on to work on the design of the ENIAC computer while at the Moore School of Electrical Engineering at the University of Pennsylvania.

Lubkin afterwards joined the US Army's Ballistic Research Laboratory to work with other ENIAC designers on the design of the EDVAC computer's programming system, It has been claimed that the "Operating Manual for the EDVAC", which was authored by Lubkin, was "the bible of the computer industry in the late 1940s and early 1950s".

After that he joined the design team who went on to build the first UNIVAC computer.

In the 1940s, Reeves Instrument Corporation hired Lubkin to lead a project designing their first digital computer. Reeves later decided to build analogue computers instead (which ultimately resulted in the Reeves Electronic Analog Computer series of machines), and Lubkin left the company for a job in the digital computer division of the National Bureau of Standards (the US government organization later renamed the National Institute of Standards and Technology).

The bureau essentially hired Lubkin to replicate his design for the EDVAC, and this would go on to become the bureau's SEAC computer.

== Electronic Computer Corporation ==
Within a few months, Lubkin left the bureau, and started his own company with Murray Pfefferman, who had been part of the SEAC design team, with Lubkin as president. This was the Electronic Computer Corporation. The company was established in Brooklyn, New York, as that is where Lubkin's extended family lived. Even as a fledgling enterprise, the company was able to hire several very experienced engineers who had a pedigree in large corporations like the Eckert–Mauchly Computer Corporation (creator of the ENIAC), as prominent Jewish scientists and engineers were losing their security clearance (and consequently, their defense sector jobs) as a result of the House Un-American Activities Committee, which sometimes equated Jewish heritage with Communist sympathies. Other notable employees included Evelyn Berezin.

The main product of this company was a "low cost" (for the time) digital computer named the ELECOM 100. This was a vacuum tube computer with a drum memory. It was also the first computer in history that operated with magnetic tape data storage, which was a separate peripheral. While smaller than some other room-sized computers, the ELECOM 100 was still not small by modern standards. The machine measured 10 feet wide by 6 feet high by 2 feet deep, not including the desk the operator would need to sit at, plus space for other sundry peripherals. The ELECOM 100 was successfully tested for use at Ballistic Research Laboratory, though there is no evidence BRL ever actually purchased any. There was a unit known to be at the Stevens Institute of Technology in New Jersey, but is unknown who else the ELECOM's early users were, and how many were made. In 1955, it was reported that there were a total of three units in operation.

A subsequent model named the ELECOM 120 was developed. This was essentially the ELECOM 100 (which worked on an octal system) modified for decimal operation, and given expanded memory capacity. In 1955 it was reported that there were five ELECOM 120s in operation; users included Griffiss Air Force Base, Westinghouse Aviation Gas Turbine Division and Shell Development Laboratories (now called Shell Development Emeryville). An ELECOM 50 machine also existed, though this was a purpose-built accounting machine, and an ELECOM 125. (Note: At least 2 125 were sold.)

The ELECOM computers were reasonably successful in the market. In 1953, the Electronic Computer Corporation was acquired by the Underwood Typewriter Company, though Lubkin would stay on as Technical Director of their Electronic Computer Division. In interviews he spoke of pressure to produce cheaper and cheaper machines, and spoke of belief that the future of computing was in less-expensive, purpose-built machines for industry, and not in general purpose computing.

However the Electronic Computer Corporation suffered as a division within the financially ailing typewriter company. Underwood eventually realized it did not have the financial strength to produce the inventory needed to sell the (individually expensive) ELECOM machines, even those that it was already under contract to produce. There was an outstanding order for ELECOM machines from Standard Oil that the chairman of Underwood had to back out of. In 1957, Underwood would get out of the computer business entirely, closing its computer division, after which Lubkin left.

== Later career ==
Lubkin would go on to work as a designer and consultant for computer projects with New York University, Curtiss-Wright, and Republic Aviation.

In 1962, he founded a company of his own called Digital Electronics Inc., and was named chairman of the board. The company set out to focus on "custom-designed data conversion equipment, educational training devices, and a proprietary line of pulse and digital test equipment." Lubkin would apply for and receive several patents for the company, though he and the company would wind up becoming embroiled in litigation with some of his cofounders.

== Personal life ==
Samuel Lubkin had one son, Yale Jay Lubkin (husband to science journalist Gloria Lubkin from 1953 to 1968), with whom he worked at Digital Electronics Inc. He also had one daughter, Annice. He died in 1972.
