= Command guidance =

Type of missile guidance

Command guidance is a type of missile guidance in which a ground station or aircraft relay signals to a guided missile via radio control or through a wire connecting the missile to the launcher and tell the missile where to steer to intercept its target. This control may also command the missile to detonate, even if the missile has a fuze.

Typically, the system giving the guidance commands is tracking both the target and the missile or missiles via radar. It determines the positions and velocities of a target and a missile, and calculates whether their paths will intersect. If not, the guidance system will relay commands to a missile, telling it to move the fins in a way that steers in the direction needed to maneuver to an intercept course with the target. If the target maneuvers, the guidance system can sense this and update the missiles' course continuously to counteract such maneuvering. If the missile passes close to the target, either its own proximity or contact fuze will detonate the warhead, or the guidance system can estimate when the missile will pass near a target and send a detonation signal.

On some systems there is a dedicated radio antenna or antennas to communicate with a missile. On others, the radar can send coded pulses which a missile can sense and interpret as guidance commands. Sometimes to aid the tracking station, a missile will contain a radio transmitter, making it easier to track. Also, sometimes a tracking station has two or more radar antennas: one dedicated to track a missile and one or more dedicated to track targets. These types of systems are most likely to be able to communicate with a missile via the same radar energy used to track it.

== Command to line of sight (CLOS) ==
The CLOS system uses only the angular coordinates between the missile and the target to ensure the collision. The missile is made to be in the line of sight between the launcher and the target (LOS), and any deviation of the missile from this line is corrected. Since so many types of missile use this guidance system, they are usually subdivided into four groups: A particular type of command guidance and navigation where the missile is always commanded to lie on the line of sight (LOS) between the tracking unit and the aircraft is known as command to line of sight (CLOS) or three-point guidance. That is, the missile is controlled to stay as close as possible on the LOS to the target. More specifically, if the beam acceleration is taken into account and added to the nominal acceleration generated by the beam-rider equations, then CLOS guidance results. Thus, the beam rider acceleration command is modified to include an extra term. The beam-riding performance described above can thus be significantly improved by taking the beam motion into account. CLOS guidance is used mostly in shortrange air defense and antitank systems.

=== Manual command to line of sight (MCLOS) ===
Both target tracking and missile tracking and control are performed manually. The operator watches the missile flight, and uses a signaling system to command the missile back into the straight line between operator and target (the "line of sight"). This is typically useful only for slower targets, where significant "lead" is not required. MCLOS is a subtype of command guided systems. In the case of glide bombs or missiles against ships or the supersonic Wasserfall against slow-moving B-17 Flying Fortress bombers this system worked, but as speeds increased MCLOS was quickly rendered useless for most roles.

=== Semi-manual command to line of sight (SMCLOS) ===
Target tracking is automatic, while missile tracking and control is manual.

=== Semi-automatic command to line of sight (SACLOS) ===
Target tracking is manual, but missile tracking and control is automatic. Is similar to MCLOS but some automatic system positions the missile in the line of sight while the operator simply tracks the target. SACLOS has the advantage of allowing the missile to start in a position invisible to the user, and is generally far easier to operate. SACLOS is the most common form of guidance against ground targets such as tanks and bunkers.

=== Automatic command to line of sight (ACLOS) ===
Target tracking, missile tracking and control are automatic.

== Command off line of sight (COLOS) ==
This guidance system was one of the first to be used and still is in service, mainly in anti-aircraft missiles. In this system, the target tracker and the missile tracker can be oriented in different directions. The guidance system ensures the interception of the target by the missile by locating both in space. This means that they will not rely on the angular coordinates like in CLOS systems. They will need another coordinate which is distance. To make it possible, both target and missile trackers have to be active. They are always automatic and the radar has been used as the only sensor in these systems. The SM-2MR Standard is inertially guided during its mid-course phase, but it is assisted by a COLOS system via radar link provided by the AN/SPY-1 radar installed in the launching platform.

== Retransmission homing ==
Retransmission homing, also called "track-via-missile" or "TVM", is a hybrid between command guidance, semi-active radar homing and active radar homing. The missile picks up radiation broadcast by the tracking radar which bounces off the target and relays it to the tracking station, which relays commands back to the missile. An advantage is that costly tracking hardware is safely positioned on the ground rather than the missile, and is hence able to be reused after the destruction of the missile.

== Examples ==
Examples of missiles which use command guidance include:

- Russian: S-25 Berkut, S-75 Dvina, S-125 Neva/Pechora, 9K330 Tor, 2K11 Krug
- American: Nike Ajax, Nike Hercules, Nike Zeus
- Indian: Akash

Older western missiles tend to use pure semi-active radar homing.

Pure command guidance is not normally used in modern surface-to-air missile (SAM) systems since it is too inaccurate during the terminal phase, when a missile is about to intercept a target. This is because the ground-based radars are distant from the target and the returned signal lacks resolution. However, it is still quite practical to use it to guide a missile to a location near a target, and then use another more accurate guidance method to intercept the target. Almost any type of terminal guidance can be used, but the most common are semi-active radar homing (SARH) or active radar homing (ARH).

Examples of missiles which use command guidance with terminal SARH include:

- Russian: SA-5 'Gammon', SA-6 'Gainful', SA-11 'Gadfly', SA-17 'Grizzly'
- American: RIM-67 Standard Missile 2 (SM-2)

Examples of missiles which use command guidance with terminal ARH include:

- Russian: S-300VM missile system, S-350E, S-400, S-500
- American: RIM-174 Standard ERAM, MIM-104F Patriot Advanced Capability 3 (PAC-3)
