= Reeves Instrument Corporation =

Cold War computer and radar manufacturer

Reeves Instrument Corporation (RICO) was a Cold War manufacturer of computer and radar systems for the United States. The corporation was the Project Cyclone laboratory operator for simulation of guided missiles, and RICO developed several Strategic Air Command combination (radar/computer/communications) systems ("Q" systems).

== History ==
Reeves was originally "Hudson American…just a little bit before the end of D-Day" and in 1946 Reeves Sound Laboratory, a division of Reeves-Ely Laboratories (R.E.L.), was researching "advance gunfire control systems and computers; radar and tracking systems; guided missile controls; aircraft control instruments… (Research initiated 1942.)" RICO was awarded the Department of the Navy contract No. N60ori-128 on June 10, 1946, for "development of a guided missile simulator and the operation of a simulation laboratory [for] research and development on guided missile simulation" and "development and construction of a rapid and precise automatic analog computer suitable for detailed simulation of guided missiles". The contract's Task Order III on June 12, 1947, required Reeves provide "a simulation laboratory, the Project Cyclone Laboratory, which was to be operated by the Reeves Analysis and Computer Group." Reeves built the lab's original Reeves Electronic Analog Computers in 1947, and a new computing lab of REACs was contracted under Task Order III in 1949. "The guided missile simulator of Task Order II was completed in early 1949 [with a] satisfactory demonstration in February 1949 of the guided missile simulator solving a three-dimensional guided missile problem".

Early in the Cold War, Reeves developed and tested the AN/USQ-24 [sic] [AN/MSQ-2A] Bomb Scoring Central, a variant of the MSQ-2 Close Support Control Set developed by Rome Air Development Center. Bomb Scoring Centrals by RICO were used for Radar Bomb Scoring (RBS), as well as Korean War ground-directed bombing (GDB) controlled by TADPOLE sites. "Reeves Instrument Corporation [was] a wholly owned subsidiary of … Claude Neon, Inc." on April 15, 1955, when the former merged into Dynamics Corporation of America; and on January 20, 1956, the other Reeves division of Neon—Reeves-Ely Laboratories, Inc.--also merged into Dynamics.

In 1958, RICO moved production to its Roosevelt Field plant on East Gate Blvd in Garden City, New York.

In the early 1960s, the Reeves AN/MSQ-35 Bomb Scoring Central was produced for Strategic Air Command RBS and in 1965, the Reeves AN/MSQ-77 Bomb Directing Central was built for Vietnam War GDB. Reeves also produced a 1967 transportable variant of the vacuum tube AN/MSQ-77, and one of the AN/TSQ-81 variants was destroyed after the Battle of Lima Site 85 in Laos. By the end of the war the vacuum-tube Reeves AN/TSQ-96 Bomb Directing Central with a solid state Univac 1219B ballistic computer was being used for GDB.
