= Havre Electronic Bomb Scoring Site =

Havre Electronic Bomb Scoring Site (HC 30, Box 8000; Havre MT 59501–8000 in 1989) is a Formerly Used Defense Site for USAF evaluation of aircrews on training missions. The site was initially established for the 1965 Fairchild Trophy, the Strategic Air Command Bombing and Navigation Competition. (Havre Bomb Plot); the RBS Express was stationed at a siding near Chinook, Montana; and a new "temporary mobile radar site" 35 mi (56 km) northeast of Havre, Montana, was announced in 1982 ("MDL 35"). The 1983 site was in Hill County, Montana, with seven semi-trailers, and a new permanent site was approved by 1984 for also north of Havre ("new operations facility and housing for 74 military personnel [planned for] late 1985.") "Upon decommissioning of [the mobile site at] Havre, MT Serial Number 7 went to Detachment 18, Forsyth, Montana for SAC Bomb-Comp 1987 and then to Detachment 20, 1 CEVG (Conrad, Montana) in early 1988."

In August 1986, the last Havre radar site was established when the Hawthorne Bomb Plot equipment from Nevada was emplaced at the permanent site. Detachment 17 of SAC's Radar Bomb Scoring Division operated equipment such as Radar Bomb Scoring centrals, jamming systems, and surface-to-air radar simulators. The site was 1 of the 6 permanent stations by 1989 along SAC's Strategic Training Range Complex used by the weapons school at Ellsworth AFB (SAC's Gen. Curtis E. LeMay Strategic Warfare Center activated August 1989.) Public Law 102–109 in 1991 allocated $700,000 for the Havre Strategic Training Range Site, which continued operations under Air Combat Command until June 1993. In 1998 at the Havre Training Site, Facility #1--Property Number 189530047, a one-story brick frame structure of 6,843 sq ft (0.1571 acres)—was declared excess in the Federal Register.
