= Hawthorne Bomb Plot =

Formerly Used Defense Site in Nevada

- Navy Fallon RBS
- Babbitt, Nevada; Near Hawthorne, Nevada
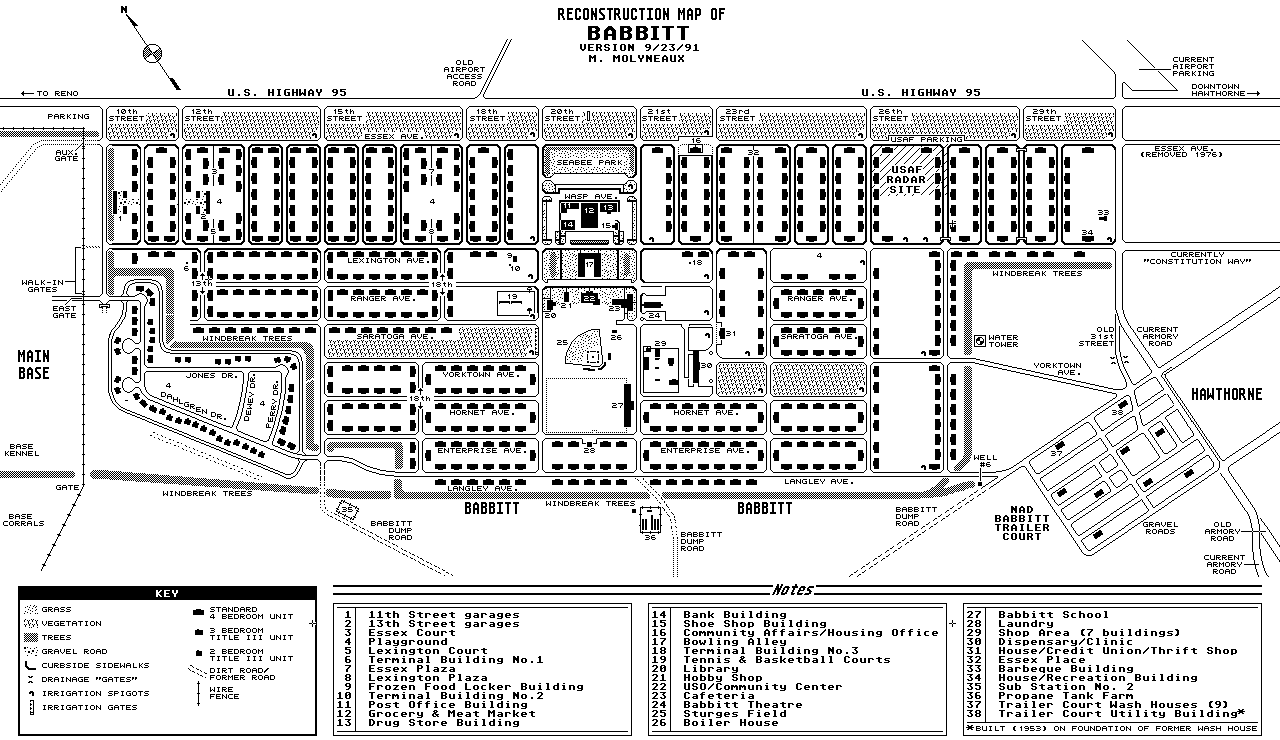
- Map of Babbitt, with the station to the east

Site information
- Operator: United States Air Force

Location
- Coordinates: 38°32′10.84″N 118°38′2.73″W

Site history
- Fate: Demolished

Garrison information
- Past commanders: Unknown-1966 Lt Col Hollacher; 1966-Unknown Lt Col McHan

Hawthorne Bomb Plot is a Formerly Used Defense Site that had a Strategic Air Command (SAC) AUTOTRACK radar station during the Cold War. Operations began at a temporary RBS train site for RBS Express #2 was at the Hawthorne area in December 1961, and the 11th Radar Bomb Scoring Squadron subsequently established the fixed military installation for Radar Bomb Scoring in Babbitt, Nevada, the military housing community near the local Navy/Army depot.

Detachment 12 operated and maintained the radars, e.g., c. 1977-2000, Reeves AN/MSQ-77 Bomb Directing Central (serial number 10) was at the Hawthorne Bomb Plot after use for Guam RBS and Vietnam Combat Skyspot bombing. The unit was reassigned to 1CEVG's RBS Division in 1966 and tracked training sorties at the Nellis Air Force Range and scored SAC bombers. Hawthorne's Oil Burner route "OB-10 Hawthorne" for SAC low-level bomber flights extended from a "point west of Elko, Nevada, running southwest to Mina, Nevada" at flight level "FL130-140" (the Tonopah "SAC Targets 1 and 2" were at South Antelope Lake.)

The USAF detachment publicized their 1985 move to the Havre Radar Bomb Scoring Site, but the Hawthorne radar station was still used by NAS Fallon in 1993, and the Whiskey Flats RV park was established in the general location of the former radar station in 2004.
