= Gyrodyne QH-50 DASH =

Remotely-piloted Anti-Submarine Warfare helicopter

QH-50 DASH
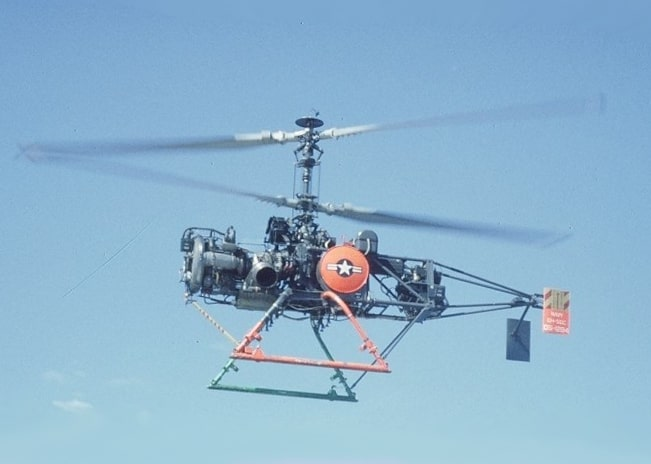
- A QH-50 conducts flight tests off USS Nicholas

General information
- Type: ASW drone
- National origin: United States
- Manufacturer: Gyrodyne Company of America
- Status: In service as target tug
- Primary users: United States Navy United States Army; Japanese Maritime Self-Defense Force
- Number built: 755

History
- Manufactured: 1962–1969
- Introduction date: 1963
- First flight: 1959
- Developed from: Gyrodyne RON Rotorcycle

The Gyrodyne QH-50 DASH (Drone Anti-Submarine Helicopter) is a small drone helicopter built by Gyrodyne Company of America for use as a long-range anti-submarine weapon on ships that would otherwise be too small to operate a full-sized helicopter. It remained in production until 1969. Several are still used today for various land-based roles.

== Design and development ==
DASH was a major part of the United States Navy's Fleet Rehabilitation and Modernization (FRAM) program of the late 1950s. FRAM was started because the Soviet Union was building submarines faster than the US could build anti-submarine frigates. Instead of building frigates, the FRAM upgrade series allowed the US to rapidly update by converting older ships that were less useful in modern naval combat. The navy could upgrade the sonar on World War II-era destroyers but needed a stand-off weapon to attack at the perimeter of the sonar's range. The old destroyers had little room for add-ons such as a full flight deck. The original DASH concept was a light drone helicopter that could release a nuclear depth charge or torpedoes. The aircraft was considered expendable.

The manned Gyrodyne Rotorcycle program of the mid-1950s provided prototype work for the DASH, and ultimately the Rotorcycle was modified to produce the initial drone version, the DSN-1/QH-50A The DSN-1 was powered by a Porsche YO-95-6 72 hp piston engine and carried one Mark 43 homing torpedo. The next developmental version was the DSN-2/QH-50B that was powered by two Porsche YO-95-6 engines and also carried a single Mk 43. Serial production of the DASH began with the third version, the DSN-3/QH-50C, in which a 255 hp (190 kW) Boeing T50-4 turboshaft engine replaced the piston engine and the payload was increased to two Mark 44 torpedoes. A total of 378 QH-50Cs were produced before production ended in January 1966.

A single QH-50A, (DS-1006), which had been retired in 1961 after contractor testing, was re-activated in 1964 to test tilt-float landing gear. A long cylindrical float was added to each corner of the extended skid framework. Each float could rotate 90° from horizontal, oriented to straight ahead, and incorporated a pad at the end for landing on hard surfaces. For landing on water the floats were rotated to the vertical position and the helicopter settled until the floats were approximately 75% submerged, giving a high degree of stability.

== Operations ==
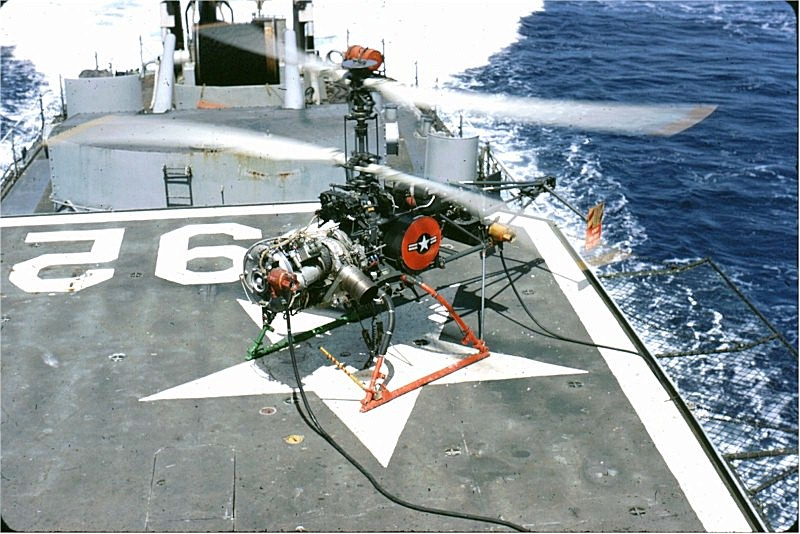
A QH-50C on board the destroyer USS Allen M. Sumner during a deployment to Vietnam between April and June 1967

The DASH's control scheme had two controllers: one on the flight deck, and another in the combat information center. The flight-deck controller handled take-off and landing. The controller in the Combat Information Center (CIC) would fly DASH to the target's location and release weapons using semiautomated controls and radar. The CIC controller could not see the aircraft or its altitude and occasionally lost operational control or situational awareness. Late in the program, there were successful experiments to add a TV camera to the drone. These DASH SNOOPYs were also used as airborne spotters for naval gunfire.

A tethered landing system was developed to land and take off in up to Force-6 seas. This system consisted of steel rails that were screwed to the flight deck and a cable system to pull the helicopter out of the hangar bay. The helicopter was attached to the steel rails so that it would not slide off the flight deck in heavy seas. This system was occasionally set up and used aboard ship, but never used in rough seas to launch a helicopter.

The DASH came about because Gyrodyne had worked with the United States Marine Corps to develop a small, experimental co-axial helicopter, the RON Rotorcycle, for use as a scouting platform. A co-axial helicopter has two contrarotating main rotors to control torque, unlike the more common main rotor/tail rotor found on most helicopters. Co-axial rotors put more power into lift, allowing shorter rotor blades. Both traits help a helicopter to be as small as possible. On the downside, the blades must be kept very far from each other to avoid colliding, since the blades flex as they rotate. This leads to increased complexity and decreased manoeuvrability.

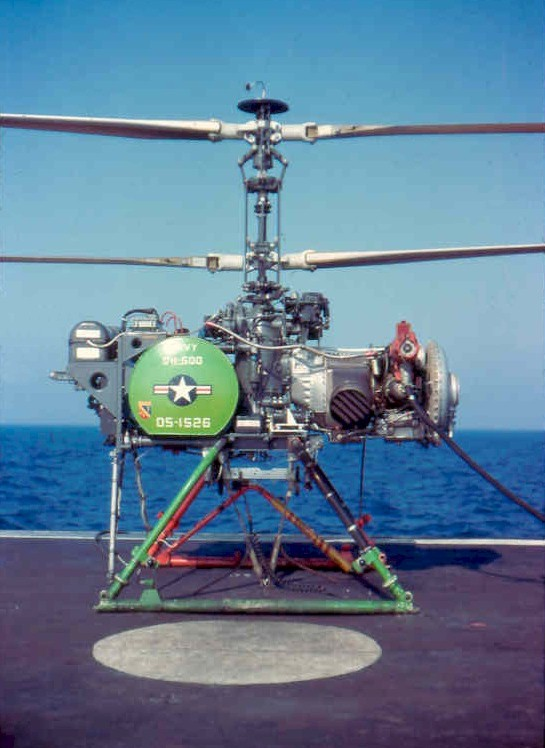
QH-50D DS-1526 aboard USS Allen M. Sumner in the late 1960s

For a drone, these trade-offs were fine. For the DASH role, the original marine version had a turboshaft engine for improved performance and the replacement of the seats and controls with a remote-control system and stowage for two Mark 44 torpedoes. In this form the DASH could be flown up to 22 miles (35 km) from the ship, giving a submarine no warning that it was under attack, at least until the torpedo entered the water.

Since it was expendable, DASH used off-the-shelf industrial electronics with no back-ups. The controls were multi-channel analog FM. Over 80% of operational aircraft losses were traced to single-point failures of the electronics. A total of 10% of the losses were from pilot errors, and only 10% of the losses were from engine or airframe failures.

The DASH program was canceled in 1969 and withdrawn from service 1968–1973. DASHes proved unreliable in shipboard service, with over half of the US Navy's 746 drones lost at sea. This was possibly due to inadequate maintenance support, as other services had few difficulties with their DASHes. Although low reliability was the official reason, the manufacturer pointed to the expenses of the Vietnam War, and the lack of need for antisubmarine capability in that war.

Modified DASH vehicles continued to operate for several more years in the Vietnam War. With attached television cameras, they were used as remote artillery spotters and organic reconnaissance by their ships.

Until May 2006, a small number of QH-50D DASH drones were operated by the United States Army at White Sands Missile Range, where they were used to tow targets and calibrate radars and electronic systems.

The Japanese Maritime Self-Defense Force (JMSDF) operated a fleet of 20 QH-50 drones, for use on its Takatsuki-class and Minegumo-class destroyers. Because the JMSDF regarded the DASH operation as highly prestigious and the aircraft were flown and serviced regularly, they suffered a much lower loss rate than the US Navy. However, with the difficulty of maintaining DASH operations after the termination of the U.S. program, the drones and associated equipment were removed from JMSDF service in 1977.

== Variants ==
DSN-1
U.S. Navy designation for nine pre-production aircraft, redesignated QH-50A in 1962.
DSN-2
U.S. Navy designation for three pre-production aircraft, redesignated QH-50B in 1962.
DSN-3
U.S. Navy designation for 373 production aircraft, redesignated QH-50C in 1962.
QH-50A
DSN-1 redesignated in 1962, nine pre-production aircraft for evaluation, with a 72 hp (54 kW) Porsche flat-four piston engine.
QH-50B
DSN-2 redesignated in 1962, three pre-production aircraft powered by two 86 hp (64.5 kW) Porsche flat-four piston engines.
QH-50C
DSN-3 redesignated in 1962, production aircraft powered by a 300 shp (225 kW) Boeing T50-8A turboshaft engine, 373 built.

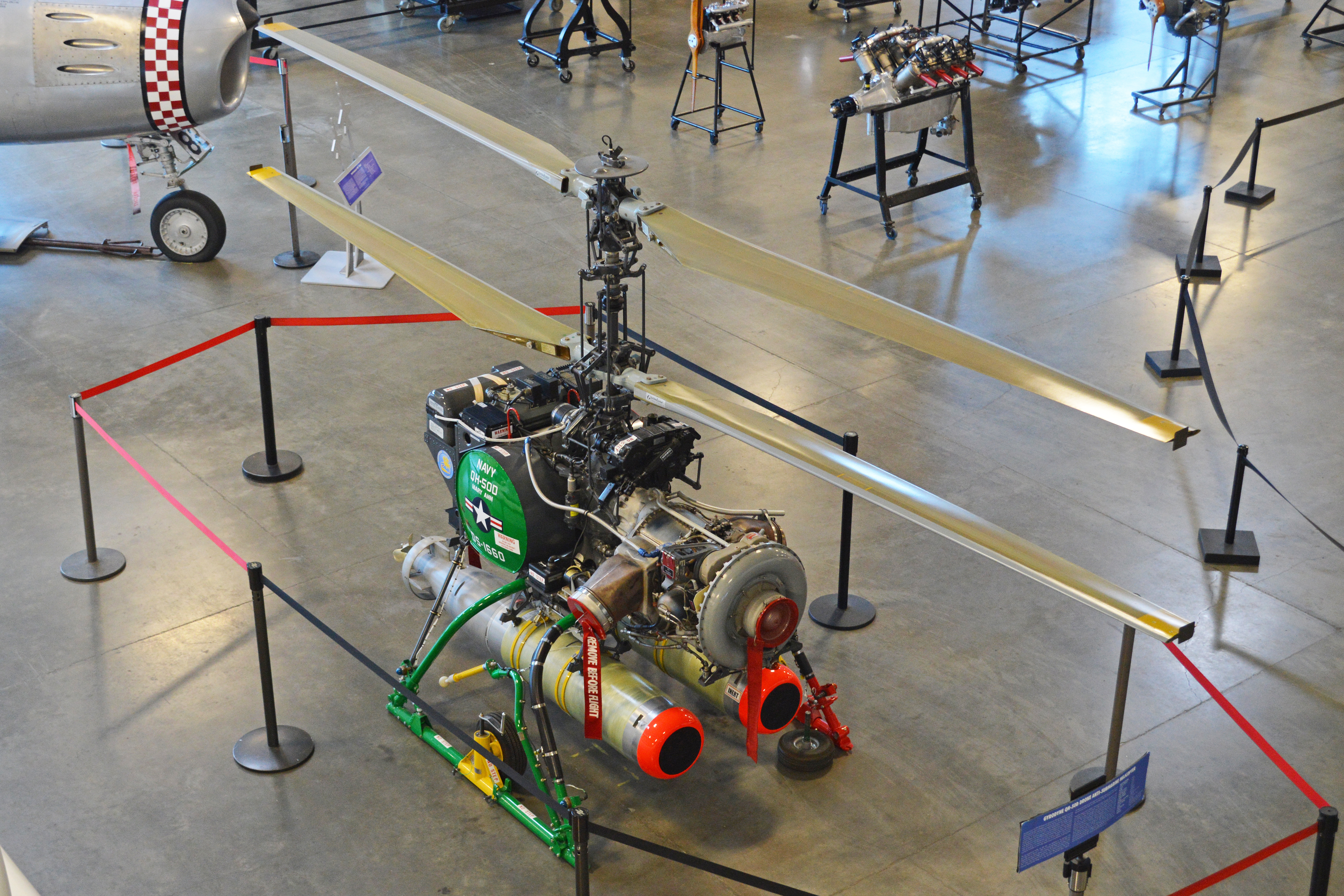
QH-50D DS-1660 “Mary Ann” carrying two torpedoes at the Aerospace Museum of California, Sacramento McClellan Airport

QH-50D
Production aircraft with a larger 365 shp (272 kW) Boeing T50-12 turboshaft engine, fiberglass rotor blades, increased fuel capacity, and no tail assembly. 377 built.
QH-50DM
There were 10 modified QH-50Ds manufactured (Serial number 150AO- 160AO). The "DM" 550shp was supplied by a modified version of the Boeing T50-12. These were used for military reconnaissance for the United States Army during the Vietnam War.
YQH-50E
Three QH-50D aircraft modified with Allison T63-A-5A engines.
QH-50F
Proposed production version of YQH-50E, not built.
QH-50H
Proposed twin-engine version of QH-50F with larger fuselage and rotors, not built.

== Operators ==
Japan

- Japan Maritime Self-Defense Force

United States

- United States Navy
- United States Army

== Surviving aircraft ==
Version	Serial	Location	Notes
QH-50C	DS-1045	Pima Air & Space Museum, Tucson, Arizona	The oldest existing QH-50
QH-50C	DS-1176	Aviation Unmanned Vehicle Museum, Caddo Mills, Texas.	"Lucy" - the only surviving Peanuts character.
QH-50C	DS-1190	American Helicopter Museum, West Chester, Pennsylvania.	Marked as DS‑1082. Moved from Museum of Flight, Seattle, Washington.
QH-50C	DS-1199	USS Orleck, Jacksonville, Florida	Moved from the USS Radford National Naval Museum, Newcomerstown, Ohio after it closed.
QH-50C	DS-1221	Hawthorne Ordnance Museum, Hawthorne, Nevada	
QH-50C	DS-1235	Cradle of Aviation Museum, Garden City, New York	
QH-50C	DS-1261	Russell Military Museum, Russell, Illinois	Moved from the Museum of Aviation, Warner Robins, Georgia.
QH-50C	DS-1284	USS Joseph P. Kennedy Jr., Battleship Cove, Fall River, Massachusetts	
QH-50C	DS-1286	Wings of Freedom Aviation Museum, Horsham, Pennsylvania	On loan from the National Naval Aviation Museum on behalf of the Naval History and Heritage Command
QH-50C	DS-1287	Naval Undersea Museum, Keyport, Washington	Possibly stored
QH-50C	DS-1289	Smithsonian National Air and Space Museum, Steven F. Udvar-Hazy Center, Chantilly, Virginia	Carries a special version of the Mk 57 nuclear bomb.
QH-50C	DS-1320	New England Air Museum, Windsor Locks, Connecticut,	
QH-50C	DS-1322	Military Heritage Collection of North Texas, Nevada, Texas	
QH-50C	DS-1329	National Museum of Military Vehicles, Dubois, Wyoming	Currently being restored.
QH-50C	DS-1347	USS Laffey, Patriots Point, Mt. Pleasant, South Carolina	Marked as DS-1343. Moved from US Army Aviation Museum, Fort Rucker, Alabama
QH-50C	DS-1355	Carolinas Aviation Museum, Charlotte, North Carolina	
QH-50D	DS-1482	The Helicopter Museum, Weston-super-Mare, North Somerset, England	
QH-50D	DS-1543	USS Joseph P. Kennedy Jr., Battleship Cove, Fall River, Massachusetts	Snoopy version. Actually DS-1543A, a fully operational replica built by the Gyrodyne Foundation.
QH-50D	DS-1570	White Sands Missile Range, New Mexico	US Army markings.
QH-50D	DS-1660	Aerospace Museum of California, Sacramento, California	
QH-50D	DS-1664	Estrella Warbirds Museum, Paso Robles, California	
QH-50D	DS-1679	Patuxent River Naval Air Museum, Lexington Park, Maryland	
QH-50D	DS-1709	Classic Rotors Museum, Ramona, California	
QH-50D	DS-1757	Penn State University Aeronautical Engineering School, Hammond building, Pennsylvania	
QH-50D	DS-1914	Hawthorne Ordnance Museum, Hawthorne, Nevada	Fake serial but fully functional replica, built as a tribute to Gyrodyne's founder, and on loan from the Foundation.
QH-50D	DS-1991	Gyrodyne Helicopter Historical Foundation, Reno, Nevada	Fake serial but fully functional replica. Occasionally makes public appearances.
QH-50D	J-19	Japan Maritime Self Defence Force (JMSDF) Kure Museum, Hiroshima, Japan	

== Specifications (QH-50C) ==
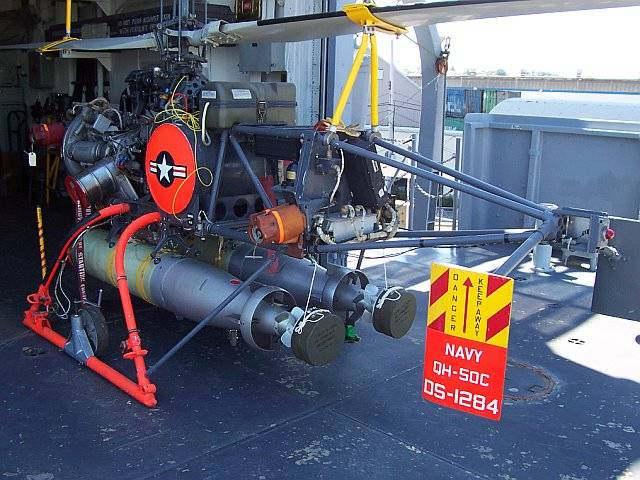
QH-50C DS-1284 with two torpedoes on the Gearing-class destroyer USS Joseph P. Kennedy Jr.

Data from Jane's All The World's Aircraft 1969-70

General characteristics

- Crew: none
- Length: 12 ft 11 in (3.94 m)
- Height: 9 ft 8.5 in (2.96 m)
- Empty weight: 1,154 lb (523 kg)
- Max takeoff weight: 2,285 lb (1,036 kg)
- Fuel capacity: 35 US gal (29 imp gal; 130 L)
- Powerplant: 1 × Boeing T50-BO-8A turboshaft, 300 shp (220 kW)
- Main rotor diameter: 2 × 20 ft 0 in (6.10 m)

Performance

- Maximum speed: 80 kn (92 mph, 148 km/h)
- Cruise speed: 43 kn (50 mph, 80 km/h)
- Range: 71 nmi (82 mi, 132 km)
- Endurance: 1 hr
- Service ceiling: 16,400 ft (5,000 m)
- Rate of climb: 1,880 ft/min (9.6 m/s)

Armament

- Bombs:
  - 2× Mark 44 torpedoes or
  - 1× Mark 46 torpedo

== See also ==
- MQ-8 Fire Scout
- US Battlefield UAVs

Related lists

- List of military aircraft of the United States
