= Salt Lake City Radar Bomb Scoring Site =

The Salt Lake City Radar Bomb Scoring Site ("Salt Lake Bomb Plot") is a Formerly Used Defense Site that was an automatic tracking (AUTOTRACK) radar station during the Cold War. Operated by Detachment 6 of the 11th Radar Bomb Scoring Squadron which had relocated from the Phoenix semi-mobile RBS station in December 1964, the military installation evaluated practice bomb runs by Strategic Air Command simulating attacks on the metropolitan area (e.g., during the 1955 Bombing and Navigation Competition) and on the Hill Air Force Range which had been the Salt Lake City Army Air Base Gunnery Range in World War II.

Originally part of the Salt Lake City Army Airfield, the 0.34 acres (0.14 ha) site at "Salt Lake City Municipal Airport No. 1 (now Salt Lake City International Airport), on the corner of Second Street and E Street" was leased by the USAF from the Salt Lake City Corporation for the site. Equipment included tracking radar ("radar bomb scoring device") which mistakenly resulted in "a dropping of practice" bomb on one occasion, and the 1960 Salt Lake B-58 crash occurred while on a bomb run tracked from the site. Det 6 also provided technicians for the first SAC RBS Express train created in 1961 from "existing U.S. Army stock" at the nearby Ogden General Depot (the Tooele Army Depot's "Army Rail Shops" serviced the train).

Designated FUDS J08UT092700, in May 2005 the site was part of the 135 acres (55 ha) Utah Air National Guard installation.
