= Test and Training Range =

Test and Training Range may refer to:

- Nevada Test and Training Range, the former Tonopah Bombing Range and subsequent Nellis Air Force Range in southern Nevada
  - Nevada Test and Training Range (military unit), the NTTR's military unit (former 98th Range Wing)
  - Nevada Test Site, an NTTR area (former Nevada Proving Ground)
- Strategic Training Ranges, various Strategic Air Command areas with Oil Burner routes used for testing aircrews and equipment (e.g., Radar Bomb Scoring)
- Utah Test and Training Range, a complex of former World War II and Cold War ranges:
  - Dugway Proving Ground, the former Army range in western Utah
  - Hill Air Force Range, the former USAF bombing range near Salt Lake City
  - Wendover Range Complex, the former range in western Utah used for aircrew testing and training for World War II bombing of Hiroshima and Nagasakijz.
