= Sixth Street School =

- U.S. National Register of Historic Places
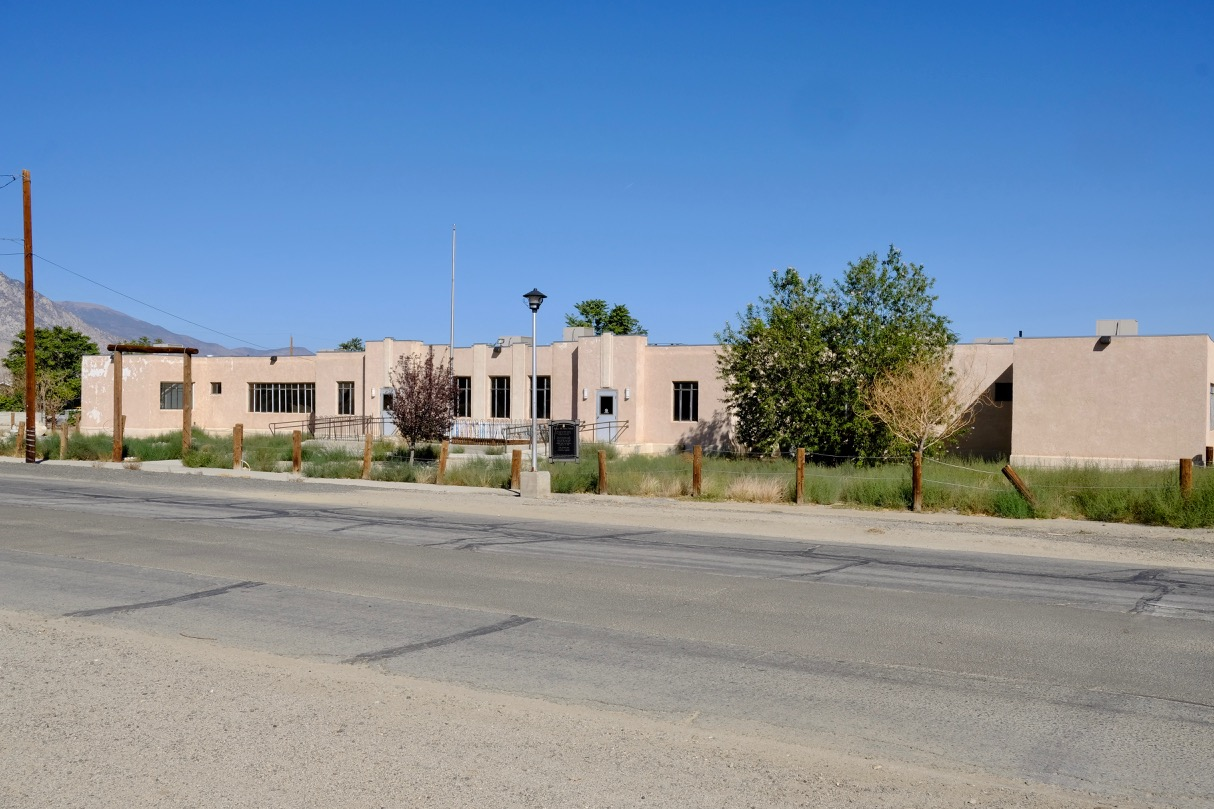

- Location within Nevada Location within the United States
- Location: Sixth and C Sts., Hawthorne, Nevada
- Coordinates: 38°31′35.04″N 118°37′33.77″W
- Area: 1.7 acres (0.69 ha)
- Built: 1936
- Built by: Kent & Nelson
- Architect: Church, Willis
- Architectural style: Art Deco
- NRHP reference No.: 99001241
- Added to NRHP: October 7, 1999

The Sixth Street School, at Sixth and C Sts. in Hawthorne, Nevada, was built in 1936 and expanded later, including in 1942 and 1950. Also known as Hawthorne Elementary School, it is an Art Deco style building that was listed on the National Register of Historic Places (NRHP) in 1999.

It was funded by a local bond issue rather than by any New Deal program, although its expansion was funded by federal programs, after the start of World War II led to growth at the 1928-founded Hawthorne Naval Ammunition Depot and to local population growth. It was deemed significant for its association with military history, and is also locally significant as an Art Deco work, designed by a young architect, University of Pennsylvania-trained Willis Humphry Church.

No longer a school as of the time of its NRHP listing, it is located kitty-corner across from the former Mineral County Courthouse building, which also is NRHP-listed.
