= Babbitt, Nevada =

Babbit, Nevada
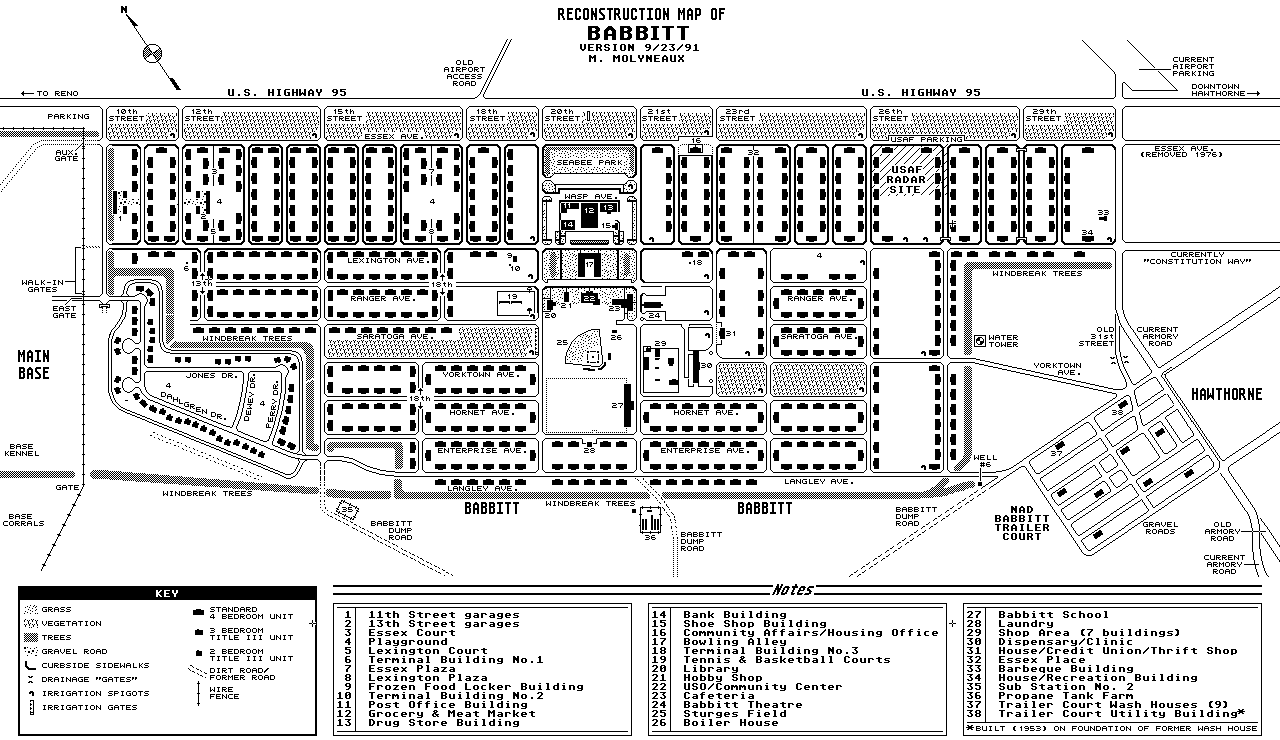
- Babbitt was bisected by several contiguous blocks of public amenities ("Babbitt Court") including Seabee Park, a shopping center, community activity buildings, a cafeteria, movie theater, library, and dispensary. (A school was added later.)

- Location within Nevada Location within the United States
- Coordinates: 38°32′22″N 118°38′15″W
- Country: United States
- State: Nevada
- County: Mineral
- Elevation: 4,229 ft (1,289 m)
- ZIP code: 89416

Babbitt was a populated place established in Mineral County, Nevada, as a 1941 government housing facility for workers of the neighboring Hawthorne Naval Ammunition Depot. Subsequently used as a Cold War radar station (Hawthorne Bomb Plot), remaining town structures include the school building at the intersection of 21st Street and Yorktown Avenue and numerous concrete building foundations. An RV park is located at the east side of the former community.

== World War II ==
The Babbitt housing development for civil service workers was the largest World War II housing project for the depot, cf. a Naval Battalion facility for 2,000 sailors, Camp Jumbo for single men at a former CCC camp, a Construction Camp adjacent to Jumbo, and a trailer park near Hawthorne. The first phase of Babbitt was 25 duplex units on a single block built in 1941, followed by 400 duplexes in 1942 and 487 by 1943. By the final stage of duplex construction near the end of World War II, Babbitt encompassed approximately 40 blocks and 584 duplexes. All duplexes were on the same ten-room plan, with four bedrooms, two bathrooms, two kitchens, and two living rooms. Varying arrangements allowed for one, two, and three-bedroom single units. A small number of duplexes were converted into four-bedroom single units in postwar years.

Avenues that ran east-west were named for aircraft carriers, including Essex, Lexington, Wasp, Ranger, Saratoga, Yorktown, Hornet, Enterprise, and Langley Avenues. North-south streets were numbered from 10th to 30th. The first street with housing on it was 11th, as the neighboring town of Hawthorne had 1st through 10th streets.

== Korean War ==
Additional structures (Title III) built during the Korean War were 65 two-bedroom and 35 three-bedroom single family units in the western corner along the Z-shaped Dahlgren Drive to which three other drives connected: Jones, Dewey, and Perry, all named for U.S. Navy figures. Babbitt housing peaked at approximately 2,590 bedrooms c. 1954.

By 1954, three duplexes had been removed, and one duplex was moved to another location to serve as a community center for the segregated African American part of the community.

== Segregation ==
Until the Civil Rights Act of 1964, Babbitt housing was segregated by a three-block-long gap of approximately 150 feet (46 m) between 26th and 27th streets, separating the area housing African-American workers and their families ("Colored Town" colloq.) from the rest of the town.

The movie theater, the bowling alley, and the soda fountain at Johnson's Pharmacy were also segregated. The Navy constructed a small building used as the "BBQ Pit" business at the edge of the Colored Town, and adjacent was a relocated duplex operating as a segregated community center. Businesses not allowing African-American customers included the El Capitan casino, the Three Rs restaurant and the Home Cafe. Only one bar, owned and operated by African Americans, served them during the 1950s. The NAACP organized sit-ins and demonstrations, and efforts by Governor Sawyer failed to open the casino to African-American customers. Minorities in Babbitt were not integrated into the community until 1970.

In the post-Korean War drawdown, sections of Babbitt were closed off. After some buildings were sold and moved away, 171 duplexes and 51 single units were gone by the early 1960s. Strategic Air Command opened a radar station within Babbitt c. 1961-1985 and after transfer to the Navy, the "Navy Fallon RBS" operated through c. 1994.

By 1970, 114 more duplexes had been moved out, and in the 1970s and 1980s, additional sections were closed and dismantled. The last residents left in 1987, and only a school and a bowling alley remained in operation for some years afterwards. In 2004 the Whiskey Flats RV park was established roughly in the former location of the radar station.
