= Nevada State Route 359 =

Highway in Nevada

State Route 359
- Pole Line Road
- SR 359 highlighted in red

Route information
- Maintained by NDOT
- Length: 33.350 mi (53.672 km)
- Existed: July 1, 1976–present

Major junctions
- South end: SR 167 at the California state line near Mono City, CA
- North end: US 95 in Hawthorne

Location
- Country: United States
- State: Nevada
- County: Mineral

Highway system
- Nevada State Highway System; Interstate; US; State; Pre‑1976; Scenic
← SR 342	→ SR 360

State Route 359 (SR 359) is a state highway in Mineral County, Nevada, in the United States. It starts from where California State Route 167 ends at the California stateline and continues the road on north to U.S. Route 95 in Hawthorne. Prior to the 1976 mass renumbering of Nevada State Routes SR 359 was numbered Nevada State Route 31.

== History ==
For most editions, The official Nevada Highway Map shows SR 31 as equivalent to modern SR 359. However, starting with the 1962 edition and ending with the renumbering, a highway equivalent to modern SR 839 is shown as a disconnected segment of SR 31 with an undesignated dirt road connecting the two segments.

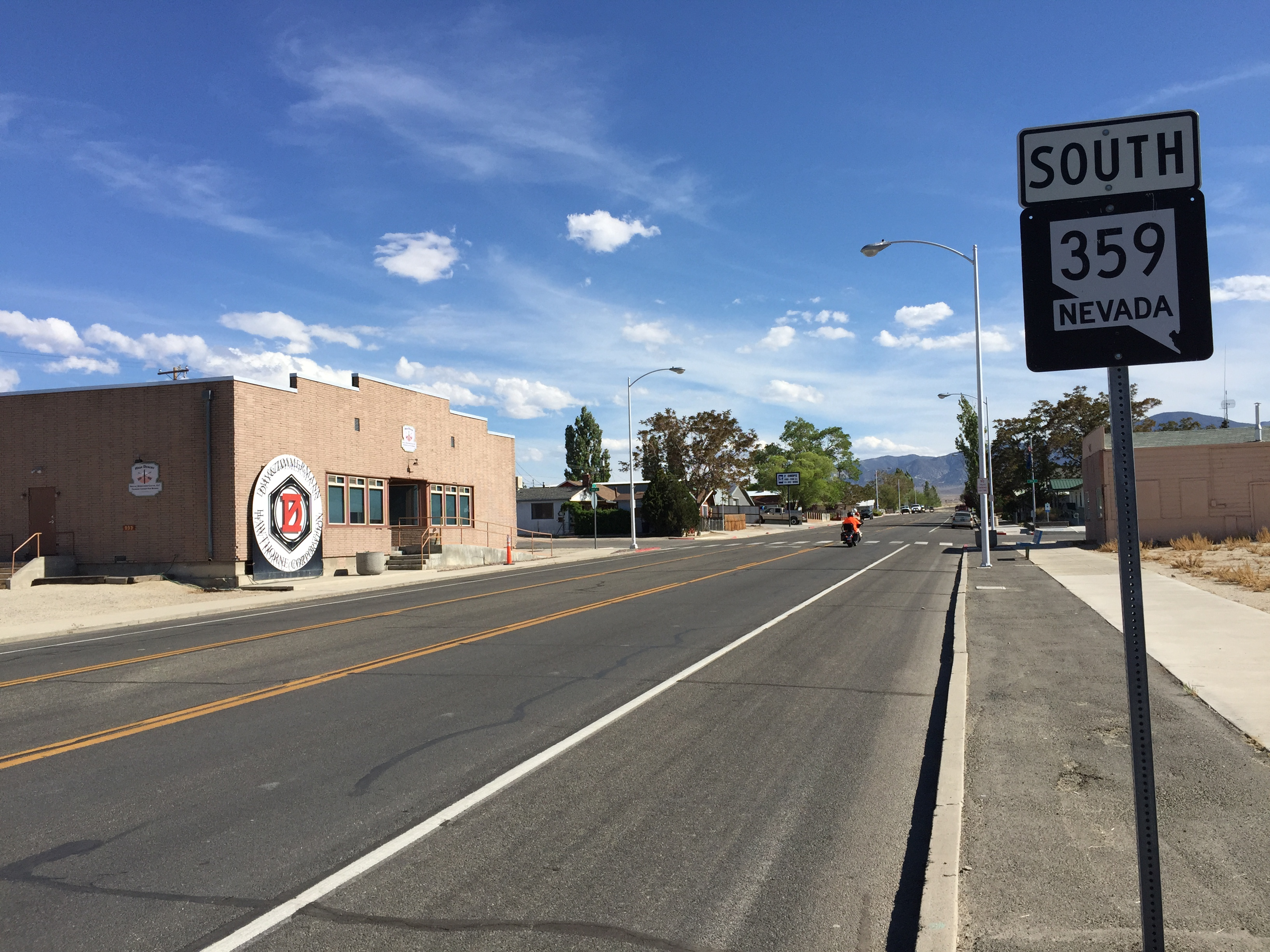
View from the north end of SR 359 looking southbound as seen in 2015

== Major intersections ==
The entire route is in Mineral County.

Location	mi	km	Destinations	Notes
	0.000	0.000	SR 167 west – Lee Vining, Bridgeport	Continuation beyond the California state line
Hawthorne	33.350	53.672	US 95 – Fallon, Tonopah	Northern terminus
1.000 mi = 1.609 km; 1.000 km = 0.621 mi
