= California State Route 167 =

Highway in California

State Route 167
- Pole Line Road
- Map of Mono County in eastern California with SR 167 highlighted in red

Route information
- Maintained by Caltrans
- Length: 21.331 mi (34.329 km)

Major junctions
- West end: US 395 near Lundy
- East end: SR 359 towards Hawthorne, NV

Location
- Country: United States
- State: California
- Counties: Mono

Highway system
- State highways in California; Interstate; US; State; Scenic; History; Pre‑1964; Unconstructed; Deleted; Freeways
← SR 166	→ SR 168

State Route 167 (SR 167) is a state highway in the U.S. state of California in Mono County. From U.S. Route 395, SR 167 runs along Pole Line Road north of Mono Lake eastward to the Nevada state line where it meets Nevada State Route 359. This road runs almost completely straight, and can be seen almost 15 miles (24 km) into the distance as a straight line.

== Route description ==
Route 167 is defined in section 467 of the California Streets and Highways Code, and that the highway is "from Route 395 north of Mono Lake to the Nevada state line in the vicinity of the Pole Line Road".

SR 167 begins with an at-grade intersection with U.S. Route 395. The road then heads northeastward in a straight line, moving slightly north of the north shore of Mono Lake. The route continues in a straight line through a barren landscape in Mono County where it intersects Dobie Meadows Road. SR 167 meets its eastern terminus at the Nevada state line. The road continues as Nevada State Route 359 through Mineral County.

SR 167 is part of the California Freeway and Expressway System, but is not part of the National Highway System, a network of highways that are considered essential to the country's economy, defense, and mobility by the Federal Highway Administration. SR 167 is eligible to be included in the State Scenic Highway System, but it is not officially designated as a scenic highway by the California Department of Transportation.

== Major intersections ==
Except where prefixed with a letter, postmiles were measured on the road as it was in 1964, based on the alignment that existed at the time, and do not necessarily reflect current mileage. Postmile prefixes include: R reflecting a realignment in the route since then, M indicating a second realignment, L referring to an overlap due to a correction or change, and T indicating postmiles classified as temporary. Segments that remain unconstructed or have been relinquished to local control may be omitted. The entire route is in Mono County.

Location	Postmile	Destinations	Notes
Pole Line Junction	0.00	Lundy Lake Road	Continuation beyond US 395
Pole Line Junction	0.00	US 395 – Lee Vining, Bridgeport	West end of SR 167
	21.33	SR 359 – Hawthorne	Continuation beyond the Nevada state line; east end of SR 167
1.000 mi = 1.609 km; 1.000 km = 0.621 mi
