= Mineral County Museum (Nevada) =

History Museum in Hawthorne, Nevada, US

Coordinates: 38.5320°N 118.6253°W

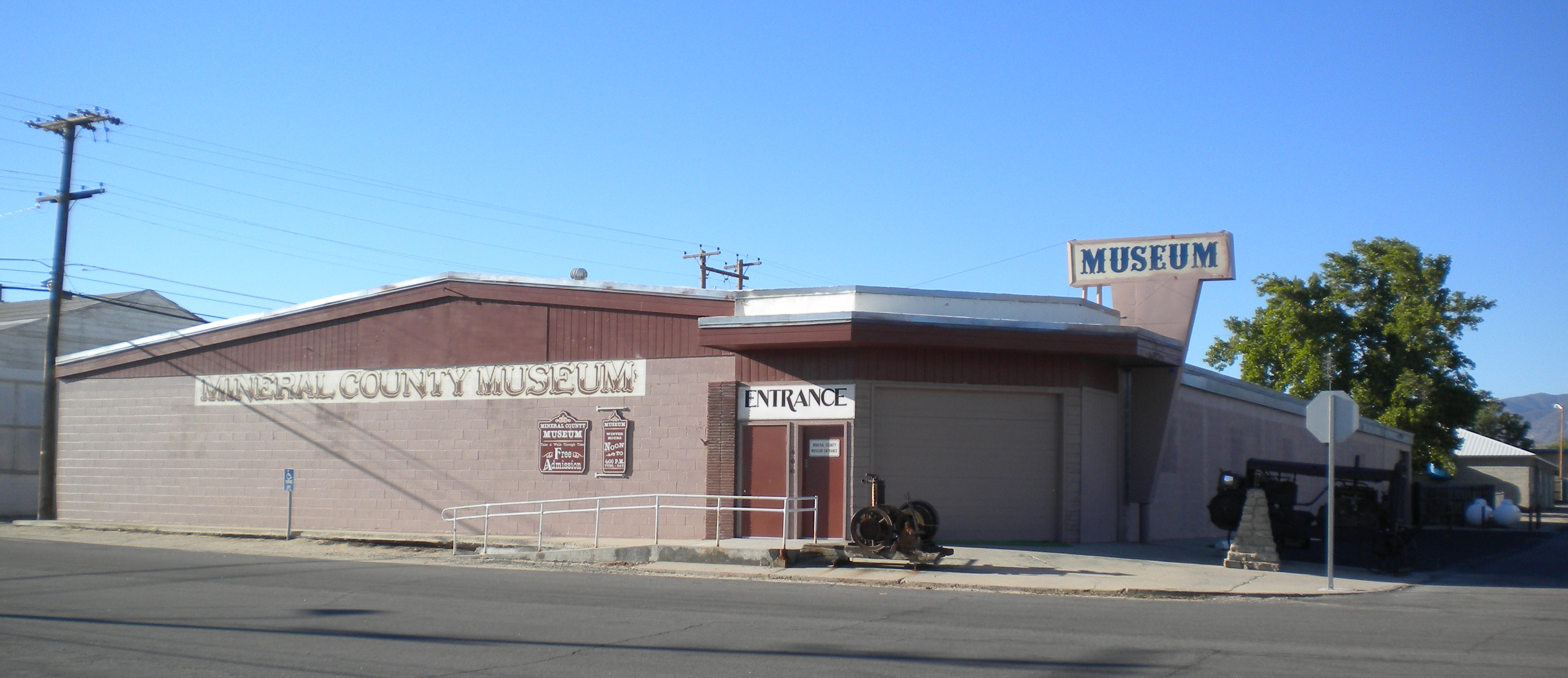
- Location: 400 Tenth Street; Hawthorne, Nevada
- Type: History
- Website: Mineral County Museum website

The Mineral County Museum is located at 400 Tenth Street, Hawthorne, Nevada. It has over 15,000 square feet of display space. The collection includes antique clothing, mining equipment, minerals, photographs, horse-drawn carriages, and fire equipment.
