= Radar Bomb Scoring =

Air force trainee bomb accuracy test

Radar Bomb Scoring is a combat aviation ground support operation used to evaluate Cold War aircrews' effectiveness with simulated unguided bomb drops near radar stations of the United States Navy, the USAF Strategic Air Command, and Army Project Nike units. USAF RBS used various ground radar, computers, and other electronic equipment such as jammers to disrupt operations of the bomber's radar navigator, AAA/SAM simulators to require countermeasures from the bomber, and Radar Bomb Scoring Centrals for estimating accuracy of simulated bombings. Scores for accuracy and electronic warfare effectiveness were transmitted from radar sites such as those at Strategic Range Training Complexes (e.g., from Detachment 1 at the "La Junta Bomb Plot").

Most of the SAC sites were in the continental US with units (detachments) manned by technicians and operators of the Automatic Tracking Radar Specialist career field (AutoTrack). Radar Bomb Scoring and the Autotrack specialty were discontinued shortly after the end of the Cold War when increased munitions accuracy (e.g., GPS-guided JDAMs 1st used in 1993) reduced the need for scoring of simulated bomb runs, and GPS avionics allow onboard tracking for "no-drop bomb scoring" of unguided bombs.

== History ==
World War II included Army Air Forces Bombardier Schools' scoring of trainee's proficiency at the "West Texas Bombardier Triangle" and other USAAF ranges (e.g., observers on Range Towers), and ground-directed bombing for combat guided by automatic tracking radars was used in the Mediterranean Theatre's Po Valley. On 6 June 1945 "the 206th Army Air Force Base Unit (RBS) (206th AAFBU), was activated at Colorado Springs, Colorado under the command of Colonel Robert W. Burns [with] operational control of the two SCR-584 radar detachments located at Kansas City and Fort Worth Army Airfield (Det B), and dets were later "established at Denver, Chicago, Omaha, Albuquerque and [c. 1952 at] Los Angeles." USAF RBS units were at MacDill AFB in 1947, in Phoenix in 1952, and Guam in 1954.

=== Strategic Air Command ===
RBS by Strategic Air Command began with the last of 888 simulated bomb runs against San Diego scored in 1946 as well as 2,499 runs scored in 1947. The 1948 increase to 12,084 was the result of a "scathing" Lindbergh review of SAC in the Spring of 1948 (SAC's commanding general was replaced 15 October, and January 1949 simulated raids by Curtis LeMay's "entire command" on Wright-Patt AFB "were appalling"). On 21 July 1948, the 263rd AAFBU (RBS) had been renamed the 3903rd Radar Bomb Scoring Squadron (SAC), and early RBS detachments were designated by letters, e.g., Detachment D at Fort George Wright WA in 1950. Three detachments of the 3903rd RBS deployed for ground directed bombing in Korea at "Tactical Air Direction Posts" (colloq. TADPOLE sites). (10 August 1954, the 3933rd Radar Bomb Scoring Squadron was redesignated the 11th Radar Bomb Scoring Squadron.) In 1955, RBS bomb runs for the SAC Bombing and Navigation Competition were on Amarillo, Denver, Salt Lake City, Kansas City, and San Antonio (Phoenix also had runs) and in 1957, SAC installed RBS sites for the competition (named "Operation Longshot") which had 3 targets: Atlanta, Kansas City, and St. Louis. The c. 1963 "Goldwater congressional investigation" investigated working and travel conditions at the Lynchburg, Virginia, detachment, which was a mobile unit that had temporary radar stations at "Blackstone, Staunton and Farmville before [being] shut ... down". c. 1960, Det 3 at Heston Aerodrome, England, moved to the Fairey Aviation Plant at Langley.

=== Army & Navy RBS ===
By 1960, USAF RBS equipment had been incorporated in US Army Course Directing Centrals for Project Nike (i.e., receivers for telecommunicated tones to indicate the aircraft's bomb release on the Nike radar plotting boards). Nike RBS of SAC/ADCOM bombers used USAF personnel on temporary duty to calculate the simulated bomb run score from the track by a Nike missile crew/radar (e.g., at the Chicago-Gary Defense Area). In 1961, Nike units "scored 1,890 practice bomb runs" and in 1962 the NIKE site at Maitland/Lake Park in Milwaukee was RBSing. Four Navy Radar Bomb Scoring Units during the Cold War included those near Spokane, Washington, and at the Pachino Radar Bomb Scoring Range near Naples, Italy. After the 10th Radar Bomb Scoring Squadron's RBS Express train had been used in 1961 near the Hawthorne Army Ammunition Plant, SAC's Hawthorne Bomb Plot in nearby Babbitt also scored bomb runs of US Navy aircraft (e.g., out of Naval Air Station Fallon).

On 1 August 1961, SAC's 1st Radar Bomb Scoring Group at Carswell AFB merged with the 3908th Strategic Standardization Group to form the 1st Combat Evaluation Group at Barksdale AFB. Manual RBS "bomb scoring projector" computation of "the bomb problem" with scale, protractor, E6B computer, and bombing tables" was replaced with computerized bomb trajectory integration by the 1965 Reeves AN/MSQ-77 Bomb Directing Central developed for Vietnam War Combat Skyspot bombing. The Bayshore Bomb Plot in Michigan (formerly located in Ironwood, Michigan) was destroyed by a television fire on 26 December 1967, and in 1969, the Combat Skyspot Trophy was first "awarded annually to the most outstanding [RBS] detachment in the 1st Combat Evaluation Group".

At least 1 of the SAC RBS sites was operating until mid-1994 when Wilder Radar Bomb Scoring Site closed after the 1993 Base Realignment and Closure Commission. In 2005, USAF RBS records were designated for destruction "10 years after inactivation of site".

=== Post-Cold War bomb scoring ===
The Northrop T-38C was upgraded to have no-drop bomb scoring capability in 2007 by estimating the impact from the onboard GPS-calculated position of release, and the United States Marine Corps had no-drop bomb scoring at Yuma Proving Ground in 2010. At least 1 Strategic Air Command RBS site continues as an electronic warfare range—the Belle Fourche Electronic Scoring Site in Powder River Military Operations Area with Infrared Enhance Targets and Unmanned Threat Emitters (the site's call sign remains "Belle Fourche Bomb Plot").

== USAF Equipment ==
- Bomb Scoring Centrals: SCR-584+RC294, AN/MSQ-1 (AN/MPS-9+OA-132), AN/MSQ-1A (ANMPS-19+OA-626), AN/MSQ-2 (−9+OA-215), AN/MSQ-35, AN/MSQ-39, AN/MSQ-77, AN/TPS-43, AN/TSQ-35, AN/TSQ-81, AN/TSQ-96
- Simulators: AN/MPQ-T3 (AAA), AN/MPS-T1, AN/MST-T1, AN/VPQ-1 (TRTG)
- Jammers: AN/MLQ-T4, AN/TLQ-11

== See also ==
- Ironwood, Michigan
