= Title III =

Title III may refer to:

- Title III of the Americans with Disabilities Act of 1990, prohibiting discrimination on the basis of a disability in public accommodations
- Title III of the Higher Education Act of 1965, providing institutional aid to colleges that serve a significant number of low-income and minority students
- Title III of the Older Americans Act of 1965 (OAA), providing grants to American states and territories to fund nutrition services programs for adults older than 65
- Elementary and Secondary Education Act, Title III Part A, a United States federal grant program to improve education (U.S. Elementary and Secondary Education Act of 1965)
- Jumpstart Our Business Startups Act, the 2015 equity crowdfunding rules
- USA PATRIOT Act, Title III, the 2001 money laundering law
- Omnibus Crime Control and Safe Streets Act of 1968, the 1968 wiretap law
- Title 3 of the Code of Federal Regulations
- Title 3 of the United States Code
