= Hawthorne Ordnance Museum =

Museum in Nevada, United States

Coordinates: 38.5311°N 118.6249°W

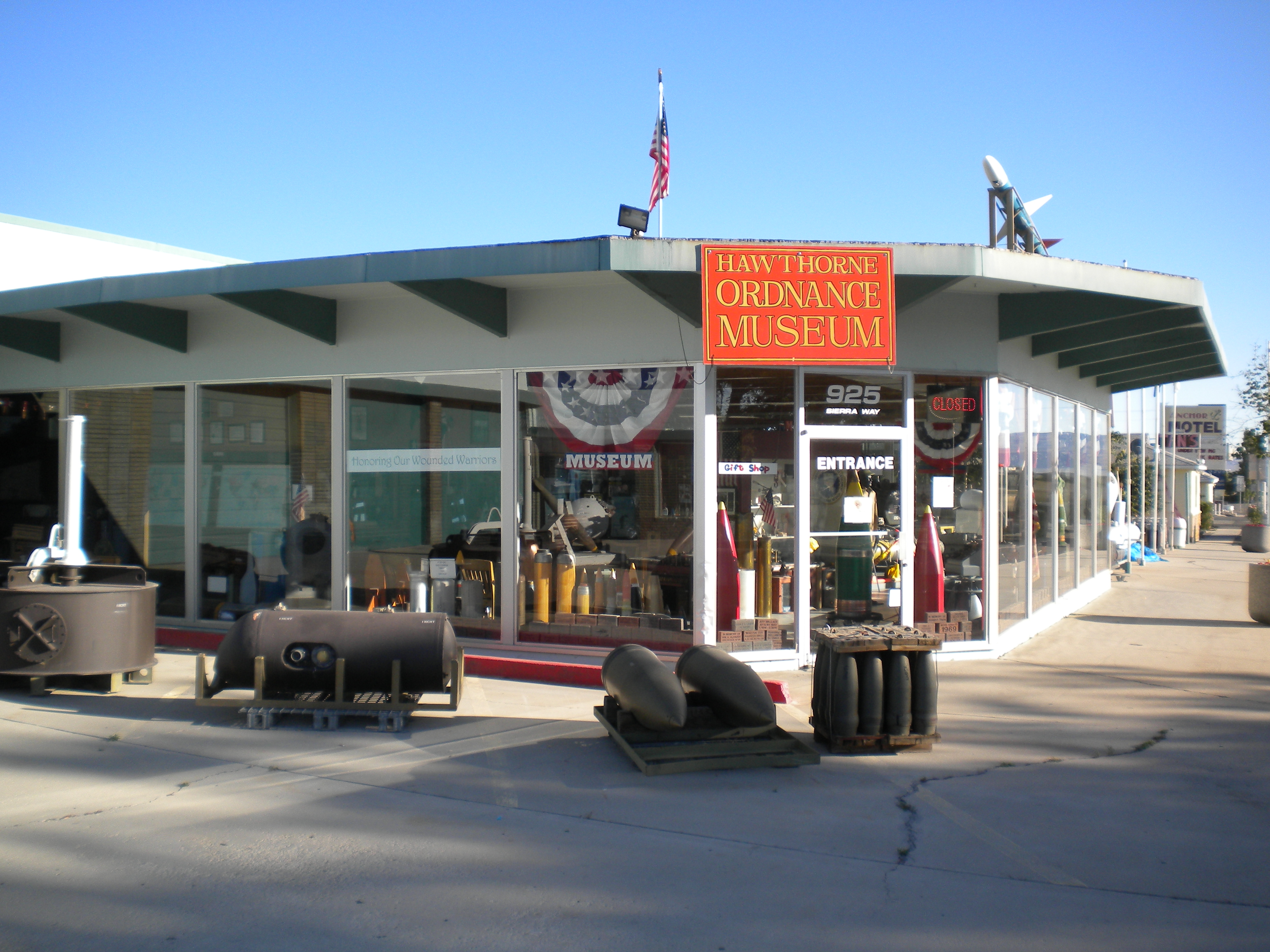
- Location: 925 E Street; Hawthorne, Nevada
- Type: Military
- Website: official website

The Hawthorne Ordnance Museum is located at 925 E Street, Hawthorne, Nevada. The museum showcases various demilitarized ammunition and other military equipment belonging to the United States Navy and the United States Army which were manufactured and stored in an ammunition depot based in Hawthorne. The museum is operated by a local non-profit organization.

== History ==
The museum's history dates back to when Hawthorne housed the Naval Ammunition Depot in 1928. The depot was originally located in New Jersey, but following an explosion which claimed the lives of 21 people, it was decided that the depot needs to be moved to a more remote location populated with fewer residents. During World War II, the depot played a significant role in housing ammunition for the Pacific War. By 1977, the depot no longer served the U.S. Navy and was operated by the U.S. Army instead.

== Collection ==
The majority of the museum's collection came from the ammunition depot, specialized demilitarized ammunitions used in wars during the 20th century. Other displays of the museum include military uniforms, newspaper archives, as well as photographs.

== See also ==
- Fort Churchill State Historic Park
- List of museums in Nevada
- National Atomic Testing Museum
- Old Las Vegas Mormon Fort State Historic Park
