= Formerly Used Defense Sites =

Abandoned defense properties

Formerly Used Defense Sites (FUDS or FDS) are properties that were owned by, leased to, or otherwise possessed by the United States and under the jurisdiction of the United States Secretary of Defense. The term also refers to the U.S. military program created in 1986 for assessment and environmental restoration, if any, led by the U.S. Army Corps of Engineers.

== Overview ==
Of the potential 10,000 FUDS that have been used for military training, production, installation and testing of weapon systems the U.S. military has reviewed over 9,800 sites in the US and its territories for contamination by the Department of Defense, around 2700 of these properties were determined to be in need of environmental cleanup with restoration projects planned or ongoing, at an estimated cost of $14–18 billion.

== Regulations ==
The Defense Environmental Restoration Program statute (10 USC 2701) and the Comprehensive Environmental Response, Compensation, and Liabilities Act CERCLA direct the assessment, eligibility for clean up, and clean up; as does the National Oil and Hazardous Substances Pollution Contingency Plan. One funding eligibility criterion is that the contamination must have occurred prior to 17 October 1986. EPA determines if a site qualifies as Superfund site to be listed on the National Priority List (NPL)L per National Contingency Plan (NCP), 40 CFR Part 300. If it is not listed on NPL, the state or tribe is the lead regulator while DoD is the lead agency.

== Sites ==
- Salt Lake City Radar Bomb Scoring Site

== See also ==
- Agent Orange
- Environmental impact of war
- Superfund
