= Hawthorne Army Depot =

Facility of the US Army Joint Munitions Command

Coordinates: 38°28′37″N 118°39′28″W

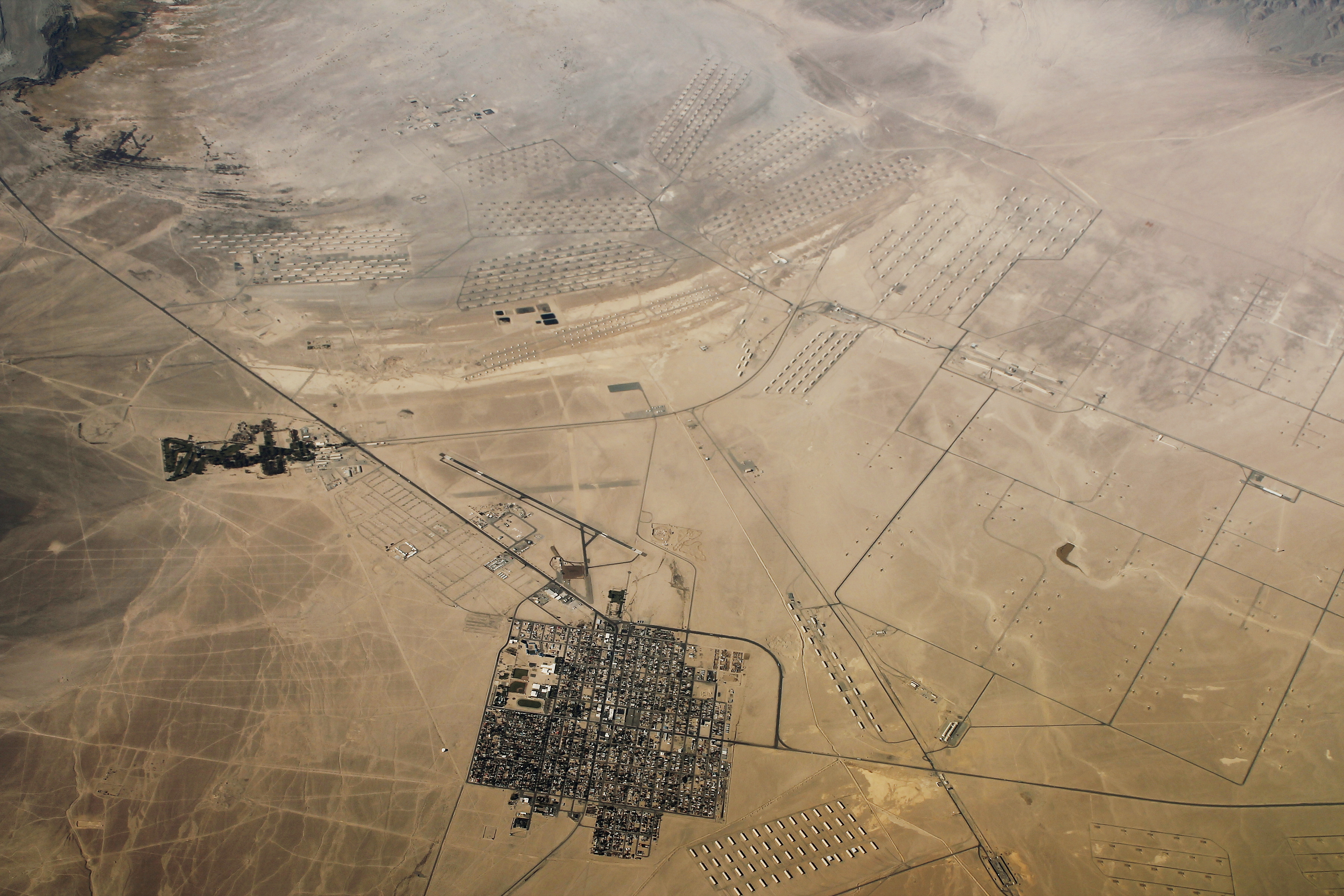
Aerial view of Hawthorne, Nevada and the army depot

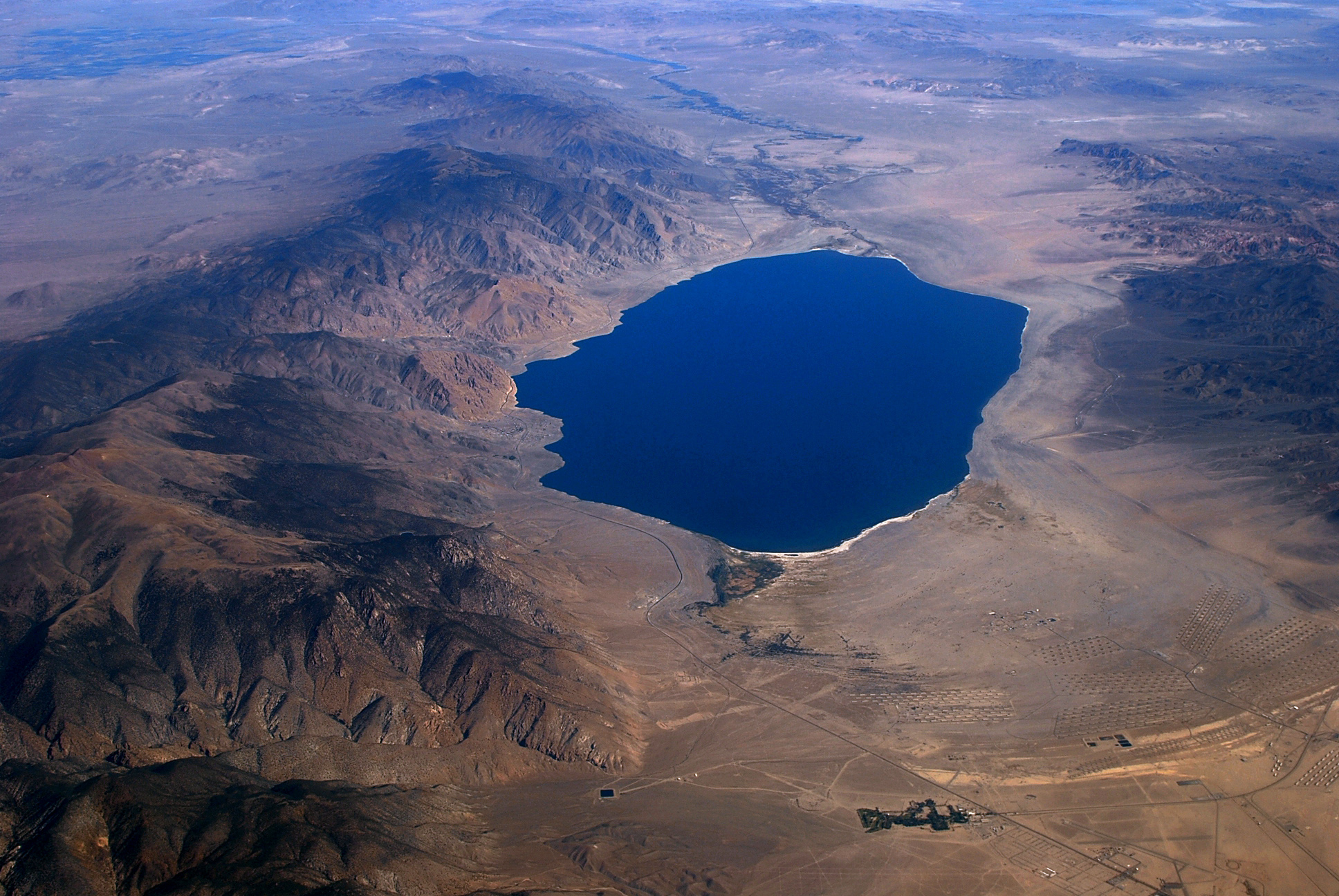
Aerial View of Hawthorne Army Depot with Walker Lake to the north (above) and Mount Grant to the west (left).

Hawthorne Army Depot (HWAD) is a U.S. Army Joint Munitions Command ammunition storage depot located near the town of Hawthorne in western Nevada in the United States. It is directly south of Walker Lake. The depot covers 147,000 acres (59,000 ha) or 226 square miles (590 km^{2}) and has 600,000 square feet (56,000 m^{2}) storage space in 2,427 bunkers. HWAD is the "World's Largest Depot". It is divided into three ammunition storage and production areas, plus an industrial area housing command headquarters, facilities, engineering shops, etc.

The depot was established as Naval Ammunition Depot Hawthorne in September 1930. It was redesignated as the Hawthorne Army Ammunition Plant in 1977 when it was transferred from United States Navy to United States Army control as part of the United States Department of Defense's Single Manager for Conventional Ammunition. In 1994, it ended the production of ammunition and became Hawthorne Army Depot.

== Description ==
Hawthorne Army Depot stores reserve ammunitions to be used after the first 30 days of a major conflict. It is only partially staffed during peacetime, but provision has been made to rapidly expand staffing as necessary. An independent contractor runs the depot under an agreement with the United States Government.

The center's capabilities include demilitarization, desert training for military units, ammunition renovation, quality assurance, ISO intermodal container maintenance and repair, and range scrap processing.

== History ==
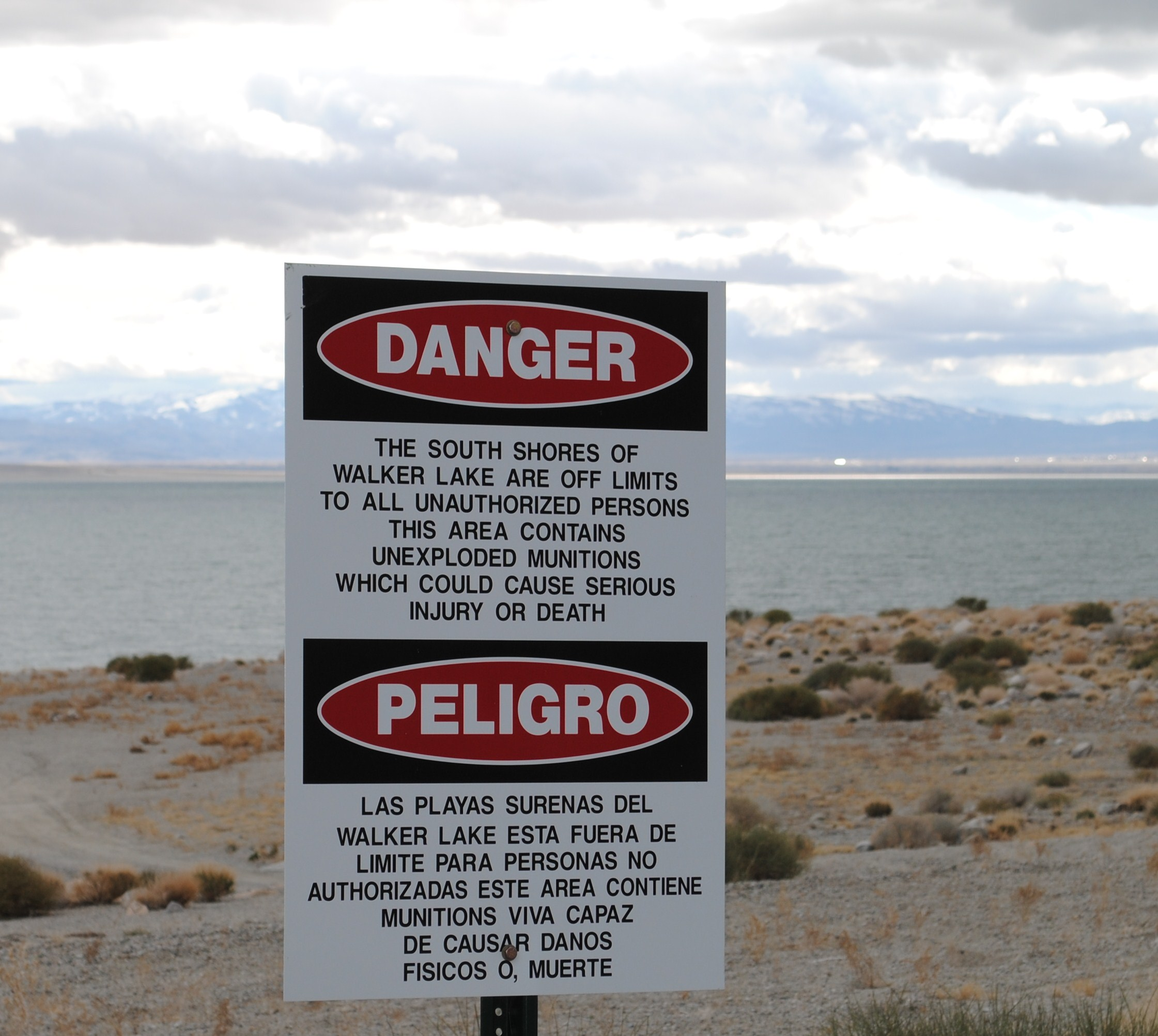
Warning of unexploded munitions from Hawthorne Army Depot in Walker Lake.

A major disaster occurred at the United States Navy's Lake Denmark Naval Ammunition Depot in New Jersey in 1926. The accident virtually destroyed the depot, causing heavy damage to the adjacent Picatinny Arsenal and the surrounding communities, killing 21 people and seriously injuring 53 others. The monetary loss to the Navy alone was US$84 million, the equivalent of just over US$1 billion in 2007, mostly due to the loss of explosives consumed in the disaster. As a result of a full-scale United States Congressional investigation, the 70th United States Congress in 1928 directed that a Board of Officers be established to provide oversight of the storage conditions of explosives. A court of inquiry investigating the explosion recommended that a depot be established in a remote area within 1,000 miles (1,609 km) of the United States West Coast to serve the Pacific area.

In accordance with the court of inquiry's recommendation, construction of the Hawthorne Naval Ammunition Depot (NAD) began in July 1928 in a 327-square-mile (850 km^{2}) area of Nevada under U.S. Navy jurisdiction. The Hawthorne NAD opened in September 1930 and received its first shipment of high explosives on 19 October 1930. When the United States entered World War II in December 1941, the depot became the staging area for bombs, rockets, and ammunition for almost the entire war effort. Employment was at its highest at 5,625 in 1945. By 1948, the Hawhorne NAD occupied about 104 square miles (269 km^{2}) of the 327-square-mile (850 km^{2}) area. Subsequently, excess U.S. Navy lands were turned over to the United States Department of the Interior's Bureau of Land Management.

The mission and functions at the Hawthorne NAD remained the same throughout the facility's history. The mission, as stated in a 1962 Navy Command History, was to "receive, renovate, maintain, store and issue ammunition, explosives, expendable ordnance items and/or weapons and technical ordnance material and perform additional tasks as directed by the Bureau of Naval Weapons." It also served as an important ammunition center during the Korean War (June 1950–July 1953) and the Vietnam War (1964–1973), with several thousand structures on 236 square miles (610 km^{2}) of land. Stored ammunition that had been examined and repacked was given the code "HAW" followed by the last two digits of the year (e.g., "HAW 50" in 1950).

The United States Marine Corps provided security for the 3,000 bunkers at Hawthorne NAD. In September 1930 and during World War II (December 1941–August 1945) 600 Marines were assigned to the facility. By 1977, that number had dropped to 117.

In 1977, NAD was transferred to the United States Army and renamed the Hawthorne Army Ammunition Plant (HWAAP). In 1980, the HWAAP was redesignated as a United States Government-owned contractor-operated facility. Day & Zimmermann Hawthorne Corporation (DZHC) is the current operating contractor, having won the contract over three other bidders, namely Aerojet Services, Mason & Knight, and the British-owned ICI America, by proposing the lowest price for the plant's operation. The award was announced on 5 August 1980. In 1994, the facility was renamed the Hawthorne Army Depot (HWAD). Security is contracted to a private company.

In 1998–1999, the facility was used to destroy the U.S. stockpile of M687 chemical artillery shells and separate their 505 short tons (458 metric tons; 451 long tons) of binary precursor chemicals from them.

In May 2005, the facility was included on the 2005 Base Realignment and Closure (BRAC) list, with closure being recommended. However, the depot was subsequently dropped from the BRAC list, primarily due to the base's capability to support pre-deployment training for Operation Enduring Freedom-bound U.S. Marine Corps units (by the Mountain Warfare Training Center) as well as Navy and Army special operations forces.

On 18 March 2013, seven U.S. Marines were killed and at least eight were wounded when a mortar exploded during a live-fire training exercise at the Hawthorne Army Depot. Because of the accident, the Pentagon suspended use of the M224 mortar round pending an investigation. As a result of the investigation, the explosion was deemed to have been as a result of human error and the suspension was lifted.

Currently, United States Marine Corps Reserve personnel from the 4th Marine Logistics Group conduct annual training exercises at the Hawthorne Army Depot as well as in its surrounding desert areas.

== Local community ==
Hawthorne Army Depot surrounds the small town of Hawthorne, Nevada, where most of its employees reside. Before the facility became contractor-operated, it was staffed primarily by United States federal civil service workers and military personnel who were housed on government-owned property neighboring Hawthorne, including the now-abandoned town of Babbitt and military housing known as Schweer Drive. During the peak of operations in World War II, additional housing was provided in a former Civilian Conservation Corps camp christened "Camp Jumbo," and in a large adjoining construction camp. The local Sixth Street School (whose building is listed on the National Register of Historic Places) was expanded to serve the growing population.

The housing in Babbitt was made up of large buildings designed as duplexes. The system of trusses in the buildings allowed all interior walls to be removed without compromising their structure. Since the disposal of Babbitt many of these "Babbitt Houses" have been moved to rural areas in many parts of Nevada for use in various ways.
