= RBS Express =

Portable railway-based radar stations

External image
- acquisition radar on railcar

RBS Express sites

1961 Mar 1 (1st): Milan, Tennessee
1961 (11th RBS): Rhame, North Dakota
tbd: Bowman, North Dakota
1961: McAlester, Oklahoma
1961 December (#2): Hawthorne, Nevada
1962 January: Greenville, Texas
1962 April: Athens, Georgia
1962 May: Jalapa, South Carolina
1962 June: Barksdale AFB, Louisiana
1963 Jan: Worthington, Minnesota
1963 Mar-May: Deeth, Nevada
1963 (# "III"): Jalapa, South Carolina
1963 May-Jun (1st): depot
1963 June (1st): Minnesota
tbd: Corsicana, Texas
1964 Jan: Emhouse, Texas
1964 Jan-Mar: Thoreau, New Mexico
tbd: Crane, Indiana
1964 Sep: Moulton, Iowa
1965: Scott City, Kansas
1965 Apr-Sep: Newport, Arkansas (3rd time)
1966 Oct: Wendell, Idaho
1966-67: Rion, South Carolina
1968 February (w/ MSQ-39): Wellsville, Missouri
1968 May: Naicom, Saskatchewan
1968-9: Ritzville, Washington
1969: Lawen, Oregon
1970 May: Saskatoon, Canada
1970-1: "Green River Site", Utah

RBS Express railroad trains were 3 mobile United States Air Force radar stations for 1CEVG Radar Bomb Scoring (RBS) of Strategic Air Command bomber crews beginning in March 1961. Electronic equipment included the "MSQ-39, TLQ-11, MPS-9, and the IFF/SIF for the MSQ-39" along with support railcars ("work train"), and the trains were temporarily used at various rail sites (e.g., sidings) with the radar antennas emplaced using hoists built onto flatcars. Pulled by a "contracted locomotive" that left the train at the site (e.g., for 45 days), and a North American B-25 Mitchell was used for calibration of the radar station.

Each train used "existing U.S. Army stock" from Ogden General Depot, and each train's 21 cars (17 support and 4 radar cars) included "a generator car, two box cars (one for radar equipment maintenance, and one for support maintenance) [a] dining car, two day-room cars, supply cars, admin car, and 4 [crew sleeping cars]." Depot maintenance for the trains was at the Tooele Army Depot southwest of Salt Lake City ("Army Rail Shops"). Major Eugene R. Butler was the 1st commander of the "First RBS Express", and each 1CEVG squadron's detachments manned a train (after the 1965 discontinuation of RBS squadrons, RBS detachments continued operating trains.) Butler's command had 60 11th RBS airmen: 15 from the Joplin Bomb Plot and others from the bomb plots at La Junta CO, Bismarck ND, Minneapolis MN, Salt Lake City UT, St Louis MO, and Little Rock AR.
