= Hawthorne, Nevada =

- Unincorporated town Census-designated place
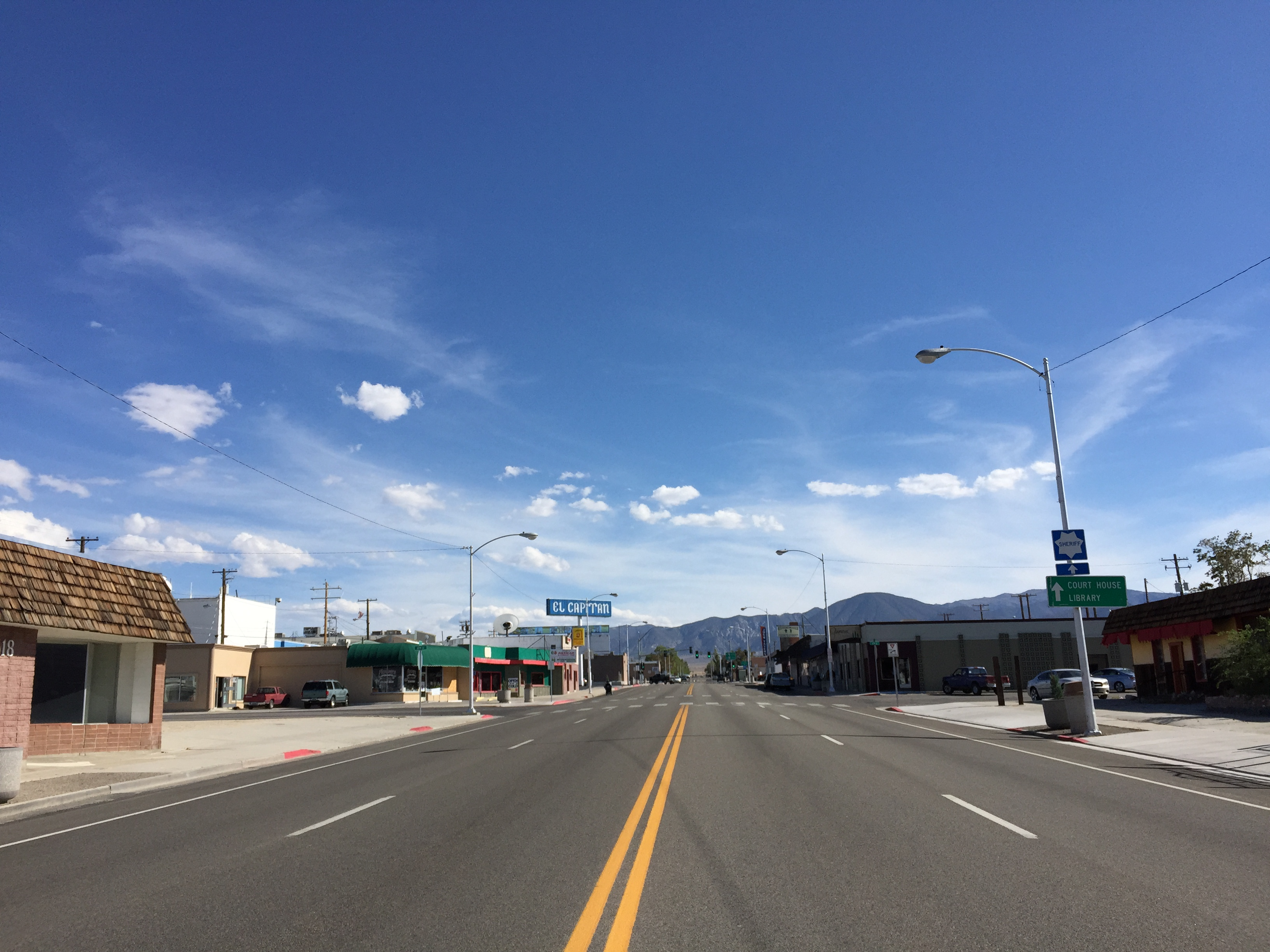
- E Street (U.S. Route 95) in downtown Hawthorne

- Location in Mineral County and the state of Nevada

- Location in the United States
- Coordinates: 38°31′31″N 118°37′23″W
- Country: United States
- State: Nevada
- County: Mineral
- Founded: 1880; 146 years ago
- Named for: William Hawthorne

Area
  - Total: 1.76 sq mi (4.56 km^{2})
  - Land: 1.76 sq mi (4.56 km^{2})
  - Water: 0 sq mi (0.00 km^{2})
- Elevation: 4,330 ft (1,320 m)

Population (2020)
  - Total: 3,118
  - Density: 1,772.6/sq mi (684.39/km^{2})
- Time zone: UTC−8 (PST)
  - Summer (DST): UTC−7 (PDT)
- ZIP code: 89415
- Area code: 775
- FIPS code: 32-31300
- GNIS feature ID: 0848558

Nevada Historical Marker
- Reference no.: 60

Hawthorne is an unincorporated town and census-designated place (CDP) in Mineral County, Nevada, United States. As of the 2020 census, the population was 3,118. It is the county seat of Mineral County. The nearby Hawthorne Army Depot is the primary economic base of the town.

== History ==
The first permanent settlement at Hawthorne was established in 1880.

The townsite was selected in 1880 by H. M. Yerington, president of the Carson and Colorado Railroad Co. as a division and distribution site for the new railroad.

The location was adjacent to the important Knapp's Station and Ferry Landing on the busy Esmeralda Toll Road from Wadsworth to Candelaria. Connecting roads were built to all of the surrounding mining areas.

H. M. Yerington named the new town "Hawthorne" after a lumberman, rancher, and law enforcement friend he knew in Carson City. The first train arrived on April 14, 1881, loaded with prospective buyers for the new town lots.

In 1883, Hawthorne took the Esmeralda County seat from declining Aurora but later lost it to booming Goldfield. In 1911, it again became a county seat, this time for the new Mineral County.

== Geography ==
Hawthorne is nearly surrounded by the Hawthorne Army Depot and is bordered to the northwest by the remains of the community of Babbitt. U.S. Route 95 passes through the community, leading north 71 miles (114 km) to Fallon and southeast 103 miles (166 km) to Tonopah. Nevada State Route 359 leads southwest from Hawthorne 32 miles (51 km) to the California border, from where California State Route 167 continues 23 miles (37 km) to Mono City.

According to the U.S. Census Bureau, the Hawthorne CDP has a total area of 1.76 square miles (4.6 km^{2}), all land. Walker Lake is 7 miles (11 km) to the north, and the Wassuk Range overlooks the town from the west. The highest point in the range and in Mineral County, 11,239-foot (3,426 m) Mount Grant, is 9 miles (14 km) northwest of Hawthorne.

=== Climate ===
Hawthorne has a cool arid climate (Köppen BWk) featuring hot to sweltering summers and chilly winters. The powerful rain shadow of the Sierra Nevada and remoteness from the Gulf of Mexico and the North American Monsoon means precipitation is minimal throughout the year: no month averages so much as 0.70 inches or 18 millimeters. The wettest "rain year" was from July 1961 to June 1962 with 11.63 inches or 295.4 millimeters and the driest from July 2020 to June 2021 with 0.98 inches (24.9 mm). The most precipitation in one month has been 3.14 inches or 79.8 millimeters in May 1995. Although an average of 109 mornings each year fall below freezing, snow is extremely rare: the median annual snowfall is zero and the mean only 1.2 inches or 0.030 meters, although the very wet season from July 2022 to June 2023 saw a total accumulation of 28.8 inches or 0.73 meters.

The coldest recorded temperature has been −3 °F (−19.4 °C) on January 14, 1997; however, 0 °F or −17.8 °C has not been reached since December 23, 1998. In summer, 76 afternoons exceed 90 °F (32.2 °C) and eleven pass 100 °F (37.8 °C), whilst ten mornings remain above 68 °F or 20 °C. The hottest temperature in Hawthorne has been 110 °F (43.3 °C) recorded on July 16, 2023; the hottest minimum 81 °F (27.2 °C) on July 29, 1995.

Climate data for Hawthorne, Nevada, 1991–2020 normals, extremes 1954–present
Month	Jan	Feb	Mar	Apr	May	Jun	Jul	Aug	Sep	Oct	Nov	Dec	Year
Record high °F (°C)	73 (23)	75 (24)	86 (30)	94 (34)	101 (38)	105 (41)	110 (43)	105 (41)	105 (41)	93 (34)	80 (27)	76 (24)	110 (43)
Mean maximum °F (°C)	62.8 (17.1)	66.9 (19.4)	76.0 (24.4)	82.6 (28.1)	91.5 (33.1)	98.6 (37.0)	102.9 (39.4)	100.8 (38.2)	95.8 (35.4)	86.1 (30.1)	72.5 (22.5)	62.6 (17.0)	103.4 (39.7)
Mean daily maximum °F (°C)	47.8 (8.8)	52.9 (11.6)	61.7 (16.5)	67.4 (19.7)	77.0 (25.0)	86.9 (30.5)	95.4 (35.2)	93.1 (33.9)	84.5 (29.2)	71.2 (21.8)	56.7 (13.7)	47.2 (8.4)	70.2 (21.2)
Daily mean °F (°C)	37.0 (2.8)	41.3 (5.2)	48.5 (9.2)	53.4 (11.9)	62.4 (16.9)	71.5 (21.9)	79.4 (26.3)	77.3 (25.2)	69.1 (20.6)	56.7 (13.7)	44.5 (6.9)	36.5 (2.5)	56.5 (13.6)
Mean daily minimum °F (°C)	26.2 (−3.2)	29.7 (−1.3)	35.2 (1.8)	39.3 (4.1)	47.8 (8.8)	56.0 (13.3)	63.4 (17.4)	61.5 (16.4)	53.7 (12.1)	42.1 (5.6)	32.3 (0.2)	25.8 (−3.4)	42.8 (6.0)
Mean minimum °F (°C)	13.5 (−10.3)	16.9 (−8.4)	22.0 (−5.6)	27.1 (−2.7)	34.9 (1.6)	41.7 (5.4)	54.9 (12.7)	53.1 (11.7)	43.0 (6.1)	28.9 (−1.7)	18.5 (−7.5)	12.4 (−10.9)	9.3 (−12.6)
Record low °F (°C)	−3 (−19)	2 (−17)	14 (−10)	16 (−9)	25 (−4)	34 (1)	44 (7)	43 (6)	36 (2)	15 (−9)	6 (−14)	−2 (−19)	−3 (−19)
Average precipitation inches (mm)	0.43 (11)	0.35 (8.9)	0.47 (12)	0.31 (7.9)	0.66 (17)	0.27 (6.9)	0.35 (8.9)	0.19 (4.8)	0.11 (2.8)	0.35 (8.9)	0.42 (11)	0.24 (6.1)	4.15 (106.2)
Average snowfall inches (cm)	0.3 (0.76)	0.2 (0.51)	0.1 (0.25)	0.0 (0.0)	0.0 (0.0)	0.0 (0.0)	0.0 (0.0)	0.0 (0.0)	0.0 (0.0)	0.0 (0.0)	0.5 (1.3)	0.1 (0.25)	1.2 (3.07)
Average precipitation days (≥ 0.01 in)	2.8	2.4	2.3	2.1	3.0	1.6	2.1	1.6	1.2	1.6	2.2	2.5	25.4
Average snowy days (≥ 0.1 in)	0.3	0.2	0.2	0.0	0.0	0.0	0.0	0.0	0.0	0.0	0.1	0.1	0.9
Source 1: NOAA
Source 2: National Weather Service

== Demographics ==
Historical population
Census	Pop.	Note	%±
1950	1,861		—
1960	2,838		52.5%
1970	3,539		24.7%
1980	3,741		5.7%
1990	4,162		11.3%
2000	3,311		−20.4%
2010	3,269		−1.3%
2020	3,118		−4.6%
U.S. Decennial Census

=== 2020 census ===
As of the 2020 census, Hawthorne had a population of 3,118. The median age was 47.5 years. 19.5% of residents were under the age of 18 and 25.8% of residents were 65 years of age or older. For every 100 females there were 103.0 males, and for every 100 females age 18 and over there were 100.2 males age 18 and over.

0.0% of residents lived in urban areas, while 100.0% lived in rural areas.

There were 1,444 households in Hawthorne, of which 25.1% had children under the age of 18 living in them. Of all households, 35.9% were married-couple households, 26.6% were households with a male householder and no spouse or partner present, and 28.5% were households with a female householder and no spouse or partner present. About 37.7% of all households were made up of individuals and 17.4% had someone living alone who was 65 years of age or older.

There were 1,730 housing units, of which 16.5% were vacant. The homeowner vacancy rate was 1.7% and the rental vacancy rate was 10.0%.

Racial composition as of the 2020 census
Race	Number	Percent
White	2,406	77.2%
Black or African American	149	4.8%
American Indian and Alaska Native	88	2.8%
Asian	58	1.9%
Native Hawaiian and Other Pacific Islander	8	0.3%
Some other race	148	4.7%
Two or more races	261	8.4%
Hispanic or Latino (of any race)	364	11.7%

=== 2000 census ===
At the 2000 census there were 3,311 people, 1,465 households, and 937 families in the CDP. The population density was 2,234.9 inhabitants per square mile (862.9/km^{2}). There were 1,883 housing units at an average density of 1,271.0 per square mile (490.7/km^{2}). The racial makeup of the CDP was 83.6% White, 5.0% African American, 3.2% Native American, 1.5% Asian, 0.2% Pacific Islander, 2.7% from other races, and 3.8% from two or more races. Hispanic or Latino of any race were 9.7%.

Of the 1,465 households 24.9% had children under the age of 18 living with them, 46.4% were married couples living together, 11.2% had a female householder with no husband present, and 36.0% were non-families. 31.2% of households were one person and 15.2% were one person aged 65 or older. The average household size was 2.25 and the average family size was 2.74.

The age distribution was 22.9% under the age of 18, 6.6% from 18 to 24, 22.3% from 25 to 44, 27.5% from 45 to 64, and 20.6% 65 or older. The median age was 44 years. For every 100 females, there were 97.8 males. For every 100 females age 18 and over, there were 96.2 males.

The median income for a household in the CDP was $34,413, and the median income for a family was $41,733. Males had a median income of $31,344 versus $25,058 for females. The per capita income for the CDP was $17,830. About 8.6% of families and 10.8% of the population were below the poverty line, including 14.7% of those under age 18 and 8.0% of those age 65 or over.

== Education ==
Hawthorne has a public library, the Mineral County Library.

== Places of interest ==
- Hawthorne Army Depot
- Hawthorne Ordnance Museum
- Mineral County Museum
- Walker Lake

== Gallery ==
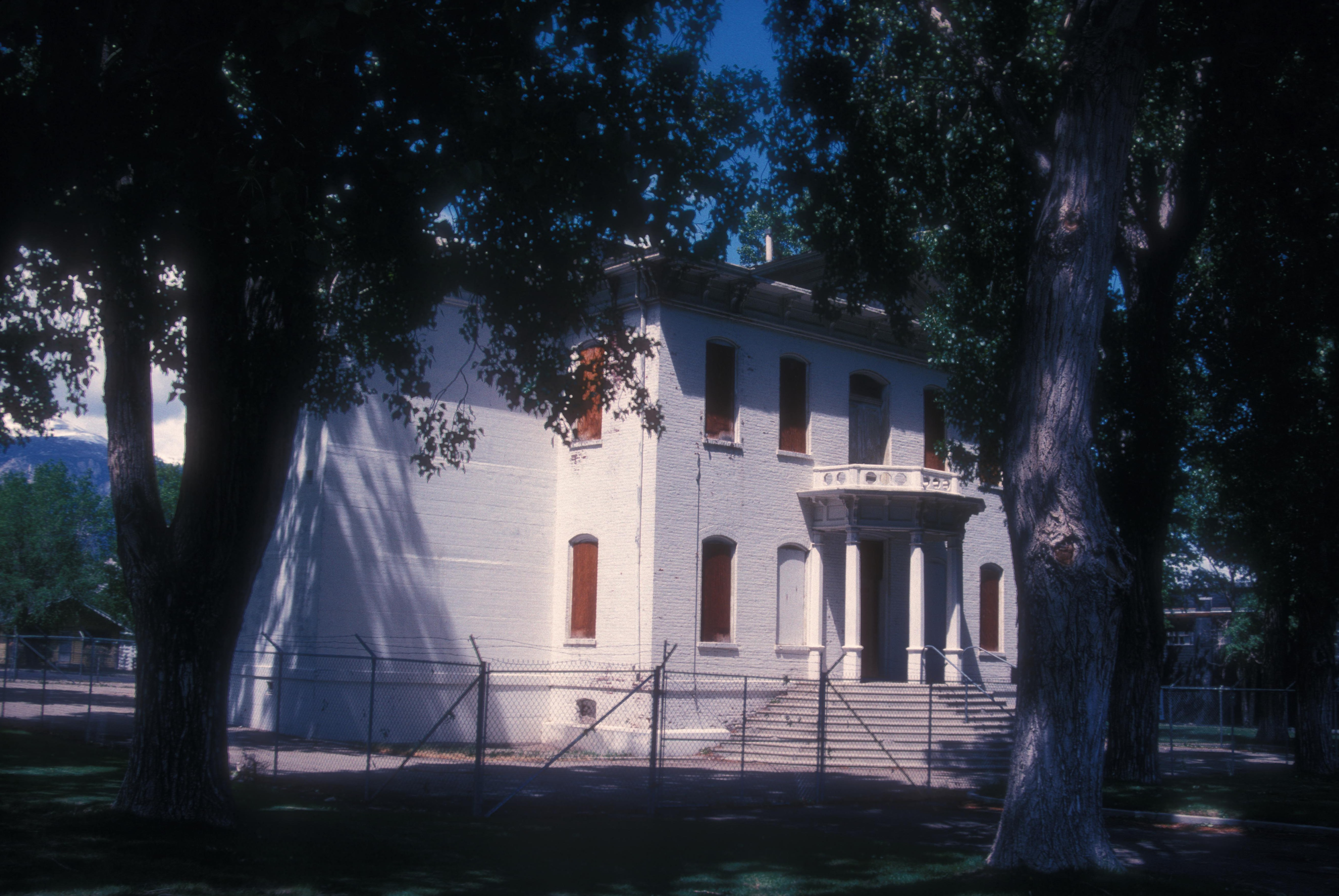
Mineral County Courthouse is listed on the National Register of Historic Places.

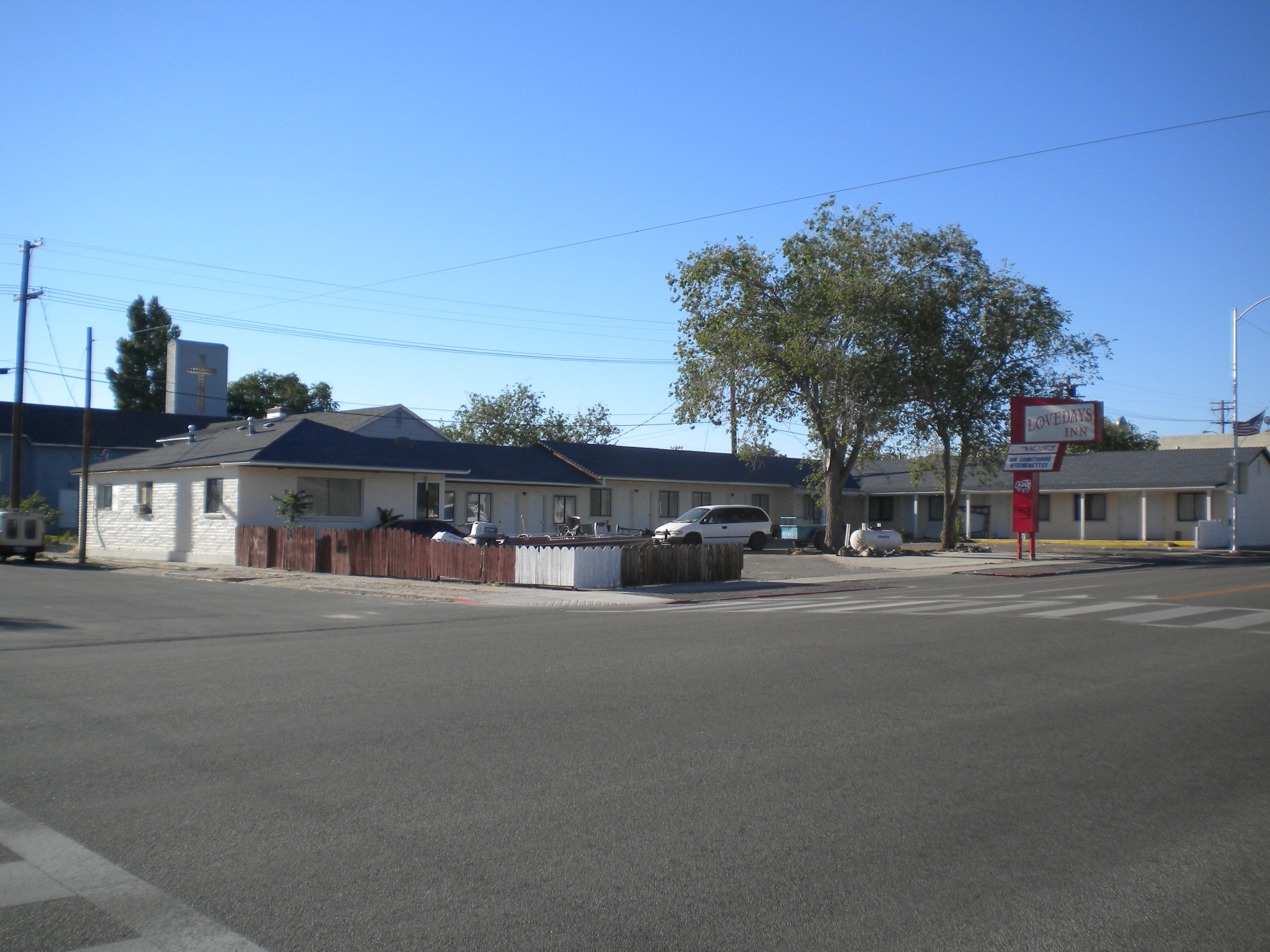
Lovedays Inn

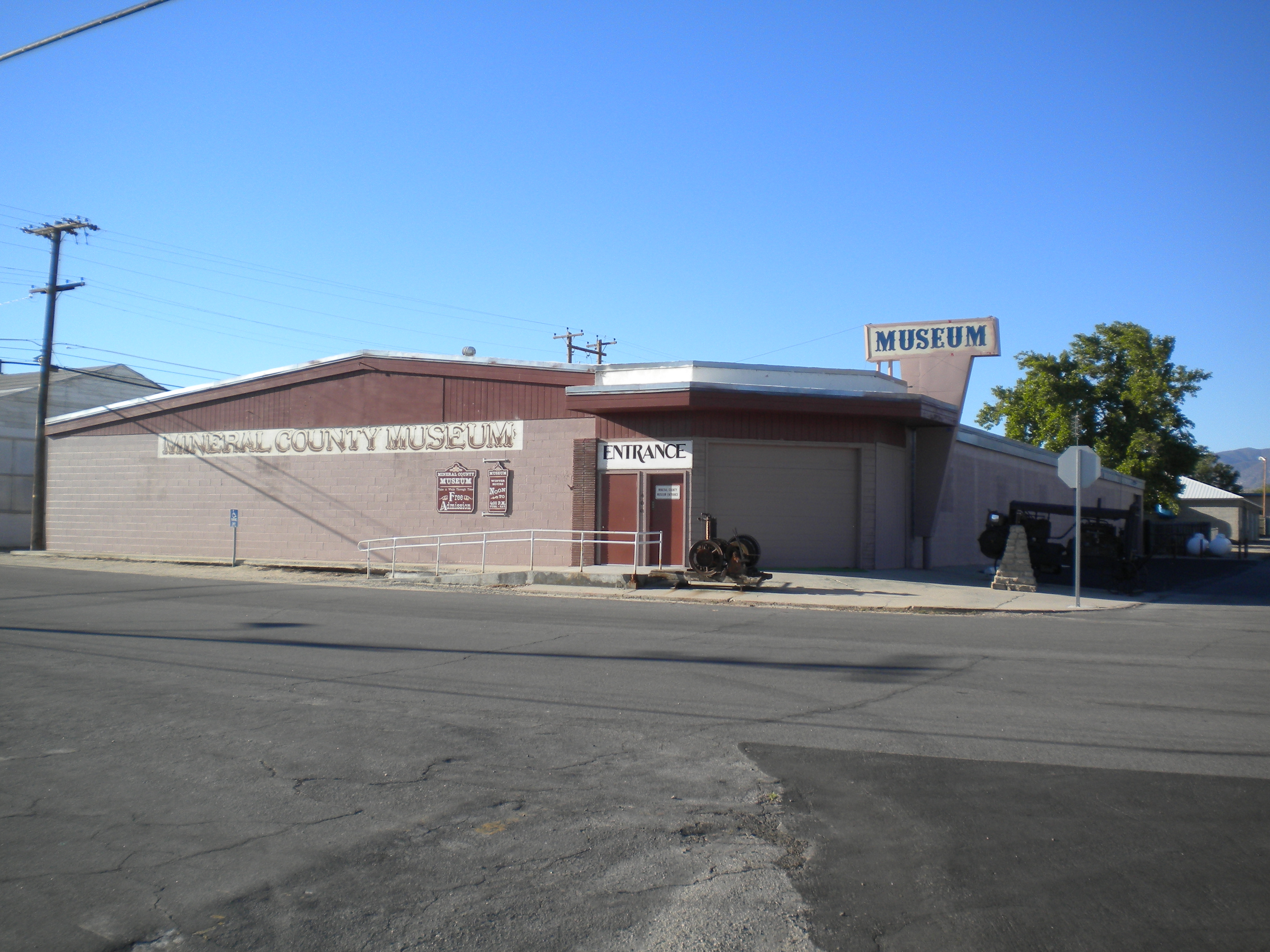
Mineral County Museum

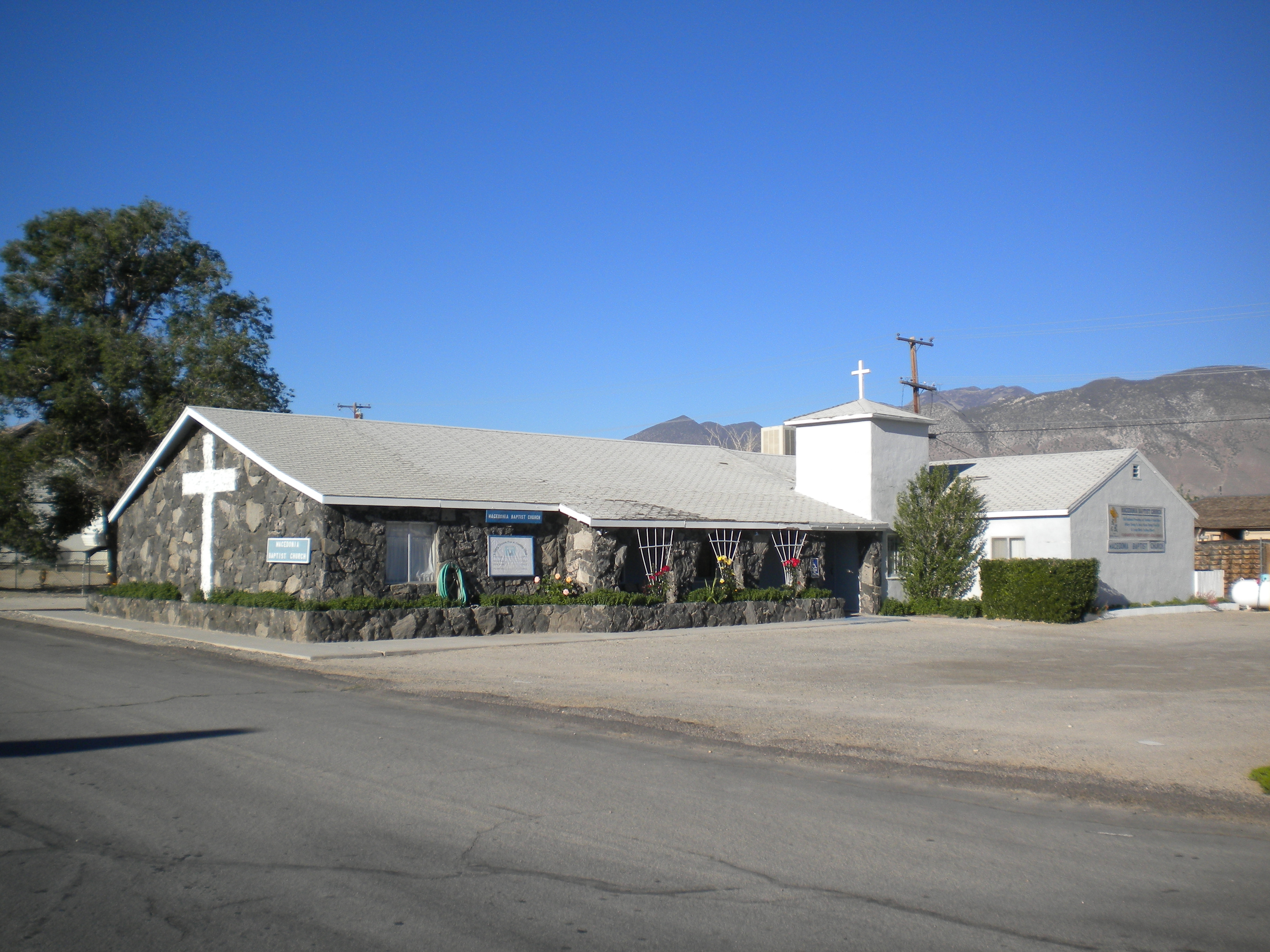
Macedonia Baptist Church

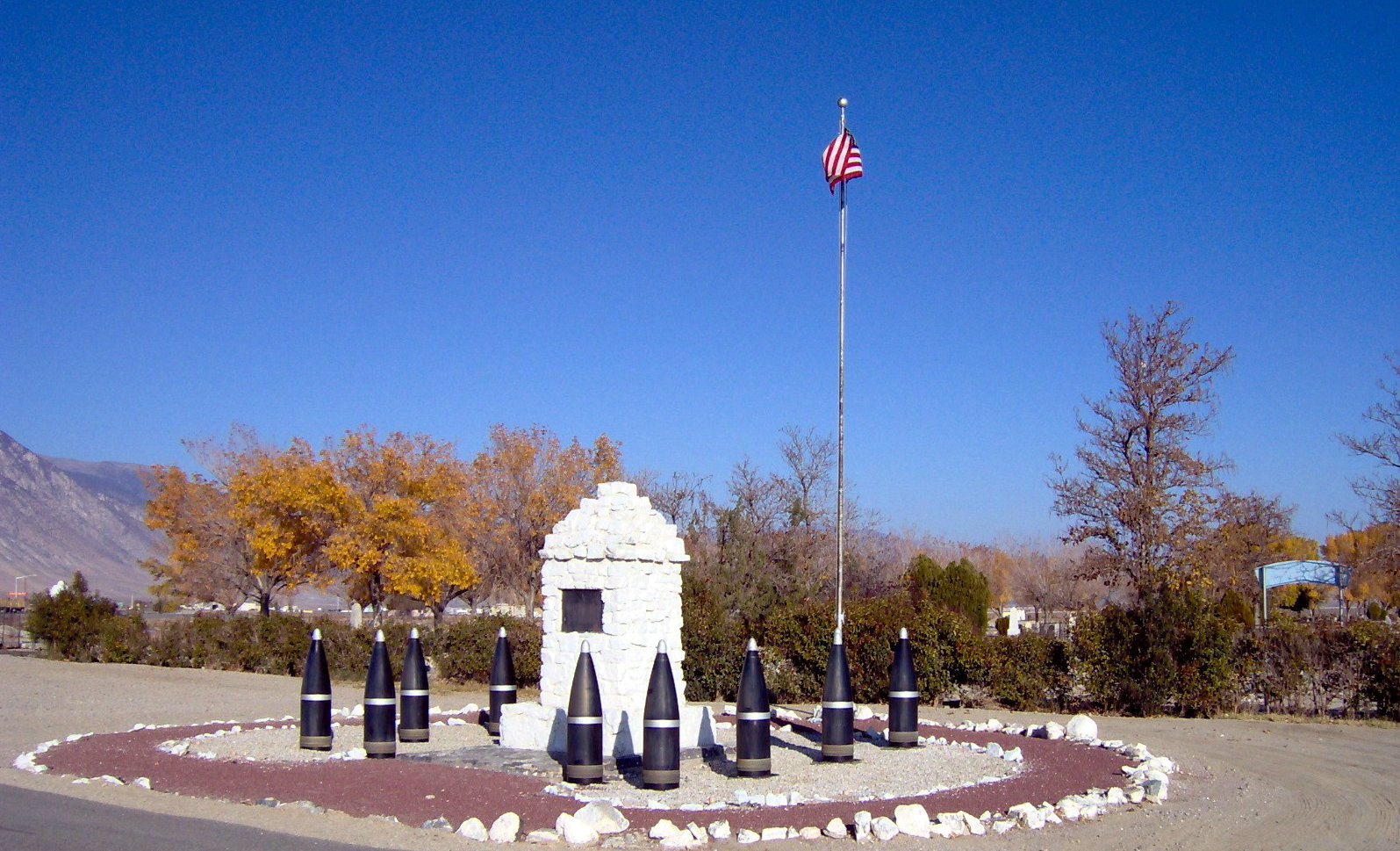
Soldiers' Memorial

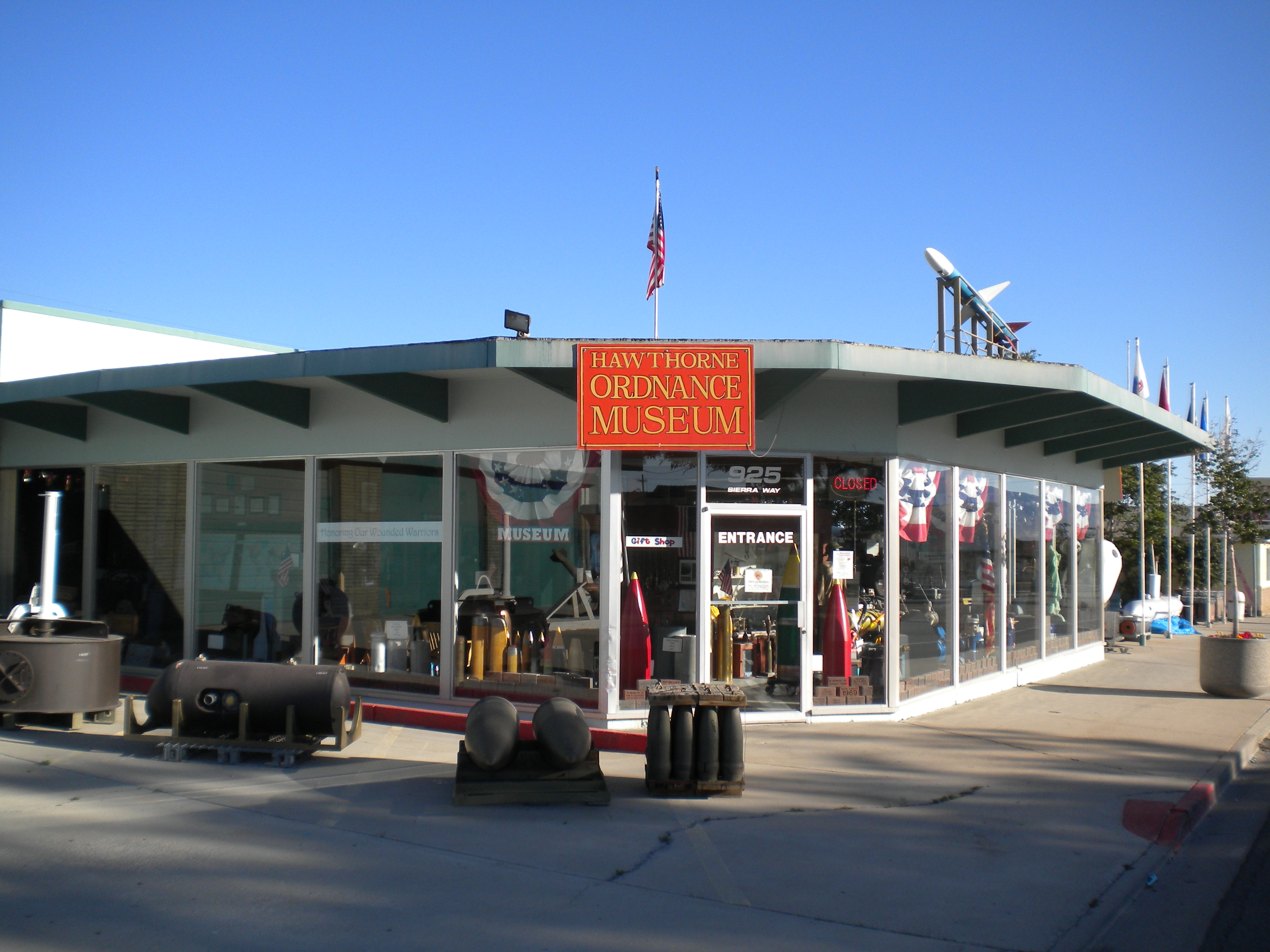
Hawthorne Ordnance Museum

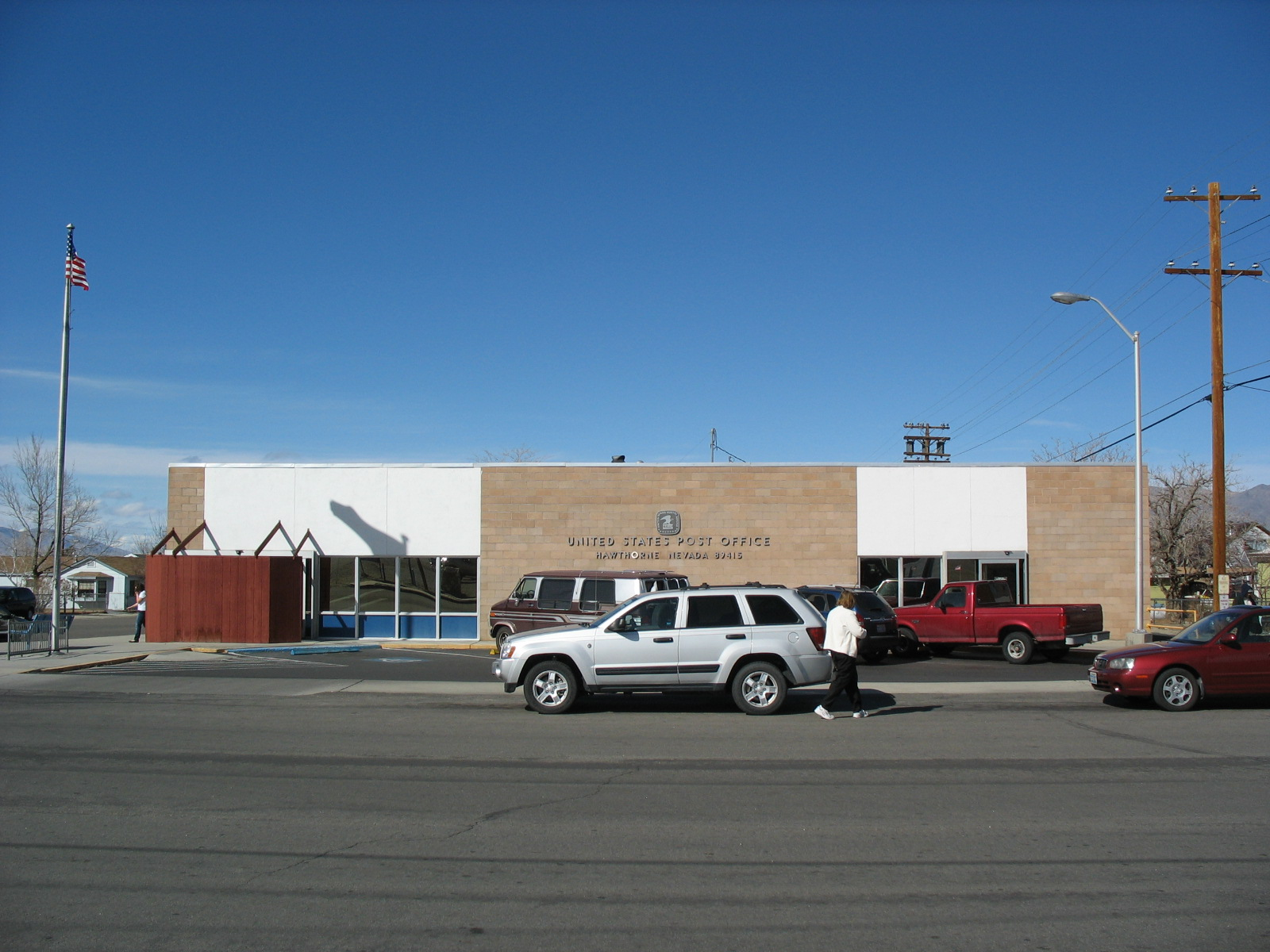
Hawthorne Post Office
