= Nike =

Nike often refers to:

- Nike, Inc., a major American producer of athletic shoes, apparel, and sports equipment
- Nike (mythology), a Greek goddess who personifies victory

Nike may also refer to:

== People ==
- Nike (name), a surname and feminine given name
- Nike, daughter of Shahrbaraz

== Arts, entertainment, and media ==
- Nike Award, a Polish language literature prize
- The Winged Victory of Samothrace, also known as the Niké of Samothrace, an ancient statue of the goddess Nike
- Nike of Callimachus, an ancient statue of the goddess Nike
- Nike of Paionios, a statue of Nike from Olympia, Greece
- Nike of Paros, a sculpture from Paros
- Nike of Megara, statue from Megara
- Nike of Epidaurus, a temple akroterion
- Nike (Hadrian's Library), found in Hadrian's Library
- Nike of Marathon, a modern bronze statue of the goddess
- Nike Fixing her Sandal, a marble relief from the Acropolis of Athens
- Nike Assists the Wounded Warrior, modern sculpture in Germany
- Nike Instructs the Boy in Heroic History, modern sculpture in Germany
- Nike (Kougioumtzis), modern abstract sculpture
- Nike Crowns the Hero, modern sculpture in Germany
- "Nike", a song by Aṣa from the album V (2022)
- "Nikes" (Frank Ocean song), 2016
- "Nikes" (Nimstarr song), 2020

== Military ==
- Project Nike, a US Army missile project
  - MIM-3 Nike Ajax, a solid fuel–propelled surface-to-air missile
  - Nike Hercules, a solid fuel–propelled surface-to-air missile
  - Nike (rocket stage)
  - Various US sounding rockets named after the upper stage used, including:
    - Nike-Apache
    - Nike-Asp
    - Nike-Cajun
    - Nike-Hawk
    - Nike-Hydac
    - Nike-Iroquois
    - Nike-Nike

== Other uses ==
- Nike (horse), an 18th-century British Thoroughbred racehorse
- Nike (Thrace), a town of ancient Thrace
- 307 Nike, a large asteroid in the main belt
- Niké (bookmaker), based in Slovakia

== See also ==
- Niki (disambiguation)
- Nika (disambiguation)
