= Nika (given name) =

- Gender: female or male

Origin
- Origin: Greek, Persian, Pashto, Nigerian
- Meaning: "victory" from nikē (νίκη), "Very Good" from Nik, "grandfather"

Other names
- Related names: Nike, Niki, Niko, Niku, Nikita, Nicholas, Nikola, Nikoloz, Nica

Nika is a female or male given name having multiple origins in different languages and countries. In Slavic countries the name comes from the Ancient Greek goddess of victory "Nike" (some personalities coming from Slavic countries are listed below). Nika is a female name in Persian, language meaning "very good" and "pure crystal water", it derives from "Nik" meaning "Good", "True" and "Chosen". Nika is also the name of a river in north of Iran. Zoroastrianism, the ancient Iranian religion believes in the motto "Pendar Nik" (Good Thoughts), "Goftar Nik" (Good Words), and "Kerdar Nik" (Good Deeds). In the Pashto language, Nika is a male given name meaning "grandfather". In Saraiki language Nika means "little" and used to be a popular nickname for the youngest boy in the family.

In Slovenia and Croatia, Nika is used as a feminine form of Nikola or Nikolaj. In the Russian language, Nika may be a diminutive of the male given names like Agafonik, Andronik, Dominik, Nikita, Nikodim, Nikifor or of the female given name Agafonika, as well as a form of female name Veronika. In Igbo culture, Nika, shortened version of female Ginika or Ginikanwa. Nika is a very popular man's name in Georgia.

== People ==
=== Arts and entertainment ===
- Nika Futterman (born 1969), aka Nika Frost, American voice actress
- Nikoloz Nika Kocharov (born 1980), Georgian singer-songwriter, composer, musician and actor
- Danika Nika McGuigan (1986–2019), Irish actress
- Nikoloz Rachveli (born 1979), Georgian conductor, composer and cultural manager
- Nika Turbina (1974–2002), Russian poet
- Nika Turković (born 1995), Croatian singer and songwriter

=== Politics ===
- Nikoloz Nika Gilauri (born 1975), Georgian politician, Prime Minister of Georgia from 2009 to 2012
- Nika Gvaramia (born 1976), Georgian lawyer and politician
- Nikalor Nika Melia (born 1979), Georgian politician
- Nika Petrović (born 1987), formerly known as Nika Orelj, Serbian politician
- Nikoloz Nika Rurua (1968–2018), Georgian politician

=== Sports ===
- Nika Abuladze (born 1995), Georgian rugby union player
- Nika Babnik (born 1998), Slovenian footballer
- Nika Barič (born 1992), Slovenian basketball player
- Nika Bobnar (born 2003), Slovenian cyclist
- Nika Chkhapeliya (born 1994), Russian footballer
- Nika Daalderop (born 1998), Dutch professional volleyball player
- Nika Dzalamidze (born 1992), Georgian footballer
- Nika Egadze (born 2002), Georgian figure skater
- Nika Fleiss (born 1984), Croatian former alpine skier
- Nika Kiladze (born 1988), Georgian former footballer
- Nikoloz Nika Kvekveskiri (born 1992), Georgian footballer
- Nika Metreveli (born 1991), Georgian basketball player
- Nika Mühl (born 2001), Croatian basketball player in the Women's National Basketball Association
- Nika Oborskaja (born 2009), Estonian rhythmic gymnast
- Nika Osipova (born 2001), Russian-born Dutch pair skater
- Nika Ožegović (born 1985), Croatian former tennis player
- Nika Piliyev (born 1991), Russian footballer
- Nika Prevc (born 2005), Slovenian ski jumper
- Nika Vodan (born 2000), Slovenian ski jumper

=== Other ===
- Nika Shakarami, Iranian teenager killed in 2022 after protests in Tehran

== Fictional characters ==
- Nika Volek, a character from the Fox television series Prison Break
- Sun God Nika, from the manga series One Piece
- Nika Aoi, from the manga series Beyblade Burst
- Nika aka Flatline, from DC Comics

== See also ==
- Nika (disambiguation)
- Nika (surname)
- Nica (name)
- Nia (given name)
- Nike (name)
- Nina (name)
- Niña (name)
