= Jenny Lind Tower =

Stone tower in Massachusetts, US

Coordinates: 42°2′4.27″N 70°3′18.72″W

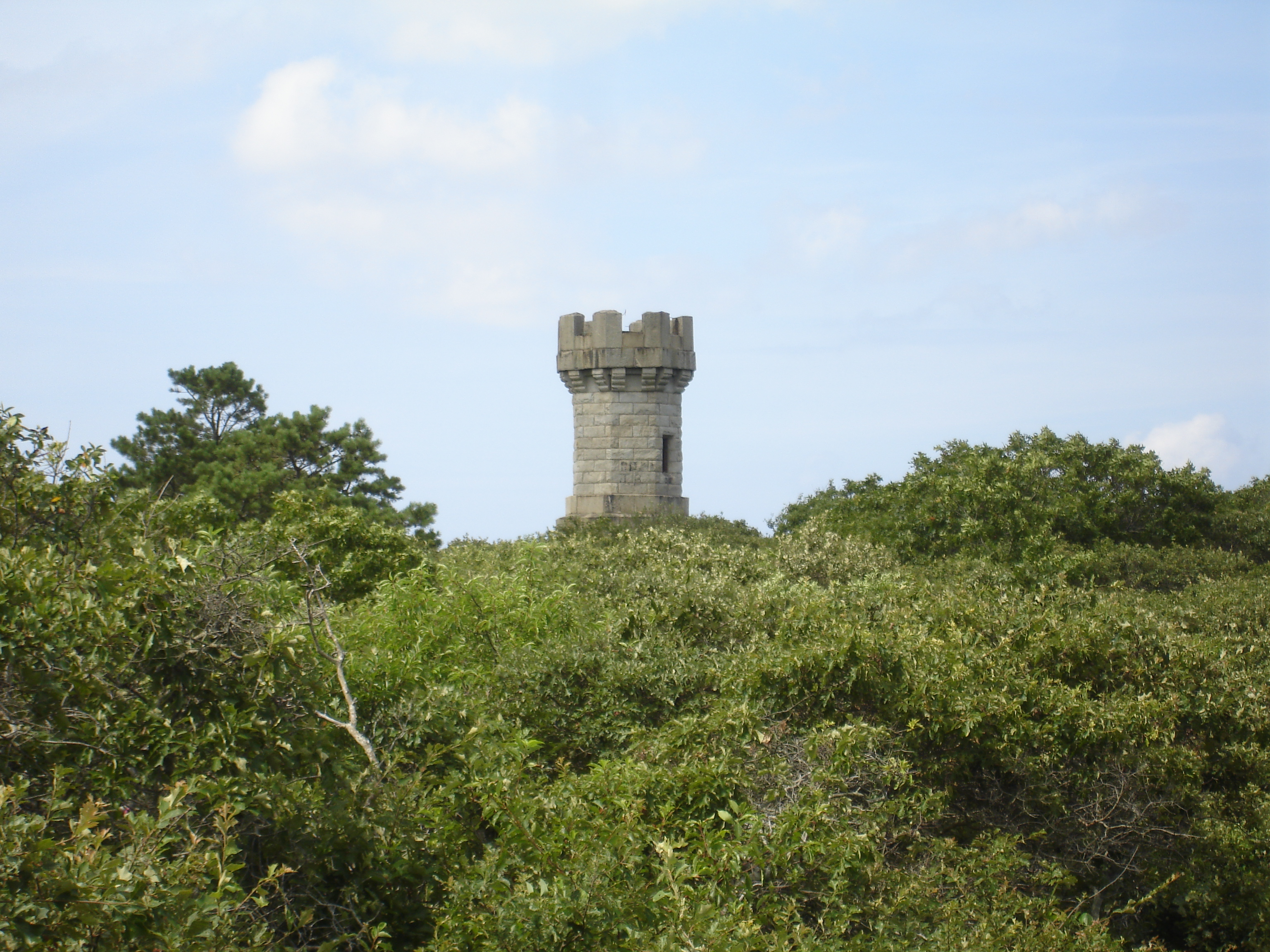
The Jenny Lind Tower as viewed from nearby North Truro Air Force Station

The Jenny Lind Tower is a stone tower located in North Truro, Massachusetts. It is named after the 19th-century opera singer Jenny Lind, who is rumored to have climbed the tower when it was located in Boston to prevent a riot among people who were unable to attend her concert. It is located roughly between the Highland Light lighthouse and North Truro Air Force Station. It is seventy feet tall.

== History ==
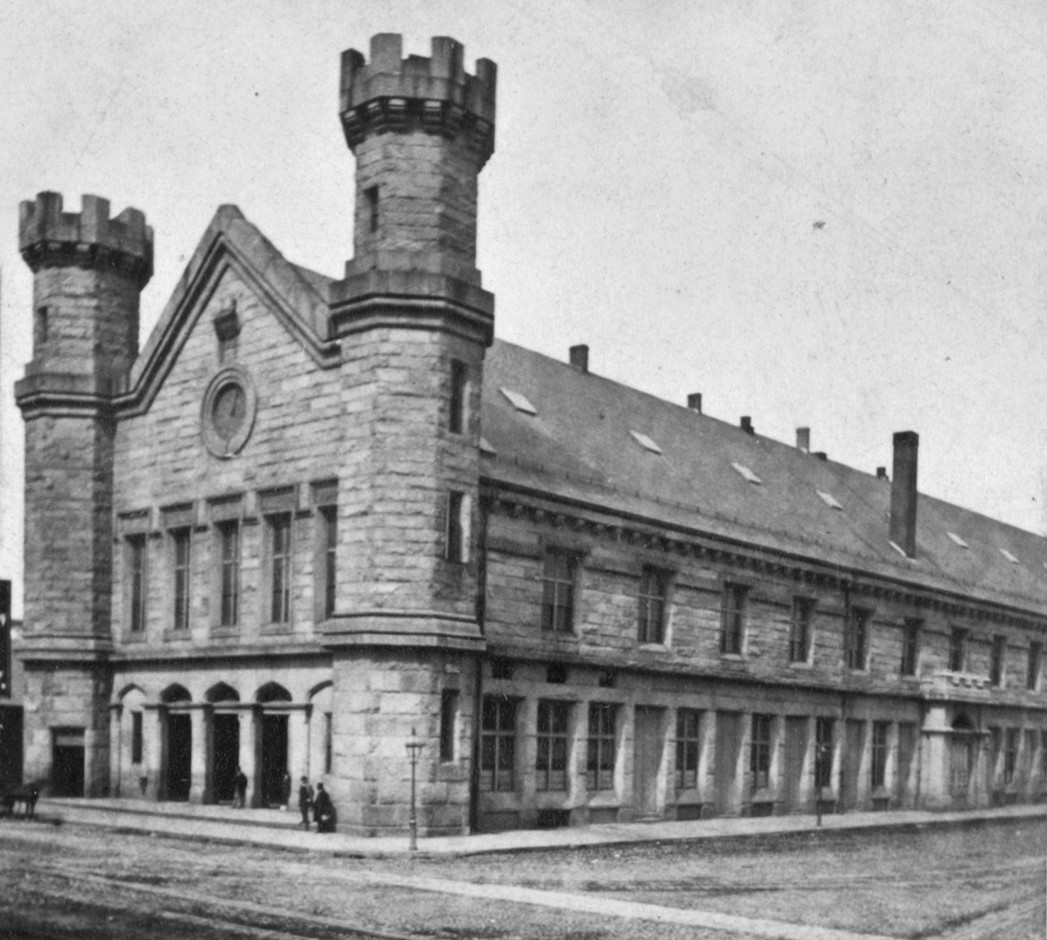
The Fitchburg Railroad station in Boston with the two towers

The tower, resembling a castle's battlement, was once part of the original circa 1845 Fitchburg Railroad depot in Boston; later (1900-1927) owned by the Boston and Maine Railroad which took over the Fitchburg in 1900. In 1850, the opera singer Jenny Lind sang in the auditorium above the station. The concert was oversold and many people were unable to get in. Soon after, she had to cut her performance short after fans began to crash the gates. P. T. Barnum was the publicist for Lind and it is possible that he created the legend behind the name.

In 1927, the station was being torn down. The lawyer Henry M. Aldrich, connected with the railroad, had the tower dismantled and transported to land in North Truro, Massachusetts of which he bought one hundred acres from a local named Mort Small. Erection of the tower took more than two months and involved the labor of five men. He also erected five cottages on the land, but left no reasoning for the erection of the tower.

The Cape Cod National Seashore obtained the deed for the tower in 1961; it was donated by Aldrich's daughter-in-law. There are no roads to the tower, although it is fairly close to a road that goes to a Federal Aviation Administration radar facility on land that is part of the old North Truro Air Force Station.

== Legend behind the name ==
A common myth surrounding the naming of the tower is that on the night of her performance, Jenny Lind climbed the tower and sang to the public. While this has not been proven false, newspaper reports of the time do not mention any sort of performance by her to the public below. It is also rumored that Henry Aldrich was an admirer of her, hence the reason that he moved the tower to his land despite not being born for another 17 years. In A Pilgrim Returns to Cape Cod (1946), the historian Edward Rowe Snow made the myth more attractive by stating, "There are those who like to believe that because an Aldrich family member was captivated by Jenny's voice, this caused them to decide to move the tower to their land in Truro, Massachusetts." He went on to undermine the myth by stating that Aldrich's son later told him that Lind's performance did not motivate his father to move the tower to the Cape. It is because of this myth that the legend of the tower lives on in local lore.

Local stories passed down for 300 years say that the ghost of Goody Hallett - known as "the Witch of Wellfleet", "the Sea Witch of Eastham", and "the Red Heeled Witch", and was the lover of Samuel Bellamy, captain of the pirate ship Whydah Gally - haunts the woods of Truro and Wellfleet in central Cape Cod. Her banshee screams can be heard at sunset from the cliffs of Wellfleet as she curses the passing ships to cause them to wreck there as her lover Sam Bellamy did in 1717. Legends say that when Goody Hallett begins her haunting, the ghost of Jenny Lind once again ascends the tower to sing, and the beauty of her nightingale song repels Goody and frightens her away.
