= Nika (surname) =

Nika is a surname. Notable people with this name include the following:

- Ansi Nika (born 1990), Albanian footballer
- Çiprian Nika (1900–1948), Albanian Catholic priest, Franciscan, teacher, and publicist
- Iltjan Nika (born 1995), Albanian road cyclist
- Katerina Nika (born 1962), Greece chess player
- Lelo Nika (born 1969), Serbian and Romanian Romani accordionist
- Marily Nika, Greek computational scientist and product manager
- Palokë Nika (1892–1961), Albanian footballer, sports events organizer, referee and sports journalist
- Pavlina Nika (1931–2011) Albanian singer

== See also ==
- Nika (disambiguation)
- Nika (given name)
