= Nica =

Nica or NICA may refer to:

- Nīca, a village in Latvia
- Niça, the native Occitan name of Nice, a city in France
- "Nica", a jazz tune composed by Sonny Clark
- Nica is an adjective which may refer to:
- Nica (name)
  - Nicaragua
  - Nicaraguan people
- Nica Airlines, an alternate name for Nicaragüense de Aviación, a Nicaraguan airline
- National Institute of Circus Arts, an Australian circus school
- National Intelligence Coordinating Agency, a government agency in the Philippines
- Netherlands Indies Civil Administration, the World War II-era Dutch colonial administration in Indonesia
- Nicotine Anonymous (NicA), a stop-smoking program
- Northern Ireland Court of Appeal, part of the Courts of Northern Ireland
- Nuclotron-based Ion Collider fAcility, a proton and heavy ion collider under construction at JINR in Dubna, Russia
