= Nikka =

Nikka may refer to:

== Organizations ==
- Nikka Whisky Distilling, a Japanese whisky bottling company

== People ==
- Nikka Costa (born 1972), American singer
- Nikka Edvardine Katajainen, a fictional character from Strike Witches
- Nikka Graff Lanzarone (born 1984), actress and dancer
- Nikka Valencia, Filipino film, television and theater actress
- Nikka Vonen (1836–1933), Norwegian educator, folklorist and author

== Places ==
- Nikka Yuko Japanese Garden, a garden near Henderson Lake

== Other ==
- Nikka, a fashion style of Fjällräven
- Nikka zubon, Japanese knickerbockers-style worker's pants

== See also ==
- Nika (disambiguation)
- Nikka Zaildar, a 2016 Indian Pujabi-language romantic comedy film by Simerjit Singh
  - Nikka Zaildar 2, its 2017 sequel
  - Nikka Zaildar 3, 2019 sequel to the 2017 film
