= Nica (name) =

Nica or Niča is a given and surname.

== People with the given name ==
- Nica Noelle (born 1976), American entrepreneur

== People with the surname ==
- Constantin Nica (born 1993), Romanian professional footballer
- Dan Nica (born 1960), Romanian politician
- Grigore Nica (1936–2009) was a Romanian composer
- Stavri Nica (born 1954), Albanian football coach

== People with the nickname ==
- Ion Creangă (1837-1889), Romanian writer
- Nica Burns (real name Lounica; born 1954), British theatre producer
- Pannonica de Koenigswarter (1913-1988), British-born Hungarian jazz patron

== Fictional characters with the name ==
- Nica Pierce (born 1988), of the Child's Play franchise

== See also ==
- Nica (disambiguation)
- Nika (given name)
- Niša Saveljić
- Cola Nicea
