= Nike (name) =

Nike (/ˈnaɪkɪ/ is a family name and feminine given name found in various cultures, deriving from Greek νίκη (nikē), "victory".

It is sometimes traceable to Nike, the Greek goddess of victory, which is also present in the more frequently-occurring names Nicholas and Nicole.

In the case of people of Nigerian heritage, Nike is an element of Yoruba names signifying "cherished".

An alternative spelling is Nyke.

== People with the given name Nike ==
- Nike Ardilla (1975-1995), Indonesian singer
- Nike Bent (born 1981), Swedish Olympic alpine skier
- Nike Borzov, Russian singer
- Nike Davies-Okundaye (born 1951), Nigerian designer
- Nike Doggart, conservationist
- Nike Kornecki (born 1982), Israeli Olympic sailor
- Nike Oshinowo, Nigerian businesswoman
- Nike Sibande (born 1999), American basketball player
- Nike Sun, mathematician
- Nike Wagner (born 1945), German arts festival director
- Nyke Slawik (born 1994), German politician

=== Fictional characters ===
- Nike in The Underland Chronicles children's books by Suzanne Collins

== People with the surname Nike ==
- John Nike, British hotel entrepreneur

== See also ==
- Nike (disambiguation)
- Nika (given name)
