= Operation Have Horn =

Operation Have Horn was a project in 1969 by the United States Air Force that involved the launching of Nike Hydac sounding rockets. It occurred at North Truro Air Force Station, located in North Truro, Massachusetts. Upon completion of the operation in 1970, the used devices were returned to the White Sands Missile Range, in New Mexico. Have Horn was support and carried out by the Missile and Drone Division of the Air Force Missile Development Center, Holloman Air Force Base, New Mexico.

Due to the involvement of the Air Force Cambridge Research Laboratories in the operation, it was deemed easier to launch the rockets in North Truro under the code name Have Horn. Thus, a sounding rocket launcher and support equipment were installed at the station, and a series of Nike-Hydac rockets were fired from December 1969 to early 1970. The goal of the operation was to test sensors for the Massachusetts Institute of Technology. Following the end of the operation, the equipment was airlifted back to Holloman.

== See also ==
- Nike Ajax
