= Project Nike =

Missile program of the United States Army

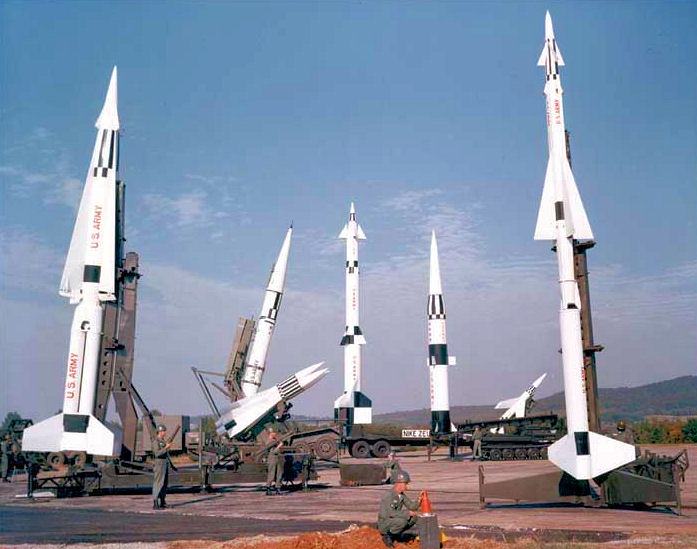
Nike missile family and other missiles on display at Redstone Arsenal, Alabama. From left, Nike Hercules, MIM-23 Hawk (front), MGM-29 Sergeant (back), LIM-49 Spartan, MGM-31 Pershing, MGM-18 Lacrosse, MIM-3 Nike Ajax, ENTAC (foreground)

Project Nike was a U.S. Army project proposed in May 1945 by Bell Laboratories to develop a line-of-sight anti-aircraft missile system. By 1953 the project delivered the United States' first operational anti-aircraft missile system, the Nike Ajax. Many technologies and rocket systems used for developing the Nike Ajax were re-used in other projects, many given the "Nike" name (after Nike, the goddess of victory from Greek mythology). The missile's first-stage solid rocket booster became the basis for many types of rockets, including the Nike Hercules and Nike Smoke.

== History ==
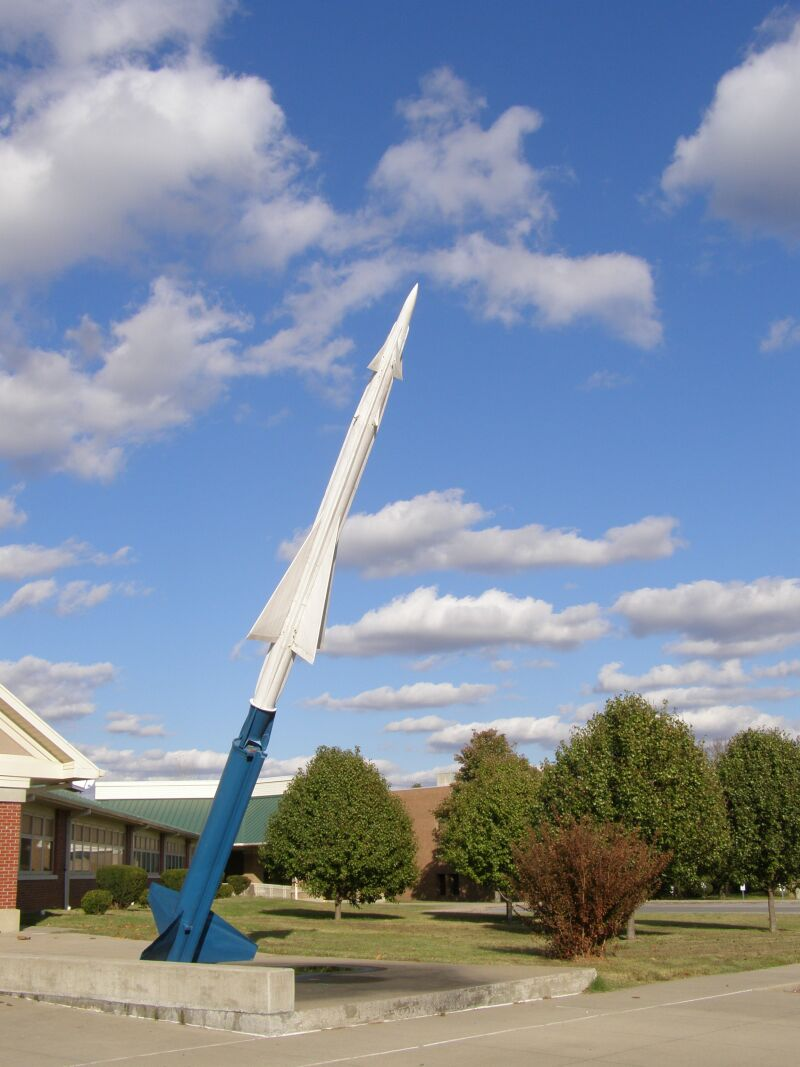
Nike Ajax located in Marion, Kentucky

Project Nike began in 1944 when the War Department demanded a new air defense system to fight jet aircraft that flew too high and fast for anti-aircraft guns. Two proposals were accepted: Bell Laboratories' Project Nike and General Electric's Project Thumper, a much longer-ranged, collision-course system that eventually delivered the BOMARC missile.

Bell Labs' proposal would have to deal with bombers flying at 500 mph (800 km/h) or more, at altitudes of up to 60,000 ft (20,000 m). At these speeds, even a supersonic rocket is no longer fast enough to be simply aimed at the target. The missile must "lead" the target to hit before it runs out of fuel. By this point, the U.S. had considerable experience with lead-calculating analog computers, starting with the British Kerrison Predictor and a series of increasingly capable U.S. designs.

But the missile and target cannot be tracked by a single radar, increasing the complexity of the system. For Nike, three radars were used. The acquisition radar (such as the AN/GSS-1 Electronic Search Central with the AN/TPS-1D radar) searched for a target to be handed over to the Target Tracking Radar (TTR). The Missile Tracking Radar (MTR) tracked the missile by way of a transponder, as the missile's radar signature alone was not sufficient. The MTR also commanded the missile by way of pulse-position modulation: the pulses were received, decoded and then amplified back for the MTR to track. Once the tracking radars were locked, the system was able to work automatically following launch, barring any unexpected occurrences. The computer compared the two radars' directions, along with information on the speeds and distances, to calculate the intercept point and steer the missile. The entire system was provided by the Bell System's electronics firm, Western Electric.

"The Nike Hercules Story" (1960) de-classified official Nike Hercules and Ajax information film reel.

The Douglas-built missile was a two-stage missile using a solid fuel booster stage and a liquid fueled (IRFNA/UDMH) second stage. The missile could reach a speed of 1,000 mph (1,600 km/h) and an altitude of 70,000 ft (21 km) and had a range of 25 miles (40 km). The missile contained an unusual three-part payload, with explosive fragmentation charges at three points down the length of the missile to help ensure a lethal hit. The missile's limited range was seen by critics as a serious flaw, because it often meant that the missile had to be sited very close to the area it was protecting.Consolidated Western Steel produced the launcher loaders. Fruehauf Trailer Corporation produced the trailers.

Per the Key West Agreement, all longer-range systems were assigned to the Air Force during 1948. They merged their own long-range research with Project Thumper, while the Army continued to develop Nike. In 1950, the Army formed the Army Anti-Aircraft Command to operate batteries of anti-aircraft guns and missiles, which was renamed the Army Air Defense Command (ARADCOM).

=== Nike Ajax ===
A Nike Ajax missile

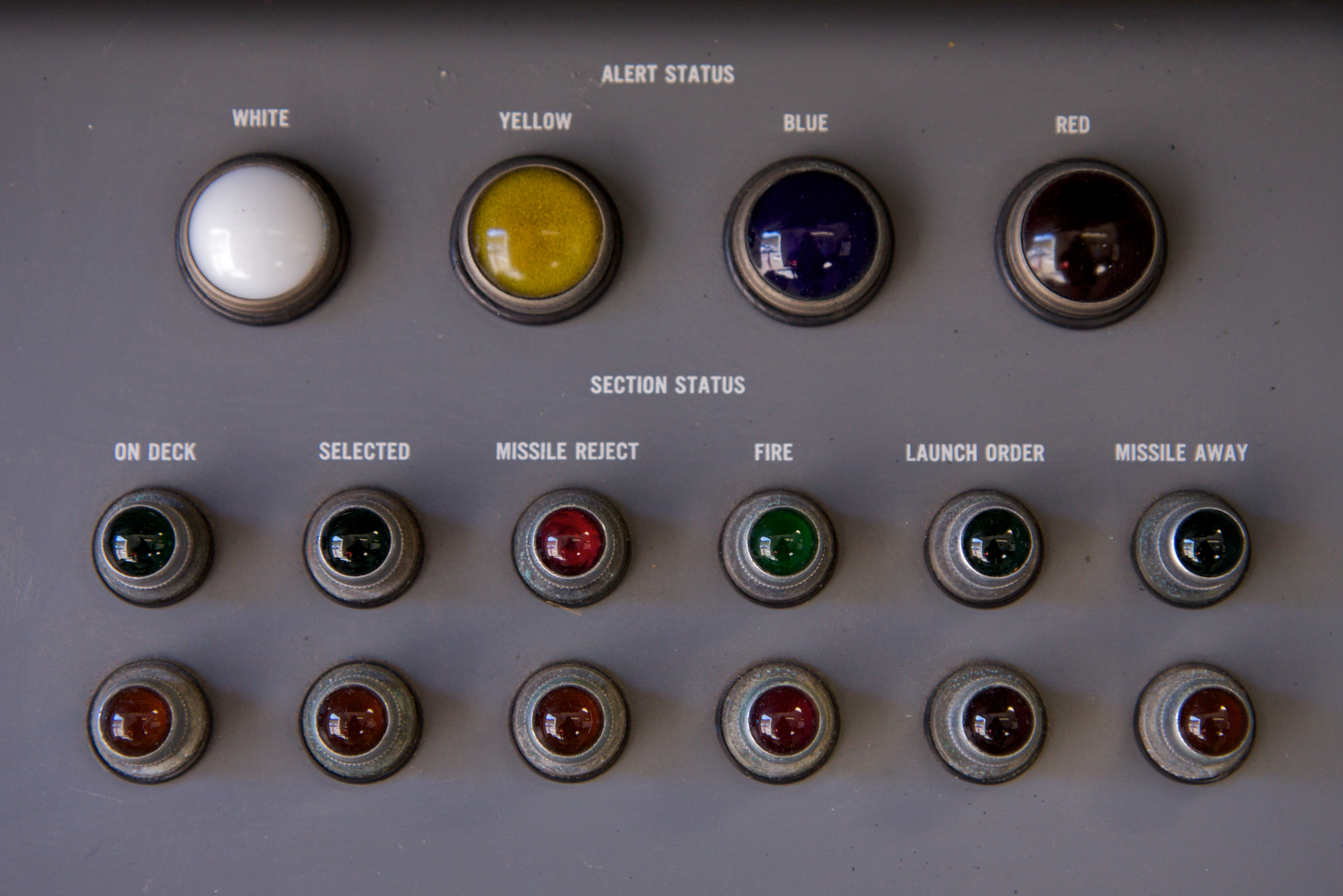
Nike site SF-88L missile control

The first successful Nike test was during November 1951, intercepting a drone B-17 Flying Fortress. The first type, Nike Ajax (MIM-3), was deployed starting in 1953. The Army initially ordered 1,000 missiles and 60 sets of equipment. They were placed to protect strategic and tactical sites within the US. As a last-line of defense from air attack, they were positioned to protect cities as well as military installations. The missile was deployed first at Fort Meade during December 1953. A further 240 launch sites were built up to 1962. They replaced 896 radar-guided anti-aircraft guns, operated by the National Guard or Army to protect certain key sites. This left a handful of 75 mm Skysweeper emplacements as the only anti-aircraft artillery remaining in use by the US. By 1957 the Regular Army AAA units had been replaced by missile battalions. During 1958 the Army National Guard began to replace their guns and adopt the Ajax system.

Each launch site had three parts, separated by at least 1,000 yards (914 m). One part (designated C) of about six acres (24,000 m^{2}) contained the Integrated Fire Control (IFC) radar systems to detect incoming targets (acquisition and target tracking) and direct the missiles (missile tracking), along with the computer systems to plot and direct the intercept. The second part (designated L), around forty acres (160,000 m^{2}), held one to three underground missile magazines each serving a group of four launch assemblies and included a safety zone. The site had a crew of 109 officers and men who ran the site continuously. One launcher would be on 15 minutes alert, two on 30 minutes and one on two hour alert. The third part was the administrative area (designated A), which was usually co-located with the IFC and contained the battery headquarters, barracks, mess, recreation hall, and motor pool. The actual configuration of the Nike sites differed depending on geography. Whenever possible the sites were placed on existing military bases or National Guard armories; otherwise land had to be purchased.

The Nike batteries were organized in Defense Areas and placed around population centers and strategic locations such as long-range bomber bases, nuclear plants, and (later) ICBM sites. The Nike sites in a Defense Area formed a circle around these cities and bases. There was no fixed number of Nike batteries in a Defense Area, and the actual number of batteries varied from a low of two in the Barksdale Air Force Base Defense Area to a high of 22 in the Chicago Defense Area. In the Continental United States the sites were numbered from 01 to 99 starting at the north and increasing clockwise. The numbers had no relation to actual compass headings, but generally Nike sites numbered 01 to 25 were to the northeast and east, those numbered 26 to 50 were to the southeast and south, those numbered 51 to 75 were to the southwest and west, and those numbered 76 to 99 were to the northwest and north. The Defense Areas in the Continental United States were identified by a one- or two-letter code which were related to the city name. Thus those Nike sites starting with C were in the Chicago Defense Area, those starting with HM were in the Homestead/Miami Defense Area, those starting with NY were in the New York Defense Area, and so forth. As an example Nike Site SF-88L refers to the launcher area (L) of the battery located in the northwestern part (88) of the San Francisco Defense Area (SF).

Eventually, the regular Army units were replaced by the National Guard as a cost-saving measure, since the Guard units could return to their homes when off duty. A Nike Ajax missile accidentally exploded at a battery in Leonardo, New Jersey, on 22 May 1958, killing six soldiers and four civilians. A memorial can be found at Fort Hancock in the Sandy Hook Unit of Gateway National Recreation Area.

=== Nike Hercules ===
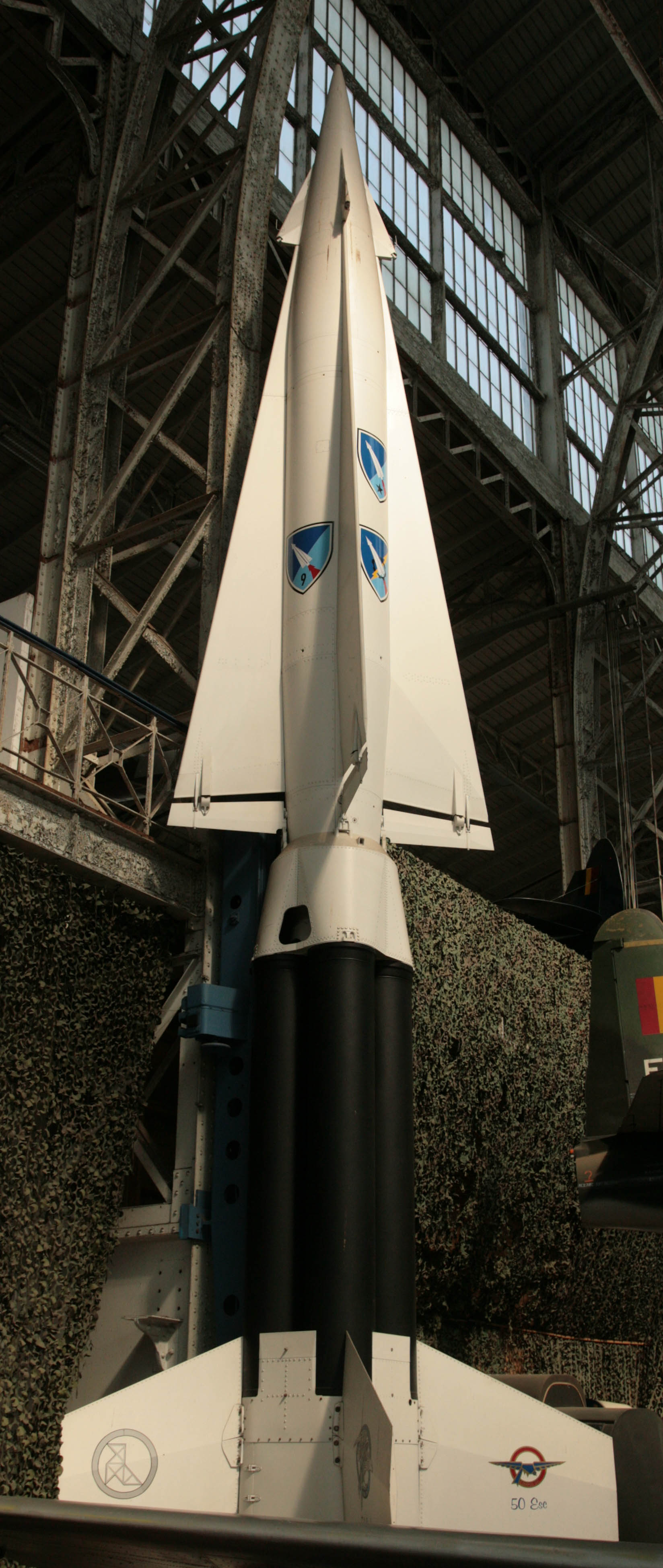
A Nike Hercules missile

Even as Nike Ajax was being tested, work started on Nike-B, later renamed Nike Hercules (MIM-14). It improved speed, range and accuracy, and could intercept ballistic missiles. The Hercules had a range of about 100 miles (160 km), a top speed in excess of 3,000 mph (4,800 km/h) and a maximum altitude of around 150,000 ft (about 46 km) (30 km). It had solid fuel boost and sustainer engines, with the boost phase consisting of four Nike Ajax boosters strapped together. In the 1970s some (foreign) users replaced the vacuum tube guidance circuits in the missile with more reliable solid-state components, but electron tube circuits were still used well into the 1980s. The electron tube's resistance to electromagnetic pulse (EMP) effects over earlier non-EMP-hardened solid-state circuits played a major part in the retention of 'obsolete' technology until hardened solid-state circuits were developed.

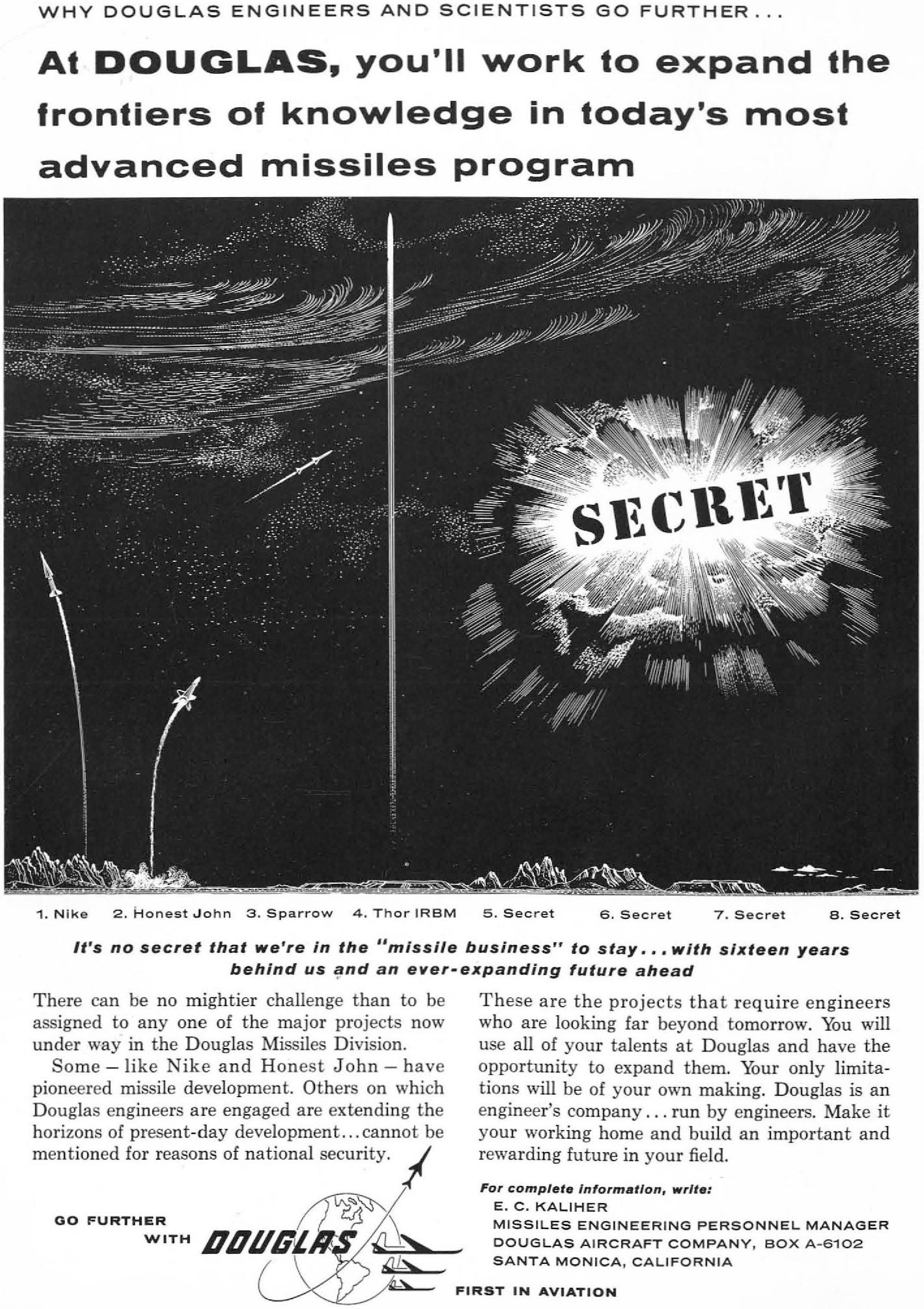
"It's no secret we're in the 'missile business' to stay..." Douglas Aircraft Company ad in the California Institute of Technology 1958 yearbook

The missile also had an optional nuclear warhead to improve the ability to defend against mass formations. The W-31 warhead had four variants offering 2, 10, 20 and 30 kiloton yields. The 20 kt version was used in the Hercules system. At sites in the United States, the missile almost exclusively carried a nuclear warhead. Sites in foreign nations typically had a mix of high-explosive and nuclear warheads. The fire-control system of the Nike system was also improved in the Hercules and included a surface-to-surface mode which was successfully tested in Alaska. Arming the missile, with concurrent choosing of the deployment mode, was accomplished by changing a single plug on the warhead from the "Safe Plug" to "Surface to Air" or "Surface to Surface" and a range setting in the TRR.

The Nike Hercules was deployed starting in June 1958. First deployed to Chicago, 393 Hercules ground systems were manufactured. By 1960 ARADCOM had 88 Hercules batteries and 174 Ajax batteries, defending 23 zones across 30 states. Peak deployment was in 1963 with 134 Hercules batteries not including the US Army Hercules batteries deployed in Germany, Greece, Greenland, Italy, Korea, Okinawa, Taiwan, and Turkey.

In 1961, Strategic Air Command (SAC) and the U.S. Army began a joint training mission with benefits for both parties. SAC needed fresh (simulated) targets which the cities ringed by Nike/Hercules sites provided, and the Army needed live targets to acquire and track with their radar. SAC had many Radar Bomb Scoring (RBS) sites across the country which had very similar acquisition and tracking radar, plus similar computerized plotting boards which were used to record the bomber tracks and bomb release points. Airmen from these sites were temporarily assigned to Nike sites across the country to train the Nike crews in RBS procedures. The distances from the simulated bomb landing point and the "target" were recorded on paper, measured, encoded, and transmitted to the aircrews. The results of these bomb runs were used to promote or demote air crews. These exercises also included electronic countermeasure training.

Many Nike Hercules batteries were under the control of Army National Guard troops, with a single active Army officer assigned to each battalion to account for the unit's nuclear warheads. The National Guard air defense units shared responsibility for defense of their assigned area with active Army units in the area, and reported to the active Army chain of command. This is the only publicly verified instance of Army National Guard units being equipped with operational nuclear weapons.

=== Nike Zeus ===
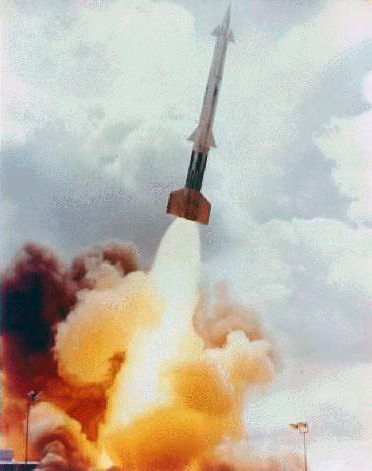
Launch of a Nike Zeus missile

Development continued, producing Improved Nike Hercules and then Nike Zeus A and B. The Zeus was aimed at intercontinental ballistic missiles (ICBMs).

Zeus, with a new 400,000 lbf (1.78 MN) thrust solid-fuel booster, was first test-launched during August 1959 and demonstrated a top speed of 8,000 mph (12,875 km/h). The Nike Zeus system utilized the ground-based Zeus Acquisition Radar (ZAR), a significant improvement over the Nike Hercules HIPAR guidance system. Shaped like a pyramid, the ZAR featured a Luneburg lens receiver aerial weighing about 1,000 tons. The first successful intercept of an ICBM by Zeus was in 1962, at Kwajalein in the Marshall Islands. Despite its technological advancements, the Department of Defense terminated Zeus development in 1963. The Zeus system, which cost an estimated $15 billion, still suffered from several technical flaws that were believed to be uneconomical to overcome.

Still, the Army continued to develop an anti-ICBM weapon system, referred to as "Nike-X", that was largely based on the technological advances of the Zeus system. Nike-X featured phased-array radars, computer advances, and a missile tolerant of skin temperatures three times those of the Zeus. In September 1967, the Department of Defense announced the deployment of the LIM-49A Spartan missile system, its major elements drawn from Nike-X development.

In March 1969 the Army started the anti-ballistic missile (ABM) Safeguard Program, which was designed to defend Minuteman ICBMs, based on the Nike-X system. It became operational in 1975 but was shut down after just three months.

=== Nike-X ===
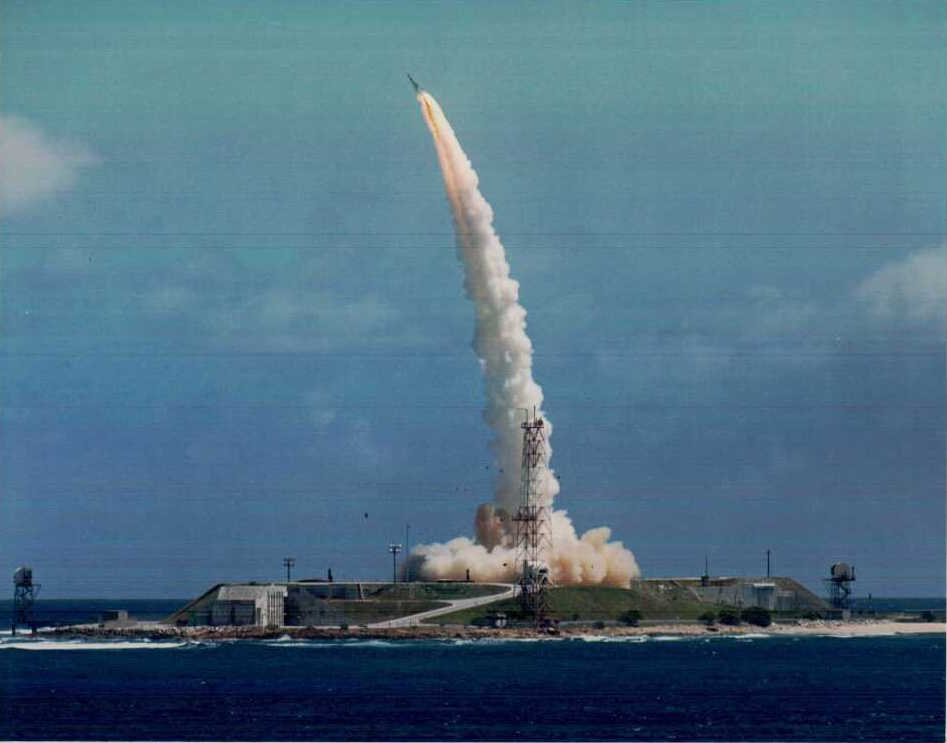
The Sprint missile was the main weapon in the Nike-X system, intercepting enemy ICBM warheads only seconds before they exploded.

Nike-X was a proposed US Army ABM system designed to protect major cities in the United States from attacks by the Soviet Union's ICBM fleet. The name referred to its experimental basis; it was intended to be replaced by a more appropriate name when the system was put into production. This never came to pass; the original Nike-X concept was replaced by a much more limited defense system known as the Sentinel program that used some of the same equipment.

Nike-X was a response to the failure of the earlier Zeus system. Zeus had been designed to face a few dozen Soviet ICBMs in the 1950s, and its design would mean it was largely useless by mid-1960s when it would be facing hundreds. It was calculated that a salvo of only four ICBMs would have a 90% chance of hitting the Zeus base, as their radars could only track a few warheads at the same time. Worse, the attacker could use radar reflectors or high-altitude nuclear explosions to obscure the warheads until they were too close to attack, making a single warhead attack highly likely to succeed.

Nike-X addressed these concerns by basing its defense on a very fast, short-range missile known as Sprint. Large numbers would be clustered near potential targets, allowing successful interception right up to the last few seconds of the warhead's re-entry. They would operate below the altitude where decoys or explosions had any effect. Nike-X also used a new radar system that could track hundreds of objects at once, allowing salvoes of many Sprints. It would require dozens of missiles to overwhelm the system. Nike-X considered retaining the longer range Zeus missile and later developed an extended range version known as Zeus EX. It played a secondary role in the Nike-X system, intended primarily for use in areas outside the Sprint protected regions.

Nike-X required at least one interceptor missile to attack each incoming warhead. As the USSR's missile fleet grew, the cost of implementing Nike-X grew as well. Looking for lower-cost options, studies were carried out between 1965 and 1967 to examine a variety of scenarios where a limited number of interceptors might still be militarily useful. Among these, the I-67 concept suggested building a lightweight defense against very limited attacks. When the Chinese exploded their first H-bomb in 1967, I-67 was promoted as a defense against a Chinese attack, and this system became Sentinel in October. Nike-X development in its original form ended.

=== Production ===
The figures do not include approximately 1 billion dollars for research and development, paid to Western Electric. The figures below are in millions of dollars.

Company	Production cost	Producer profit	Douglas subcontract profit	Western Electric subcontract profit
Tier 3, subcontractors to Douglas Aircraft
Fruehauf Trailer Co.	49.3	4.5	3.7	3.3
Consolidated Western Steel	146.2	9.3	10.4	9.8
others	286.6	(Note: Undetermined profits included in costs)	23.2	16.3
Tier 2, subcontractors to Western Electric
Douglas Aircraft	103	8.3		5.9
others	428.8			42
Tier 1, contractor to the Army
Western Electric	359.3	35.2		
Totals
	1,373.2 (Note: Some profits included in production totals)	57.3	37.3	77.3

Total cost to Army: 1,545.1

=== Decommissioning ===
Soviet development of ICBMs decreased the value of the Nike (aircraft) air defense system. Beginning around 1965, the number of Nike batteries was reduced. Thule air defense was reduced during 1965 and SAC air base defense during 1966, reducing the number of batteries to 112. Budgetary cuts reduced that number to 87 in 1968 and 82 in 1969.

Some small-scale work to use Nike Zeus as an anti-satellite weapon was carried out from 1962 until the project was canceled in favor of the Thor based Program 437 system during 1966. In the end, neither development would enter service. However, the Nike Zeus system did demonstrate a hit-to-kill capability against ballistic missiles during the early 1960s.

Nike Hercules was included in SALT I discussions as an ABM. Following the Anti-Ballistic Missile Treaty signed during 1972, and further budget reduction, almost all Nike sites in the continental United States were deactivated by April 1974. Some units remained active until the later part of that decade in a coastal air defense role.

== Specifications ==
Missile	Nike Ajax	Nike Hercules	Nike Zeus A	Nike Zeus B (XLIM-49A)	Spartan (LIM-49A)
Length	34 ft 0 in (10.36 m) overall 21 ft 0 in (6.41 m)second stage	41 ft 1 in (12.53 m) overall 26 ft 10 in (8.18 m) second stage	44 ft 3 in (13.5 m)	48 ft 3 in (14.7 m)	55 ft 1 in (16.8 m)
Diameter	1 ft 0 in (0.30 m)	2 ft 7 in (0.80 m) booster 1 ft 9 in (0.53 m) second stage	3 ft 0 in (0.91 m)	3 ft 0 in (0.91 m)	3 ft 7 in (1.09 m)
Fin span	4 ft 0 in (1.22 m)	11 ft 6 in (3.50 m) booster 6 ft 2 in (1.88 m) second stage	9 ft 9 in (2.98 m)	8 ft 0 in (2.44 m)	9 ft 9 in (2.98 m)
Mass	2,460 lb (1,116 kg) at launch 1,153 lb (523 kg) second stage	10,690 lb (4,850 kg) at launch 5,523 lb (2,505 kg) second stage	10,980 lb (4,980 kg)	22,700 lb (10,300 kg)	28,900 lb (13,100 kg)
Maximum speed	Mach 2.25 (ca. 1485 mph true airspeed @ 50k ft; 2390 km/h)	Mach 3.65 (ca. 2094 mph true airspeed @ 65k ft; 3877 km/h)	Mach 4 > (ca. 2800+ mph; 4,900 km/h arbitrary)		
Range	25 mi (40 km)	87 mi (140 km)	200 mi (320 km)	250 mi (400 km)	460 mi (740 km)
Ceiling	69,900 ft (21,300 m)	149,900 ft (45,700 m)	?	170 mi (280 km)	350 mi (560 km)
First stage	Solid-fuel (59,000 lbf or 263 kN static thrust for 2.5 seconds)	Hercules M42 solid-fueled rocket cluster (4x M5E1 Nike boosters); 220,000 lbf (978 kN) total	Thiokol TX-135; 400,000 lbf (1,800 kN)	Thiokol TX-135; 450,000 lbf (2,000 kN)	Thiokol TX-500; 500,000 lbf (2,200 kN)
Second stage	Liquid-fuel (2,600 lbf or 11.6 kN static thrust for 21 seconds)	Thiokol M30 solid-fueled rocket 10,000 lbf (44.4 kN)	?	Thiokol TX-238	Thiokol TX-454
Third stage	None	None	None	Thiokol TX-239	Thiokol TX-239
Warhead conventional	3 warheads each surrounded with 2 layers of 1/4 in (6 mm) hardened steel cubes Nose: M2: 4.5 lb (2.0 kg) Composition B 12 lb (5.4 kg) total Mid-body: M3: 92 lb (42 kg) Comp. B, 176.8 lb (80.2 kg) total Aft: M4: 59 lb (27 kg) Comp B, 121.3 lb (55.0 kg) total	T-45 HE warhead weighed 1106 lb (500 kg) and contained 600 lb (272 kg) of HBX-6; M17 blast-fragmentation	Nuclear warhead only	Nuclear warhead only	Nuclear warhead only
Warhead nuclear	Conventional warhead only	W-31 nuclear 20 kt (M-22)	W-31 nuclear	W50 (400 kt) thermonuclear	W71 (5 Mt) thermonuclear

== Support vehicles ==
These trucks and trailers were used with the Nike system.

- Trucks

M254 truck, missile rocket motor, Nike Ajax
M255 truck, body section, Nike Ajax
M256 truck, inert, Nike Ajax
M257 truck, inert, Nike Ajax
M442 truck, guided missile, rocket motor, Nike Hercules
M451 truck, guided missile test set, Nike Hercules
M473 truck, guided missile body section, Nike Hercules
M489 truck, missile nose section, Nike Hercules

- G789 Trailers

M242 trailer, M33 fire control, radar dish van mount, 2-ton,
M243 trailer, M33 fire control, antenna hauler, 2-ton,
M244 trailer, M33 fire control, computer van, 2-ton,
M258 van, radar tracking central
M259 van, guided missile directors trailer
M260 low bed antenna mount
M261 flat bed, guided missile
M262 van, launch control station
M304 van, electronic shop, Nike Ajax
M359 van, electronic repair shop
M382 van, electronic repair shop
M383 van, electronic repair shop
M406 low bed antenna mount
M424 van, guided missile directors trailer
M428 van, guided missile tracking station
M429 dolly, for Nike trailers

M430 dolly, trailer, rear, for Nike trailers
M431 dolly, trailer, front, for Nike trailers
M432 dolly, trailer, rear, for Nike trailers
M529 trailer, low bed, 7-ton, missile, Nike
M564 trailer van, electronic shop, 9-ton,
M565 dolly, trailer, front,
M573 dolly, front, launch control station,
M582 van, shop
M583 van, shop
M584 dolly, trailer, front,
M589 dolly, trailer, front, electronic,
M595 dolly, trailer, front, antenna,
M657 trailer, van radar simulator test station,
M699 dolly trailer, rear,
M802 trailer, electric shop, radar course direct central, Nike Hercules

== Deployment ==
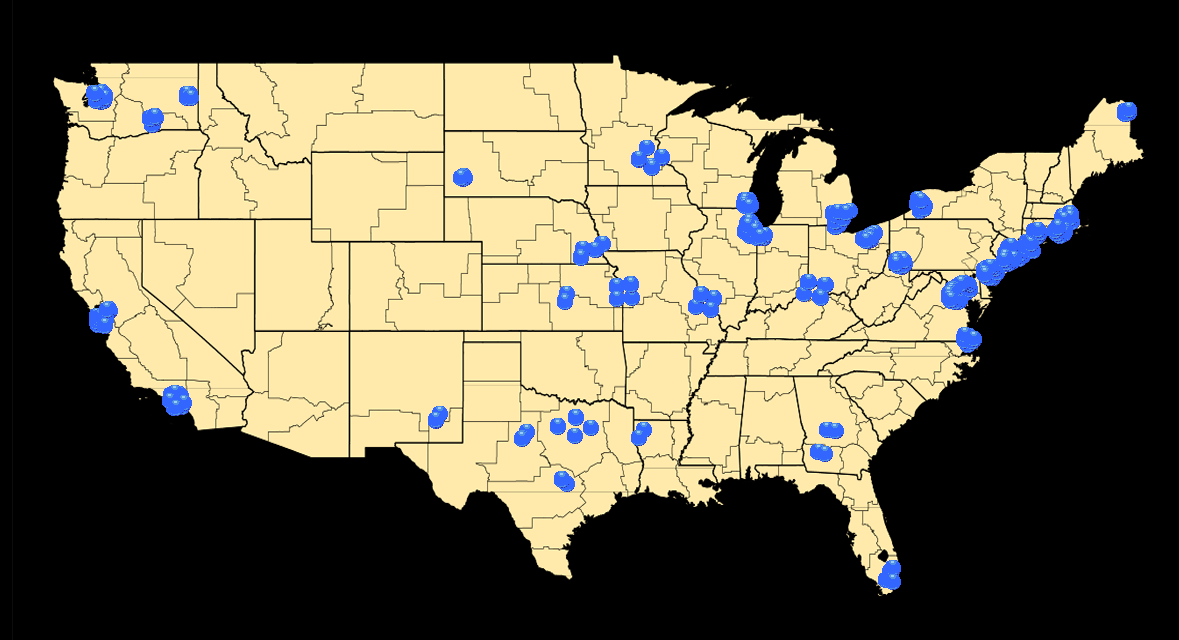
Locations of US Army Nike Missile Sites in the Contiguous United States

By 1958, the Army had deployed nearly 200 Nike Ajax batteries at 40 "Defense Areas" within the United States (including Alaska and Hawaii) in which Project Nike missiles were deployed. Within each Defense Area, a "Ring of Steel" was developed with a series of Nike Integrated Firing and Launch Sites constructed by the U.S. Army Corps of Engineers.

The deployment was designed to initially supplement and then replace gun batteries deployed around the nation's major urban areas and vital military installations. The defense areas consisted of major cities and selected SAC bases which were deemed vital to national defense. The original basing strategy projected a central missile assembly point from which missiles would be taken out to prepared above-ground launch racks ringing the defended area. However, the Army discarded this semi-mobile concept because the system needed to be ready for instantaneous action to fend off a "surprise attack." Instead, a fixed-site scheme was devised.

Due to geographical factors, the placement of Nike batteries differed at each location. Initially, the planners chose fixed sites well away from the defended area and the Corps of Engineers Real Estate Offices began seeking tracts of land in rural areas. However, Army planners determined that close-in perimeter sites would provide enhanced firepower. Staggering sites between outskirt and close-in locations to urban areas gave defenders a greater defense-in-depth capability.

Each Nike missile battery was divided into two basic parcels: the Battery Control Area and the Launch Area. The Battery Control Area contained the radar and computer equipment. Housing and administration buildings, including the mess hall, barracks, and recreation facilities, were sometimes located in a third parcel of land. More likely, however, the housing and administration buildings were located at either the Battery Control Area or the Launch Area, depending upon site configuration, obstructions, and the availability of land. The Launch Area provided for the maintenance, storage, testing, and firing of the Nike missiles. The selection of this area was primarily influenced by the relatively large amount of land required, its suitability to extensive underground construction, and the need to maintain a clear line-of-sight between the missiles in the Launch Area and the missile-tracking-radar in the Battery Control Area.

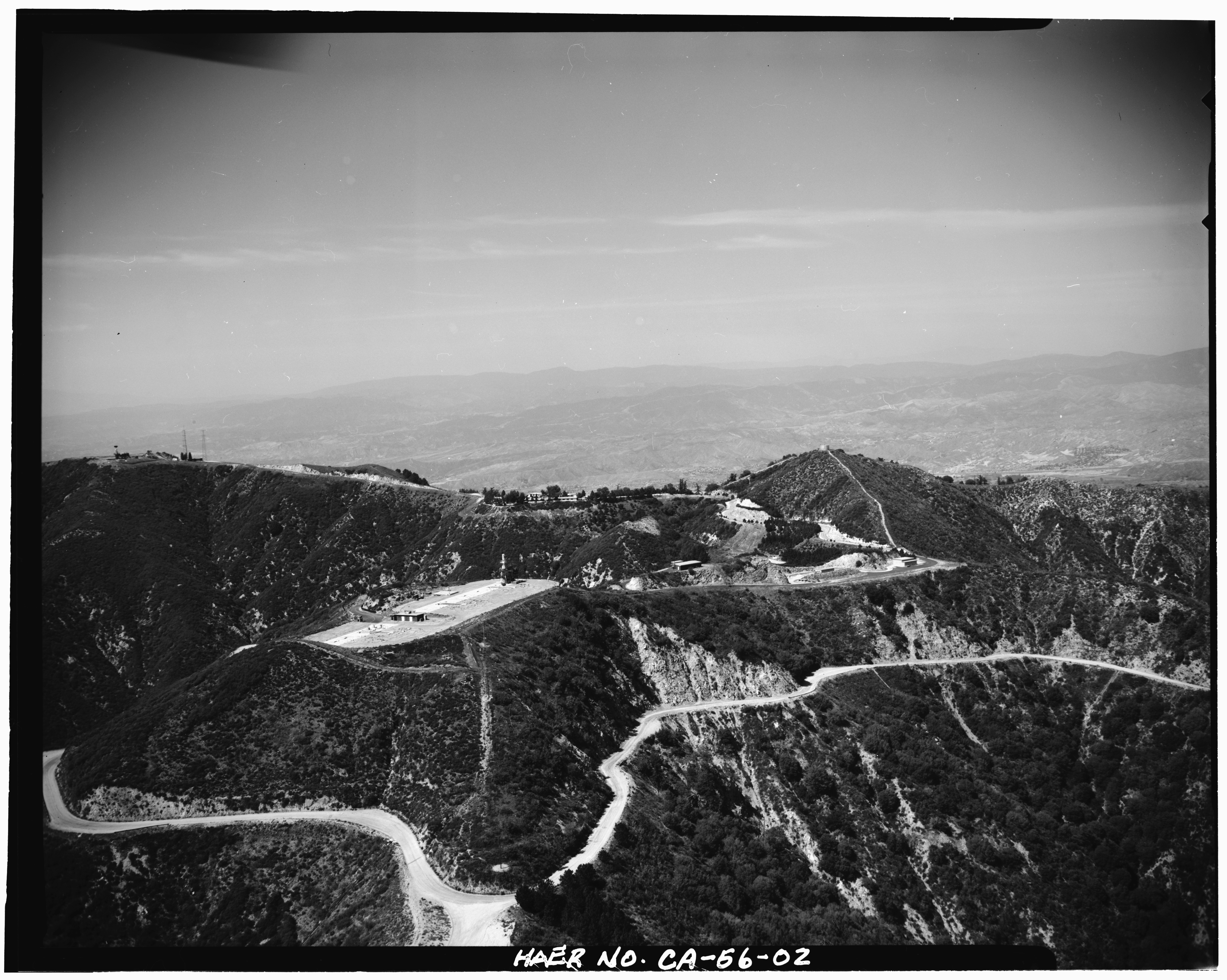
Aerial view of former Nike missile site near Los Angeles, showing radar site in upper left and launch site in foreground. By Everett Weinreb for HAER (April 1988).

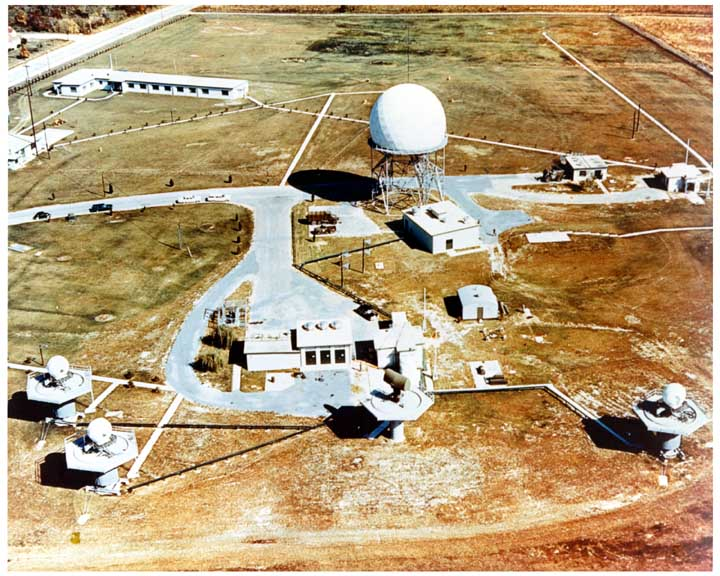
Integrated Fire Control Area for a Nike-Hercules site

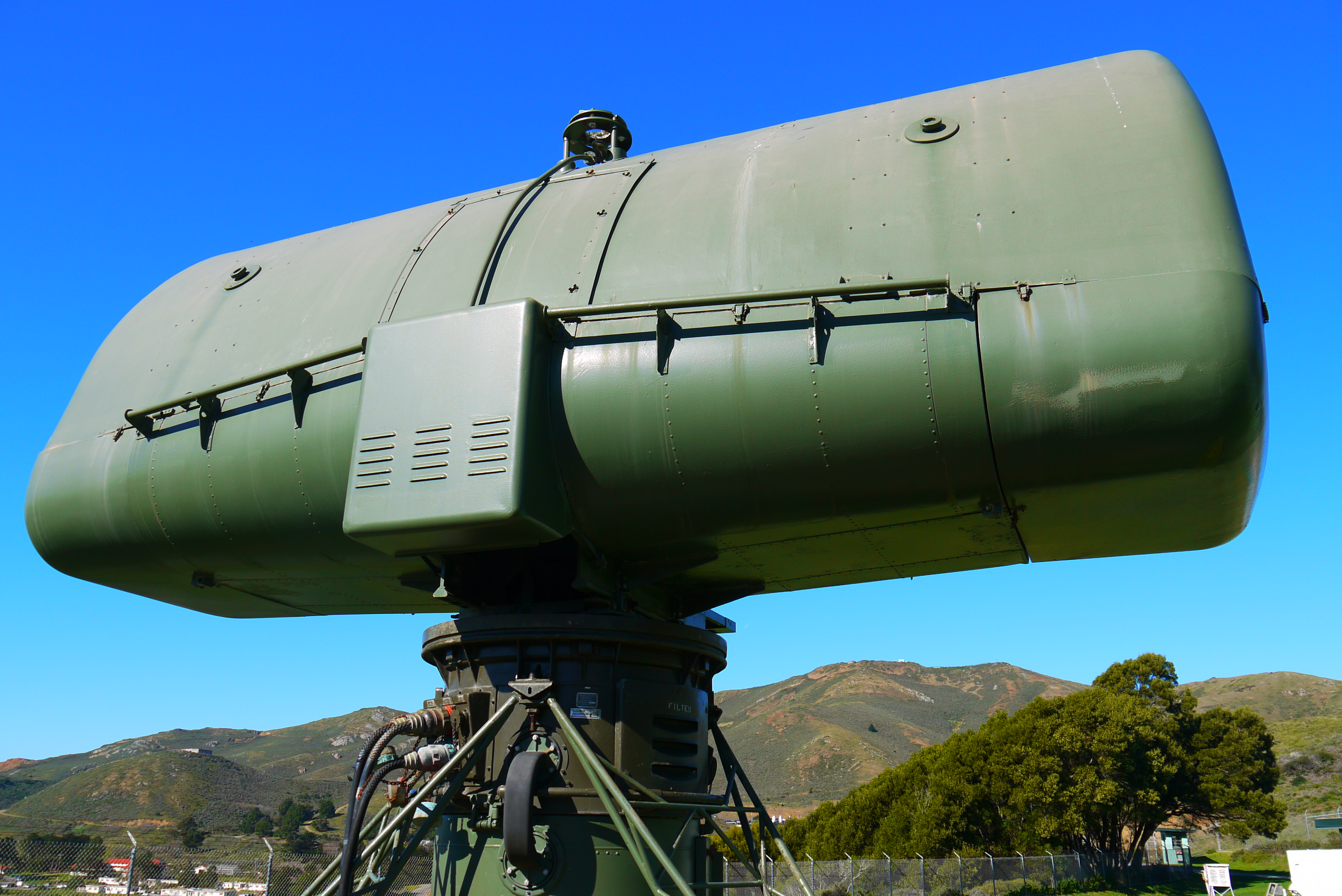
Low-powered acquisition radar (LOPAR) at SF-88L (relocated from SF-88C)

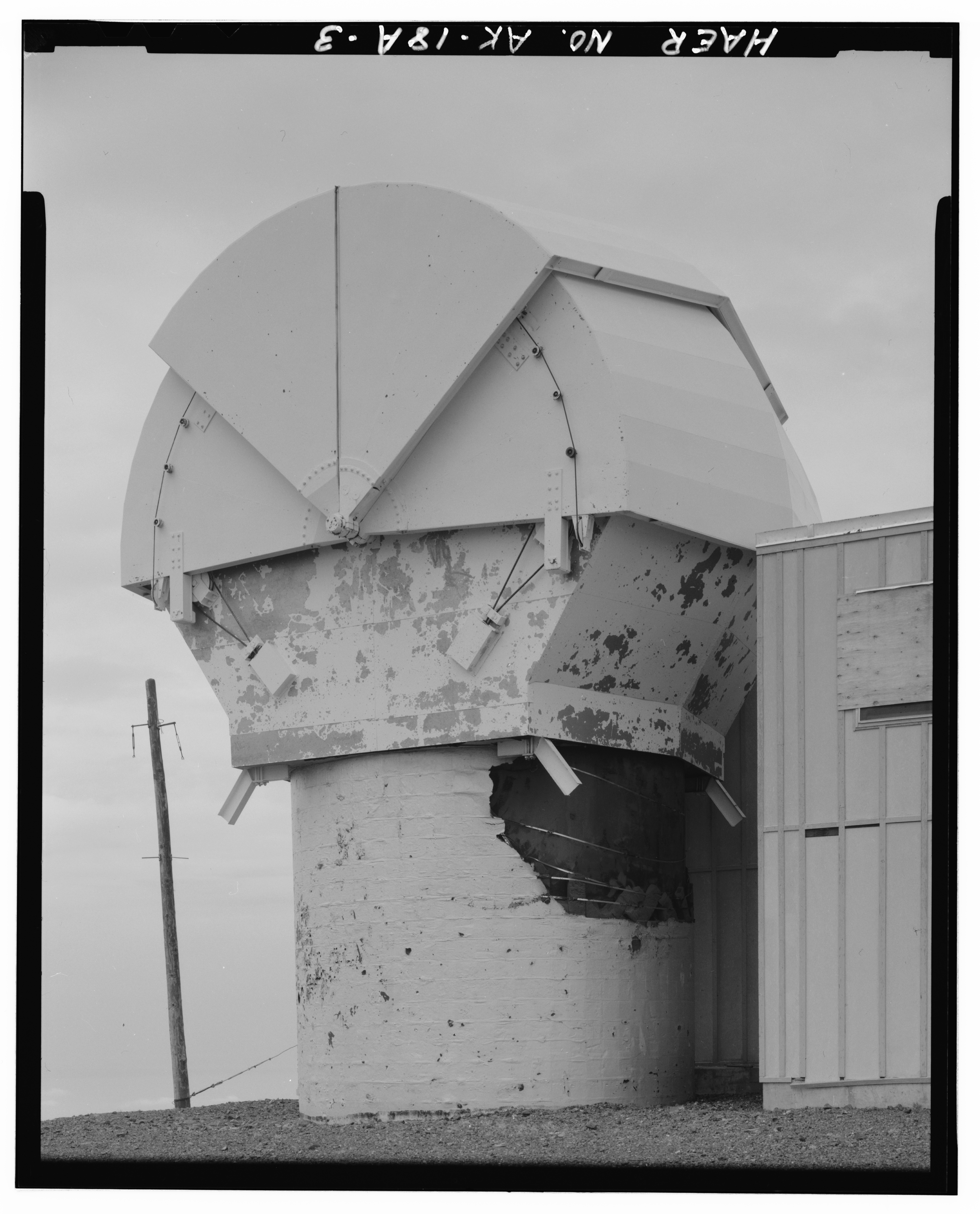
Clam shell protecting radar at Summit Site near Anchorage, Alaska (1986)

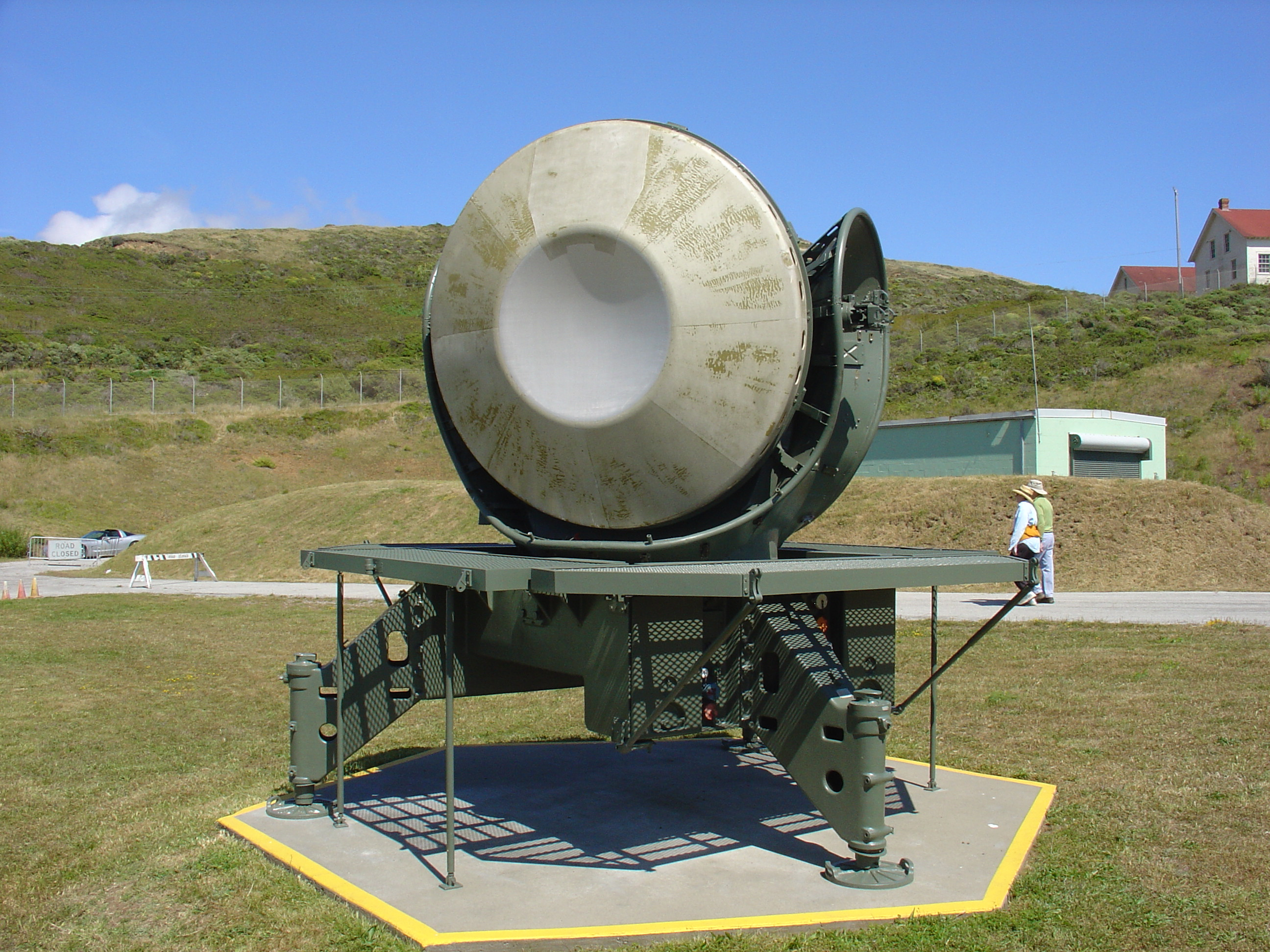
Another radar at SF-88

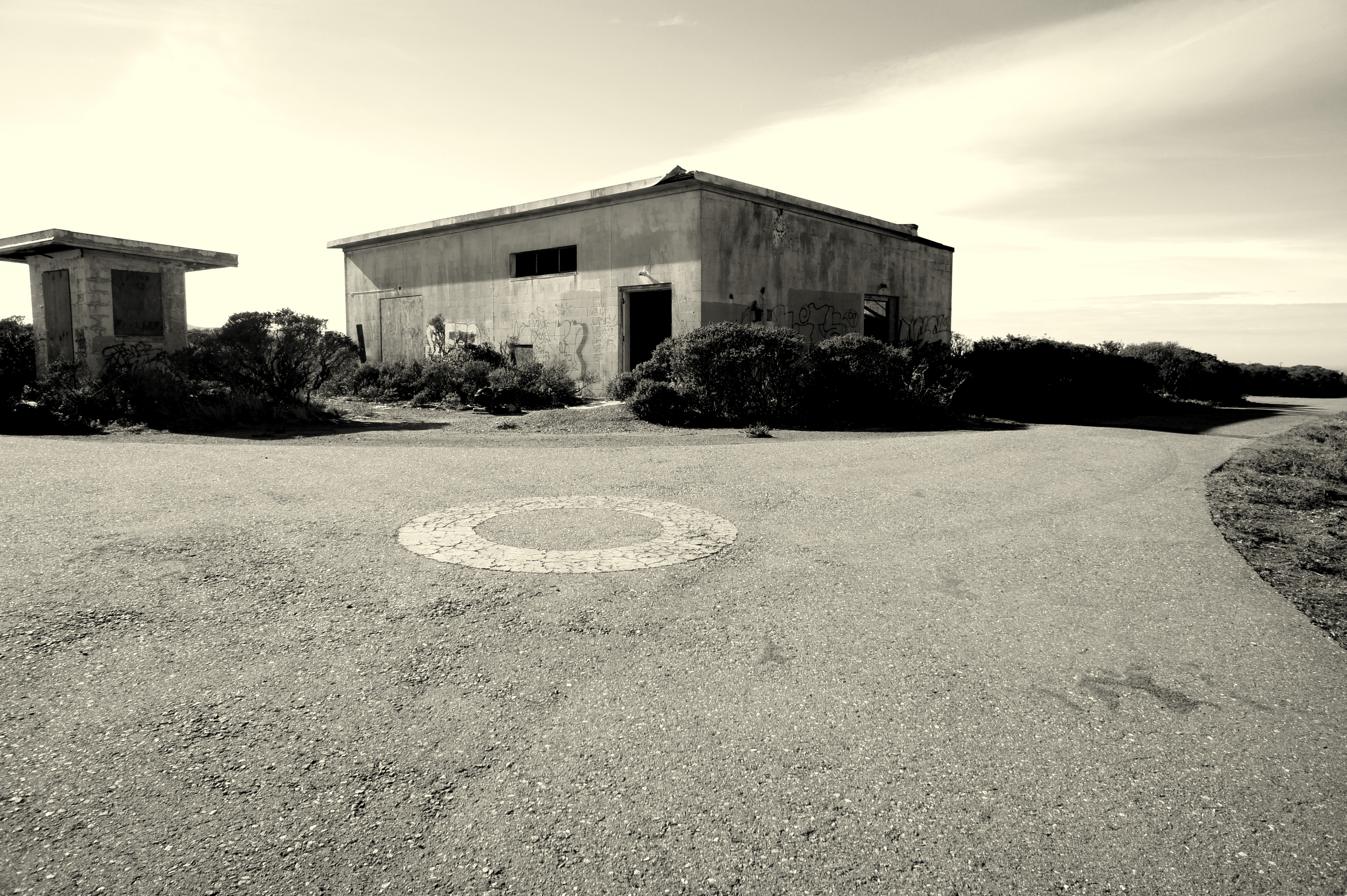
Control area SF-51C
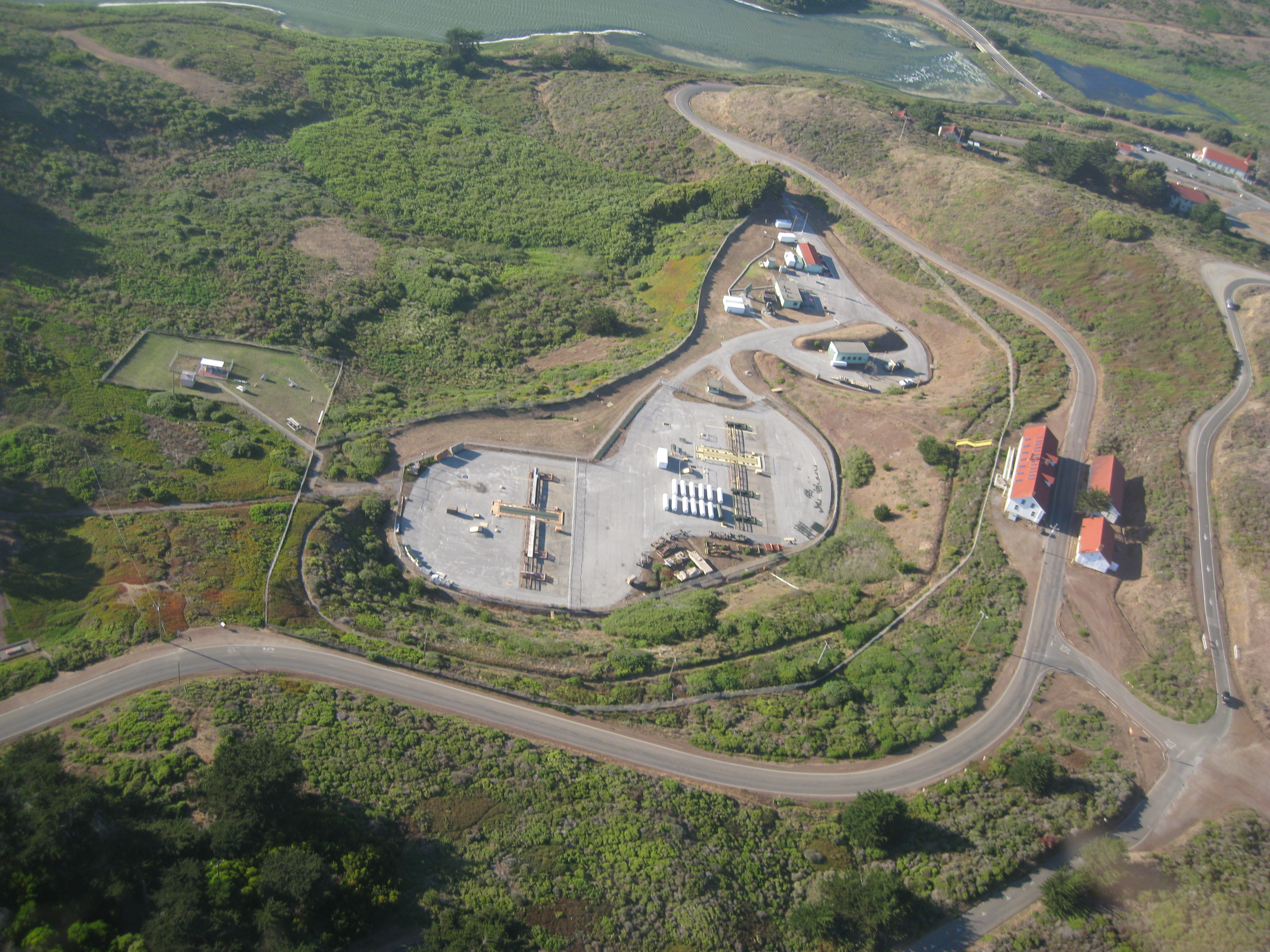
Aerial view of launch area at SF-88

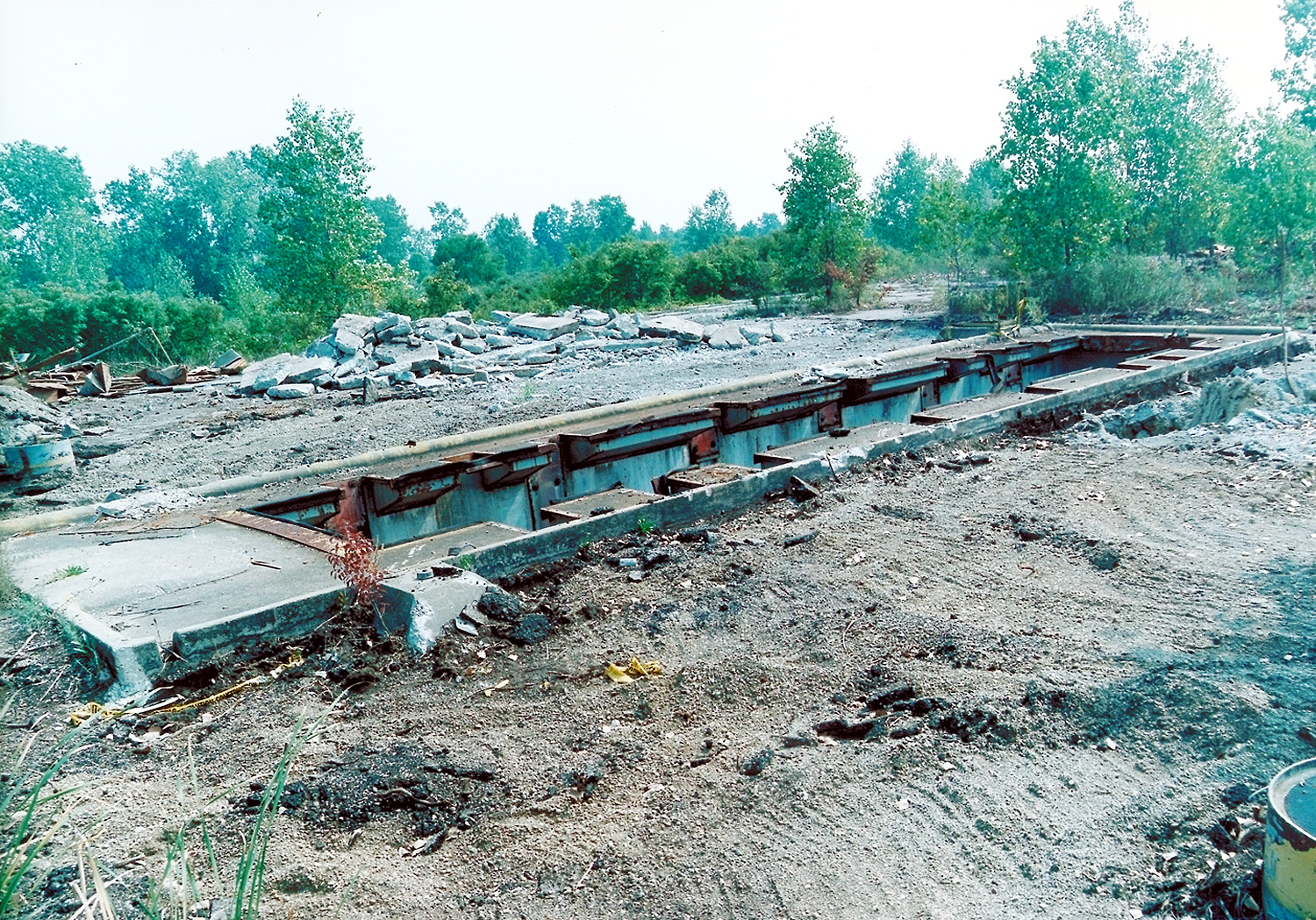
The elevator doors at former Nike site D-57/58 in Newport, Michigan, USA. At the time this picture was taken in 1996, the site was a hazardous waste cleanup site.

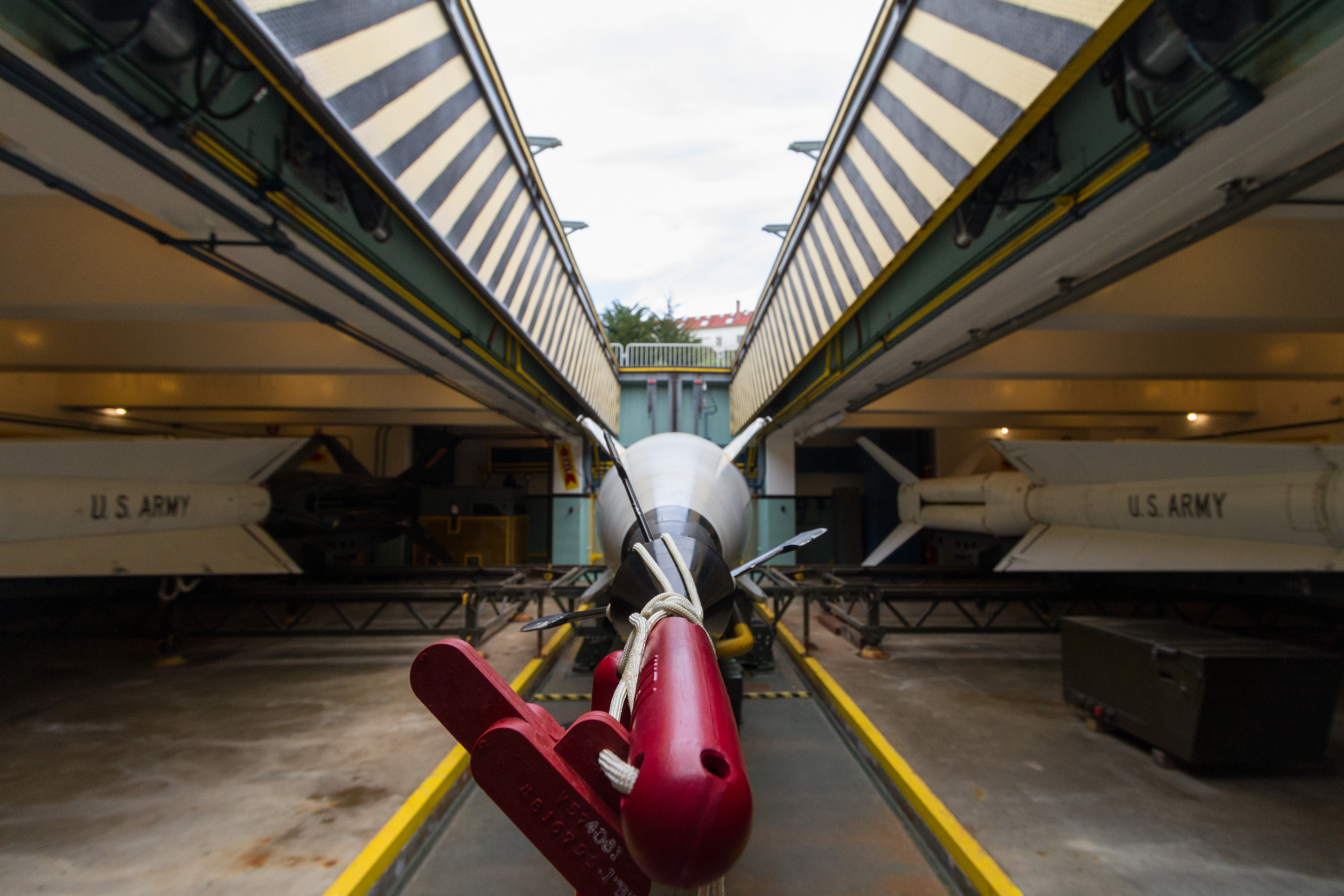
Underground missile storage at SF-88 below open elevator doors

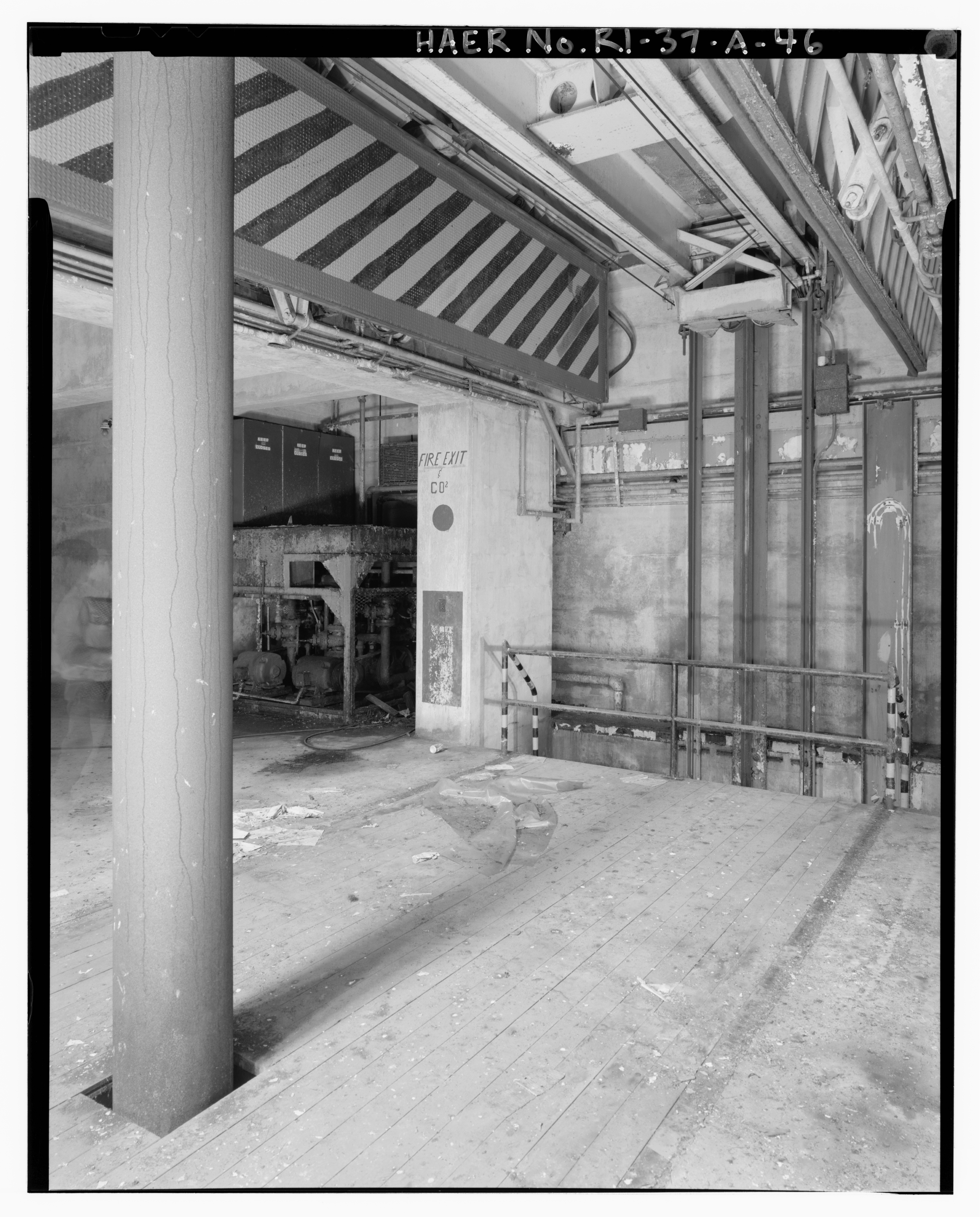
Elevator fully up with doors open at PR-79

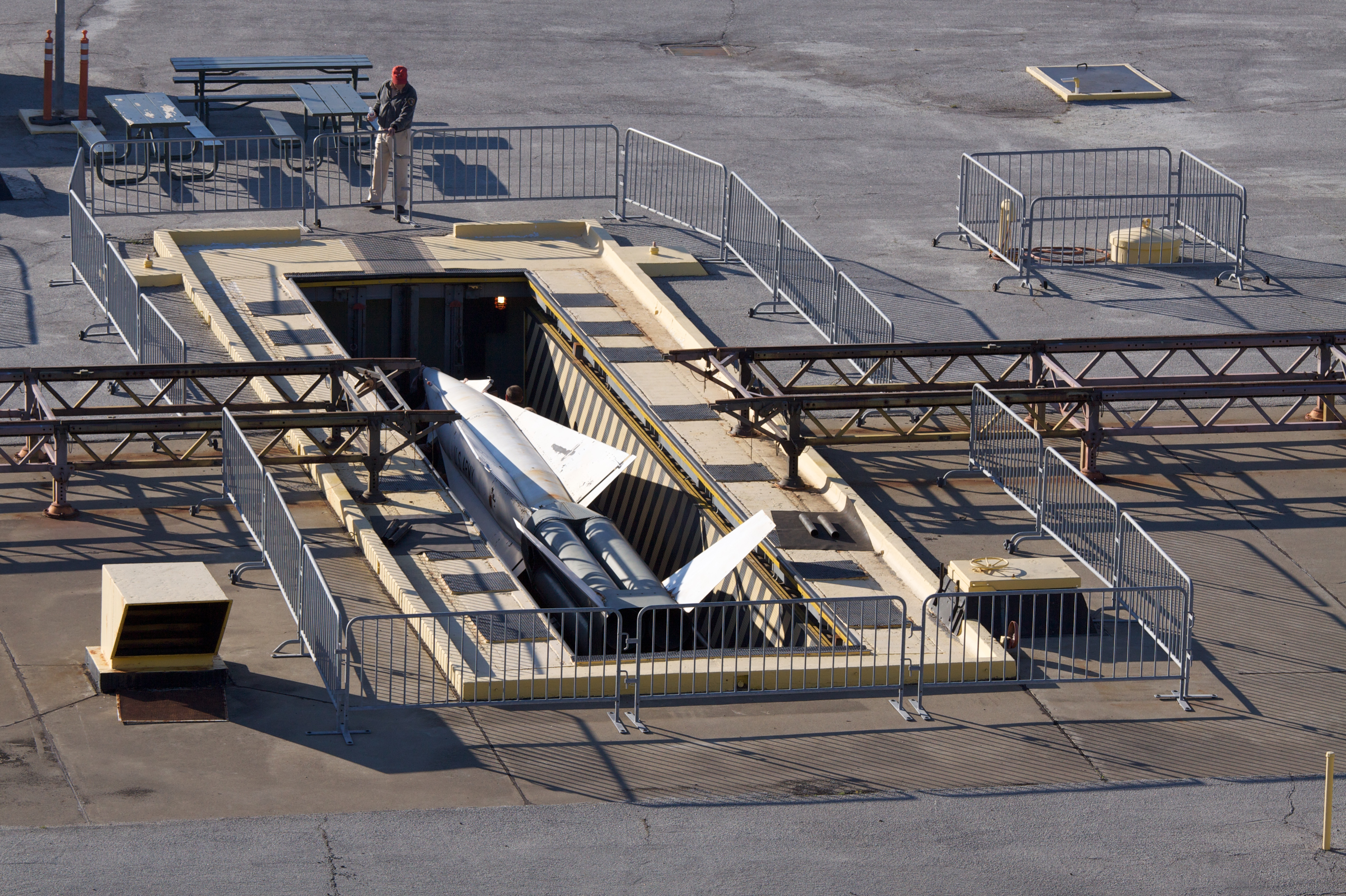
A missile emerges from the elevator at SF-88 (2008)

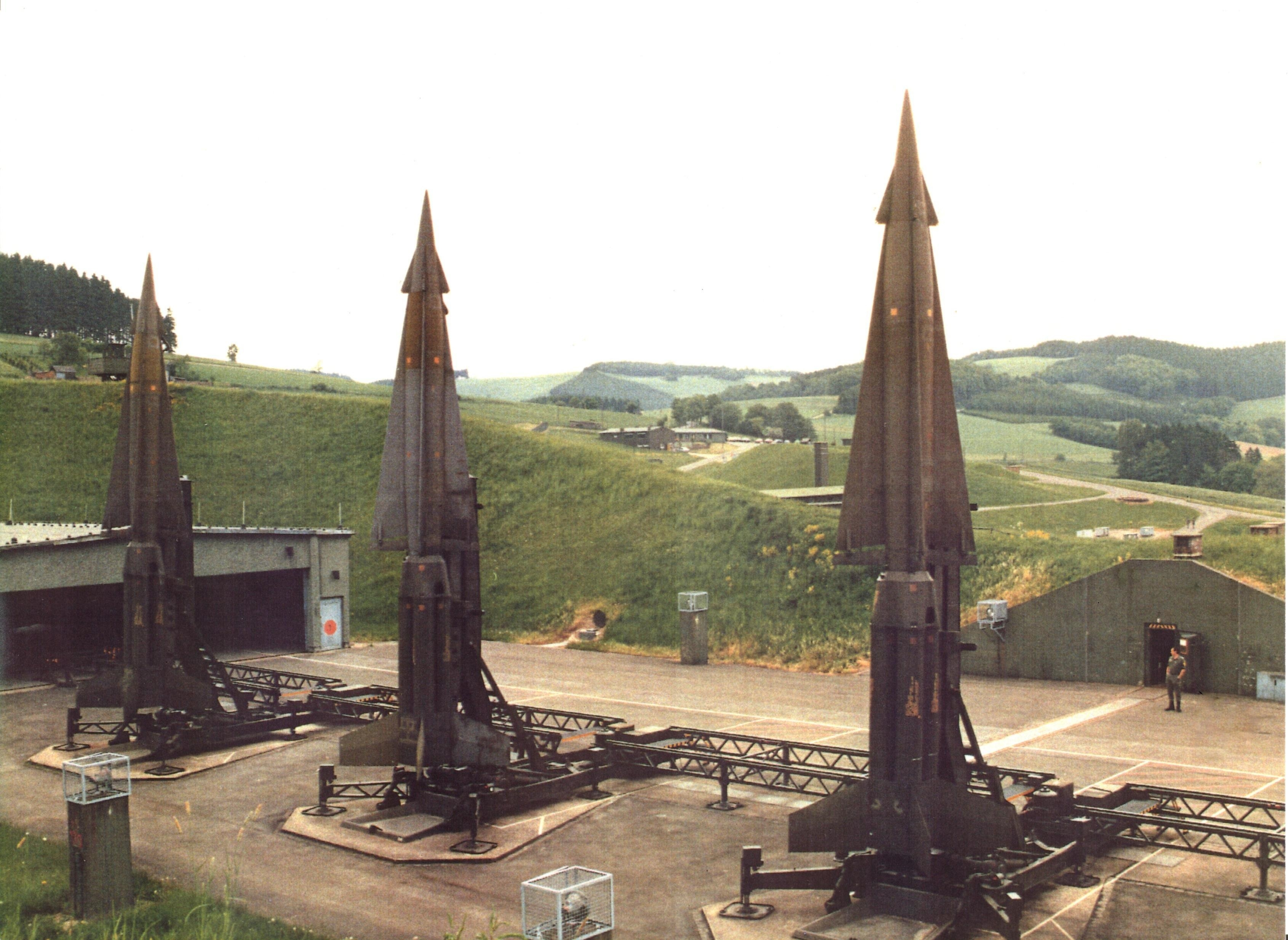
Three erected Nike-Hercules missiles on their launchers at Oedingen (1980).

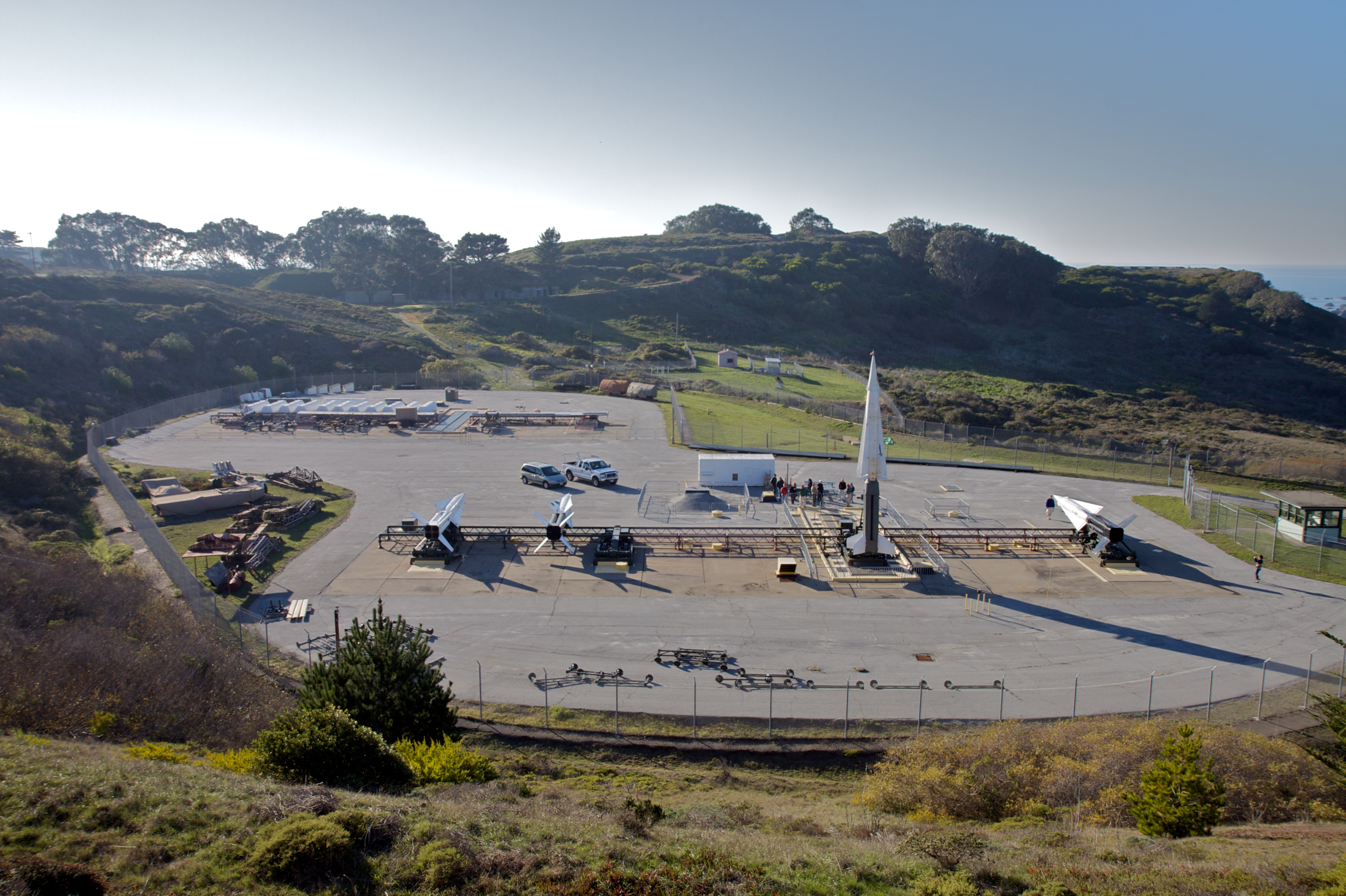
Two elevators and missile carriage rails at SF-88

The first Nike sites featured above-ground launchers. This quickly changed as land restrictions forced the Army to construct space-saving underground magazines. Capable of hosting 12 Nike Ajax missiles, each magazine had an elevator that lifted the missile to the surface in a horizontal position. Once above ground, the missile could be pushed manually along a railing to a launcher placed parallel to the elevator. Typically, four launchers sat atop the magazine. Near the launchers, a trailer housed the launch control officer and the controls he operated to launch missiles. In addition to the launch control trailer, the launch area contained a generator building with three diesel generators, frequency converters, and missile assembly and maintenance structures.

Because of the larger size of the Nike Hercules, an underground magazine's capacity was reduced to eight missiles. Thus storage racks, launcher rails, and elevators underwent modification to accept the larger missiles. Two additional features that readily distinguished newly converted sites were the double fence and the kennels housing dogs that patrolled the perimeter between the two fences.

The Nike Hercules was designed to use existing Nike Ajax facilities. With the greater range of the Nike Hercules allowing for wider area coverage, numerous Nike Ajax batteries were permanently deactivated. In addition, sites located further away from target areas were desirable due to the nuclear warheads carried by the missile. These batteries were placed in locations that optimized the missiles' range and minimized the warhead damage. Batteries at SAC bases and in Hawaii were installed in an outdoor configuration. In Alaska, a unique above-ground shelter configuration was provided for batteries guarding Anchorage and Fairbanks. Local Corps of Engineer districts supervised the conversion of Nike Ajax batteries and the construction of Nike Hercules batteries.

Nike missiles remained deployed around strategically important areas within the continental United States until 1974. The Alaskan sites were deactivated in 1978, and Florida sites stood down during the following year. Although the missile left the U.S. inventory, other nations maintained the missiles in their inventories into the early 1990s and sent their soldiers to the United States to conduct live-fire exercises at Fort Bliss.

Leftover traces of the approximately 265 Nike missile bases can still be seen around cities across the country. As the sites were decommissioned they were first offered to federal agencies. Many were already on Army National Guard bases who continued to use the property. Others were offered to state and local governments while others were sold to school districts. The left-overs were offered to private individuals. Thus many Nike sites are now municipal yards, communications and FAA facilities (the IFC areas), probation camps, and even renovated for use as airsoft gaming and MilSim training complexes. Several were obliterated and turned into parks. Some were converted into private residences. Only a few remain intact and preserve the history of the Nike project. There are also a few sites abroad, notably in Germany, Turkey and Greece.

Defense areas within the United States were:

- Anchorage Defense Area, AK
- Barksdale Defense Area, LA
- Bergstrom AFB Defense Area, TX
- Boston Defense Area, MA
- Bridgeport Defense Area, CT
- Chicago–Gary Defense Area, IL-IN
- Cincinnati–Dayton Defense Area, OH-IN
- Cleveland Defense Area, OH
- Dallas–Fort Worth Defense Area, TX
- Detroit Defense Area, MI
- Dyess AFB Defense Area, TX
- Ellsworth AFB Defense Area, SD
- Fairbanks Defense Area, AK
- Fairchild AFB Defense Area, WA
- Hanford Defense Area, WA
- Hartford Defense Area. CT
- Homestead–Miami Defense Area, FL
- Kansas City Defense Area, KS-MO
- Lincoln AFB Defense Area, NE
- Loring AFB Defense Area, ME
- Los Angeles Defense Area, CA
- Milwaukee Defense Area, WI
- Minneapolis–St.Paul Defense Area, MN
- New York Defense Area, NY
- Niagara Falls–Buffalo Defense Area, NY
- Norfolk Defense Area, VA
- Oahu Defense Area, HI
- Offutt AFB Defense Area, NE
- Philadelphia Defense Area, PA-NJ
- Pittsburgh Defense Area, PA
- Providence Defense Area, RI-MA
- Robins AFB Defense Area, GA
- St. Louis Defense Area, MO
- San Francisco Defense Area, CA
- Schilling AFB Defense Area, KS
- Seattle Defense Area, WA
- Travis AFB Defense Area, CA
- Turner AFB Defense Area, GA
- Walker AFB Defense Area, NM
- Washington–Baltimore Defense Area, MD-VA

== Nike booster motor as sounding rocket stage ==
The Nike boosters were also used as stages in sounding rockets as they became surplus starting in the 1950s in the following versions:

- Nike Apache (Argo-13)
- Nike-Asp (ASPAN)
- Nike Cajun
- Nike Deacon
- Nike Genie
- Nike Hawk
- Nike Hydac
- Nike Iroquois
- Nike Javelin
- Nike Malemute
- Nike Nike
- Nike Orion
- Nike Recruit
- Nike T40 T55
- Nike Tomahawk
- Nike Viper
- Nike-Python
- Nike-Yardbird
- Nike-Smoke

== Survivors ==
=== Bases ===
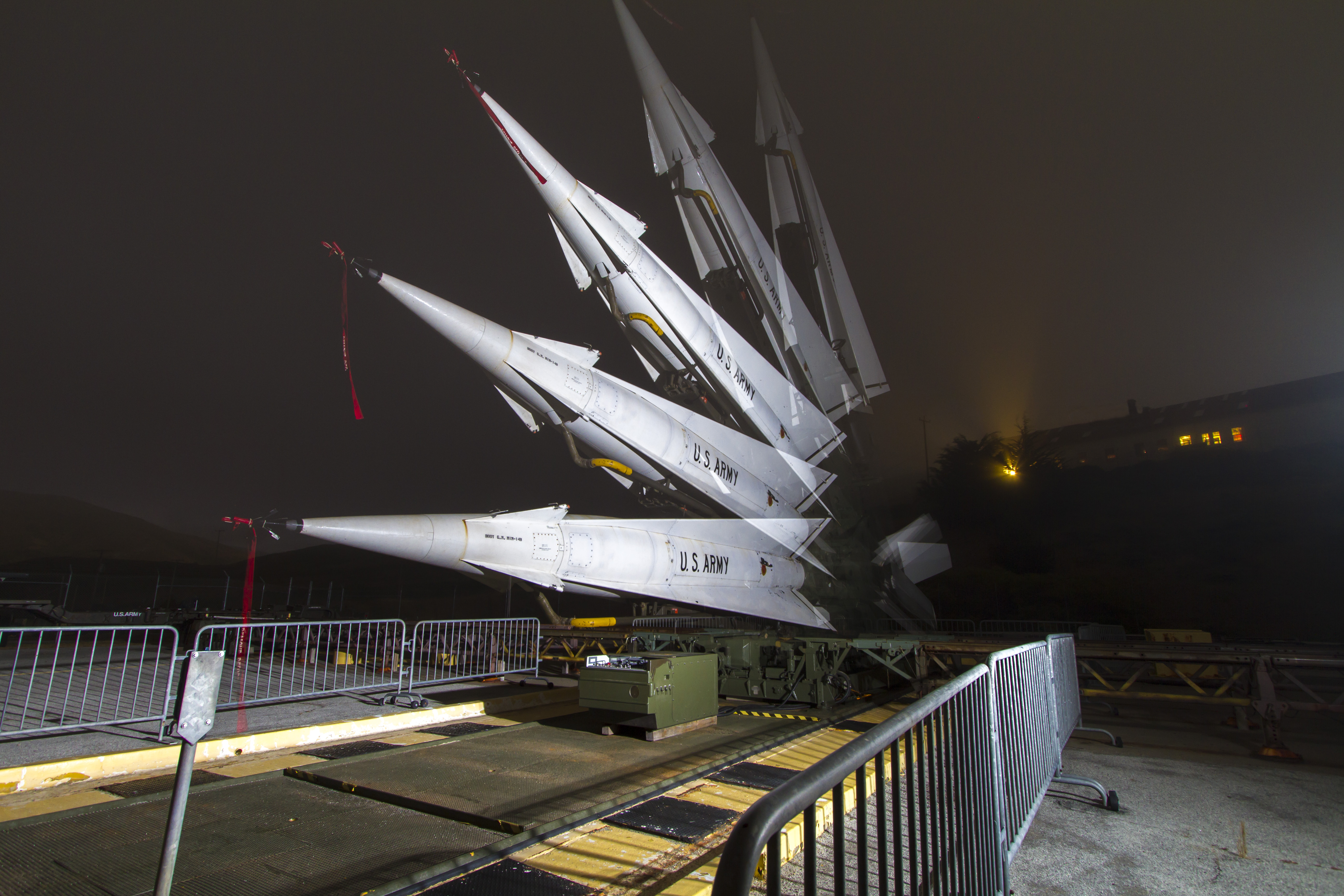
Multiple exposure photograph of a Nike-Hercules missile being erected for a simulated launch at SF-88L in 2012

- The best preserved Nike installation is site SF88L located in the Marin Headlands just west of the Golden Gate Bridge, north of San Francisco. The site is a museum and contains the missile bunkers and control area, as well as period uniforms and vehicles that would have operated at the site. The site has been preserved in the condition it was in at the time it was decommissioned in 1974. The site began as a Nike Ajax base and was later converted to Nike Hercules. Three Nike Hercules are displayed in the original bunkers. The base is open to the public, including demonstrations of the operational missile lift from the bunker to the surface.
- Another well-preserved site is NY-56 at Fort Hancock in Sandy Hook, New Jersey. The site has been restored and contains the original missile bunkers, as well as three Nike Ajax and a Nike Hercules on display. Each fall the base holds a Cold War Day. The site is on the National Register of Historic Places.
- HM69 in Everglades National Park has a Nike Hercules restored by George T. Baker Aviation School students. The Nike site is operated by the National Park Service.
- BA-79, located west of Baltimore in Granite, Maryland, is the most recently restored Nike missile base. Members of Civil Air Patrol, Maryland Wing and volunteers have reclaimed and painted the six missile magazines. BA-79 also has on display a Nike Ajax radar unit, an original Nike Hercules booster and a one-half size replica of a complete Nike Hercules missile. The original Warhead Assembly Building houses interpretive displays and the replica missile..

=== Missiles ===
- A Nike Zeus is on display at the Space Camp in Huntsville, Alabama.
- A Nike Ajax is on display in front of the VFW post in Hancock, Maryland.
- A Nike Ajax and Hercules are on display at the Dutch Air Force Museum in Soesterberg Air Base.
- A Nike Hercules on its transporter (trailer) is on display outside a public storage (former site MS-20) facility in Roberts, Wisconsin.
- A Nike Hercules is on display in a park in St. Bonifacius, Minnesota.
- A Nike Ajax missile is on display at Richard Montgomery High School in Rockville, Maryland.
- One unit is preserved in Eskişehir Aviation Park.

== See also ==
- Wasserfall was a World War II German project for a surface-to-air missile.
- Missile guidance – (United States)
- S-25 Berkut – (Soviet Union)
- Soviet Air Defence Forces
- ABM-1 Galosh – (Soviet Union)
- List of U.S. military vehicles by supply catalog designation (G-789)
- Cold War Museum
- List of U.S. Army Rocket Launchers By Model Number

== Sources ==
- Cagle, Mary T. (1959). Nike Ajax Historical Monograph Development, Production, and Development of the Nike Ajax Guidedd Missile System 1945 - 1959. U.S. Army Missile Command, Redstone Arsenal, Alabama.
- Cagle, Mary T. (1973). History of the Nike Hercules Weapon System. U.S. Army Aviation and Missile Life Cycle Management Command, Redstone Arsenal, Alabama.
- Mueller, Colone Michal P. (2013). Vigilant and Indestructable. U.S. Army Aviation and Missile Life Cycle Management Command, Redstone Arsenal, Alabama.
- Unknown, Unknown (1970). Historical Information Nike R&D Programs White Sands Missile Range 1946 - 1970. White Sands Missile Range, New Mexico.
- To NIKE the U.S. Army's Guided Missile System. A Western Electric Compay.
- Morgan, Mark L.; Berhow, Mark A. (2002). Rings of Supersonic Steel, 2nd Edition. Hole in the Head Press. ISBN 0-615-12012-1.
- John C. Lonnquest, David F. Winkler (November 1996). To Defend and Deter: The Legacy of the United States Cold War Missile Program (USA-Cerl Special Report, N-97/01,1. USACERL.
