= North Truro Air Force Station =

Radar station in Massachusetts, US 1951–1994

North Truro Air Force Station
- Part of Air Defense Command (ADC)
- North Truro, Massachusetts
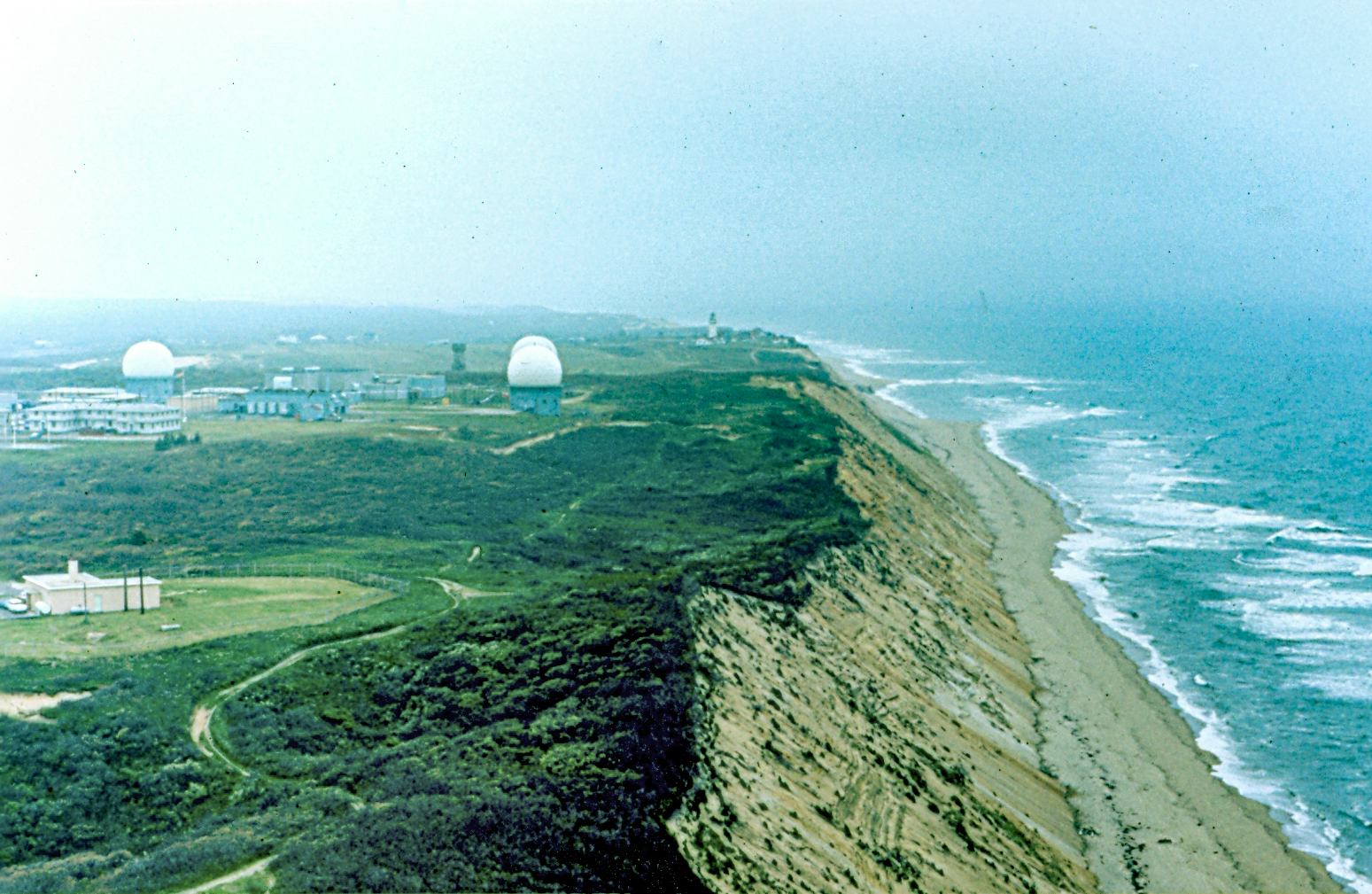
- The station from the south

Site information
- Type: Long Range Radar Site
- Code: ADC ID: P-10 NORAD ID: Z-10 (NTAFS)
- Owner: National Park Service
- Controlled by: United States Air Force
- Open to the public: No, only viewable from exterior

Location
- Location of North Truro AFS, Massachusetts
- Coordinates: 42°01′53.38″N 70°03′11.84″W

Site history
- Built: 1951
- Built by: United States Air Force
- In use: 1951–1994

Garrison information
- Garrison: North Truro, Massachusetts
- Occupants: 762d Radar Squadron, 6th Space Warning Squadron

North Truro Air Force Station (AFS) is a closed United States Air Force General Surveillance Radar station. It is located 2.2 mi (3.5 km) east of North Truro, Massachusetts.

Most of the site was inactivated by 1994 and turned over to the National Park Service, the radar site remainder becoming a Federal Aviation Administration (FAA) VHF omnidirectional range/Tactical air navigation system (VORTAC) (Navaid: LFV) and radar site, part of the Joint Surveillance System (JSS), designated by NORAD as Eastern Air Defense Sector (EADS) Ground Equipment Facility J-53.

The former North Truro AFS is the site of a radar station and several abandoned buildings including barracks, a library, a bar, a bowling alley and a family housing area located to the south. NTAFS has been redeveloped into The Highland Center. It is also the site of the Jenny Lind Tower.

== History ==
North Truro AFS was one of the first of twenty-four stations of the permanent Air Defense Command (ADC) radar network. On 2 December 1948, the Air Force directed the Army Corps of Engineers to proceed with construction of this and twenty-three other sites around the periphery of the United States.

The 762d Aircraft Control and Warning Squadron (AC&W Sq) began operations with a pair of World War II Air Transportable Search and Detection AN/CPS-3 radars at North Truro in 1951 and assumed radar coverage previously covered by a temporary Lashup Radar Network site at Otis Air Force Base (L-5), and initially the station functioned as a Ground-Control Intercept (GCI) and warning station. As a GCI station, the squadron's role was to guide interceptor aircraft toward unidentified intruders picked up on the unit's radar scopes. In 1955 these units were joined by an AN/FPS-8 model. Eventually converted to an AN/GPS-3, this radar left service in 1960. In 1956 a GE CPS-6B search radar was the main search radar.

North Truro AFS was the operational parent station for Texas Tower 2 (TT-2) offshore in the Atlantic Ocean from May 1956-15 January 1963. TT-2 was operated as an annex of the 762d AC&W Sq, its offshore personnel assigned to a flight of the 762d, although the facility was logistically supported by the 4604th Support Squadron (Texas Towers) at Otis AFB.

The years 1958 and 1959 saw the arrival of AN/FPS-6 and 6A height-finder radars. During 1958 North Truro AFS joined the Semi Automatic Ground Environment (SAGE) system, feeding data to DC-02 at Stewart AFB, New York. After joining, the squadron was redesignated as the 762d Radar Squadron (SAGE) on 15 December 1958. The radar squadron provided information 24/7 the SAGE Direction Center where it was analyzed to determine range, direction altitude speed and whether or not aircraft were friendly or hostile.

In 1960 the 762d started operating an AN/FPS-7 radar. In 1963 the height-finder radars were replaced by AN/FPS-26A and AN/FPS-90 sets. In 1966, after the installation of a Burroughs AN/GSA-51 computer system, North Truro AFS became the first ADC installation configured as a Backup Interceptor Control (BUIC) BUIC II site. BUIC II radar sites were capable of incorporating data feeds from other radar sectors directly onto their radar screens. In 1968, North Truro also became the first radar station to be designated a BUIC III installation. These sites hosted the more capable Burroughs D825 digital computer and could support operations at eleven control consoles. During the early 1970s two BUIC sites were designated to serve as backup to each of the remaining six SAGE centers.

The 762nd Radar Sq was inactivated and replaced by the 762d Air Defense Group in March 1970. The upgrade to group status was done because of North Truro AFS' status as a Backup Interceptor Control (BUIC) site. It utilized BUIC III equipment (Burroughs D828 Computer system) for command and control of air defense aircraft in the event that the SAGE Direction Center at Hancock Field, NY was inoperable. The unit commander and in times of Level IV operations, overall air defense commander for the NORAD region, was Col. Alva D. Henehan (1969–71?). The group was inactivated and replaced by the 762nd Radar Squadron again in 1974 as BUIC sites were being removed from service and defenses against crewed bombers were reduced. The group was disbanded in 1984.

In addition to the main facility, NTAFS operated three unstaffed AN/FPS-14 Gap Filler sites:

- Westboro, MA (P-10A) 42°14′23″N 071°37′41″W
- Fort Dearborn, NH (P-10B) 43°02′49″N 070°42′58″W
- Chilmark, MA (P-10E) 41°21′19″N 070°44′07″W

Fort Dearborn was the former Rye AFS, which had closed in 1957. Westboro closed in June 1962, the others in June 1968.

Over the years, the equipment at the station was upgraded or modified to improve the efficiency and accuracy of the information gathered by the radars. Routine operations continued and in 1979 the site came under Tactical Air Command jurisdiction as a result of the inactivation of Aerospace Defense Command and the site became part of ADTAC. By 1985 AN/FPS-107 had been replaced by an AN/FPS-91A search set operated by the FAA. The AN/FPS-116 was removed c. 1988

=== Operation Have Horn ===
In 1969 North Truro Air Force Station was the location of Operation Have Horn, the launching of sounding rockets under project Nike Hydac. On completion of the operation in 1970, the used devices and equipment were returned to the White Sands Missile Range.

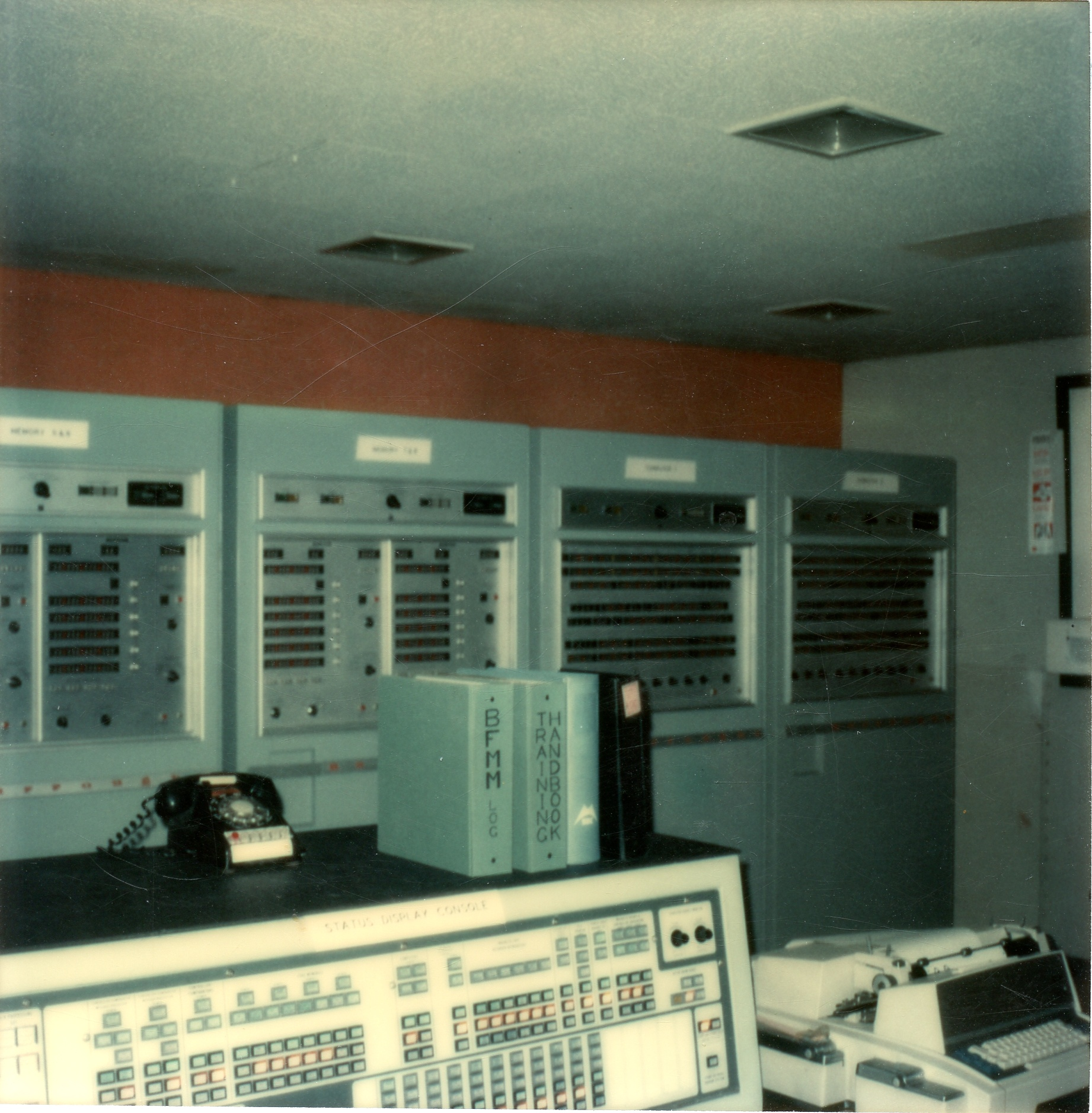
Back-Up Interceptor Control III. At North Truro AFS shortly before shutdown. Background l->r Cabinets Memory 5&6, Memory 7&8, Computer 1, Computer 2. Foreground: Status Display Console, Teletype. Cabinets are about 3' wide, 3' deep, & 7' high. Manufactured by Burroughs

== Closure ==
After the end of the Cold War, in 1994, the Air Force closed down operations at North Truro. Most of the land was transferred to the National Park Service. In the late 1990s, an ARSR-4 replaced the AN/FPS-91A, when it joined the Joint Surveillance System (JSS).

Several of the facilities have fallen into disrepair while some are in the process of renovation. The Gap Filler at Westboro is intact and has what appears to be a water tower and several radio broadcasting towers. The other two Gap Filler sites have been obliterated and redeveloped. The former Texas Tower No. 2 (TT-2) troposcatter communications site, just south of the housing area, is also accessible on foot. All that remain of the tropo facility are the building foundation (a concrete pad with a few floor tiles) and three-each concrete footings for the three tropo dish antennas. At the main site, the fence around the former cantonment and technical areas has a gate on the ocean-facing side. All of the original USAF radar towers are gone. The only radar tower now is the ARSR-4. The buildings are each in various conditions, however all are in derelict condition with the exception of the few buildings that are being repaired. The homes in the family housing area are falling apart and some have been vandalized. A few buildings had been torn down, including the station chapel. The National Seashore intends to remove most of the remaining buildings as soon as funds are available. The former GATR site located approximately 1.2 miles southeast of the base at Longnook Beach has been demolished, and all of the radio poles have been removed. The site is now home to an FAA NAVAID station.

== Redevelopment ==
NTAFS itself was given to the Cape Cod National Seashore and is now being redeveloped into the Highlands Center. This project includes the building of a performing arts center, and other facilities to meet the needs of the National Park Service as well as the community. This facility however does not have running water. It is also home to an FAA long-range radar site.

From 2012 to 2013, the former station was home to a Department of Energy study by the Atmospheric Radiation Measurement Climate Research Facility along with the Pacific Northwest National Laboratory on air particles over the region.

== Units and assignments ==
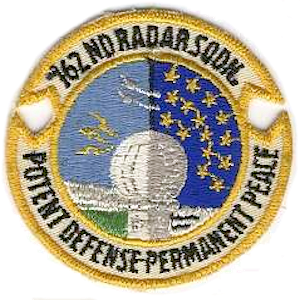
762d Radar Squadron emblem

=== Units ===
- Constituted as the 762d Aircraft Control & Warning Squadron on 14 November 1950

Activated on 27 November 1950
Redesignated 762d Radar Squadron (SAGE) on 15 December 1958
Inactivated on 1 March 1970
Redesignated 762nd Radar Squadron on 1 January 1974
Activated on 17 January 1974
Inactivated on 1 July 1984

- Constituted as the 762d Air Defense Group on 13 February 1970

Activated on 1 March 1970
Inactivated on 1 January 1974
Disbanded on 27 September 1984

- 6th Space Warning Squadron (Detachment 1)

Organized 1977
Discontinued 1985

=== Assignments ===
- 762nd Squadron

540th Aircraft Control and Warning Group, 27 November 1950
32d Air Division, 6 February 1952
4704th Defense Wing, 16 February 1953
4622d Air Defense Wing, 18 October 1956
Boston Air Defense Sector, 8 January 1957
35th Air Division, 1 April 1966
21st Air Division, 19 November 1969 – 1 March 1970
21st Air Division 17 January 1974
24th Air Division 23 September 1983 – 1 July 1984

- 762nd Group

21st Air Division, 1 March 1970 – 17 January 1974

== See also ==
- Rocket launch sites
- List of USAF Aerospace Defense Command General Surveillance Radar Stations
- List of United States Air Force aircraft control and warning squadrons
- List of military installations in Massachusetts
