= Niki =

Niki may refer to:

== People ==
- Niki (given name)
- Niki (singer) (born 1999), Indonesian singer-songwriter
- Ni-Ki (born 2005), Japanese singer and member of the South Korean boy band Enhypen

== Places ==
- Niki, Hokkaido, a town in Japan
- Niki, Florina, a village in Greece

== Other uses ==
- Niki (airline), formerly a passenger airline based at Vienna Airport in Austria, which ceased trading in 2017
- Operation Niki, a Greek airlift operation during the Turkish invasion of Cyprus in 1974
- Niki Rotor Aviation, a Bulgarian aircraft manufacturer
- SS Niki, a Greek cargo ship in service 1920–37
- Niki and Gabi, an American singing duo
- Niki & The Dove, a Swedish indietronica group
- niki.ai, an Indian ecommerce platform
- Typhoon Niki (1996), a tropical cyclone in the Western Pacific Ocean
- Niki (Greek political party), Greek political party, romanization of the Greek word Νίκη (victory)
- FSM Niki, the Australian-market name for the Polski Fiat 126p, a small car

== See also ==
- Nike (disambiguation)
- Nikki (disambiguation)
- Nicki (disambiguation)
