= North Truro, Massachusetts =

Village in Cape Cod, Massachusetts

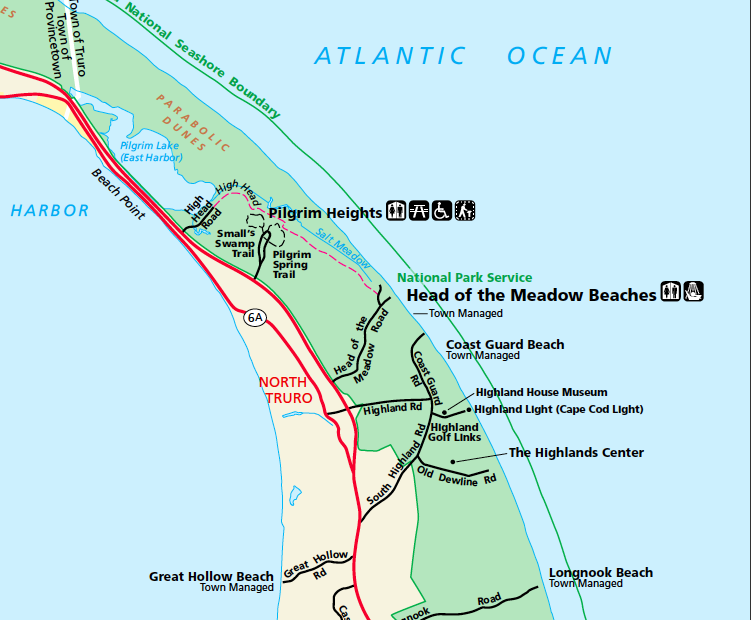

Summer sunset along Beach Point, North Truro

Early evening at Head of the Meadow beach, North Truro

North Truro is a village in the town of Truro, Massachusetts, United States. Due to its proximity to urbanized Provincetown, it is somewhat more densely developed than the rest of the town, with houses and small resort facilities lining the two main thoroughfares, U.S. Route 6 and MA Route 6A. It is home to Truro Vineyards, one of two operating wineries (the other is in Falmouth) on Cape Cod. North Truro is located at 42°03′35″N 70°08′31″W.

Over half of the land area of the town is part of the Cape Cod National Seashore (the area shown in green on the map), established in 1961 by President John F. Kennedy, and administered by the U.S. National Park Service. The large impoundment of East Harbor (a.k.a. Pilgrim Lake) is a prominent feature while passing through on the main highway, Route 6.

From December 1969 until early 1970, North Truro was the location of Operation Have Horn, the launching of sounding rockets under project Nike-Hydac. On completion of the operation, the used devices were returned to the White Sands Missile Range. These experiments were conducted at the now closed North Truro Air Force Station.

North Truro is also home to Highlands Links Golf Course, Massachusetts's oldest links course. The course runs along the highland cliffs on the Atlantic coast, and encompasses the Highland Light.

== See also ==
- Truro, Massachusetts
- Provincetown, Massachusetts
- Cape Cod National Seashore
- Rocket launch sites
