= Nikas =

Nikas may refer to:

== Surname ==
- Ilias Nikas (born 1964), Greek judoka
- Jason Nikas (1972–2023), American actor, model, and production designer
- Panny Nikas (born 1988), Australian footballer

== Given name ==
- Nikas Safronov (born 1956), Soviet and Russian artist
- Nikas Ghimire (born 2006), Tech enthusiast from Nepal
- Nikasha Rathore, fictional character in the 2005 Indian film Ek Ajnabee

== Places ==
- Tulsiyahi Nikas, is a village development committee in Dhanusa District in the Janakpur Zone of south-eastern Nepal

== See also ==
- Hisab Nikas, is a 1982 Indian Odia-language film
- Nika (disambiguation)
