= Nika =

Nika may refer to:

== People and fictional characters ==
- Nika (given name), including a list of people and fictional characters with the given name or nickname
- Nika (surname), a list of people
- Nika King, stage name of 21st century American actress and comedian Shenika Williams
- Rakitina Nika, pen name of science fiction and fantasy writer Ludmila Bogdanova (born 1963)

== Places ==
- Nika District, Pakticka Province, Afghanistan
- Neka, also known as Nīkā, a city in Mazandaran Province, Iran

== Other uses ==
- Nike (mythology), or Nika, the goddess of victory
- Nika Award, a Russian film award
- Nika (film), a 2022 Russian biographical drama
- NIKA Racing, a Swedish car racing team
- AS Nika, a football club in Kisangani, Democratic Republic of Congo
- List of storms named Nika

== See also ==
- Nika riots, riots that took place over the course of a week in Constantinople in 532
- John Rangihau (1919–1987), New Zealand academic and Māori leader also known as Te Nika
- Nikka (disambiguation)
- Nikas (disambiguation)
- Nike (disambiguation)
