= Nika Petrović =

Serbian politician (born 1987)

Nika Petrović (Serbian Cyrillic: Ника Петровић; born 1987), formerly known as Nika Orelj, is a politician in Serbia. She has served in the Assembly of Vojvodina since 2020 as a member of the Serbian Progressive Party.

== Private career ==
Petrović has a Bachelor of Laws degree. She lives in Apatin.

== Politician ==
=== Municipal politics ===
Petrović received the twelfth position on the Progressive Party's electoral list for the Apatin municipal assembly in the 2016 Serbian local elections and was elected when the list won exactly twelve mandates. She was chosen as deputy speaker when the assembly convened in May 2016 and was promoted to speaker in December 2017. She was not a candidate for re-election at the local level in 2020.

=== Assembly of Vojvodina ===
Petrović was awarded the thirty-fifth position on the Progressive Party's Aleksandar Vučić — For Our Children list in the 2020 Vojvodina provincial election and was elected when the list won a majority victory with seventy-six out of 120 mandates. In October 2020, she was chosen as chair of the assembly committee on administration and local self-government. She is also a member of the committee on issues of the constitutional and legal status of the province.
