= Nike-Hawk =

Nike Hawk is the designation of an American sounding rocket. It has an apogee of 160 km, a liftoff thrust of 217 kN, a total mass of 1100 kg and a total length of 9.00 m. It is a two-stage rocket made from a Nike and a Hawk anti-aircraft missile motor, and was designed to launch a 90-kg research payload to an altitude of 160 km.
