= Niku =

Niku may refer to:

- An alternate transliteration of Necho II, King of Egypt
- A common verbal and written shorthand for Nikumaroro island
- Niku, a business automation company acquired by CA, Inc. (Computer Associates) in 2005
- The Norwegian Institute for Cultural Heritage Research (Norsk institutt for kulturminneforskning - NIKU)
- "niku" (肉) means "meat" in Japanese
  - Nickname of character Sena Kashiwazaki from Haganai novel/anime series.
- Niku, a nickname for Nikumaroro, formerly known as Gardner Island
- 471325 Taowu, a trans-Neptunian object that was nicknamed "Niku" (Chinese word for "rebellious").

== People with the name ==
- Niku Kheradmand, Iranian actress and film dubber
- Niku Kruger, South African-born American rugby player
- Tapani Niku, Finnish cross-country skier (bronze medal in 1924 Winter Olympics)
