= Nike-Hydac =

Nike Hydac is the designation of an American sounding rocket with two stages, based upon the Nike Ajax booster. The Nike Hydac was launched 87 times from many missile sites. Such sites were White Sands Missile Range, Poker Flat Research Range ("Poker Flats"), Kwajalein Missile Range, Cassino Site - Rio Grande Airport, Brazil, and from North Truro Air Force Station in Massachusetts during Operation Have Horn in 1969.

The directing agency for Nike Hydac was the Air Force Cambridge Research Laboratories, (AFCRL) Cambridge, Massachusetts. The AFCRL began its origins to the Cambridge Field Station in 1945 to analyze and study Massachusetts Institute of Technology (MIT) wartime efforts on electronic countermeasures and atmospheric research.

== Nike platform ==
Section source: Astronautix

- Type: two stage
  - Stage 1: Nike - solid propellant rocket stage, loaded/empty mass 599/256 kg
  - Stage 2: Hydac - solid propellant rocket stage, loaded mass 300 kg
- Gross mass: 900 kg (1,980 lb)
- Height: 9.10 m (29.80 ft)
- Diameter: 0.42 m (1.37 ft)
- Thrust: 217.00 kN (48,783 lbf)
- Apogee: 150 km (90 mi)
- First date: 1966-11-05
- Last date: 1983-06-16
- Number: 87 launches

== Other Nike sounding rockets ==
- Nike-Apache
- Nike-Asp
- Nike-Cajun
- Nike-Deacon
- Nike-Iroquois
- Nike Javelin
- Nike Malemute
- Nike-Nike
- Nike Orion
- Nike Recruit
- Nike T40 T55
- Nike Tomahawk
- Nike Viper
