= Marily Nika =

Greek computational scientist

Marily Nika FRSA
- Μαρίλη Νίκα
- Born: Athens, Greece
- Education: Imperial College London; University of Piraeus
- Employer: Google
- Website: www.marilynika.com

Marily Nika is a Greek computer scientist and product manager who works for Google in augmented reality, specializing in speech technologies and artificial intelligence.

== Early life and education ==
Marily Nika grew up in Athens, Greece and attended University of Piraeus for her undergraduate studies and Imperial College London for her Ph.D. Growing up, she always demonstrated a unique passion and competence in programming. In 2011, Nika was the first Greek woman to receive Google's Anita Borg Scholarship, which allowed her to pursue a Ph.D. at Imperial College London. During her time at Imperial College, she created the Women in Computing group that aimed to support the College's women, and as part of this Nika organized various events including the UK's first ever female-only hackathon. Moreover, she launched the London Geekettes, a local chapter of a global network called the Geekettes. In 2020, she became the co-founder of the larger organization, Geekettes. In 2015, Nika created the computing curriculum for several British schools as part of Little Miss Geek.

In 2014, Nika completed her Ph.D. Her research focused on explaining by maths and epidemiology how content goes viral online. Her Ph.D. research was published as a book by Lambert Academic Publishing and was also presented at TEDxAthens in 2014.

== Career ==
Nika completed a Ph.D. internship in data science at Facebook in 2014, and then joined Google's speech team full-time as an AI product manager working on a series of Google Assistant and speech technologies features. At the same time, she is a Teaching Fellow at Harvard Business School where she teaches a forum series in Product Management. She also teaches Product Management at O'Reilly Media.

Nika is a three-time TEDx Speaker (TEDxZurich 2013, TEDxAthens 2014, TEDxImperialCollege 2015), a Teaching fellow at Harvard Business School and an entrepreneur.

== Awards ==
- 2015's Medal of Outstanding Achievement (Imperial College London, Royal Albert Hall)
- 2015's WISE Influence Award (Women in Science & Engineering)
- 2018's Woman of the Year award (everywoman in technology awards, London)
- 2020's Top 100 Women in tech, #TechWomen in London
- 2021's Emerging Leader Award (Imperial College London Alumni Association, London)
- 2021's 40 under 40 list (Greek America Foundation, New York)
