= Nike-Nike =

Nike Nike was the designation of a two to four stage American sounding rocket consisting of two Nike stages and optional upper stages. These include the Hercules M5E1, M6, and X-220 solid rocket engines, the NOTS 'HPAG' solid rocket engine, and the Thiokol T-40, T-55, and 1.5KS35000 solid rocket engines. Nike Nike had a payload capacity of 70kg to a 352 km altitude, and was used 19 times between 1956 and 1979.

Specifications:

- Diameter: 0.42m (1.37ft)
- Height: 11.90m (39.00ft)
- Span: 1.80m (5.90ft)
- Gross mass: 1,392kg (3,068 lb)
- Thrust: 217 kN (48,783 lbf)

== Launches ==
Launch Date	Mission	Agency	Launch Complex	Apogee
7 June 1956	E41 model test flight	NASA	Wallops Island	10 km
23 April 1959	Cree III 29-2	USAF	Eglin A-15	12 km
19 June 1959	Cree III 30-3	USAF	Eglin A-15	20 km
10 July 1959 - 12:45 GMT	Cree III 31-4	USAF	Eglin A-15	20km
2 September 1959	Cree III 32-5	USAF	Eglin A-15	23km
22 August 1960 - 17:06 GMT	Cree II unknown	USAF	Eglin	46 km
21 November 1960 - 17:00 GMT	Cree II unknown	USAF	Eglin	33 km
1966	SPTV-8 Para test	SAND	Tonopah	4 km
1966	SPTV-9 Para test	SAND	Tonopah	4 km
15 February 1967	Parachute test	Unknown	Tonopah	4 km
17 November 1967	Parachute test	Unknown	Tonopah	4 km
12 June 1968	Parachute test	Unknown	Tonopah	4 km
20 May 1978 - 09:29 GMT	SMOKE Aeronomy release mission	USAF GL	Wallops Island	53 km
22 May 1978 - 09:27 GMT	SMOKE Aeronomy release mission	USAF GL	Wallops Island	54 km
13 September 1978 - 00:53 GMT	SMOKE Aeronomy release mission	USAF GL	Fort Churchill	45 km
13 September 1978 - 11:13 GMT	SMOKE Aeronomy release mission	USAF GL	Fort Churchill	45 km
23 October 1979 - 23:04 GMT	SMOKE Aeronomy / Chemical release mission	USAF GL	Chilca	50 km
24 October 1979 - 23:24 GMT	SMOKE Aeronomy / Chemical release mission	USAF GL	Chilca	50 km
29 October 1979 - 23:04 GMT	SMOKE Aeronomy / Chemical release mission	USAF GL	Chilca	50 km
