= Marina Goudi =

Greek economist (1914–1986)

- Μαρίνα Γούδη
- Born: 1914; Athens, Greece
- Died: 1986 (aged 71–72)

Academic background
- Education: University of Athens (PhD, 1947); Harvard University (MA)
- Doctoral advisor: Xenophon Zolotas

Academic work
- Discipline: Monetary economics, Economic theory
- School or tradition: Neoclassical economics
- Institutions: Bank of Greece; University of Athens

Marina Goudi (1914–1986) was a Greek economist, described by sociologist Adamantios Syrmaloglou as "the first academic woman economist in Greece". An economist at the Bank of Greece from 1945 to 1970 and adviser to its governors Kyriakos Varvaressos and Xenophon Zolotas, she edited the Review of Political and Economic Sciences from 1946 to 1967, taught political economy in the law school of the University of Athens from 1954, where she was elected as a professor in 1970.

== Selected works ==
- "Keynes's General Theory as an explanation of the economic cycle". Review of Political and Economic Sciences (in Greek). 1: 205–223. 1946.
- "Indifference curve analysis according to J. R. Hicks". Review of Political and Economic Sciences (in Greek). 2: 297–333. 1947.
- Observations on the Problem of Exports after the Readjustment [of the Exchange Rate]. Athens. 1950.
- The Readjustment of the Price of Foreign Exchange (in Greek). Athens. 1953.
- On Money (in Greek). Athens: Sakkoulas. 1967.
