= Evi Touloupa =

Greek archaeologist and art historian (1924–2021)

- Born: Paraskevi Stasinopoulou; July 8, 1924; Athens, Greece
- Died: October 10, 2021 (aged 97)
- Occupations: Archaeologist and curator

Academic background
- Education: University of Athens, University of Ioannina

Academic work
- Discipline: Greek Archaeology

Paraskevi "Evi" Touloupa (née Stasinopoulou; Greek Έβη (Παρασκευή) Στασινοπούλου-Τουλούπα; 8 July 1924 - 10 October 2021) was a Greek archaeologist and Curator of Antiquities of the Acropolis.

== Early life and education ==
Evi Stasinopoulou-Touloupa was born in Athens on July 8, 1924; her full first name was Paraskevi, abbreviated to Evi by her mother. She attended primary school in the neighbourhood of Kypseli, where she lived with her parents, and then attended the German School of Athens from 1936 to 1942: her father, an optician, chose this school because he travelled to Germany for work. She recalled later how, during the occupation of Greece in World War II, her father tried to withdraw her from the school to attend the free public school instead, but the director insisted that she continue to attend the German school for free. After high school, she enrolled in university but could not immediately attend due to the closure of universities during the war; instead she worked in the school's kindergarten and organised food handouts. She then studied archaeology at the University of Athens, choosing this course due to inspiration by lecturers such as Spyridon Marinatos. After her studies, she began working in 1950 as a teacher in the private 'Athinaion' school, as women were not allowed in the Greek Archaeological Service at this period. She then attended the Pontifico Istituto di Archaeologia Christiana in Rome for postgraduate study from 1953 to 1954, thanks to an Italian scholarship.

== Career ==
Touloupa's first archaeological job, which she began in 1955 after the removal of the prohibition of women working in the Archaeological Service, was as a research associate in the National Archaeological Museum, Athens, where she worked unpacking and cataloguing antiquities which had been crated up and in some cases even buried for protection during World War II. She was given this job by curator Semni Karouzou, who noticed that she was an enthusiastic regular attendee of archaeological lectures, and, worked first of all with Agni Sakellariou in the prehistoric collection and later with Karouzou and her husband Christos on the bronze collection. She later recalled her excitement at encountering real ancient artefacts for the first time after studying them at university: “I was so excited because throughout my time at university the museums were closed and what we learned was purely theoretical. I couldn’t wait to touch the ancient objects”. She also described the conditions she found while unpacking crates: “The vessels were wrapped in cotton and paper, which we were surprised to see often had blood drops on them. ‘It’s from the rats,’ my assistant Stavros told me."; "I remember that the Charioteer of Delphi had come to Athens to be hidden, and it was in two pieces, and we saw it for the first time". In the 1960s and 70s, she held a range of positions in various archaeological Ephorates and museums around Greece, serving as a curator in the Ephorate of the Ionian Islands, Corfu (1960–63); head of the prefectures of Boeotia and Phthiotis, based in Thebes (1963–65); curator of the National Archaeological Museum's bronze collection (1965-1973); head of the Ephorate of Epirus (1973–75), where she was sent by the military Junta; in the Archaeological Museum of Eleusis and the Ministry of Culture and Sports (1975); and head of the Ephorate of Euboea (1976–79).

Notable archaeological work undertaken by Touloupa during this period included the excavation of the Mycenaean 'Palace of Kadmos' in Thebes, alongside the organisation of the Archaeological Museum of Thebes, and, while in Euboea, the excavation and preservation of the Tomb and the "Heroon" at Lefkandi, on which she collaborated with the British School at Athens.

In 1979, Touloupa became a fellow of the German Archaeological Institute in Berlin, studying the sculpture of the temple of Apollo Daphnephoros in Eretria, which then formed the subject of her PhD dissertation at the University of Ioannina, awarded in 1982. In the same year, Touloupa was director of the Athens Ephorate of Prehistoric and Classical Antiquities by Greek Minister of Culture Melina Mercouri, a position she held until 1990, during which time she oversaw work on the restoration of the Acropolis, the creation of the Centre for the Study of the Acropolis in the restored Weiler Building, and the foundation of the Acropolis Friends Association, of which she became the honorary president. After her retirement in 1989, she remained involved in the Council of the Acropolis Monuments Preservation Committee and the Council of the Organisation for the Construction of the New Acropolis Museum.

In 1991–2, Touloupa received a Fulbright Scholarship to visit Princeton University in order to work on the late archaic temple pediments from Karthaia on the island of Kea.

From 1990 to 2000, Touloupa wrote columns for the newspaper 'Ta Nea', which were collected in the books "From Pnyx to Pagrati" (2004) and "Past but not forgotten" (2008).

== Personal life ==
In 1962, Touloupa married Dimitrios Touloupas, a lawyer and politician. The couple were arrested in 1969, during the period of the Greek military Junta; Evi was released after ten days, while Dimitrios was exiled from Athens, first to Thesprotia in north-western Greece and then to the Peloponnese, and then sent to prison without a trial; in an interview, she described the difficulties of travelling to see him after work on a weekend to bring him food, clothes, and books, and of life under the Junta in general. Dimitrios died in a car accident in 1978.

== Legacy ==
Touloupa died aged 97 on October 10, 2021, The Greek Minister of Culture and Sports, Lina Mendoni, praised her for her work "protecting and highlighting our cultural treasure, and supporting new, innovative and pioneering ideas, actions and projects for the times", and stated that she "linked her name with the history of Greek archaeology in the last decades of the 20th century". An obituary in the Greek newspaper Kathimerini described her as "the great lady of archaeology... a truly heroic figure of the Greek 20th century".

== Publications ==
=== Selected academic publications ===
Τouloupa, Evi. "Bericht über die neuen Ausgrabungen in Theben (Report on the new excavations in Thebes)", Kadmos 3.1 (1964): 25–27.

Touloupa, Evi. "Une Gorgone en bronze de l'Acropole (A bronze Gorgon from the Acropolis)", Bulletin de Correspondance Hellénique 93.2 (1969): 862–884.

Popham, Mervyn, Evi Touloupa, and L. Hugh Sackett. "The hero of Lefkandi", Antiquity 56.218 (1982): 169–174.

Vlassopoulou, Christina, and Evi Touloupa. "Decorated Architectural Terracottas from the Athenian Acropolis: Catalogue of Exhibition", Hesperia: The Journal of the American School of Classical Studies at Athens 59.1 (1990): i-xxxi.

Touloupa, Evi. "RECHERCHES ARCHÉOLOGIQUES SUR L'ACROPOLE: BILAN DES CINQ DERNIÈRES ANNÉES (Archaeological research on the Acropolis: review of the last five years)", Revue Archéologique Fasc. 1 (1991): 210–218.

Touloupa, Evi. "RÉFLEXIONS SUR LES ANASTYLOSES EN COURS A L'ACROPOLE D'ATHÈNES (Reflections on the restoration in progress on the Acropolis of Athens)", Revue Archéologique (1994): 243–252.

Touloupa, Evi. Τα εναέτια γλυπτά του ναού του Απόλλωνος Δαφνηφόρου στην Ερέτρια (The pediment statues of the temple of Apollo Daphnephoros in Eretria). Archaeological Society of Athens (2002).

=== Collections of newspaper articles ===
Από την Πνύκα στο Παγκράτι (From the Pnyx to Pagrati), Acropolis Friends Association, Athens (2004).

Περασμένα και όχι ξεχασμένα (Past but not forgotten). Oceanida publications, Athens (2008).

=== Memoirs ===
Η ζωή στην Κέρκυρα, 1961-1962 (Life in Corfu, 1961-1962). Archive Publications (2014).
