= Xenophon Zolotas =

Greek economist (1904–2004)

- Ξενοφών Ζολώτας
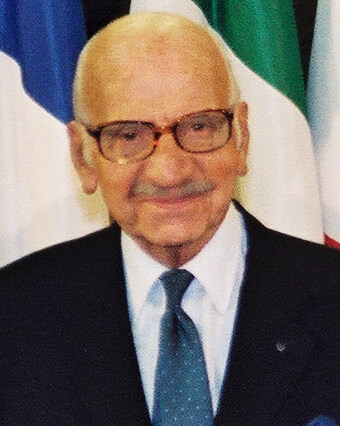
- Zolotas in 1989

Prime Minister of Greece
- In office 23 November 1989 – 11 April 1990
- President: Christos Sartzetakis
- Preceded by: Ioannis Grivas (caretaker)
- Succeeded by: Konstantinos Mitsotakis

Governor of the Bank of Greece
- In office 27 November 1974 – 29 October 1981
- Preceded by: Panagotis Papaligouras
- Succeeded by: Gerasimos Arsenis
- In office 5 February 1955 – 5 August 1967
- Preceded by: Georgios Mantzavinos
- Succeeded by: Dimitrios N. Galanis
- In office 12 October 1944 – 8 January 1945
- Preceded by: Theodoros Tourkovasilis
- Succeeded by: Kyriakos Varvaresos

Personal details
- Born: 26 March 1904 Athens, Kingdom of Greece
- Died: 10 June 2004 (aged 100) Dionysiou Areopagitou Street, Makrygianni, Athens, Greece
- Party: Independent
- Spouse: Lola Ritsou (m. 1958)
- Education: University of Athens; Leipzig University; University of Paris

Xenophon Zolotas (Greek: Ξενοφών Ζολώτας; 26 March 1904 – 10 June 2004) was a Greek economist who served as an interim non-party Prime Minister of Greece.

== Life and career ==
Xenophon Zolotas was born on 26 March 1904 in Athens to a family of goldsmiths with roots in Russia. He graduated from Rizarios Ecclesiastical School. Zolotas studied law at the University of Athens, and later studied at the Leipzig University and the University of Paris. In 1928, he became a professor of economics at the University of Athens and at Aristotle University of Thessaloniki. He held these posts until 1968, when he resigned in protest of the military regime which had come to power in 1967.

Zolotas was director of the Bank of Greece from 1944–1945, 1955–1967 (when he resigned in protest at the regime), and 1974–1981. He was also a member of the Board of Directors of UNRRA in 1946, and held senior posts in the International Monetary Fund and other international organisations from 1946 to 1981. Zolotas published many works on Greek and international economic topics. He was a Keynesian, and was active in socialist circles with his close friend, Professor Angelos Angelopoulos.

In association with his work in international economics, he gave two speeches at the International Bank for Reconstruction and Development, which, in his words, "[used] with the exception of articles and prepositions only Greek words", to demonstrate the contribution of Greek to the English vocabulary.

When the elections of November 1989 failed to give a majority to either the PASOK party of Andreas Papandreou or the New Democracy party of Konstantinos Mitsotakis, Zolotas, then aged 85, agreed to become Prime Minister at head of a non-party administration until fresh elections could be held. He stepped down after the election of April 1990 which gave Mitsotakis a narrow majority.

His book Economic Growth and Declining Social Welfare advances the idea that in modern economic growth, there is an increasing output of useless and even discomforting things, such as advertising. For that reason, he posits modern economic growth does not create conditions for further human happiness, a thesis in agreement with ideas by Richard Easterlin and Herman Daly.

Zolotas married the American-born Greek socialite Callirhoe "Lola" Ritsou (1923 – 17 February 2016) in 1958 in Lausanne.

Zolotas died of multiple organ failure at his home at Dionysiou Areopagitou 25 in the Makrygianni neighbourhood of Athens, on 10 June 2004, at age 100. He is buried at the First Cemetery of Athens.

== See also ==
- List of prime ministers of Greece

Government offices
| Preceded by Theodoros Tourkovasilis | Governor of the Bank of Greece; 1944–1945 | Succeeded by Kyriakos Varvaresos |
| Preceded by Giorgios Mantzavinos | Governor of the Bank of Greece; 1955–1967 | Succeeded by Dimitrios N. Gelanis |
| Preceded by Panagotis Papaligouras | Governor of the Bank of Greece; 1974–1981 | Succeeded by Gerasimos Arsenis |
Political offices
| Preceded by Ioannis Grivas | Prime Minister of Greece; 1989–1990 | Succeeded by Konstantinos Mitsotakis |
