= Dionysiou Areopagitou Street =

Street in Athens, Greece

Coordinates: 37°58′10.95″N 23°43′35.12″E

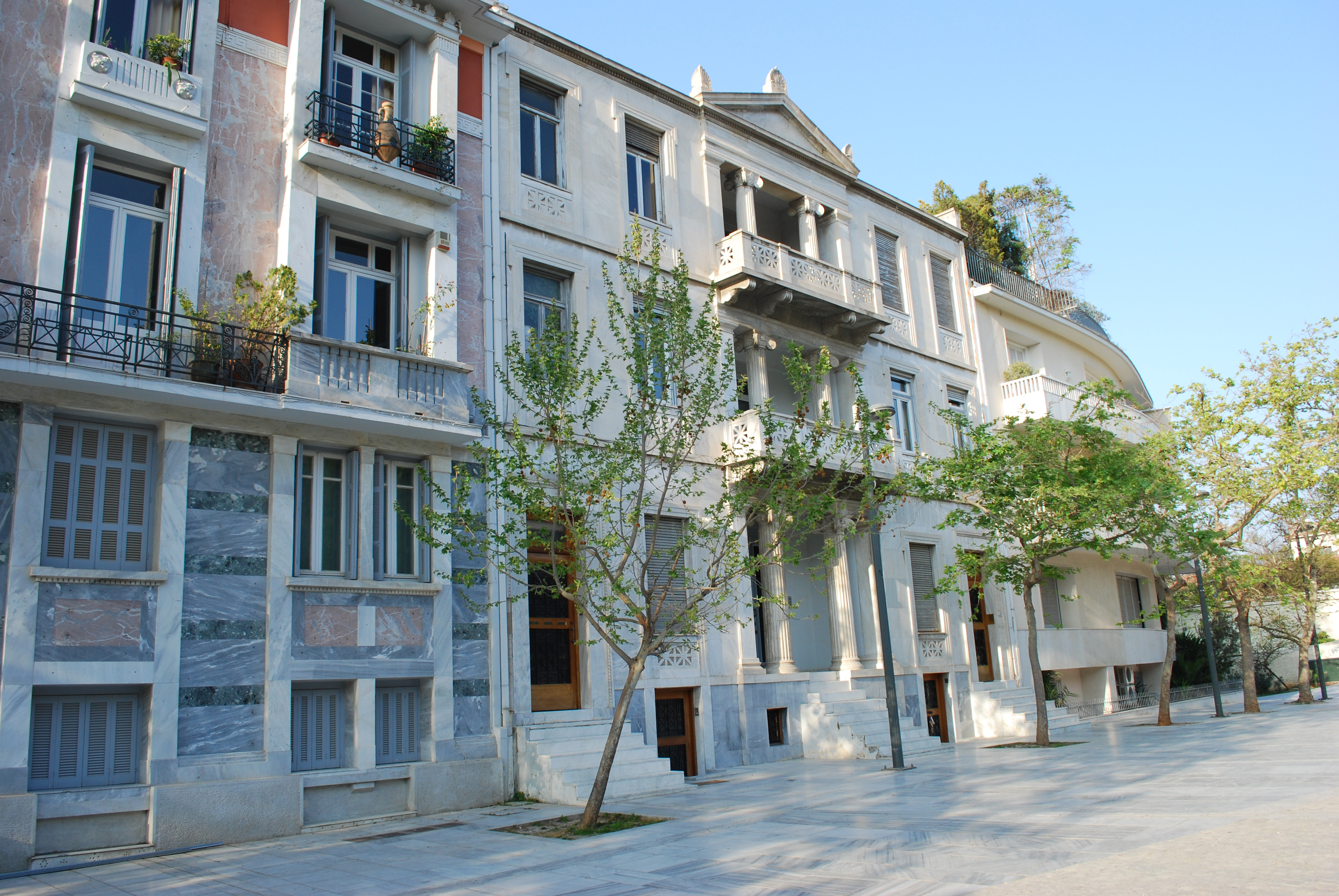
View of the street

Dionysiou Areopagitou Street (Greek: Οδός Διονυσίου Αρεοπαγίτου, pronounced [oˈðoz ðʝoniˈsi.u areopaˈʝitu]) is a pedestrianized street, adjacent to the south slope of the Acropolis in the Makrygianni district of Athens. It is named after Dionysius the Areopagite, the first Athenian convert to Christianity after Apostle Paul's sermon, according to the Acts of the Apostles, and patron saint of the city of Athens.

The street runs from east to west. It starts from Amalias Avenue near the Arch of Hadrian and ends near Philopappos Hill where it continues as Apostolou Pavlou Avenue, the rest of the pedestrian zone which goes around the archaeological site of the Acropolis and the Agora.

The street was first mapped in 1857 in a position more northern than where it is located today, adjacently to the Odeon of Herodes Atticus. It acquired its current shape in 1955, when it was redesigned by architect Dimitris Pikionis, who also designed the paved paths of the archaeological site. The street was finally pedestrianized in 2003.

== Buildings and monuments ==
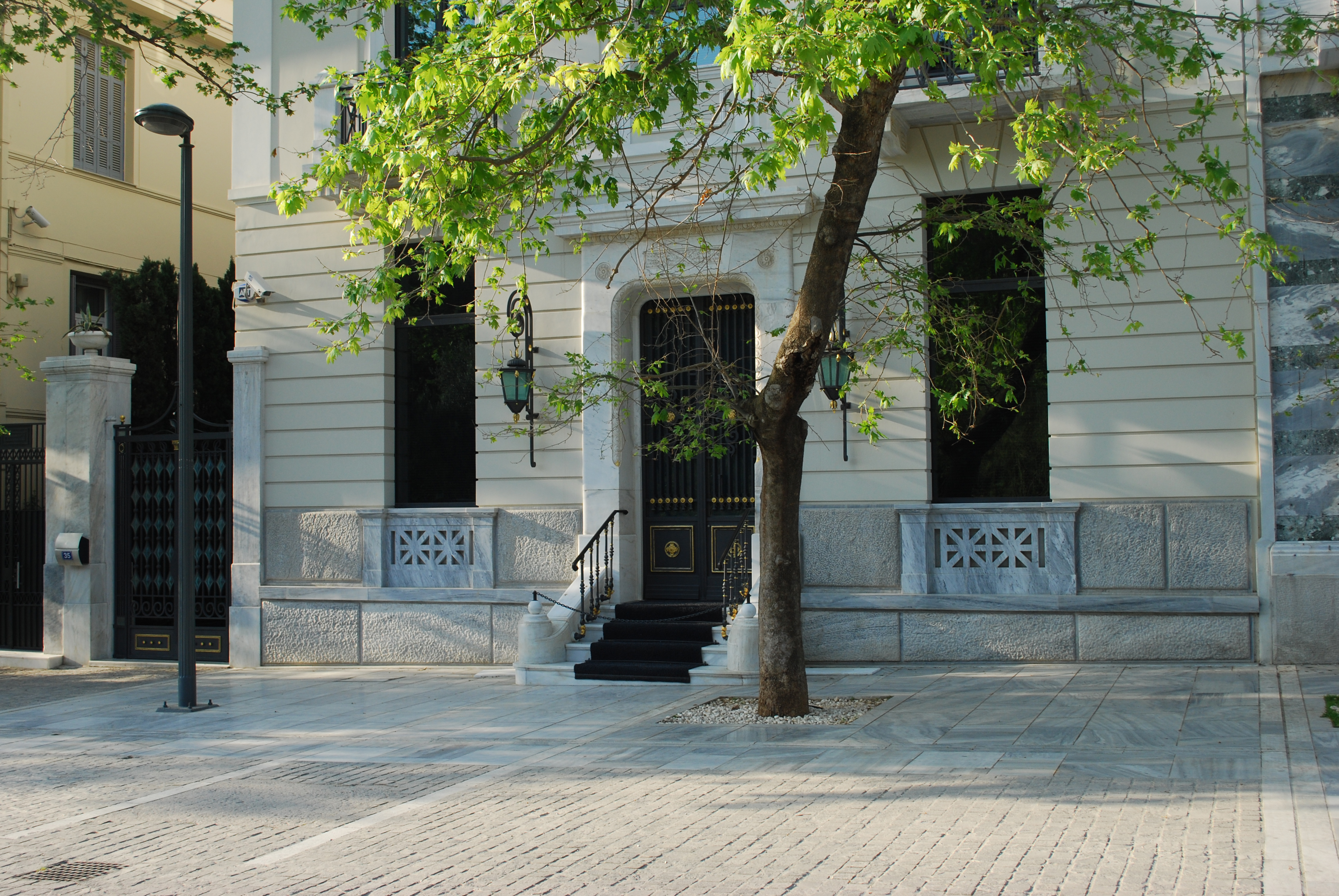
An early 20th-century mansion with Art Nouveau and Eclecticist elements on Dionysiou Areopagitou Street.

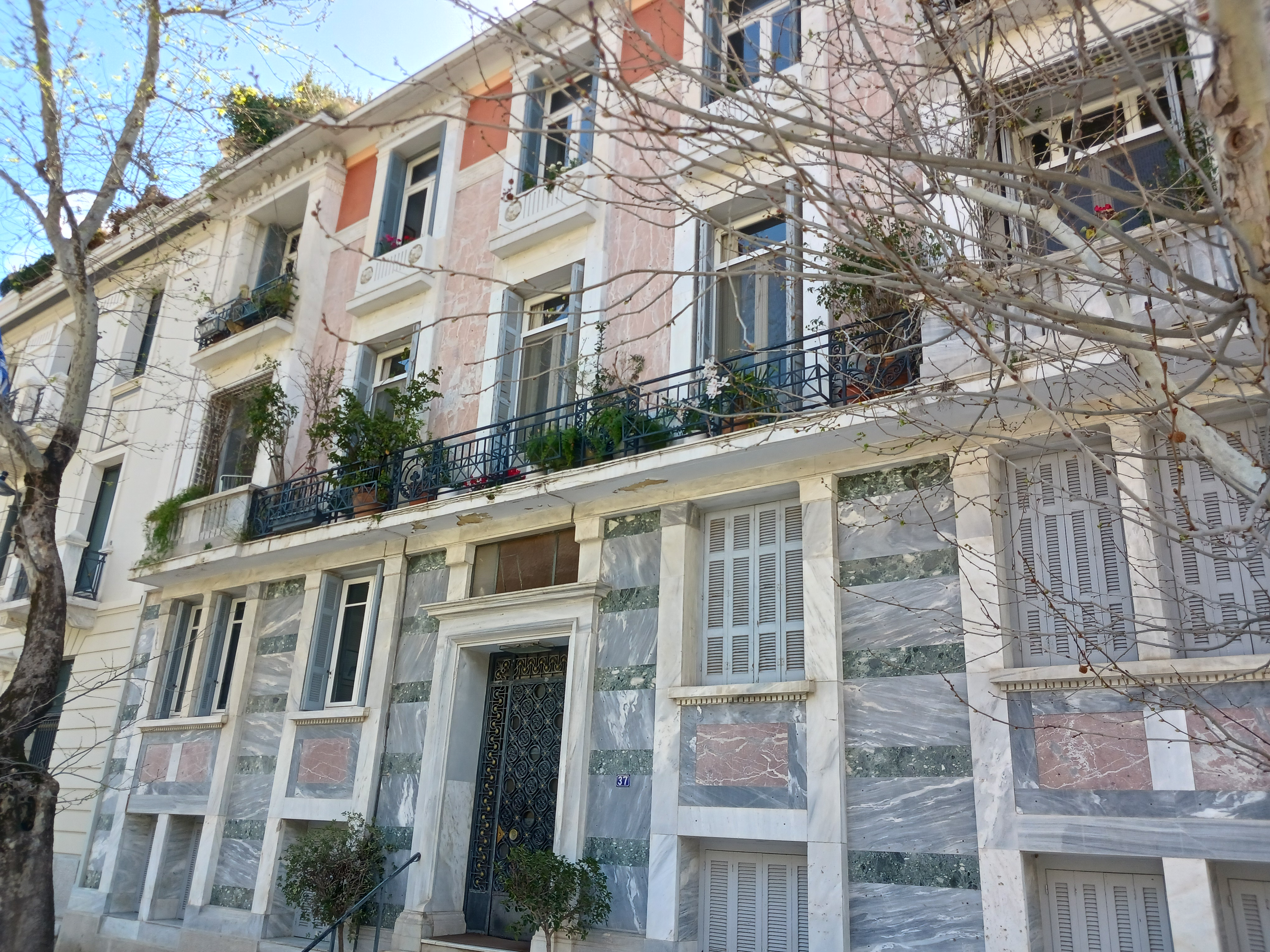
Early 20th-century building designed by Vasileios Kouremenos.

The apartment building of Xenophon Zolotas, built in 1960 by architect Emmanouil Vourekas.

The beginning of the street, near Amalias Avenue, has buildings on both sides. However, after Makrygianni Street, buildings cease on the north side and give place to the archaeological site of the Acropolis. Near Makrygianni Street is the entrance to the ancient Theatre of Dionysus. On the south side is the Acropolis Museum and an upmarket residential district with apartment buildings and houses. Near the end is the entrance to the Odeon of Herodes Atticus. In the middle of the street were found the foundations of the house of Proclus.

== Notable residents ==
- Vangelis Papathanasiou, composer. He owned a neoclassical mansion near the Acropolis Museum which was threatened to be demolished during the construction of the museum.
- Konstantinos Parthenis, painter. His house was demolished after his death in 1967.
- Akis Tsochatzopoulos, politician. His expensive apartment which he bought using money from economic scandals has caused a stir.
- Xenophon Zolotas, economist and interim prime minister of Greece.
