= Makrygianni, Athens =

Makrygianni Μακρυγιάννη
- Neighborhood
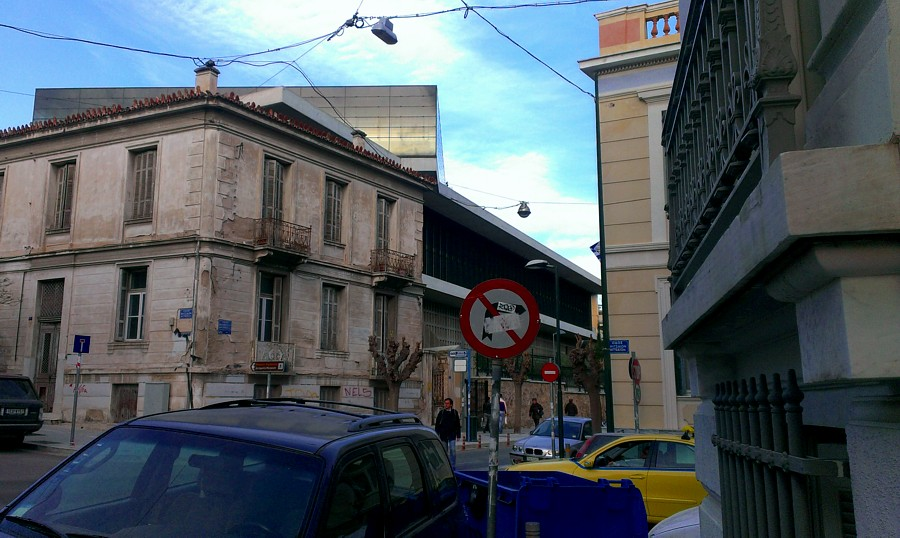
- Makrygianni district

- Location within Athens municipality
- Coordinates: 37°57′59″N 23°43′45″E
- Country: Greece
- Region: Attica
- City: Athens
- Website: www.cityofathens.gr

Makrygianni or Makriyanni (Greek: Μακρυγιάννη, pronounced [makriˈʝani]) is a neighborhood of Athens, Greece. Also known as Acropolis, it is located in the south side of Acropolis and bounded between the avenues Dionysiou Areopagitou and Syngrou. The district is named after Ioannis Makrygiannis, Greek general of the Greek War of Independence, who used to own a house and fields in the area. Opposite the house of Ioannis Makrygiannis a military hospital was built – known as Weiler Building after the architect who designed it. This building was later used as gendarmerie headquarters and a violent battle took place there during the Dekemvriana, in 1944. In the Makrygianni neighbourhood is located the new Acropolis Museum that was inaugurated in 2009.

== See also ==
- Museum of the Center for the Acropolis Studies
