= Landscaping of the Acropolis of Athens =

Pathway and architectural interventions by Dimitris Pikionis

The landscaping of the Acropolis of Athens includes a system of paths and architectural interventions designed by Dimitris Pikionis, an architect and teacher at the School of Architecture at the National Technical University of Athens, in participation with his students, from 1954 to 1957.

The project consists of a network of footpaths that provide access to the Odeon of Herodes Atticus, the Acropolis of Athens and the Philopappos Hill from Dionysiou Areopagitou Street and Apostolou Pavlou Street. It included the renovation of the chapel of Saint Demetrios Loumbardiaris and its churchyard.

== General idea ==
The general idea of the plan was laid out in marking the paths and selecting a series of points related to orientation and views. This was done by Pikionis's intuition. Pikionis wanted to provide a sequence of emotions such as surprise, admiration and curiosity to the visitor before he could reach the Acropolis or Philopappos Hill. Classical and traditional architecture as well as Japanese influences were merged and created a contemporary design that embraces and idealizes Greek tradition.

== Materials ==
Pikionis collected marble and clay shards left over from the demolished buildings of nineteenth-century Athens and composed them into a collage in the paths. These pieces were put together with new marble stones and concrete elements into ornaments and fragments referring to the past and based on traditional elements. All patterns and shapes of paving, gutters, steps and seats merge naturally into an art piece.

== Improvised construction ==
The project was done with Pikionis's intuition and aesthetic sensibility about the site. A general idea was laid out; however, the design was never specified in detail. Everything was adapted in situ during the construction which was carried out by small construction teams that Pikionis supervised and guided through suggestions, examples and dialogue. He said: "The common architectural supervision would be totally inadequate and the architect should build the work himself through the hands of his craftsmen." By supporting craftsmen's creativity he achieved a perfect result between his guidance and the workers' execution: "Try it as you know; you have your own way. I only gave an idea. I am sure you can set it up better." His thinking is in a way close to Le Corbusier's during his brutalism period, when he considered incidental imperfection done by workers a beautiful part of the finished project.

== Criticism ==
As Pikionis relied solely on his intuition and artistic sensitivity and not on any historical or archeological research during the project, he was criticized after the completion of the project. For Pikionis's defense professor Charalambos Bouras said: "Pikionis approaches the ancients by deviating from history. He is to establish his personal relationship with the object".

== See also ==
- Modern architecture in Athens
