= Three-Bodied Daemon (ACMA 35) =

Ancient Greek sculpture

- Τρισώματος Δαίμων (Greek)
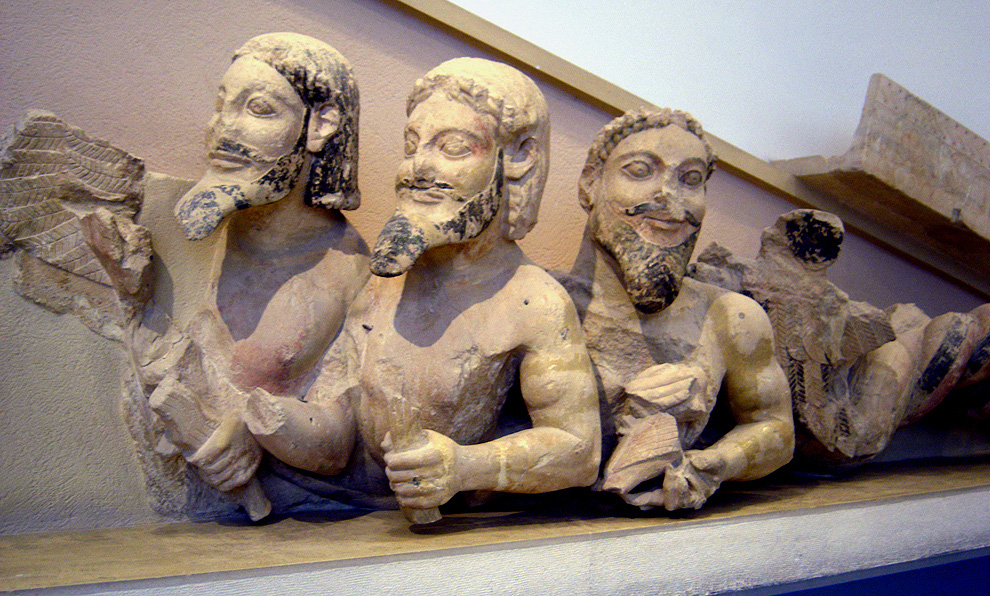
- The pediment in the ACMA
- Year: 570 BC
- Catalogue: No 35
- Medium: Limestone
- Movement: Early archaic
- Subject: Typhon or Nereus
- Dimensions: 76 cm × 323 cm (30 in × 127 in)
- Condition: Large fragments
- Location: Acropolis Museum, Athens
- Owner: Greece

The Three-Bodied Daemon (Greek: Τρισώματος Δαίμων) or the Three-Bodied Monster is an ancient Greek sculpture in typical early Archaic period style, once part of the west pediment of the Hekatompedon temple in the Acropolis of Athens. Today it is housed in the Acropolis Museum in Athens, Greece. It is made of limestone, and it is remarkable for the large amount of colour pigment on it that has survived.

== History ==
This sculpture, along with two more groups (one of Heracles fighting the sea-god Triton, and one of lions devouring a bull), was part of the decoration of one of the two pediments of the Hekatompedon, most likely the western one, and was created around 570 BC, during the early Archaic period. Most fragments were found in 1888 to the east and southeast of the Parthenon, and were welded and restored with plaster.

== Description ==
The sculpture depicts a large, male figure with three naked bodies. All three bodies are bearded, and seem to share a single, large tail. To their right a figure, their opponent, survives. The three bearded figures hold items in their hands that can be assigned to each of the four elements; a lightning bolt (fire), waves (water) and a bird (air), while their long, swirling tail symbolizes the earth, though no further conclusion can be achieved. The objects are all held in their left hands; out of the three right hands, only one survives, and it does not seem to be holding anything. The item is made of a sort of porous limestone (porolithus), and measures 3,35 m. in length and 79 cm in height.

All sculptures of the Hekatompedon pediments are excellent examples of coloured ancient Greek sculptures which have retained some if not most of their painting over the centuries, as the bright decoration has survived on the limestone, unlike the paint on the marble pediments of the Parthenon.

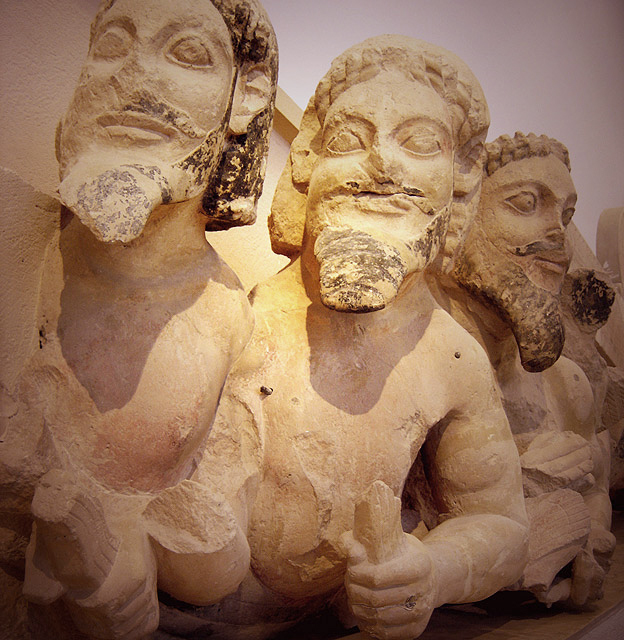
The three bodies in line

The first head and body of Typhon has many traces of the red color which was used to paint his flesh, particularly visible on the chest. The areola is brown, while his hair and beard are red-black. The eyelids have black rings, indicating the eyelashes, likewise the eyebrows are also black. The two large and shallow round cavities that make up his eyes are red, with light green irises. The second boy's skin is likewise reddish, with colour remaining on the chest and left halve of the face. The beard is again reddish black, but now no trace of colour survives on his hair. Eyelids and eyebrows are also black, but the paint has faded off the irises. The third body is more or less the same.

In second middle body we see a very red color of the flesh, especially on the chest and on the left half of the face. Deep blue was again saved in the beard, but no trace of it in the crown. Eyelids and eyebrows are black again, but the pupil is no longer distinguishable. In the third body no color can be distinguished, and the numerous remains per head are enumerated in the vicinity. The visible form of this wing is, on the upper part, smooth and of a dark blue color, on the lower part, lines are incised, i.e., the wings, which seem to have been alternately colored and uncolored, so that either one row showed red or the other black-green coloring, so that probably as often observed arose afterwards from the blue. The serpentine form's tail show a red band running along the length of it between two black-blue ones, with one in the natural color of the stone.

== Restoration ==
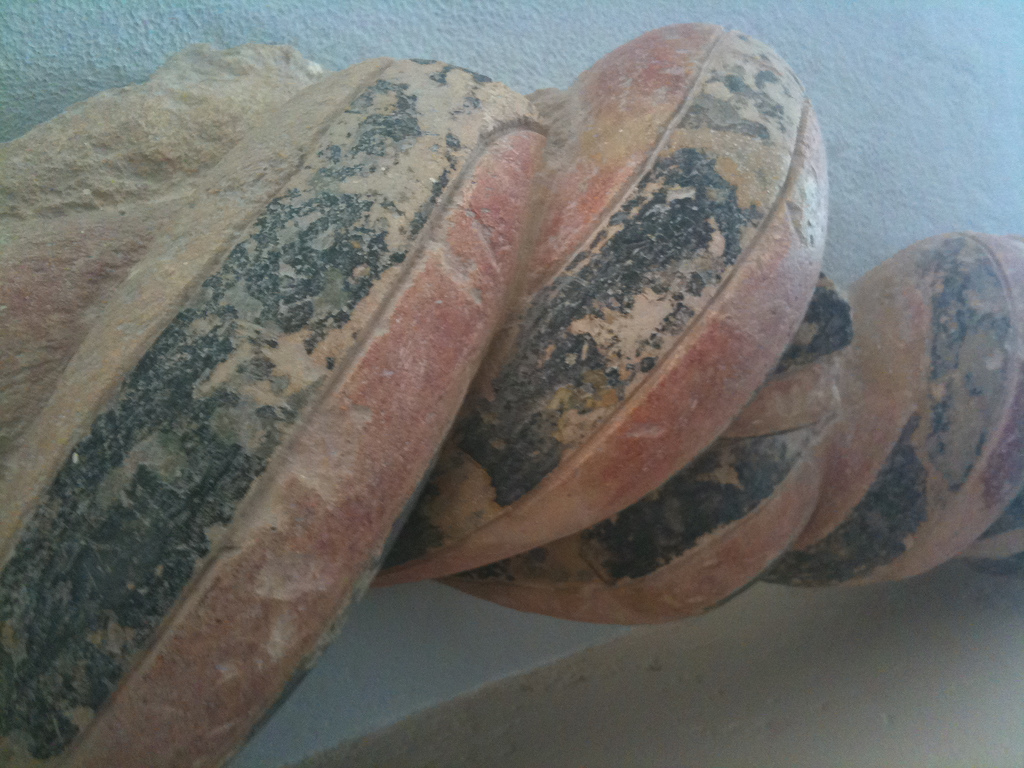
Detail from the monster's tail

The first two human heads of Typhon from the left are not carved from the same piece of limestone as the rest of the massive body but from other pieces. His third head was similarly inlaid, but because the upper part of the body was destroyed and filled in with plaster, it is unclear whether the head belongs to this body or to different but similar one. Other parts were similarly added, like part of the right wing, for the fastening of which three holes were opened in a line, or the forearm of the Zeus figure, so that now it has a smooth cross-sectional surface, but without holes with infused lead. To fix them, holes (as seen in the arm and shoulders of the monster) were made, 6-7 millimeters wide, in order to preserve the lead. Two of them, certainly belonging to this group, are located on the right forearm of the middle body.

== Identity of the man ==
It is not clear which mythological character the sculpture represents. It has been suggested that it could be the shapeshifting sea-god Nereus, or the serpentine monster Typhon, who once attacked the Olympians. If it is Typhon, then the red-clad figure to his right must be Zeus, the god who defeated him. It was assumed to be Typhon due to the analogy with a red-figure base, but as it has been pointed out, the vase depicts a single-bodied individual, and his benignant expression has no parallel with the battle scene depicted on the vase. The Athenian playwright Euripides in his tragedy Heracles does however describe Typhon as having three bodies.

Furtwangler suggested that the figure is supposed to be the Tritopatores, whom he took to be benevolent wind deities connected to childbirth, based on the tri- ("three") prefix of their name. However there is no evidence that the Tritopatores were depicted as three bodies with a single tail, and were rather three separate beings.

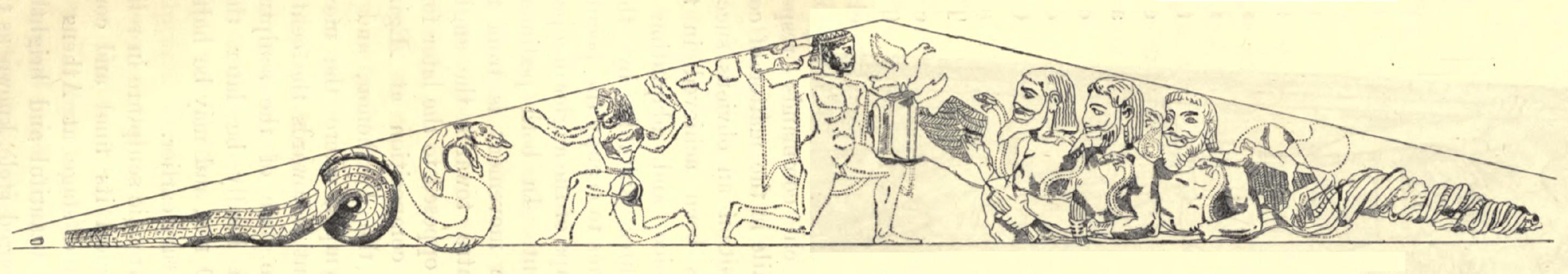
The daemon's position in the pediment

== See also ==
- Nike Fixing her Sandal
- Moschophoros
- Nike of Callimachus

== Bibliography ==
- Archaeological Society of Athens (1906). Μνημεία της Ελλάδος [Monuments of Greece] (in Greek). Athens: Π. Δ. Σακελλαρίου.
- Dickins, Guy (1912). Catalogue of The Acropolis Museum. Vol. I: Archaic Sculpture. Cambridge University Press.
- Euripides, Heracles in The Complete Greek Drama, edited by Whitney J. Oates and Eugene O'Neill, Jr. in two volumes. 1. Heracles, translated by E. P. Coleridge. New York. Random House. 1938. Online version at the Perseus Digital Library.
- Kastriotis, Panagiotis (1895). Κατάλογος του Μουσείου της Ακροπόλεως [Catalogue of the Museum of the Acropolis] (in Greek). Athens: Ν. Γ. Ιγγλέση.
- Titi, Catharine (2023). The Parthenon Marbles and International Law. Paris, France: Springer. ISBN 978-3-031-26356-9.
- Trianti, Ismene (1998). Το Μουσείο Ακροπόλεως [The Acropolis Museum] (PDF) (in Greek). Athens, Greece: OLKOS publications. ISBN 960-7169-84-0.
