= Tritopatores =

Household deities in Ancient Athens

- Gods of wind, marriage and childbirth
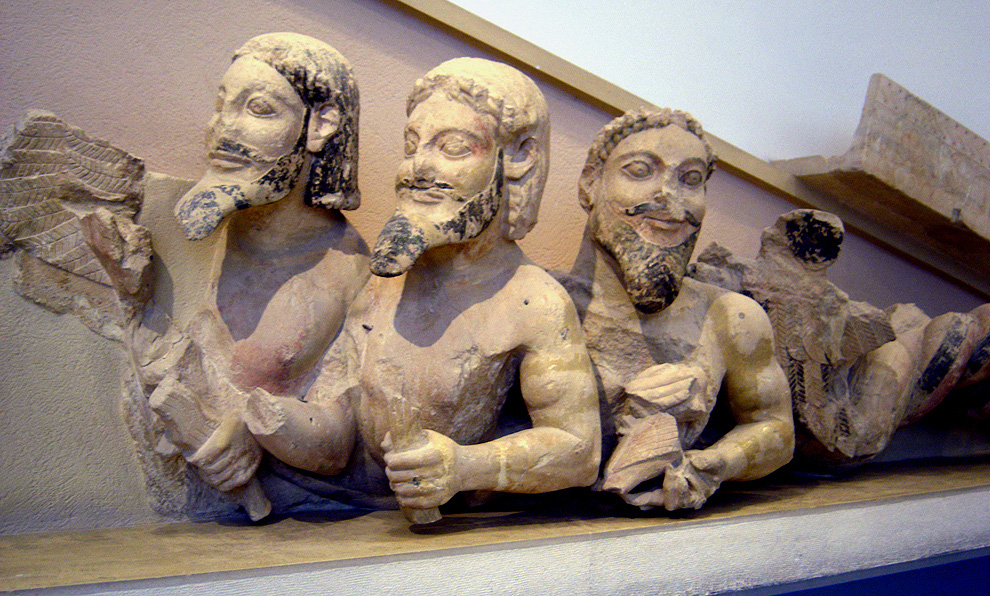
- The figure sometimes identified as the Tritopatores
- Major cult center: Attica, Delos
- Abode: Sky, earth

Genealogy
- Parents: Helios (father); Gaia (mother)
- Siblings: Various maternal and paternal half-siblings

In ancient Greek religion and mythology, the Tritopatores (Ancient Greek: Τριτοπάτορες, romanized: Tritopátores, lit. 'thrice-ancestors') are three benevolent wind gods worshipped in Athens as deities of marriage, childbirth and the household. They are mentioned in the Suda lexicon, a Byzantine work of the tenth century AD, and several other Greek inscriptions.

== Mythology ==
The Tritopatores are mentioned in the tenth-century Byzantine lexicon known as the Suda, whose author states that they are Athenian wind gods (or guardians of the winds) to whom the Athenians pray and offer sacrifices when they are about to marry or wish to conceive children. He says that some authors make them the firstborn beings of them all, while others make them the offspring of the earth-goddess Gaia by the sun-god Helios (often identified with Apollo). He gives their names as Amalceides, Protocles and Protocleon (in Ancient Greek: Ἀμαλκείδης, Πρωτοκλῆς and Πρωτοκλέων), but also says that alternatively they are Cottus, Briareon and Gyges (mixing them up with the Hecatoncheires, a set of offspring of Gaia by the sky-god Uranus).

== Worship ==
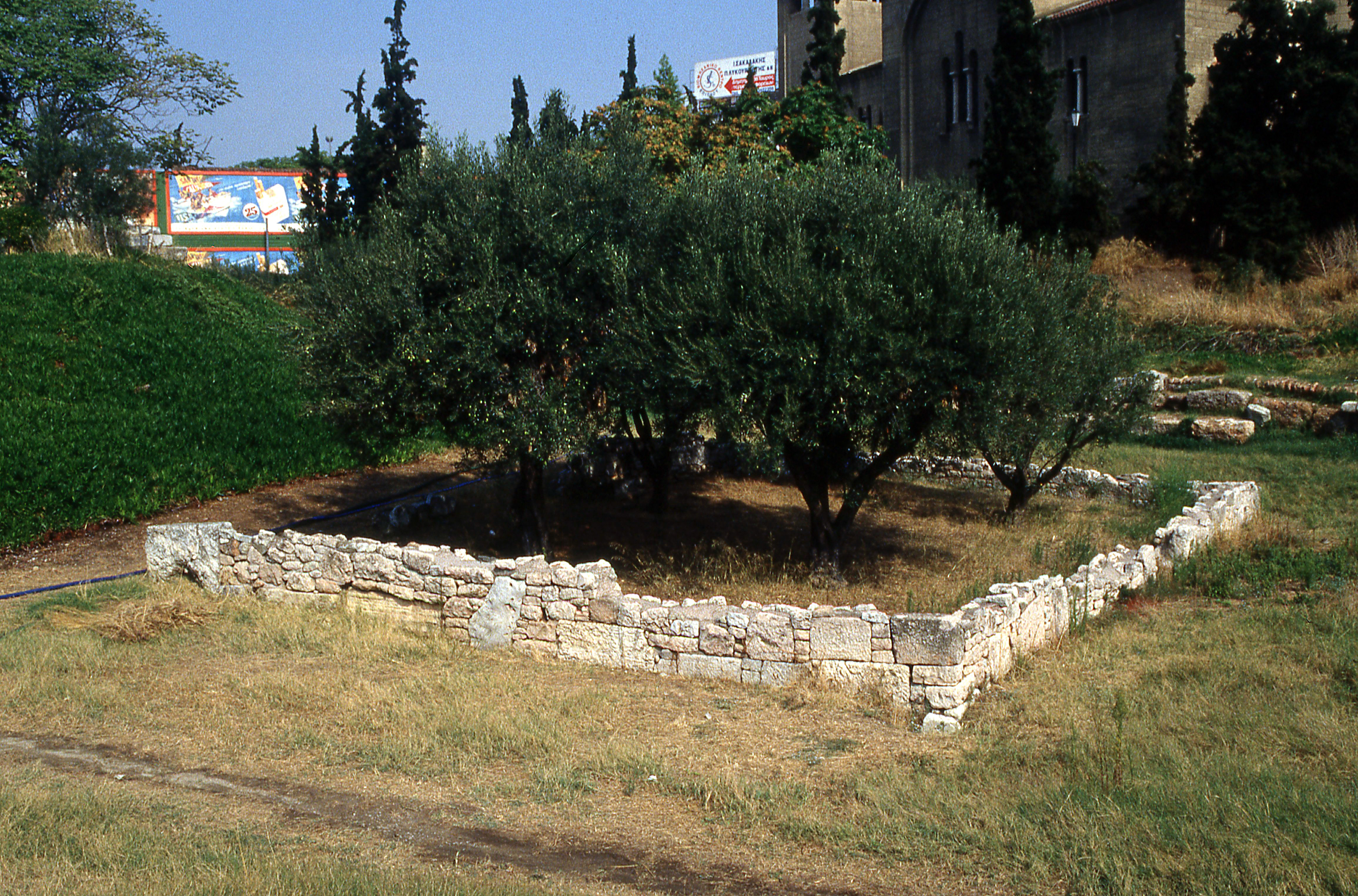
The Tritopatreion (sanctuary of the Tritopatores) in the Kerameikos, Athens

The Tritopatores' worship was a type of the ancestor-worshipping cult of a particular group, in this case the Athenians. Cults and festivals in honour of the three are attested in the wider Attica region and the Athens-influenced Delos, Selinus, Troezen and Cyrene. Furtwangler suggested that the three-bodied figure from the pediment of the Hekatompedon in the Acropolis of Athens is supposed to depict the Tritopatores, based on the tri- ("three") prefix of their name; that being said, there is no evidence that the Tritopatores were ever thought to be three bodies with a single tail, as they are three separate beings.

== See also ==
- Eileithyia, goddess of childbirth
- Hera, goddess of marriage and household
- Hestia, goddess of the hearth

== Bibliography ==
- Dickins, Guy (1912). Catalogue of The Acropolis Museum. Vol. I: Archaic Sculpture. Cambridge University Press.
