= Acropolis Museum =

Archaeological museum in Athens, Greece

- Μουσείο Ακρόπολης

- The Acropolis Museum as seen from the top of the Acropolis of Athens
- Interactive fullscreen map
- Established: 20 June 2009
- Location: Dionysiou Areopagitou Street; Athens, Greece
- Coordinates: 37.969108°N 23.728299°E
- Type: Archaeological Museum
- Collection size: 4,250+ objects
- Visitors: 2,000,312 (2024)
- Owner: Hellenic Ministry of Culture and Tourism
- Public transit access: Akropoli
- Website: theacropolismuseum.gr

The Acropolis Museum (Greek: Μουσείο Ακρόπολης, Mouseio Akropolis) is an archaeological museum focused on the findings of the archaeological site of the Acropolis of Athens. The museum was built to house artifacts from the Greek Bronze Age to Roman and Byzantine Greece. The Acropolis Museum also lies over the ruins of part of Roman and early Byzantine Athens.

The museum was founded in 2003, while the Organization of the Museum was established in 2008. It opened to the public on 20 June 2009. More than 4,250 objects are exhibited over an area of 14,000 square metres.

== History ==
The Old Acropolis Museum was on the Acropolis; it was completed in 1874 and underwent moderate expansion in the 1950s. However, successive excavations on the Acropolis uncovered many new artifacts and a larger location was deemed necessary to accommodate for the Elgin Marbles from the British Museum.

=== Competitions for the new museum ===
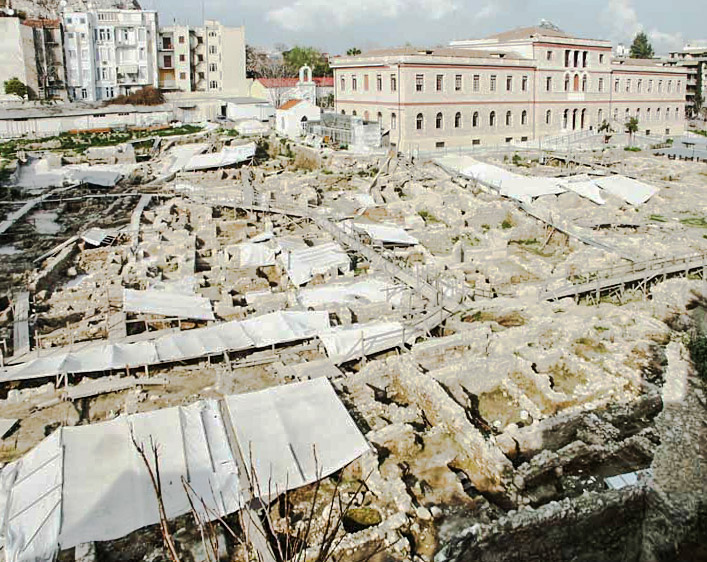
The archaeological site over which the new museum is built – the pink Weiler Building is seen top right, the two buildings scheduled for demolition are seen top left, with the rocky hill of Acropolis barely visible behind them.

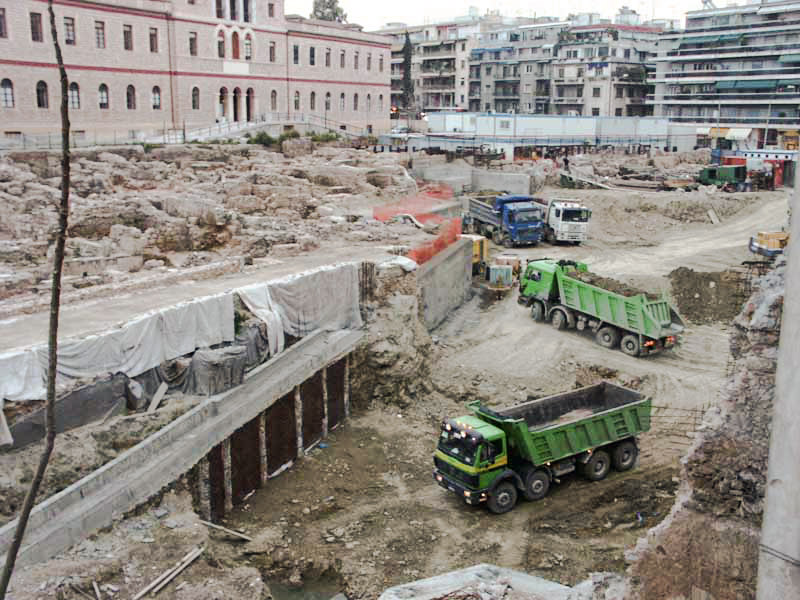
Εarthworks in the archaeological site in Makrygianni, during the construction of the museum.

The first architectural competition for the new museum was held in 1976 and was limited to participants from Greece. In both the 1976 competition and one that followed it in 1979, the location was deemed unsuitable.

In 1989, a third competition for the design of the new museum was announced. This time the competition was international and offered a choice of three possible sites. The winners were the Italian architects, Manfredi Nicoletti and Lucio Passarelli. After delays throughout the 1990s, work progressed to the stage of excavations for the foundations, but work was stopped in 1999 after the discovery of sensitive archaeological remains on the site. The location was the large lot of the unused "Camp Makrygianni" gendarmerie barracks, opposite the Theater of Dionysus. The barracks had been built on public land but a number of private homes were expropriated to carry out the project. The main building of the old barracks, the neoclassical "Weiler Building", was renovated to house the Museum of the Center for the Acropolis Studies.

The fourth competition had made no provision for the preservation of the ancient site. These were met to a degree only after local and international (ICOMOS) campaigners exposed this oversight and it became the final competition. The new plans were adjusted so that the building was elevated above ground, on pillars. Competition was open only to architectural practices by invitation and it was won by New York–based architect, Bernard Tschumi, in collaboration with the Greek architect Michael Photiadis. Excavation has revealed two layers of modest, private roadside houses and workshops, one from the early Byzantine era and another from the classical era. Once the layout and stratigraphy of the findings were established, suitable locations for the foundation pillars were identified. These traverse the soil to the underlying bedrock and float on roller bearings able to withstand a Richter scale magnitude 10 earthquake.

As construction work neared completion, the operation to move the historic artifacts the 280-meter (310 yd) distance from the Acropolis rock to the new museum started in October 2007, took four months, and required the use of three tower cranes to move the sculptures across the distance without mishap. Greek officials expressed their hope that the new museum will help in the campaign for the return of the Parthenon Marbles.

== Location ==
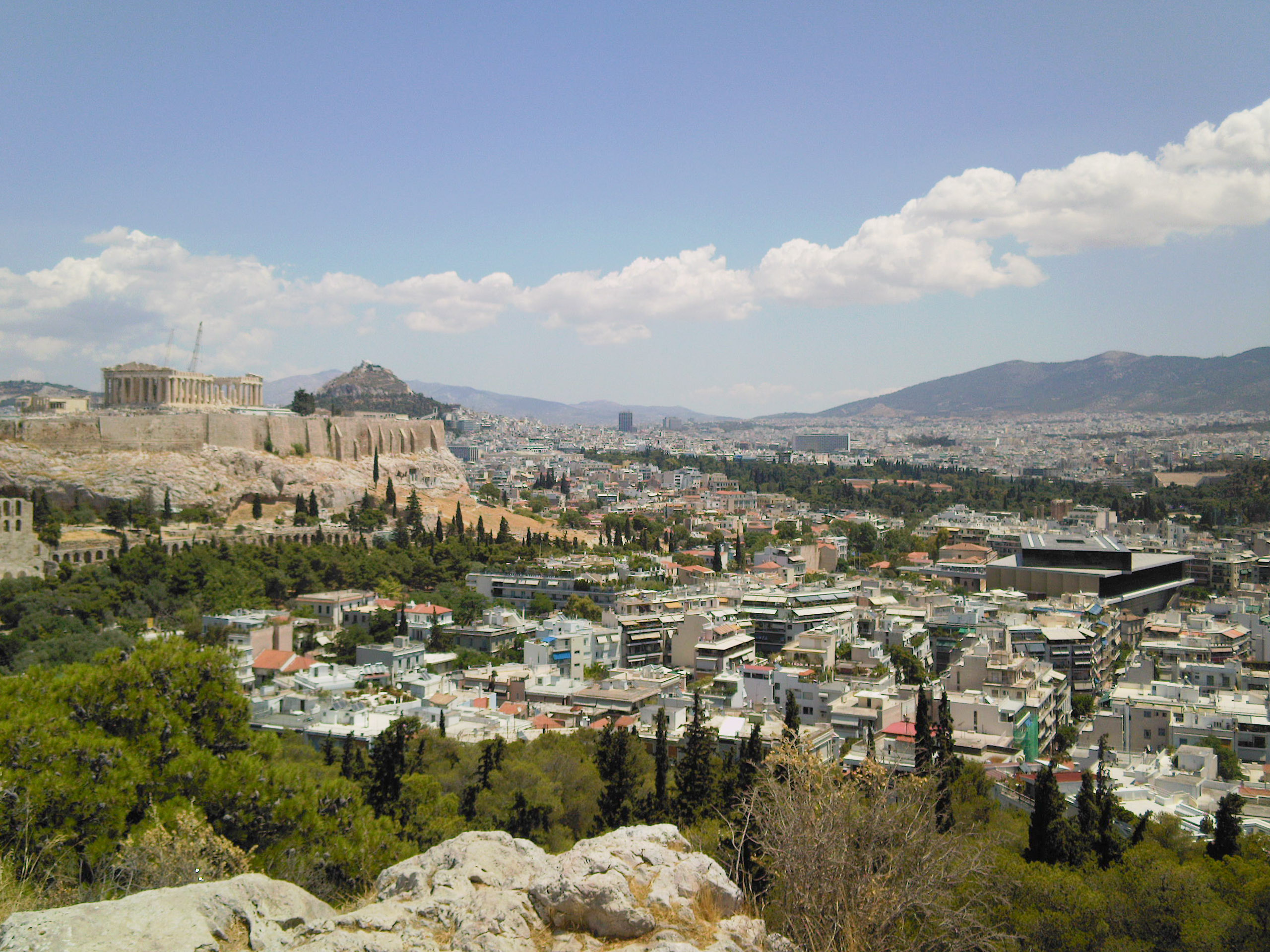
Parthenon (left) and Acropolis Museum (right).

The Acropolis Museum entrance

The museum is located by the southeastern slope of the Acropolis hill, on the ancient road that led up to the "sacred rock" in classical times. Set only 280 meters (310 yd), away from the Parthenon, and a 400 meters (440 yd) walking distance from it, the museum is the largest modern building erected so close to the ancient site, although many other buildings from the last 150 years are located closer to the Acropolis. The entrance to the building is on Dionysiou Areopagitou Street and directly adjacent to the Akropoli metro station the red line of the Athens Metro.

== The building ==
The design by Bernard Tschumi was selected as the winning project in the fourth competition. Tschumi's design revolved around three concepts: light, movement, and a tectonic and programmatic element.

The collections of the museum are exhibited on three levels while a fourth middle-level houses the auxiliary spaces such as the museum shop, the café, and the offices. On the first level of the museum, there are the findings of the slopes of the Acropolis. The long and rectangular hall has a sloping floor, resembling the ascension to the rock. Following the hall is a large trapezoidal hall that contains the archaic findings. On the same floor, there are artifacts and sculptures from the other Acropolis buildings such as the Erechtheum, the Temple of Athena Nike, and the Propylaea and findings from Roman and early Christian Athens. Visitors are intended to see the latter during descent in order to keep the chronological order: they will first be directed to the top level, which displays the Parthenon marbles.

The top level of the Museum sits askew on the lower levels to achieve the same cardinal orientation of the ancient temple on the Acropolis. The spacing of the columns of the Parthenon hall is the same as that of the ancient temple and the use of glass walls on all four exterior walls allows the natural light to illumine the Parthenon marbles as they do on the ancient temple. Unlike the British Museum's Duveen Gallery, where the Parthenon marbles are displayed looking inwards, in the Acropolis Museum, the pediments, metopes and frieze are displayed facing outwards, as they did on Parthenon. The 48 columns in the Parthenon hall mark the outline of the ancient temple and form a colonnade for the display of the Parthenon marbles. For ease of viewing, the pediment marbles are displayed at eye level in front of the end columns; the metopes are displayed on the columns, two per column, but not as high as in the ancient temple; and the frieze are displayed behind the metopes, forming a continuous band around the walls of a rectangular space set inside the columns, as in the ancient temple but not as high, again for ease of viewing. From the north side of the Parthenon hall, one can see the ancient temple above on the Acropolis.

As the museum is built over an extensive archaeological site, some parts of the floor uses glass to allow visitors to see the excavations below. Part of this site is accessible to the public through the museum's courtyard. The museum also has an amphitheatre, virtual theatre, and hall for temporary exhibitions.

== Controversy ==
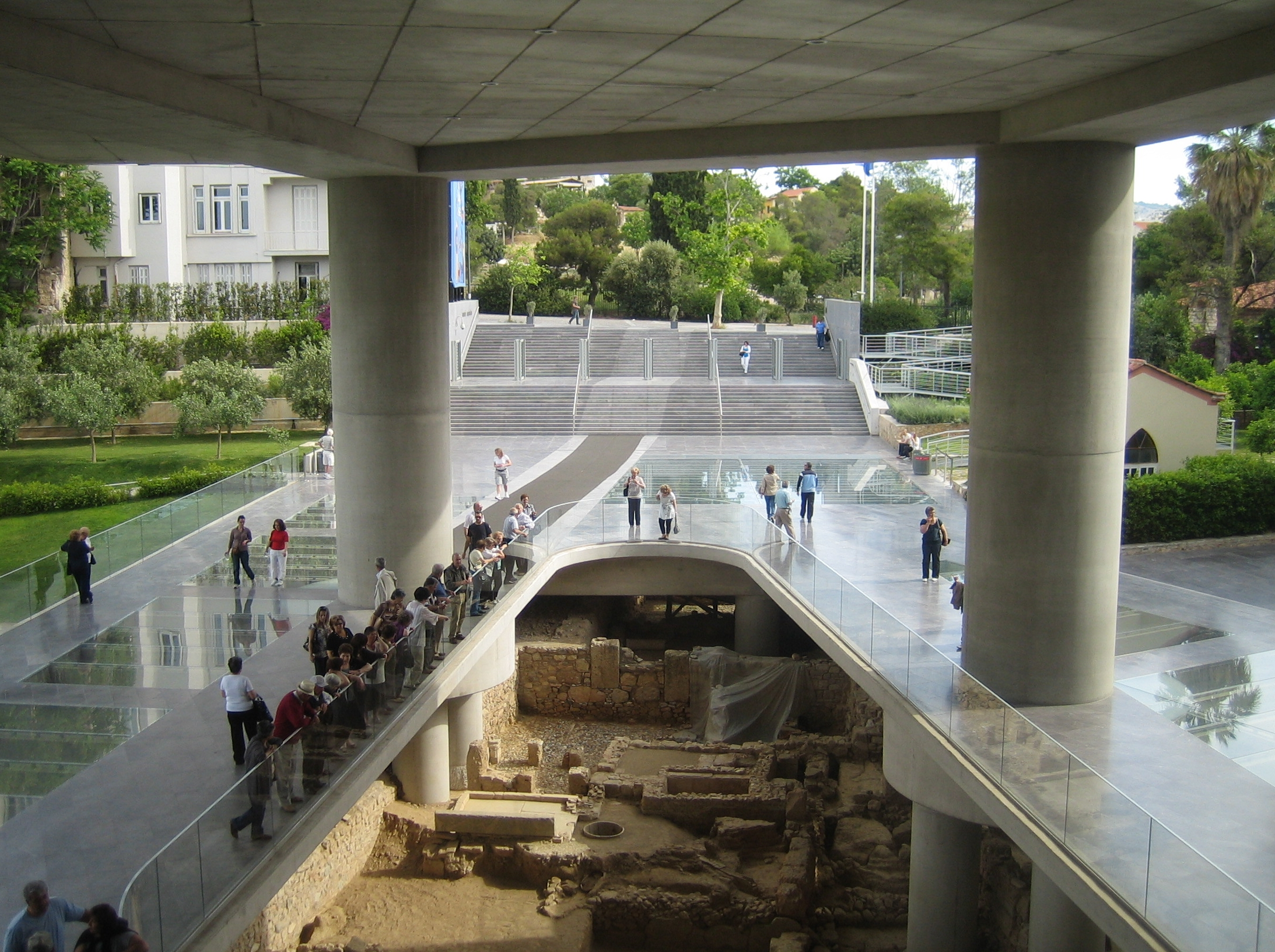
Archaeological site below the main entrance to the museum.

A controversy erupted over the plans of the new museum and whether it was appropriate to build it on the archaeological site in Makrygianni neighbourhood. Another concern was whether a large modern building would fit well into the landscape.

In 2007, another controversy erupted over the proposed demolition of two historic buildings. These are in front of the museum, numbers 17 and 19, Dionysiou Areopagitou Street, facing the Acropolis. Bernard Tschumi has been showing photographic images of the space in front of the museum edited to remove the two buildings and nearby four-story-tall trees. The Greek Government had the two buildings de-listed historically although one is Neo-Classical and the other an example of Art Deco architecture. Protests against the proposed demolition came from international agencies such as INTBAU and ICOMOS.

The permanent exhibition of the new museum, its lighting conditions, and the political nature of the design have been criticised by archaeologists and museum professionals. Historian James Beresford argues that claims that the museum reproduces the lighting conditions envisioned by Phidias are "wildly inaccurate and highly misleading", noting how the soft, dim light of the Duveen Gallery comes much closer to the original viewing conditions of the frieze, placed high on the cella walls and shielded from direct natural light by the entablature of the temple. Epigraphist Bronwen Wickkiser also critised the museum for presenting an idealised 'imaginary Parthenon' that divorces the monument's artistic splendour from the authoritarian hegemonic power that created it. She highlights the conspicuous exclusion of the monumental tribute quota lists, which recorded the subjugation and financial extortion of allied city-states that underwrote the Parthenon’s construction. Archaeologist Mario Trabucco della Torretta also criticised the exhibition, calling it a “propaganda operation in a premium package”. He disapproved of the over-emphasis on the removal, the inconsistency of presenting the cast of the missing pieces for the Parthenon but not for the frieze of Athena Nike, the stripping of the Caryatids' architectural context, and the lack of sensitivity for both the archaeological context underneath the museum and the architectural context surrounding it.

The architectural nature of the building was also criticised by architectural critic Simon Jenkins on The Guardian, who called the museum "a banana republic police HQ".

== Awards ==
- On 13 May 2010, it was awarded the International Association of Lighting Designers (IALD) Award of Excellence and Sustainability.
- On 8 November 2010, the Museum won the British Guild of Travel Writers' (BGTW) award in Globe category for the Best Worldwide Tourism Project for 2010.
- The Museum received 2011 AIA (The American Institute of Architects) Institute Honor Award for Architecture.
- It was among the six finalists competing for the 2011 European Union Prize for Contemporary Architecture – the Mies van der Rohe Award.
- In 2012, the Museum was given the Keck Award for its conservation and restoration of the Caryatids by the International Institute for Conservation (IIC) in Vienna.
- Acropolis museum ranked 6th in the TripAdvisor's Travellers Choice Awards of the 25 Best Museums in the world for 2018.

== Other information ==
- The entrance fee to the museum was €1 for the first year and €5 thereafter. As of 2024, the entrance fee during the winter season (1 November through 30 March) is €10, and €15 during the summer season (1 April - 31 October).
- The excavation below ground level continues. The site and process are visible through the ground level glass flooring. As of June 2019, the site is available for visitation.
- The Acropolis Museum was selected as the motif for a commemorative Euro coin edition: the €10 Greek Acropolis Museum commemorative coin, minted in 2008 to mark the relocation of the museum. On the obverse is a panoramic view of the Acropolis and the new museum lies at the base.
- During the August full moon nights, the museum remains open until midnight and welcomes visitors for free. Night concerts also take place on the museum's courtyard.
- In the first two months since the museum opened, it was visited by 523,540 people (an average of 9,200 a day). Of these, 60 percent were foreign visitors. During the same two-month period, 409,000 hits by unique visitors from 180 countries were recorded by the museum's website.
- Museum of Applied Arts/Contemporary Art in Vienna lent (October 2014 – February 2015) to the Acropolis Museum a quadriga with the goddess Nike from the collection of Theophil Hansen, an architect of neoclassical buildings in Greece and central Europe in the 19th century.
- The University of Sydney's Nicholson Museum lent (December 2014 – December 2015) to the Acropolis Museum a model of the Acropolis done in Lego. The model contains more than 120,000 Lego bricks and took about 300 hours to build by Ryan McNaught.
- The Silver Cup designed by Michel Bréal and awarded to the Marathon Winner Spyros Louis at the first Modern Olympic Games (1896) is displayed at the Acropolis Museum. The Cup remained in the Acropolis Museum until the completion of the Stavros Niarchos Foundation Cultural Center where it is now exhibited.
- Hermitage Museum lent (March 2016 – October 2016) to the Acropolis Museum three golden Scythian exhibitions. The three objects were two vessels and a piece of jewelry. These masterpieces of metalworking were crafted by the Greeks at Crimea that had developed a close relationship with the Scythians.
- In June 2016, Samsung inaugurated a digital classroom at the Acropolis Museum. The digital classroom addressed to students of primary and secondary schools. This digital classroom was the first "classroom" which was set up in a Museum in Greece and the fifth in Europe.
- The US President Barack Obama visited the Acropolis museum during his visit at Athens (15–16 November 2016).
- On 24 March – 31 October 2017, Documenta 14, the fourteenth edition of the art exhibition documenta took place at the Acropolis Museum.
- On 21 June 2019, Greece's Acropolis Museum opened an excavation site underneath its modern building, allowing visitors for the first time to walk through an ancient Athenian neighbourhood that survived from the Classical era to Byzantine times.

== Gallery ==
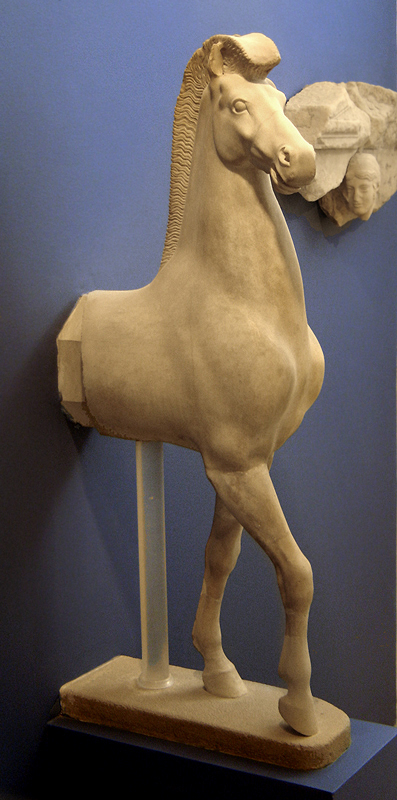
Horse (6th BC)

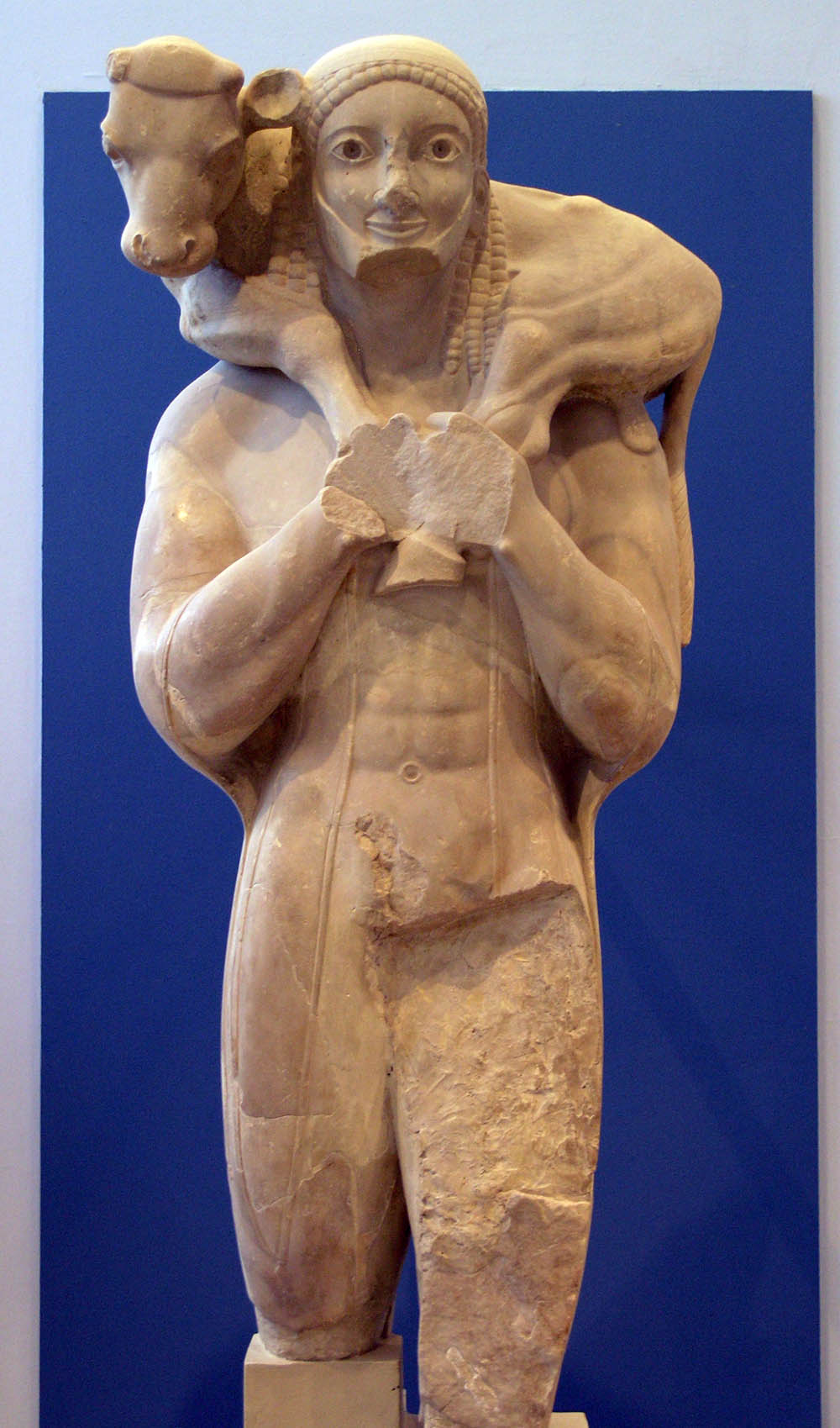
Moschophoros (560 BC)

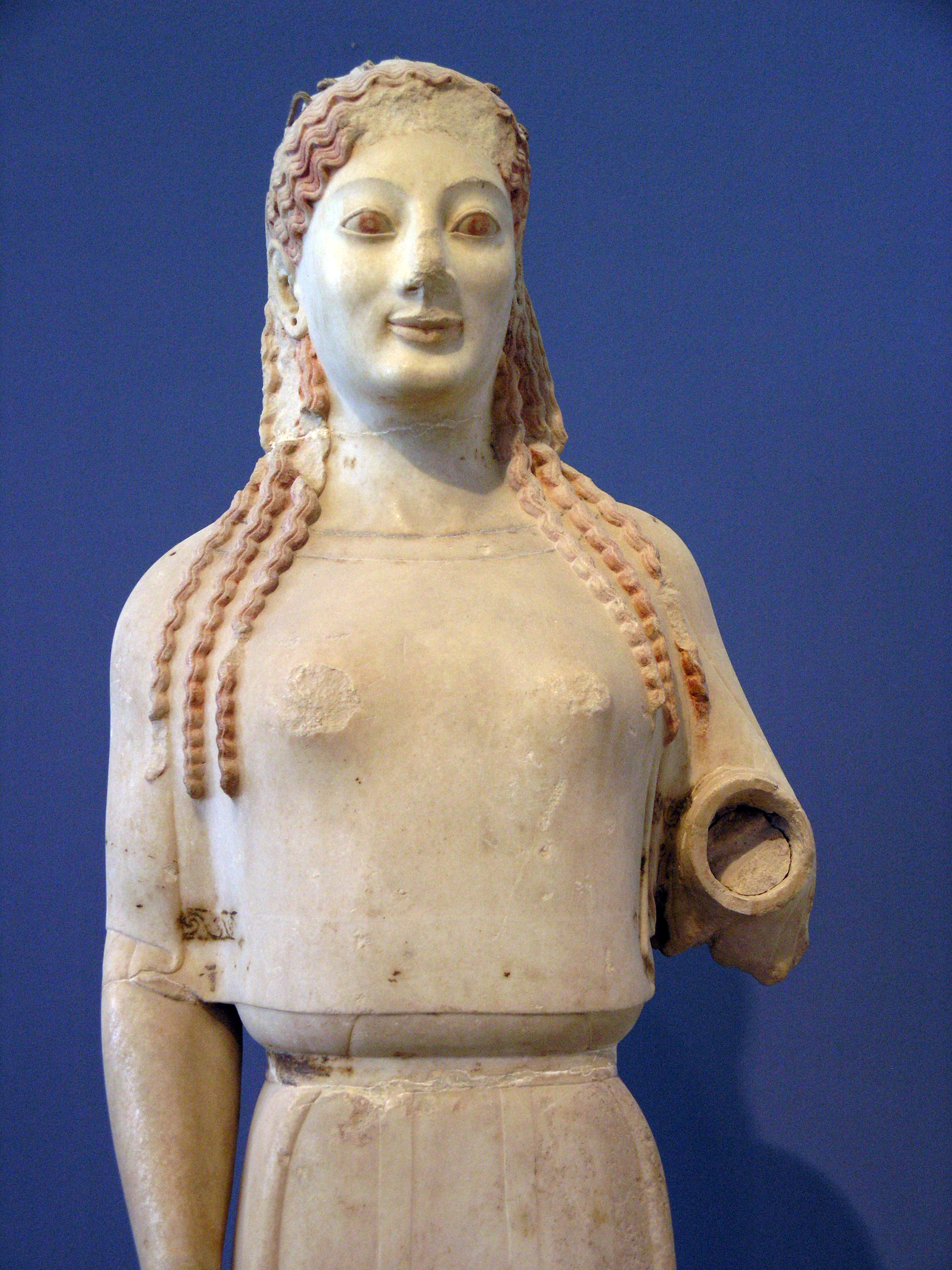
Peplos Kore (c. 530 BC)

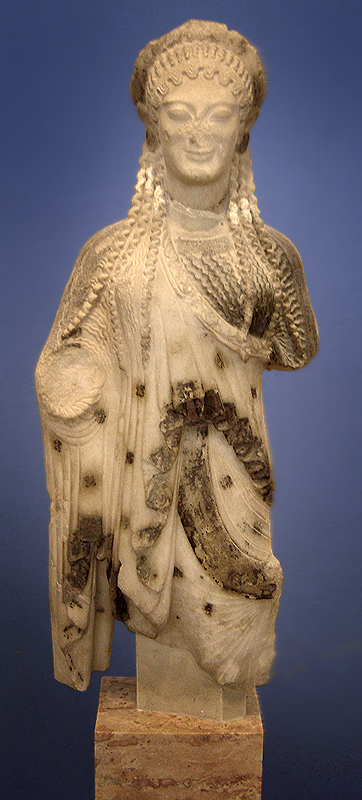
Acropolis Kore (510 BC)

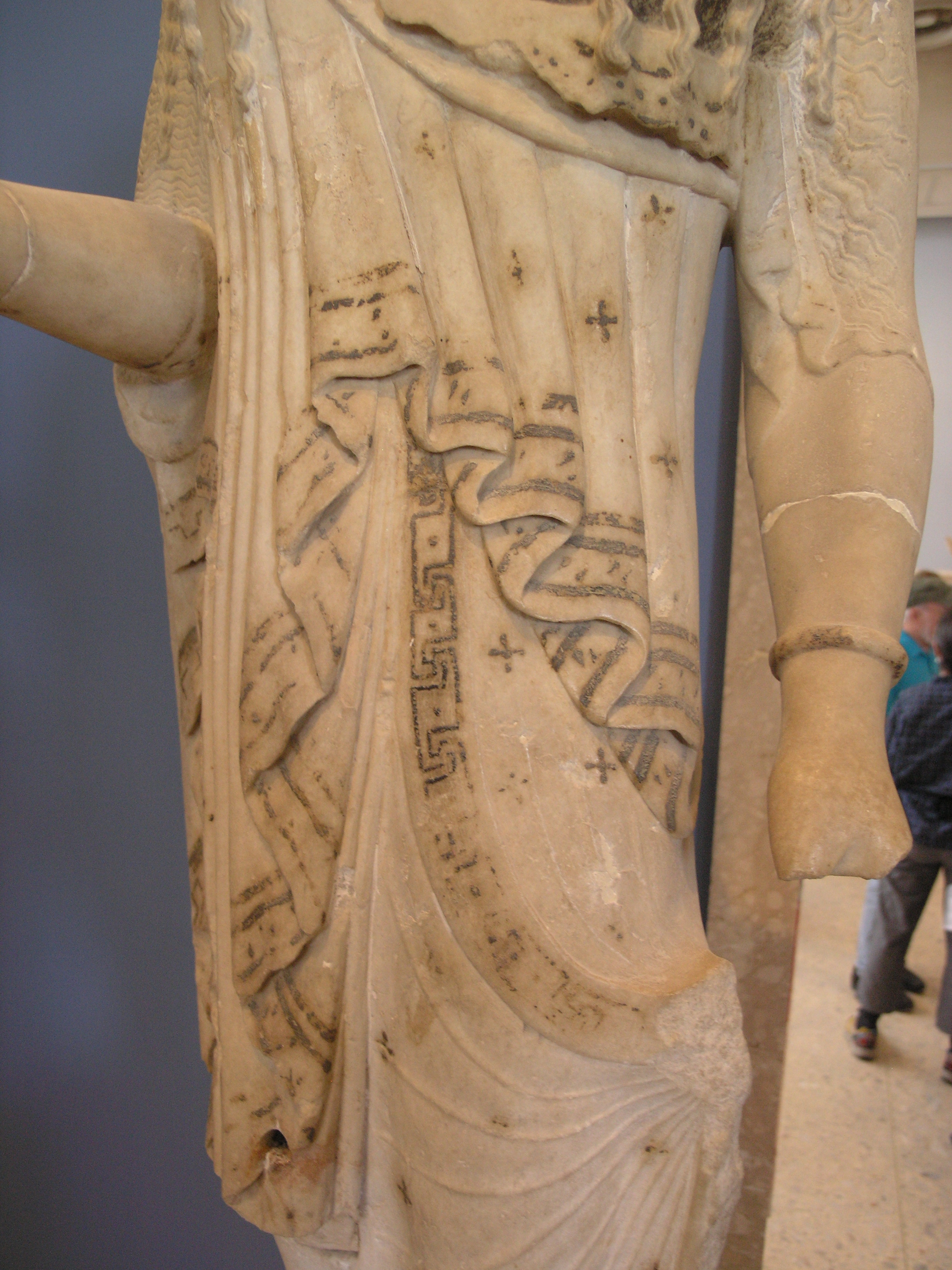
Detail of a Kore (530–520 BC)

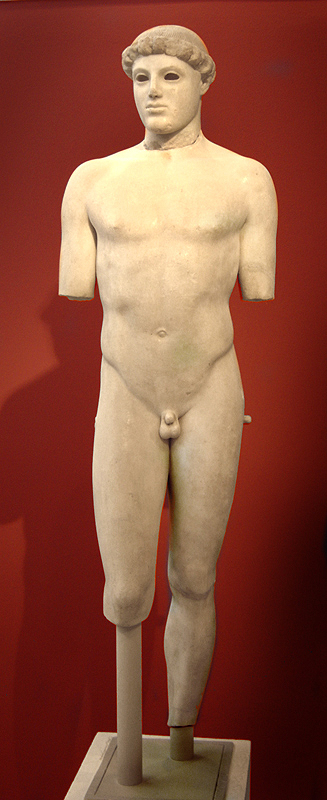
Kritios boy (c.480 BC)

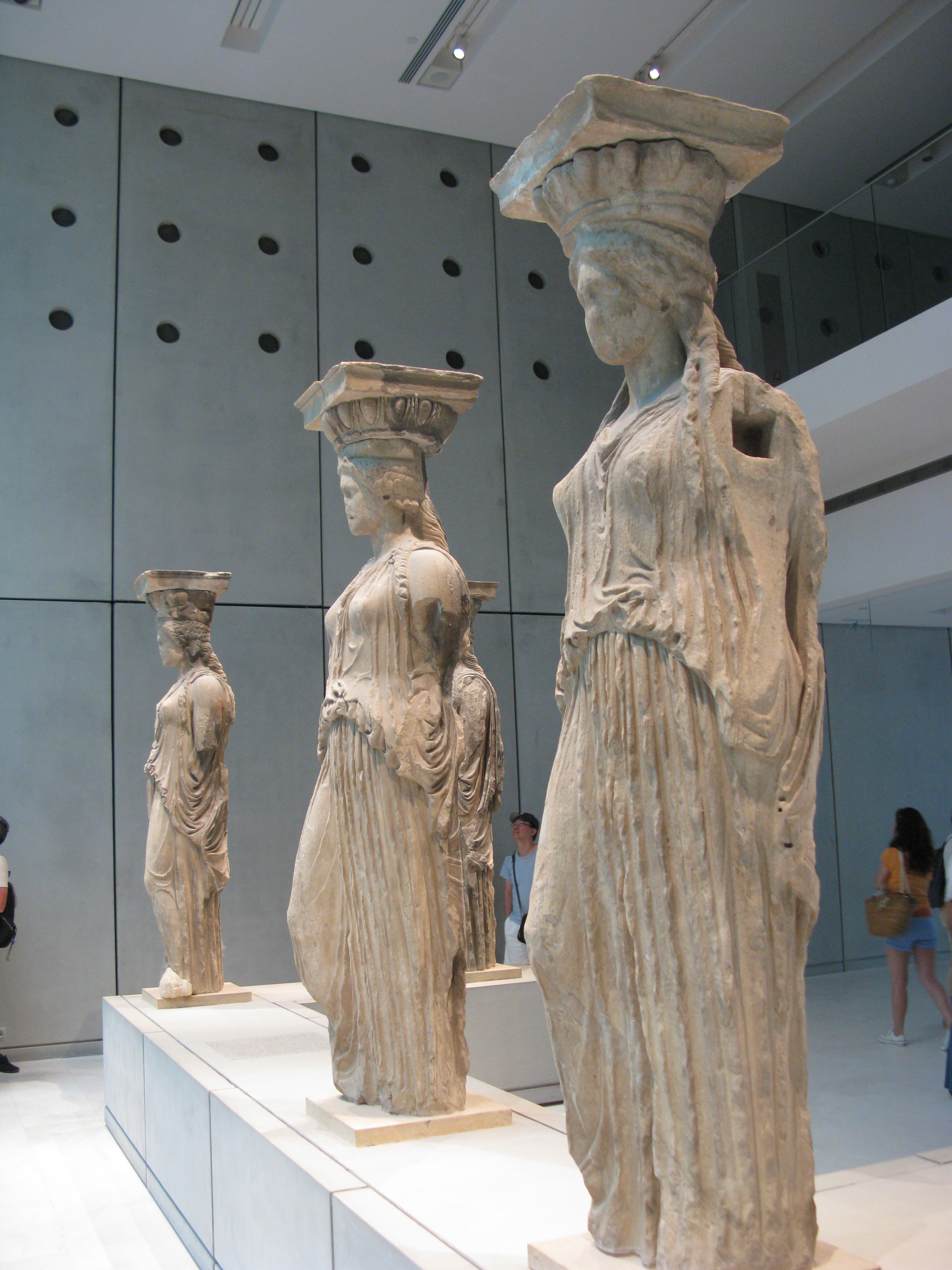
Caryatids of Erechtheum

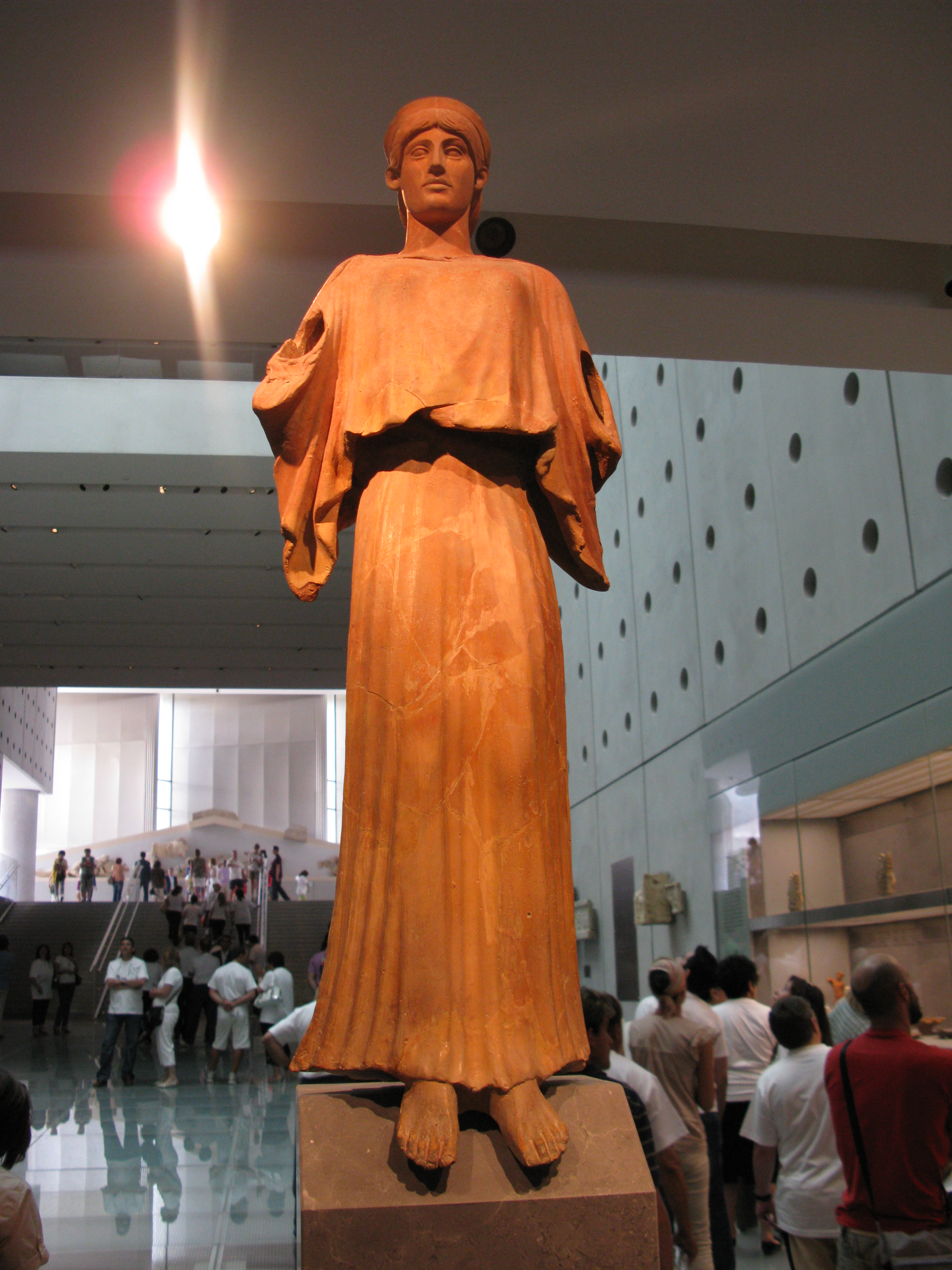
Goddess Nike (1st to 3rd century AD)

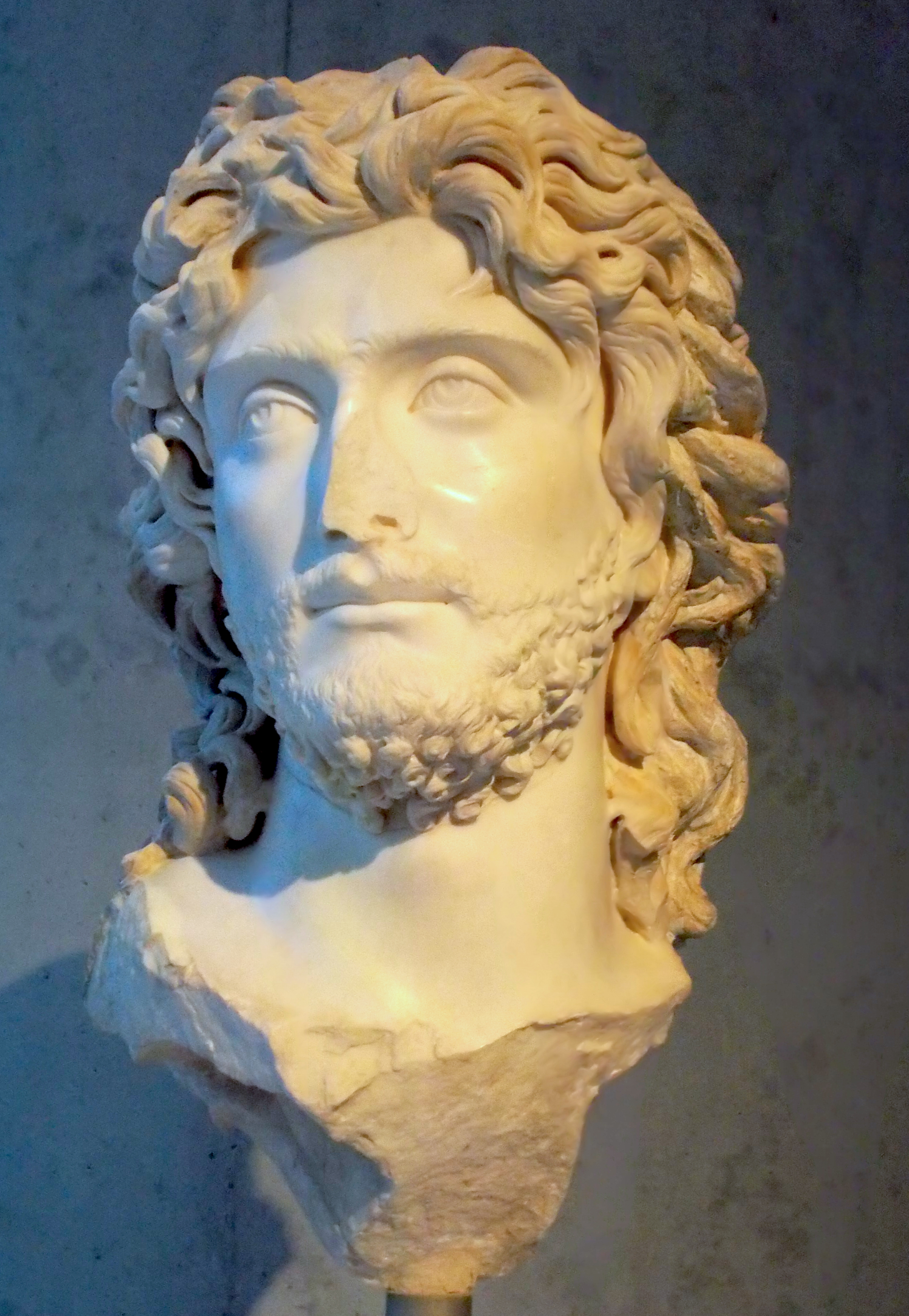
Bust of Tiberius Julius Sauromates II

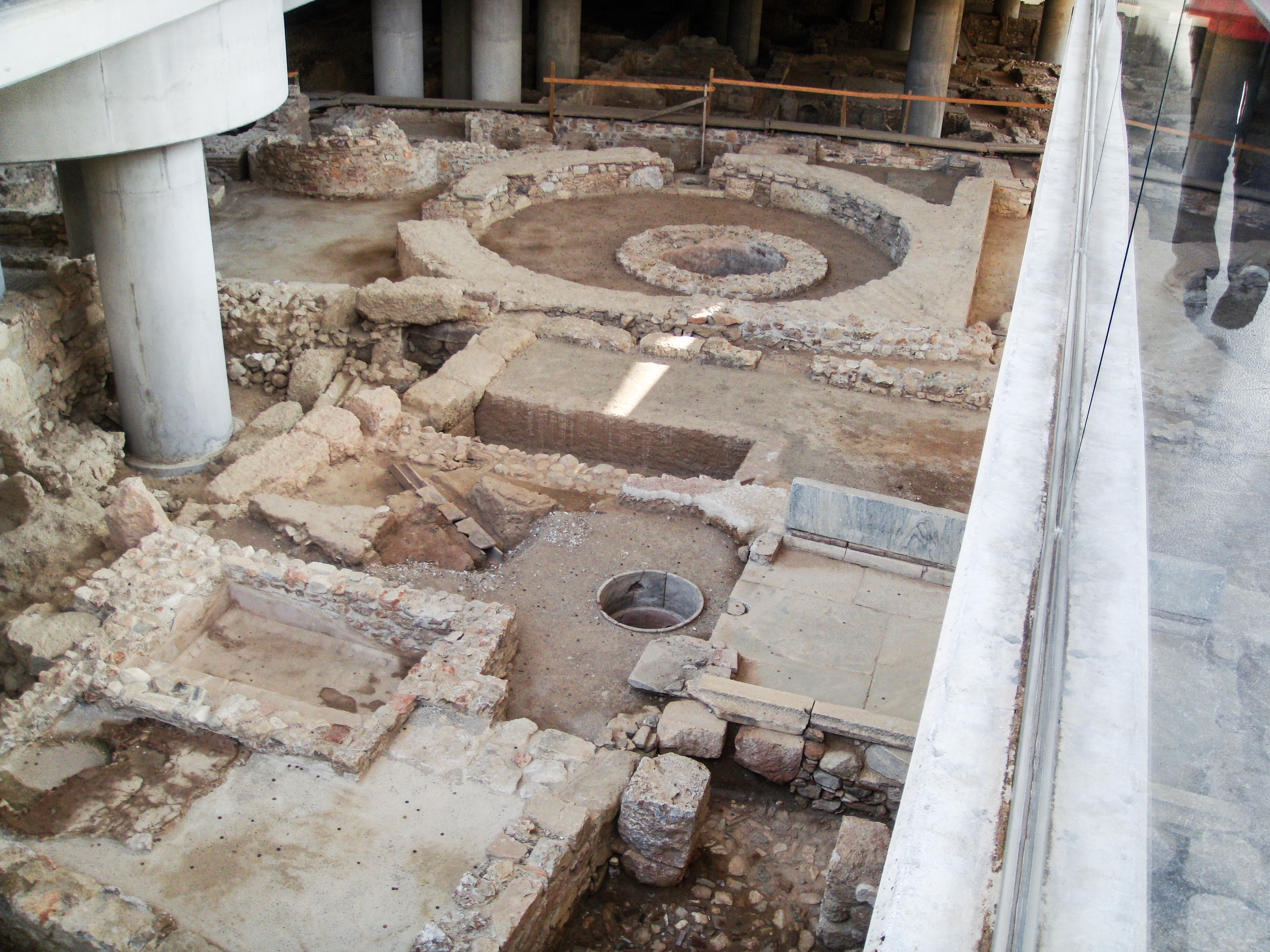
Archaeological site below the main entrance to the museum

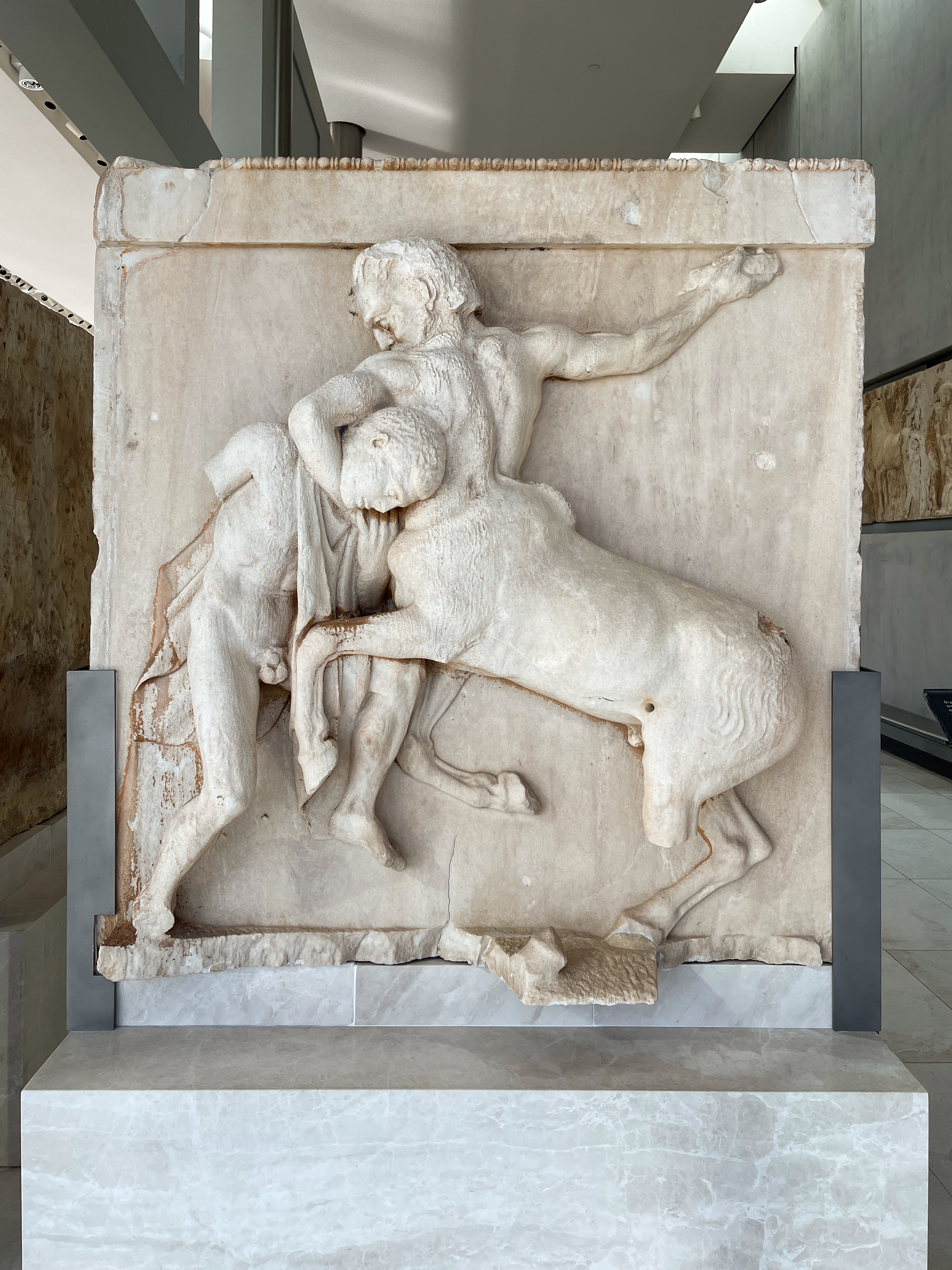
Recently removed metope from the Parthenon, depicts a Centaur and Lapith in battle.

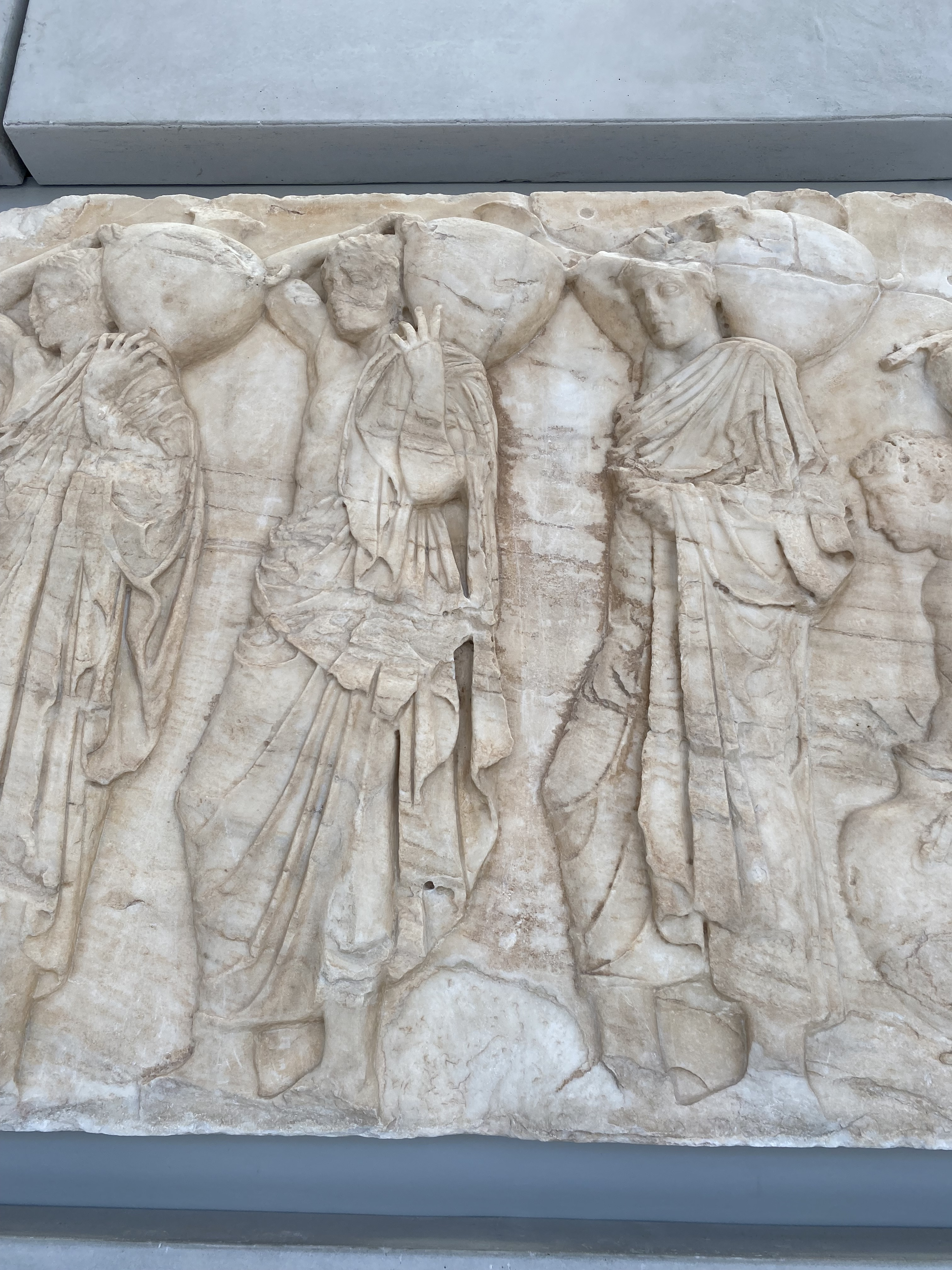
Three young men holding "hydriai" (water jugs), part of the Panathenaic procession depicted in the Parthenon frieze.

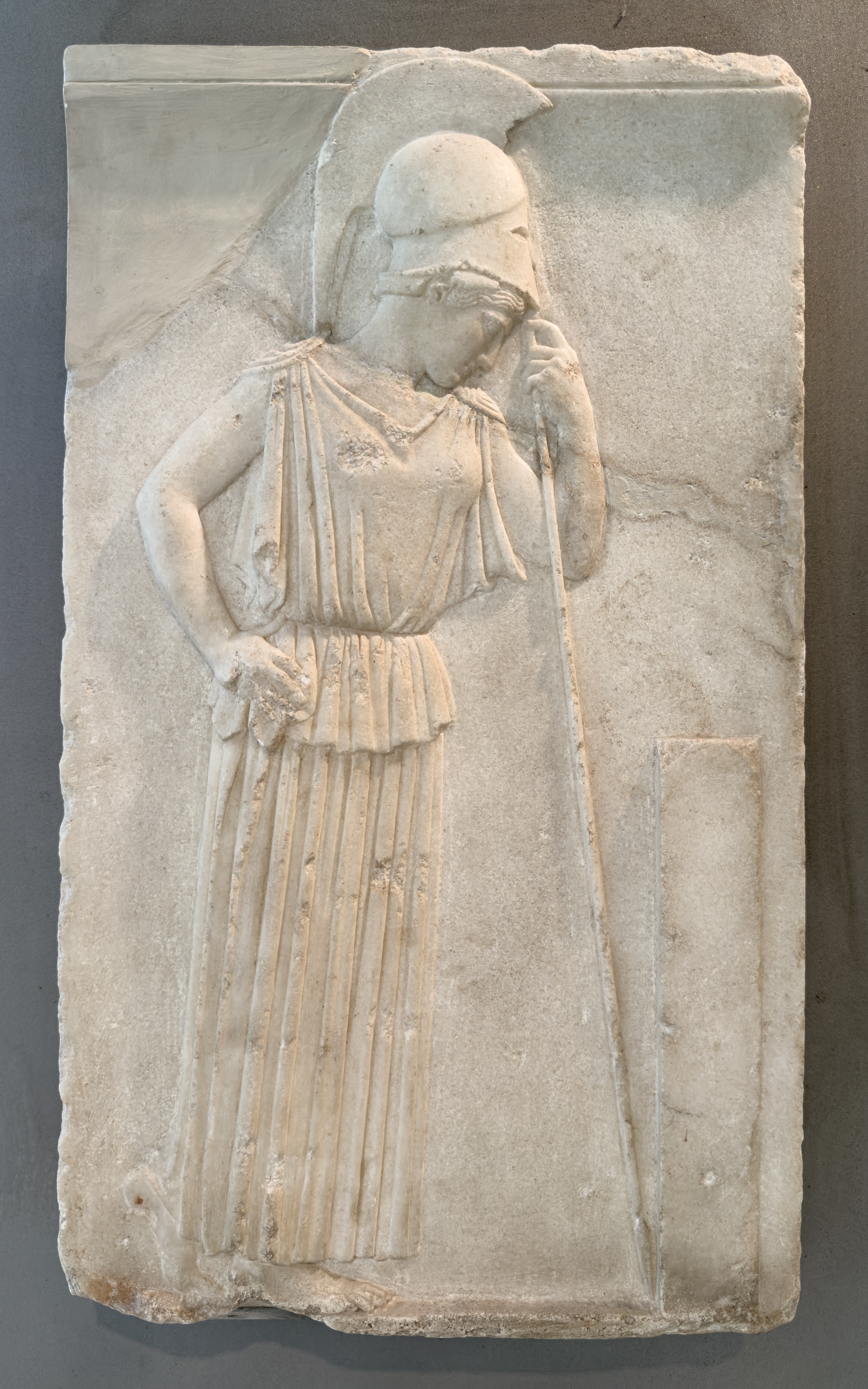
The Pensive Athena, dating from c. 460 BC, it depicts Athena leaning on her spear, glancing down at a stele.

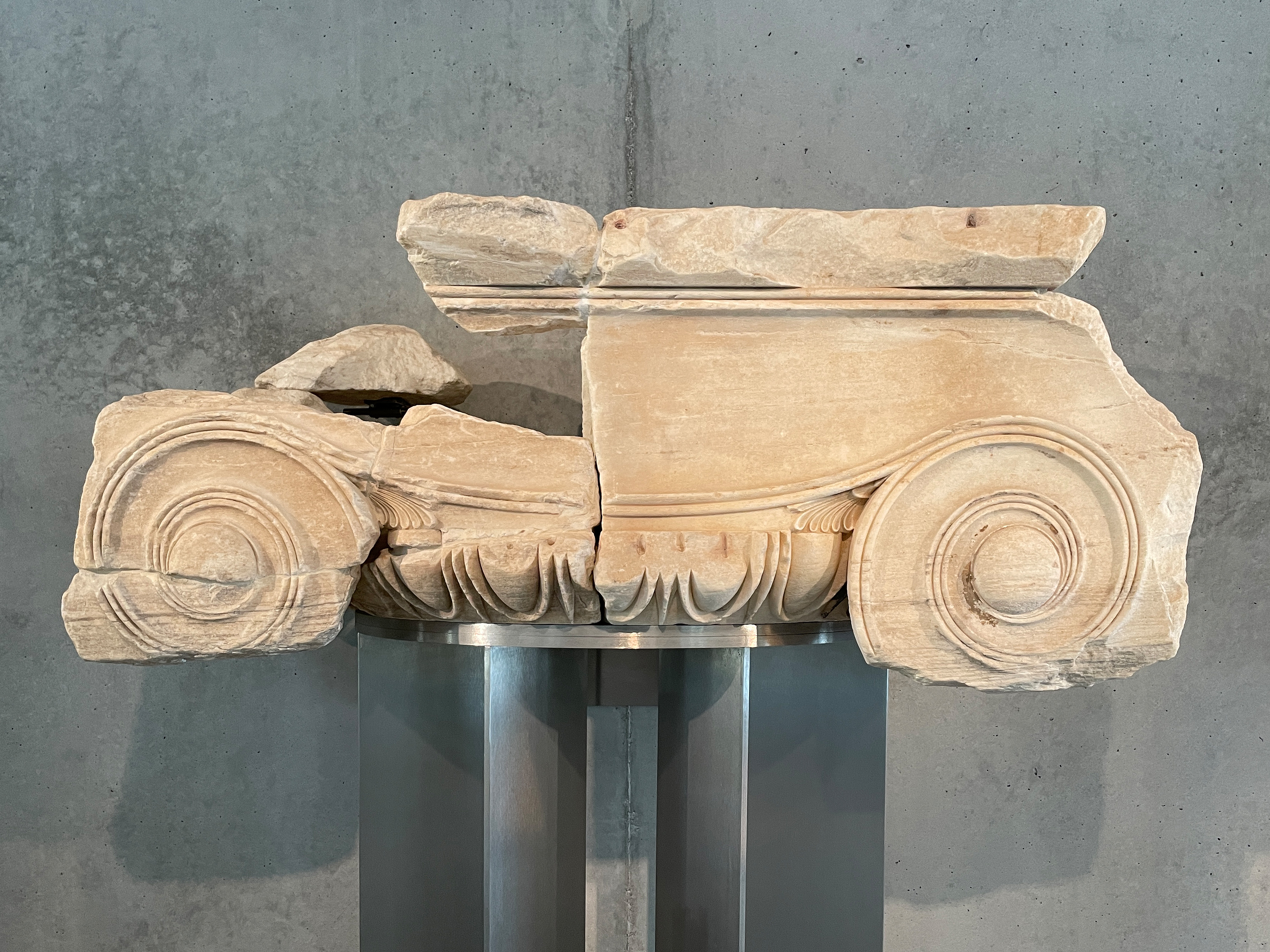
Ionic capital from the Propylon of the Acropolis.

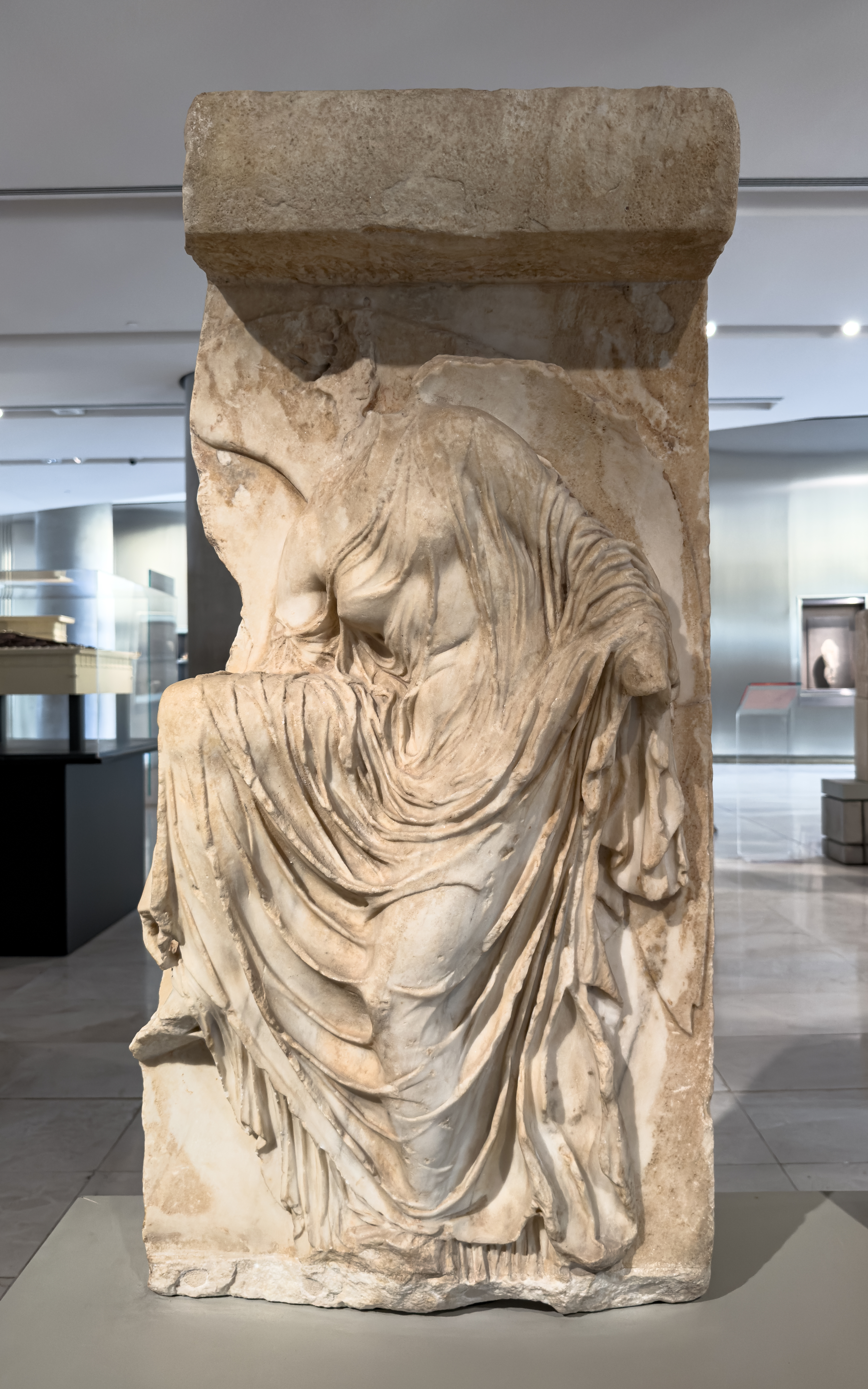
Nike adjusting her sandal, once part of the parapet beside the Temple of Athena Nike, c. 410 BC.

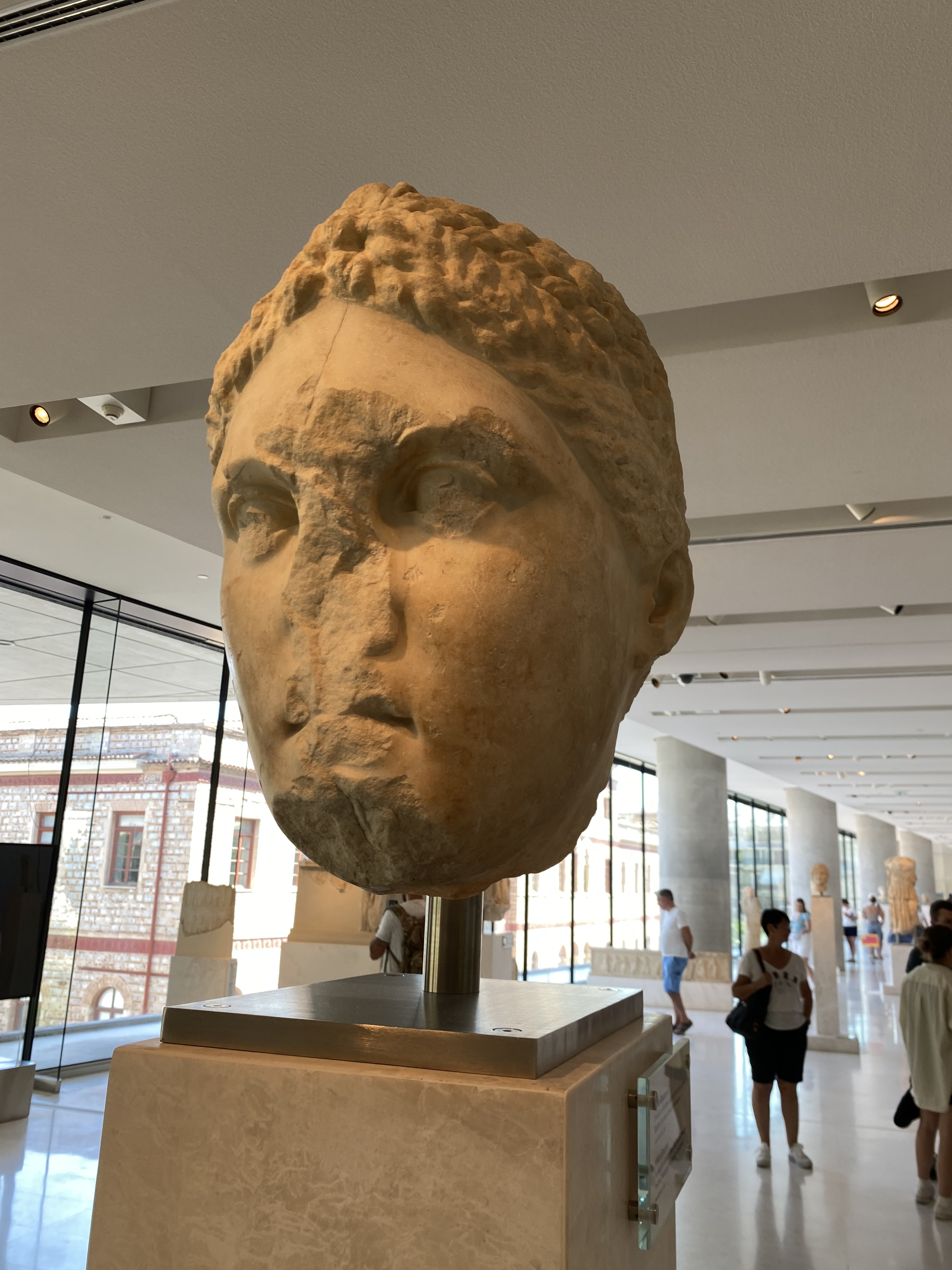
Statue head of Artemis Brauronia, possibly by Praxiteles, c. 330 BC. Found at the Sanctuary of Artemis Brauronia at the Acropolis.

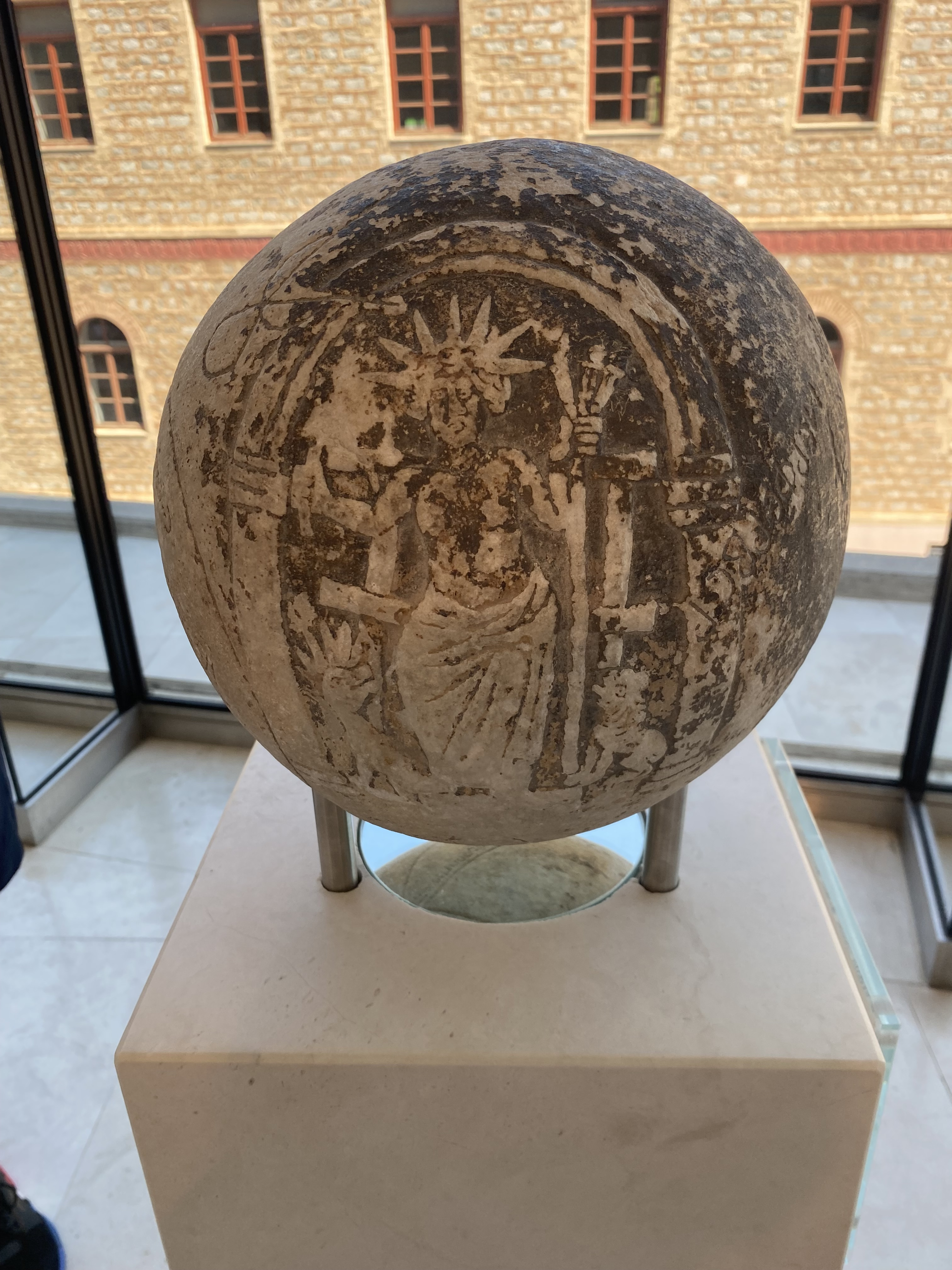
A magic sphere depicting Helios seated below an arch with a whip in one hand and three torches in the other. Seated next to Helios are two dogs which may represent Sirius and Procyon. 2nd–3rd century AD.

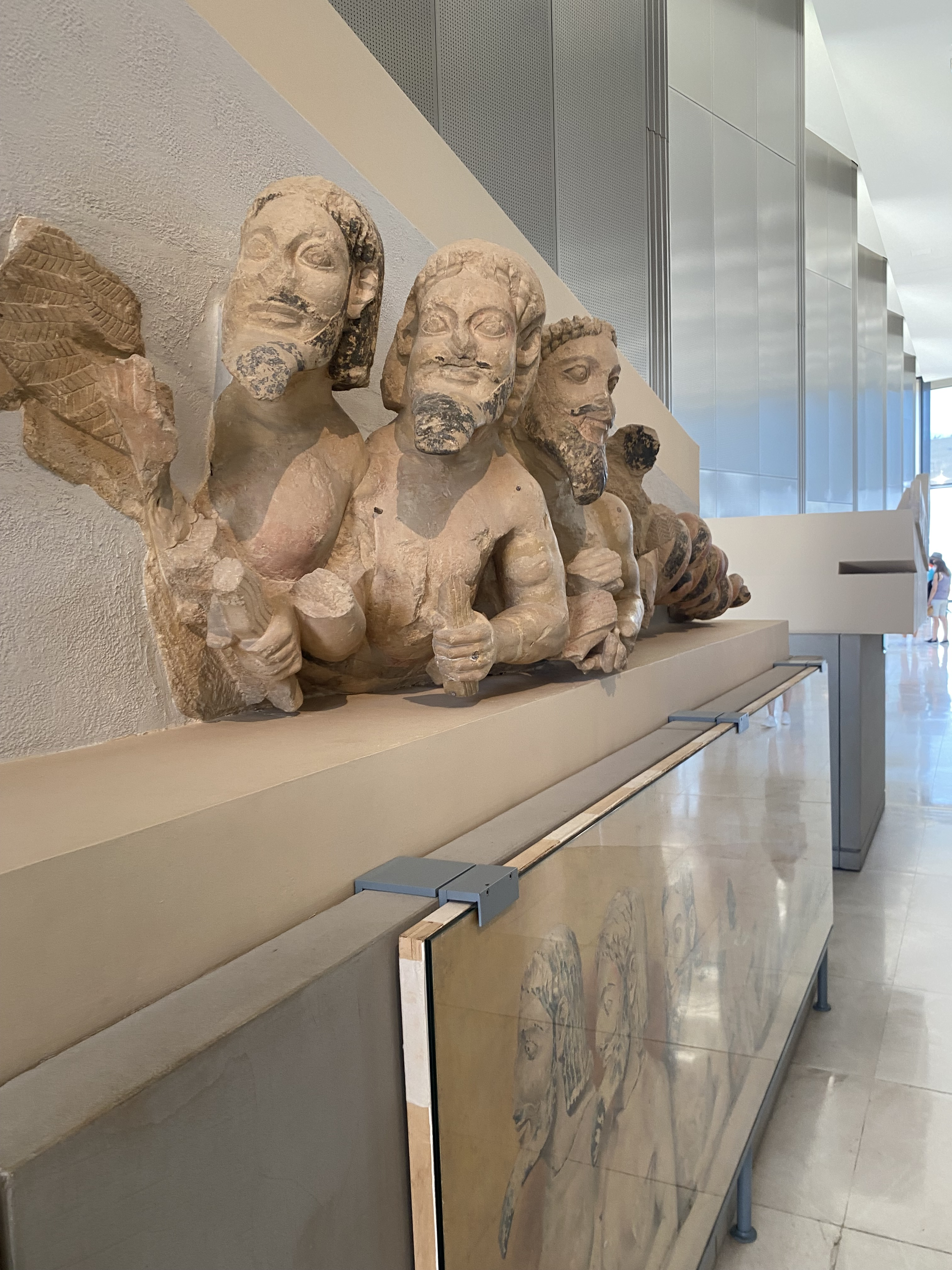
A three-bodied Daemon which was part of the pediment of the Hekatompedon temple, built between 570–550 BC. Later demolished in 490 BC.

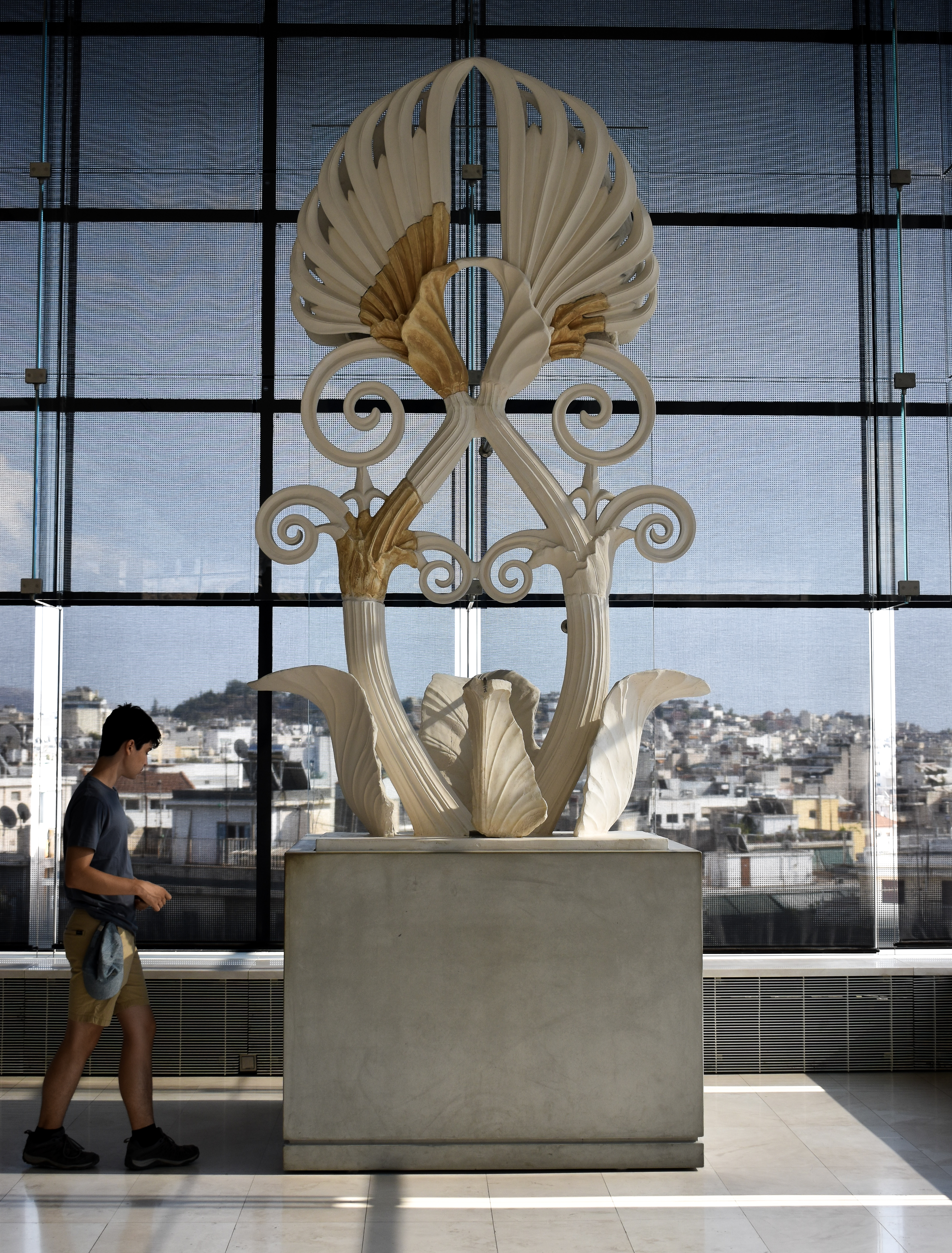
The acroterion of the Parthenon, c. 447-438 B.C, constructed from marble derived from Mount Pentelicus

== See also ==
- Elgin Marbles
- Old Acropolis Museum, now closed and scheduled to house workshops for the ongoing Acropolis Restoration Project

== Bibliography ==
- Tschumi, Bernard; Pandermalis, Dimitrios; Aesopos, Yannis; Rutten, Joel (2009). The New Acropolis Museum. Skira Rizzoli. ISBN 978-0847834198.
- Tschumi, Bernard (2010). New Acropolis Museum. Ediciones Poligrafa. ISBN 978-8434312340.
