= Museum of the Center for the Acropolis Studies =

Coordinates: 37°58′8.02″N 23°43′43.97″E

Center for the Acropolis Studies
- Κέντρο Μελετών Ακροπόλεως
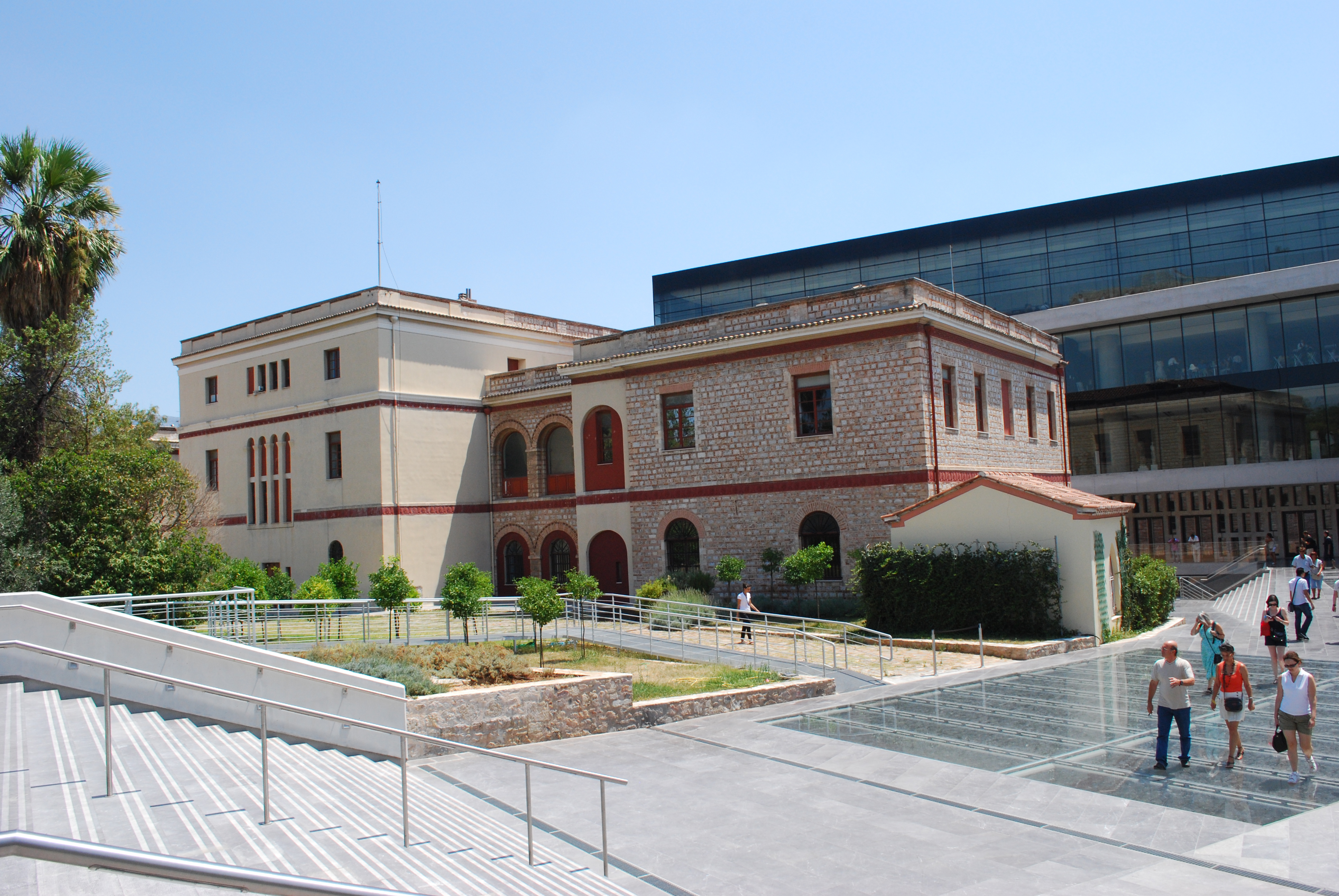
- Location: Weiler Building, Athens, Greece
- Type: Archaeological Museum

The Museum of the Center for the Acropolis Studies (Greek: Κέντρο Μελετών Ακροπόλεως) is a museum in Athens, Greece, a part of the new Acropolis Museum and its research workshops. It is housed in the Weiler Building, named after the Bavarian engineer, who designed it in 1834, and constructed it in 1836. It was created under the direction of the archaeologist Evi Touloupa while she was director of the Athens Ephorate of Prehistoric and Classical Antiquities.

After serving as a military hospital and a gendarmes barracks, Weiler Building was remodelled from 1985 to 1987 and was converted to a museum. Its collections include casts of the Parthenon sculptures, plaster models of the Acropolis illustrating the architectural development of the monuments from the Neolithic to present times, and a permanent exhibition on the works of conservation and restoration and exhibits concerning the Erechtheion, and other Acropolis monuments.
