= Nike (mythology) =

Personification of victory in Greek mythology

- Goddess of victory
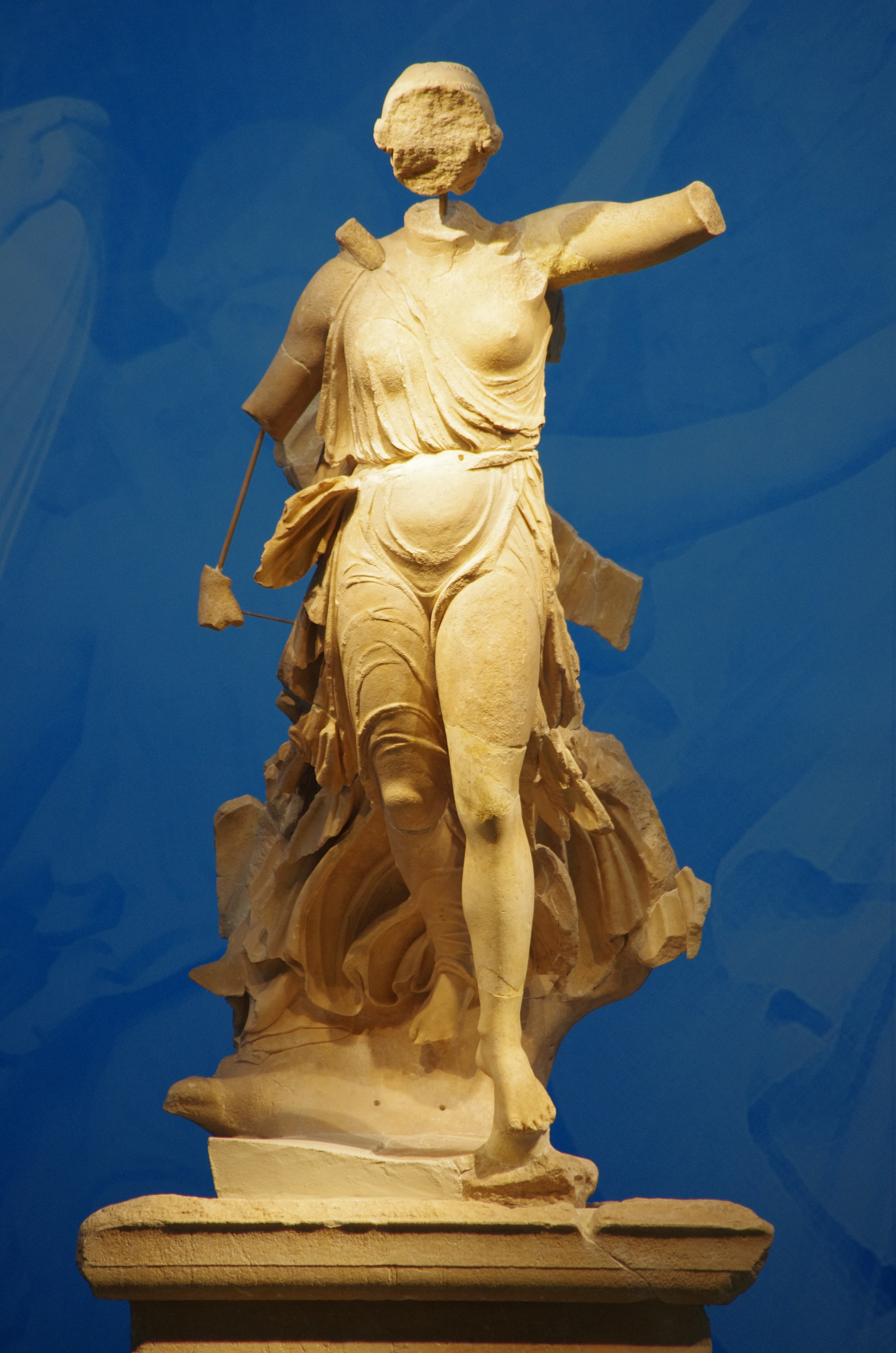
- The Nike of Paionios, Olympia, Archaeological Museum (c. 420 BC).
- Abode: Mount Olympus

Genealogy
- Parents: Pallas and Styx
- Siblings: Kratos, Bia, and Zelus

Equivalents
- Roman: Victoria

In Greek mythology and ancient religion, Nike (Ancient Greek: Νίκη, lit. 'Victory') is the personification of the abstract concept of victory. She was the goddess of victory in battle, as well as in other kinds of contests. According to Hesiod's Theogony, she is the daughter of Styx and the Titan Pallas, and the sister of similar personifications: Zelus, Kratos, and Bia (i.e. Rivalry, Strength, and Force).

Nike is little-attested in the archeological record but appears to have had a close association with Zeus and Athena. She was one of the first gods to support Zeus in his overthrow of the Titans, and because of this Zeus always kept Nike with him. Nonnus makes her the attendant of Athena, and gives her a role in Zeus's victory over Typhon. In Athens, she was particularly associated with Athena, and the cult of Athena Nike. In art Nike is typically portrayed as winged and moving at great speed. Her Roman equivalent is the goddess Victoria.

== Etymology ==
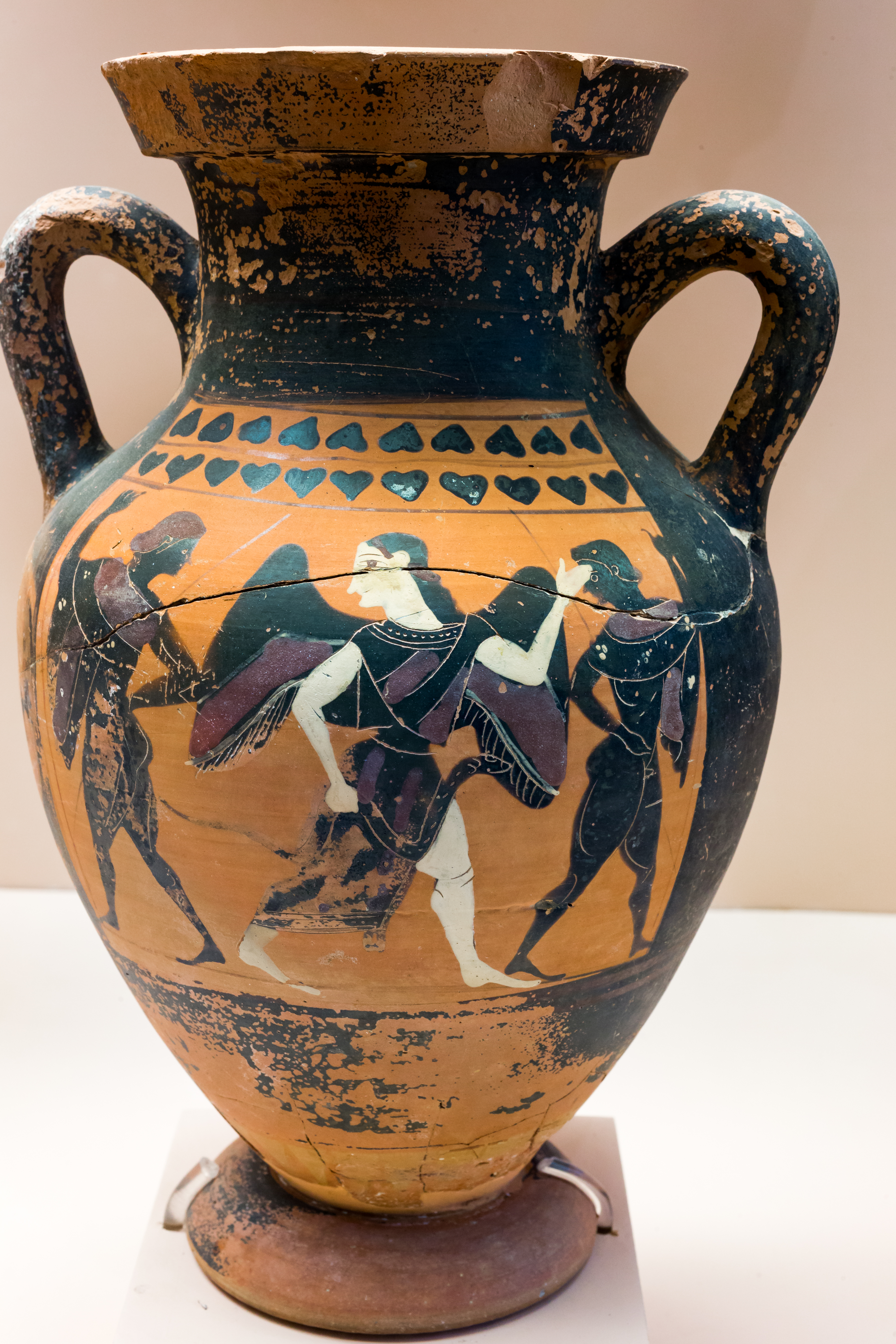
Nike striding between two youths with spears; Archaeological Museum of Rhodes 15590 (c. 550–500 BC).

The name derives from the Greek noun νίκη níkē meaning "victory", "upper hand [in battle or contest]". The word is of uncertain origin, probably related to Ancient Greek: νεῖκος neîkos "strife" and the verb νεικεῖν neikeîn "to quarrel"; ultimately also of uncertain, possibly pre-Greek, etymology. R. S. P. Beekes finds the word unrelated to Proto-Indo-European *ni-h₃kʷo- and sees no strong evidence for the proposed relation with νεῖκος and the Lithuanian ap-ni̇̀kti "to attack". In the Doric Greek dialect, the name was alternatively spelled as Νίκα Níka. The word gave several compounds in Ancient Greek, including the name Νικηφόρος Nikephoros "carrying away victory" and, through the verb νικάω nikáo "to win", it gave the epithet νικάτωρ nikátōr "victor".

== Family ==
Hesiod, in his Theogony, has Nike as the daughter of Styx and the Titan Pallas, and the sister of Zelus, Kratos, and Bia. In one of the Homeric Hymns, Ares the god of war is said to be the "father of warlike Victory [Nike]". According to Dionysius of Halicarnassus, the Arcadians had a legend that Nike was the daughter of Pallas (the son of their legendary king Lycaon), to whom Zeus gave Athena when she was born to be raised by him, and so was Athena's foster-sister. Or like Athena, Nike could be thought of as the daughter of Zeus himself.

== Mythology ==
Nike had little to no independent mythology. She was closely associated with both Zeus and Athena, and can appear as a constant companion or attribute of either god. In her earliest mention, by Hesiod, Nike is said to have received honors from Zeus for her support of Zeus in his overthrow of the Titans, but no details are given. Following Hesiod, Nike's next several mentions occur, not in connection with military victory, but rather in the granting of victory in other kinds of contests (agones), including athletic or theatrical competitions. The fifth-century AD Greek poet Nonnus gave Nike a minor role in Zeus's battle with Typhon.

=== Titanomachy ===
The first mention of Nike occurs in the Theogony of Hesiod (c. 730–700 BC). According to Hesiod's account, in preparation for the Titanomachy, the Olympians' war against the Titans, Zeus called all the gods to Mount Olympus to determine their allegiance. He declared that any god that chose to align with him against Cronus would receive his honor and favor. The first to do so was Styx, who brought Zeus her children: Nike, the personification of victory, and her brothers Zelus, Kratos, and Bia, the personifications of glory, power and strength. Nike and her siblings all represented qualities which would be invaluable to Zeus in the coming war. As a result, Zeus forever honored Nike and her brothers keeping them always with him. And as such, the qualities represented by Nike and her brothers would become attributes of Zeus himself.

=== Battle against Typhon ===
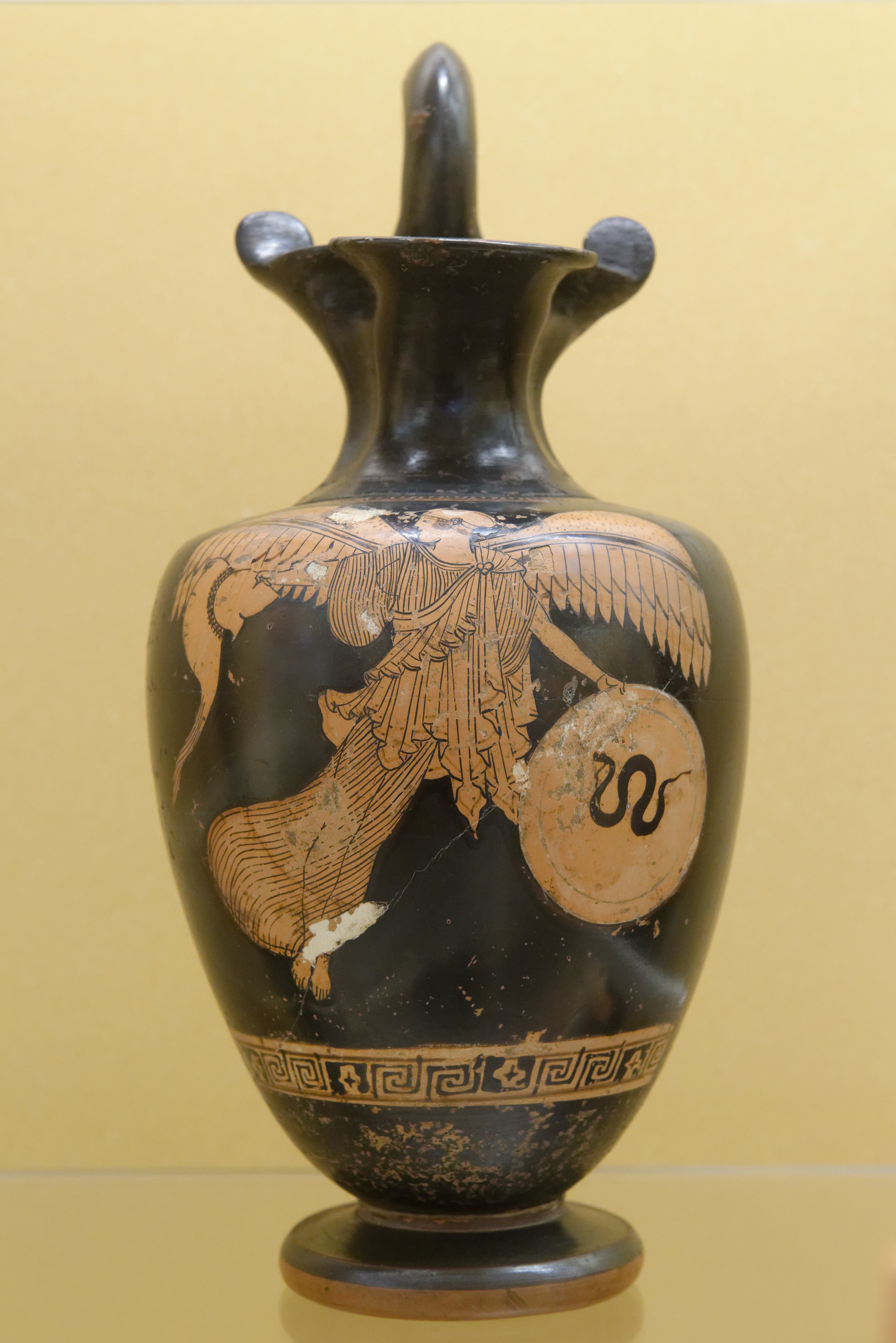
A flying Nike holding a helmet and shield; Copenhagen, National Museum of Denmark 1222 (c. 475–425).

In Nonnos' Dionysiaca, Nike comes to aid Zeus in his battle against the many snake-headed giant Typhon, who has stolen Zeus's weapons the thunderbolts and begun a concerted attack on the heavens and the seas. When Typhon discovers that Zeus has, through trickery, retrieved his thunderbolts, Typhon renews his attack, laying waste to the earth. The day ends with Typhon unchallenged, while Zeus waits through the night for the approaching dawn.

Nike, in the form of Leto, finds Zeus alone waiting in the dark and reproaches him saying:

Lord Zeus! stand up as champion of your own children! Let me never see Athena mingled with Typhon, she who knows not the way of a man with a maid! Make not a mother of the unmothered! Fight, brandish your lightning, the fiery spear of Olympos! Gather once more your clouds, lord of the rain! For the foundations of the steadfast universe are already shaking under Typhon's hands ...!

— Nonnus' Dionysiaca, translation by W. H. D. Rouse

Nike expresses here her particular concerns (as her attendant) for Athena, the motherless maiden daughter of Zeus. She goes on to tell Zeus that many gods have already given up and fled the battle including Ares, Hermes, Apollo, Aphrodite, and Hephaestus. She also reminds Zeus of the terrible consequences if Typhon were to win, mentioning again the rape and enslavement of Athena, as well as that of Zeus's other maiden daughter Artemis.

When in the morning Typhon again issued his challenge, Zeus gathered the clouds around himself for armor and answered the monster's threats. Nike leads Zeus into battle, as Eris (Strife) leads Typhon. During the fighting, Nike "lifted her shield and held it before Zeus", while Zeus, armed with "his aegis-breastplate", attacked with his thunderbolts. After a long and cataclysmic battle, Zeus is able to defeat the monster and claim victory. As the victorious Zeus rides off the battlefield in his golden chariot, Nike is "by his side" driving "her father's team with the heavenly whip".

In Hesiod's Theogony, this battle is described differently. There is no indication of Zeus being hesitant or fearful and Nike makes no appearance to encourage or aid Zeus in his battle with Typhon.

=== Athletic competitions ===
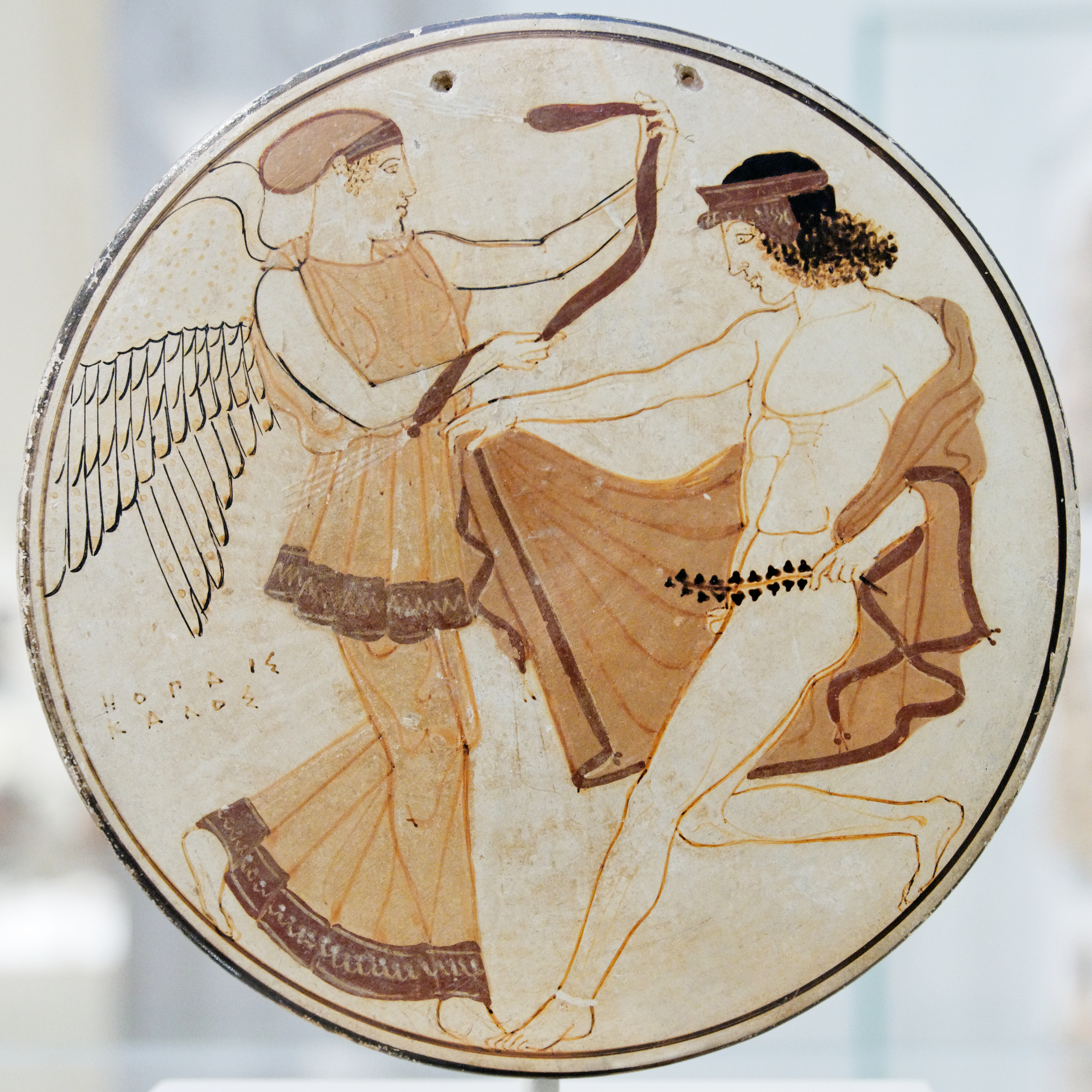
Nike moving right, holds a tainia in both hands, while a crowned youth (victorious athlete?) running to the left, holds an ivy branch in his left hand; New York, Metropolitan Museum of Art 28.167 (c. 460–450 BC).

Nike is next encountered several times in the early fifth-century BC Greek lyric poetry of Bacchylides and Pindar. Bacchylides describes Nike as the "giver of sweet gifts", and standing next to Zeus judging "the achievement of excellence (arete)" for both gods and men. For both these poets, Nike is the giver of victory in athletic contests. Pindar has the victorious athlete collapse "into Victory's arms" or fall "on the knees of golden Victory". While Bacchylides has athletes winning honor and fame "by the will of Victory", or by "glory-bringing Victory".

=== Martial contexts ===
Nike, invoked together with Zeus, could also occur in the context of war and battle. The first mention of this is by mid-fifth-century historian Herodotus. In his description of the decisive Battle of Salamis (480 BC), he quotes an oracle which supposedly had predicted the victory of the Greeks over the Persians by the agency of "Zeus and august Victory (Nike)". And the names of Zeus and Nike continued to be used together as a military invocation through at least the end of the fourth-century BC. Xenophon reports that the watchword "Zeus Saviour and Victory [Nike]" was used at the Battle of Cunaxa (401 BC), while, according to Plutarch the similar watchword "Zeus and Victory [Nike]" was used at the Battle of Ipsus (301 BC).

=== Theatrical competitions ===
Nike could also be invoked in theatrical competitions, such as Athens' City Dionysia and Lenaia. Competitors, including the late fifth-century BC tragic playwright Euripides, and the late fourth-century BC comedic playwright Menander would sometimes included appeals to Nike at the close of their plays. Euripides concludes three of his plays with the appeal:

Victory, may you have my life in your charge and never cease garlanding my head!

Three of Menander's plays contain a similar formulaic ending:

... May Victory

That merry virgin, born of noble line,

Attend us with her favour all our days!

== Cult ==
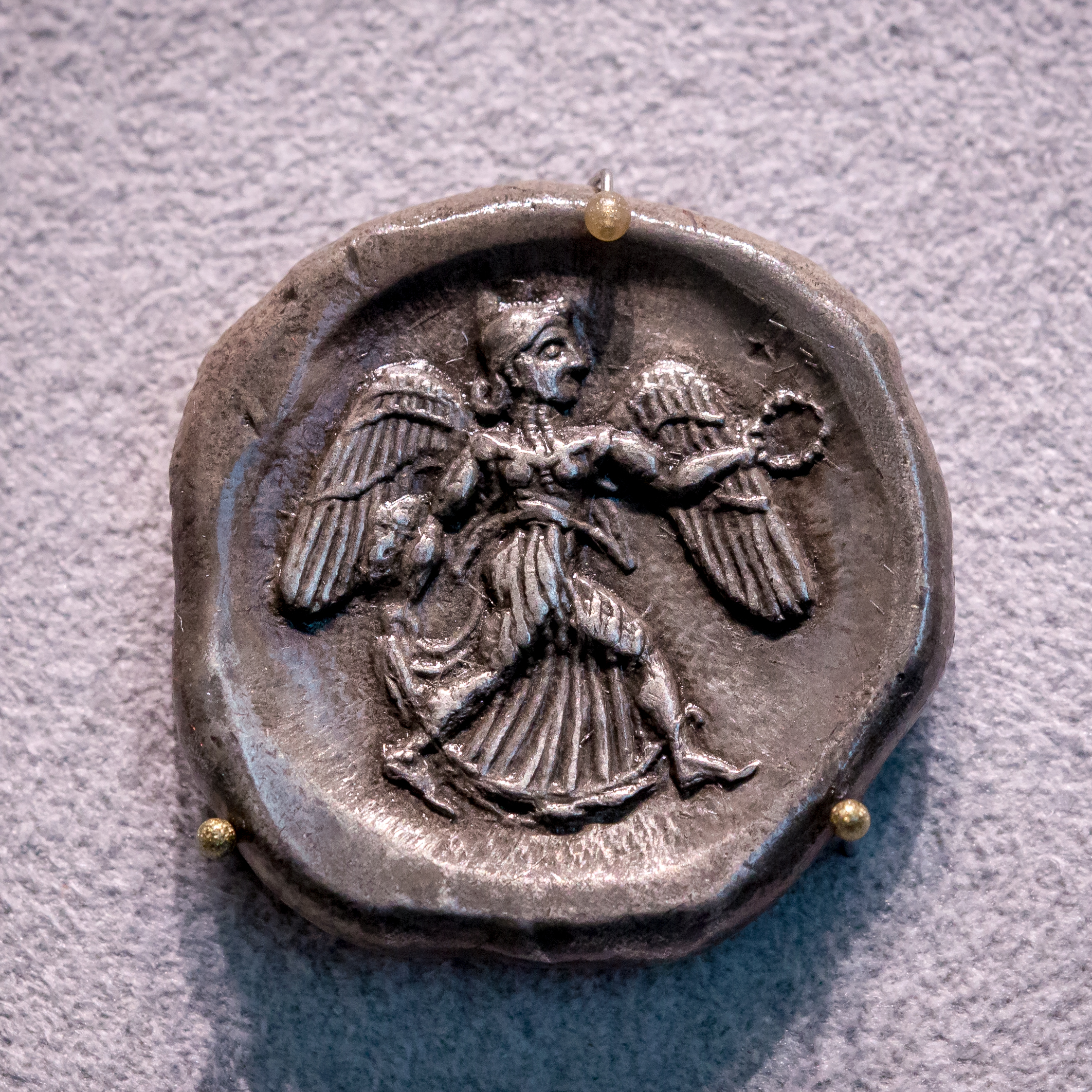
Winged Nike, wearing long chiton holding a wreath in left hand; silver stater of Elis, Berlin, Staatliche Museen 18214833 (c. 471-452 BC).

Evidence for a cult of Nike exists for several locations in Greece and Magna Graecia. The so-called "Decree of Themistocles" (the authenticity of which has been debated) mentions sacrifices offered to Zeus, Athena, Nike, and Poseidon. Vase paintings from the late Archaic show Nike in front of an altar or together with a sacrificial bull. Nike may also have been assimilated into the cult of other gods, such as Zeus at Olympia, and most prominently the cult of Athena Nike at Athens.

=== Zeus at Olympia ===
According to the geographer Pausanias there was an altar to Nike in Olympia between an altar of Zeus Katharsios ("Zeus Purifier") and Zeus Chthonios ("Zeus Underground"). From as early as 500 BC, Nike is a frequent appearance on the coinage of Elis. Such coins were minted at Olympia, and are assumed to be temple-coins. And, as such, are considered to be connected with the cult of Zeus at Olympia. The earliest of these (c. 510/490–471), show a flying eagle on the obverse, and, on the reverse, a winged Nike, wearing a long chiton, moving swiftly holding a wreathe in the hand of her outstretched arm.

=== Athena Nike ===
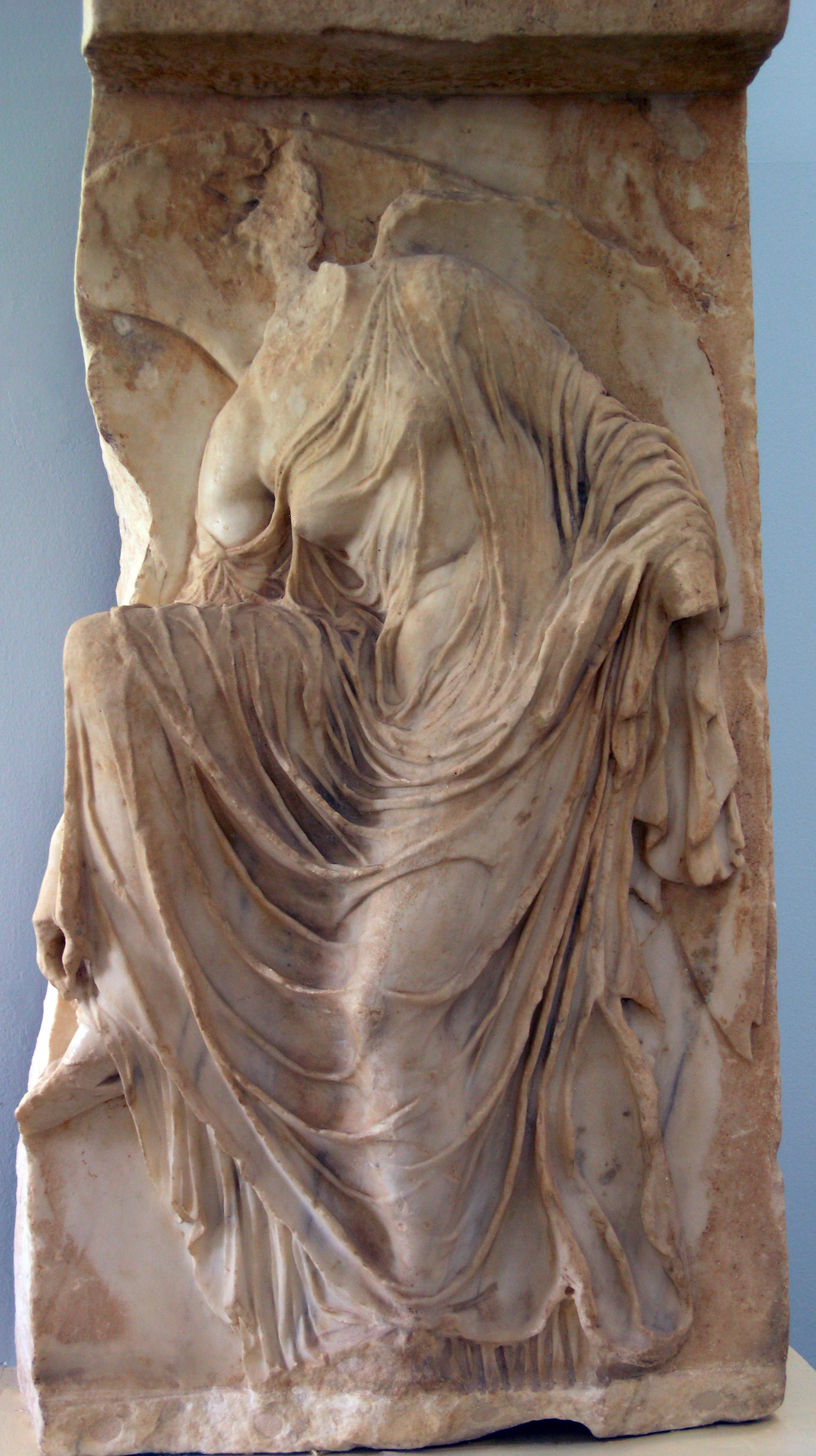
Nike Fixing her Sandal, a depiction of Nike from the south side of the parapet of the Temple of Athena Nike; Athens, Acropolis Museum 973 (c. 420 BC).

Athena Nike is a cult title of the goddess Athena, with whom Nike was closely associated and was perhaps popularly confused. The exact relationship between Nike and Athena Nike is uncertain. However, a cult title, such as Athena Nike, which joins the name of a major god with that of a more minor one known to have had their own independent cult suggests that such a fused title arose from the assimilation of an existing local cult by the major god.

Athena Nike had a sanctuary on the Acropolis of Athens from as early as the beginning of the sixth century BC. The title Athena Nike is first attested by an inscription on a block from an Archaic altar (dated 580–560 BC) found as part of the excavation and rebuilding of the southwest bastion upon which the current Classical (c. 420 BC) Temple of Athena Nike rests. This seems to have been the official title of the temple's goddess through the fifth and fourth centuries continuing into the Hellenistic period, although less formal texts, from as early as the fifth century BC, often refer to Athena Nike as simply Nike. In fact, the late fifth-century BC tragedian Euripides could refer to Athena herself as Nike.

Ancient sources refer to a cult image of Athena Nike in connection with the temple at Athens which, unlike the normally winged Nike, was wingless (apteros). Heliodorus (150 BC?) is said to have written in his book Concerning the Akropolis that the Athenians venerated a wingless statue of Nike Athena (a xoanon) which held a pomegranate in the right hand and a helmet in the left. Pausanias, writing in the second century AD, refers to the temple of Athena Nike as a temple of Nike Apteros, "Wingless Victory", which is the name he gives to an image of the goddess, without wings, which he says the Athenians had placed there. He explains that "the Athenians think that Victory, having no wings, will always remain where she is."

This cult image was part of the early sixth-century BC sanctuary which was destroyed by the Persians in 480–479 BC, although the image was preserved. It was later reinstalled inside the Classical Ionic temple which was surrounded on three sides by a sculpted parapet. Carved into the parapet, one on each of the sides of the bastion (north, west, and south), were three sets of winged Nikes (Nikai), although the remains of the parapet sculptures are fragmentary, they are thought to form three votive processions each moving toward a seated Athena. The three processions depicted Nikes, in the presence of Athena, erecting trophies and leading sacrificial bulls.

The sanctuary of the Classical Temple of Athena Nike was the most lavishly decorated of any in Athens. It was adorned with many depictions of battle and war, both historical and mythical, illustrating the subject of military victory under Athena's guidance. These sculptural themes establish that Athena Nike was worshipped as a goddess of war and the overseer of military victory by at least the fifth century BC. However, it is possible that previously she had been primarily associated with victory in Athletic competitions. The description, by Heliodorus, of the cult image holding a pomegranate suggests that, in the sixth century BC, Athena Nike was also associated with some aspect of fertility.

=== The priestess of Athena Nike ===
The earliest evidence for a priestess of Athena Nike is provided by a decree, IG I^{3} 35, passed by the Athenian Demos in third quarter of the fifth century BC. The decree orders the building of a temple and an altar stone for Athena Nike, and instituted the first "democratic priesthood", that is one that was funded by the state and with the priest or priestess (as in this case) being chosen by lot, a significant departure from Athenian tradition. The decree also orders that the priestess be paid a stipend of fifty drachmae, as well as a share of the sacrifices. A later decree, IG I^{3} 36, orders that the fifty drachmae stipend was to paid for by the kolakretai. Whether there was already a priestess of Athena Nike prior to this decree is unknown. A verse epitaph on a marble stele funerary monument (IG I^{3} 1330) names Myrrhine, daughter of Kallimachos, as "the first to serve the sanctuary (ἔδος) of Athena Nike, and, out of all, she was chosen by the luck of the draw."

== Iconography ==
In art Nike is typically portrayed as winged, wearing a long robe, and moving at great speed. Although certain identification is usually not possible in the Archaic period, figures identified as likely to be depictions of Nike appear from the early sixth century BC on vases and as freestanding sculptures or acroteria which adorned the center or ends of a pediment of a building. Nike images also appear on small bronzes (from c. 550 BC), and coins (from 510/490 BC).

Nike frequently appears in scenes depicting victorious deeds or participating in cult activities, such as victory sacrifices or the setting up of a tropaion (trophy). Although rare in the Archaic period, in the Classical and later periods, Nike can also appear as a companion or as an attribute to victory-giving deities, such as Zeus, and especially Athena.

There are so many impressive depictions of Nike that she "becomes an embodiment of Classical art".

=== Archaic period ===
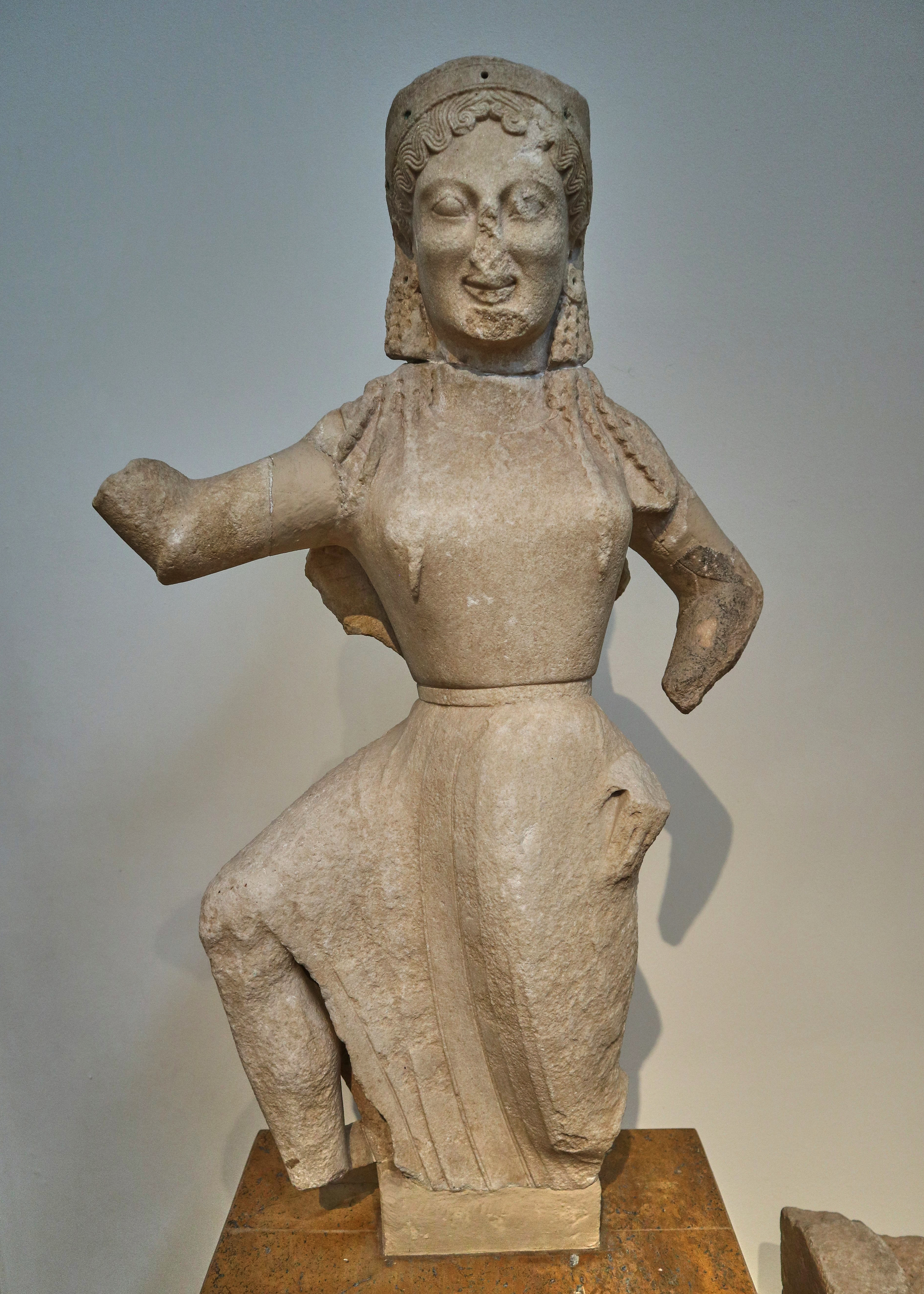
Nike of Delos (c. 550 BC). Marble sculpture of a winged Nike (wings broken off) wearing a long belted robe moving quickly to the left in knielauf (kneeling-run) pose. Found at Delos, Athens National Archaeological Museum 21.

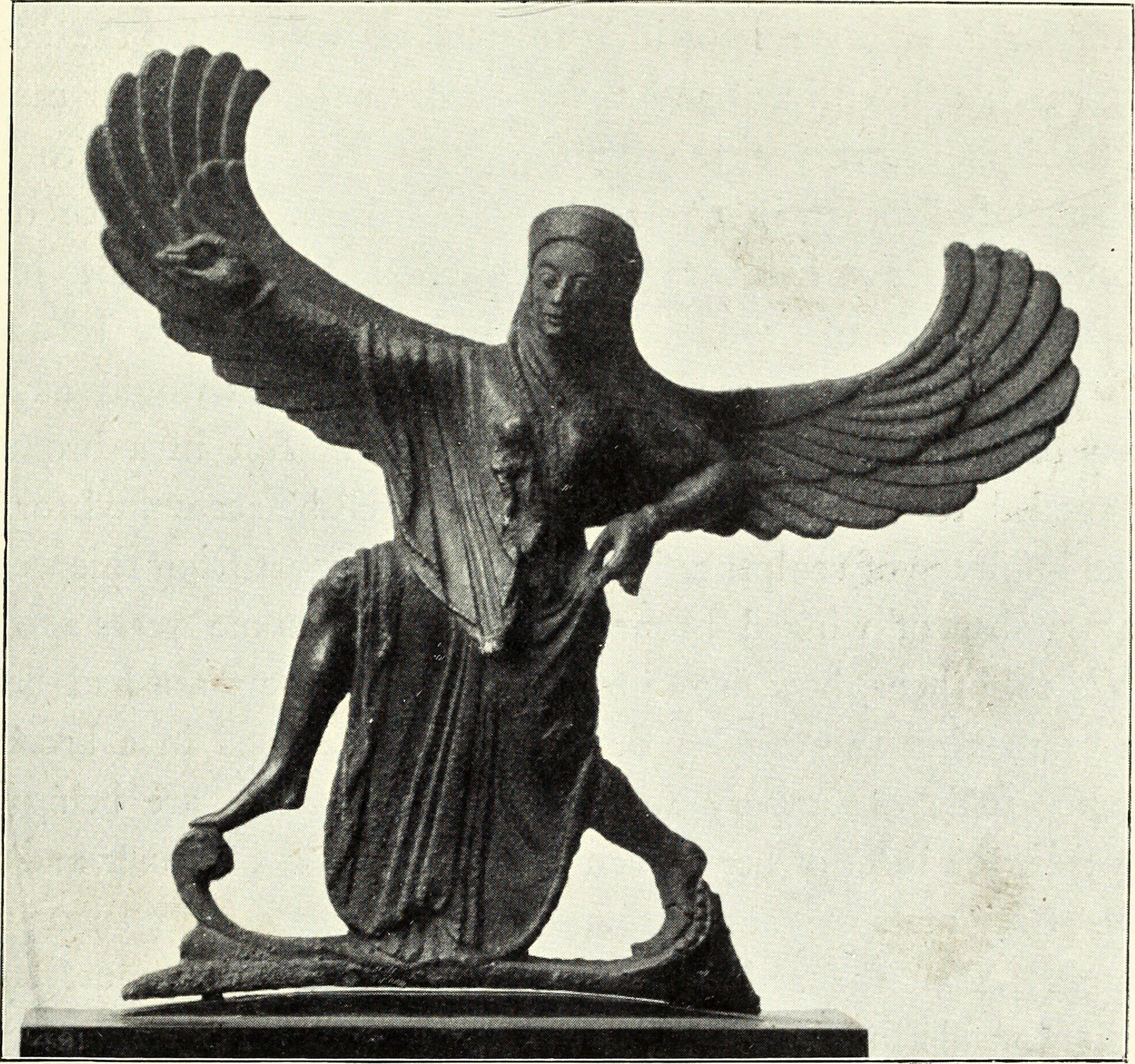
Nike moving quickly left; bronze device crown, British Museum 491 (c. 525-20 BC).

In the Archaic period, Nike does not yet have a specific fixed iconography. Consequently, she cannot always be reliably distinguished from other winged female figures, particularly the messenger-goddess Iris. Although some figures considered to be Nike are shown with a caduceus (kerykeion or herald's staff) or victory wreath, the caduceus is the primary attribute of Iris, and other winged female figures other than Nike can also be shown with wreaths.

Some early depictions of winged women have been identified as Nike based upon their juxtaposition with other images representing victory in athletic competition. Perhaps the earliest of these is found on the tondo of a Siana cup, by the C Painter, dated to the 2nd quarter of the 6th century BC. Its exterior depicts the return of a victorious athlete, while its interior depicts a winged women in the traditional knielauf (kneeling-run) pose heading right. In the Archaic period, this knielauf pose is the standard device for representing speed, and is characteristic of the figures identified as Nike. They rush off to the side, but do not look where they are going, instead they maintain direct address and engagement by turning their head to look at the viewer.

Such depictions lacking definitive attributes remain characteristic throughout the Archaic period. Nike's most important attribute, the victory wreath, gradually emerges in the second half of the sixth century BC, but remains rare. Other attributes associated with victory, the branch and tainia (head ribbon), also begin to appear in this period, while attributes associated with cultic acts, such as the phiale (libation bowl), oenochoe (wine jug), and thymiaterion (standing incense burner) appear sporadically as early as the turn of the fifth century BC.

Sculptural depictions of Nike in the Archaic period served primarily as votive offerings or dedications, and acroteria. Two of these, the Nike of Delos (c. 550 BC), attributed to Archermus, and the Nike of Callimachus (c. 480 BC), mark the beginning and the end of the period, and are considered representative. The Archermus Nike, a marble sculpture found at Delos, is generally considered the earliest sculptural Nike identified by inscription. It depicts a winged figure moving in swift flight to the left in knielauf posture. The upper torso faces frontally toward the viewer, and the head is crowned with a diadem. In the Callimachus Nike, a marble monument probably erected for the victory at Marathon (490 BC), the upper body, rather than being frontally oriented as in the Archermus Nike, is slightly turned to the right in the direction of flight, with the head looking backward. A second probably related fragment depicts a lower body in a very loose knielauf posture.

Also of significance are a collection of small bronzes that were found primarily on the Acropolis of Athens, and are associated with the cult of Athena-Nike (see above). Such bronzes typically were used as the crowns or supports for various implements.

Although Nike was already in close cultic association with Zeus and Athena, depictions of Nike in the company of these gods during the Archaic period (unlike subsequent periods) are rare. Probable examples include several amphorae (dating from c. 550 BC) which depict a small winged women, at the birth of Athena, standing (or running) beneath Zeus's throne. More frequently Nike was depicted among men in what can be interpreted as athletic or martial contexts.

=== Classical period ===
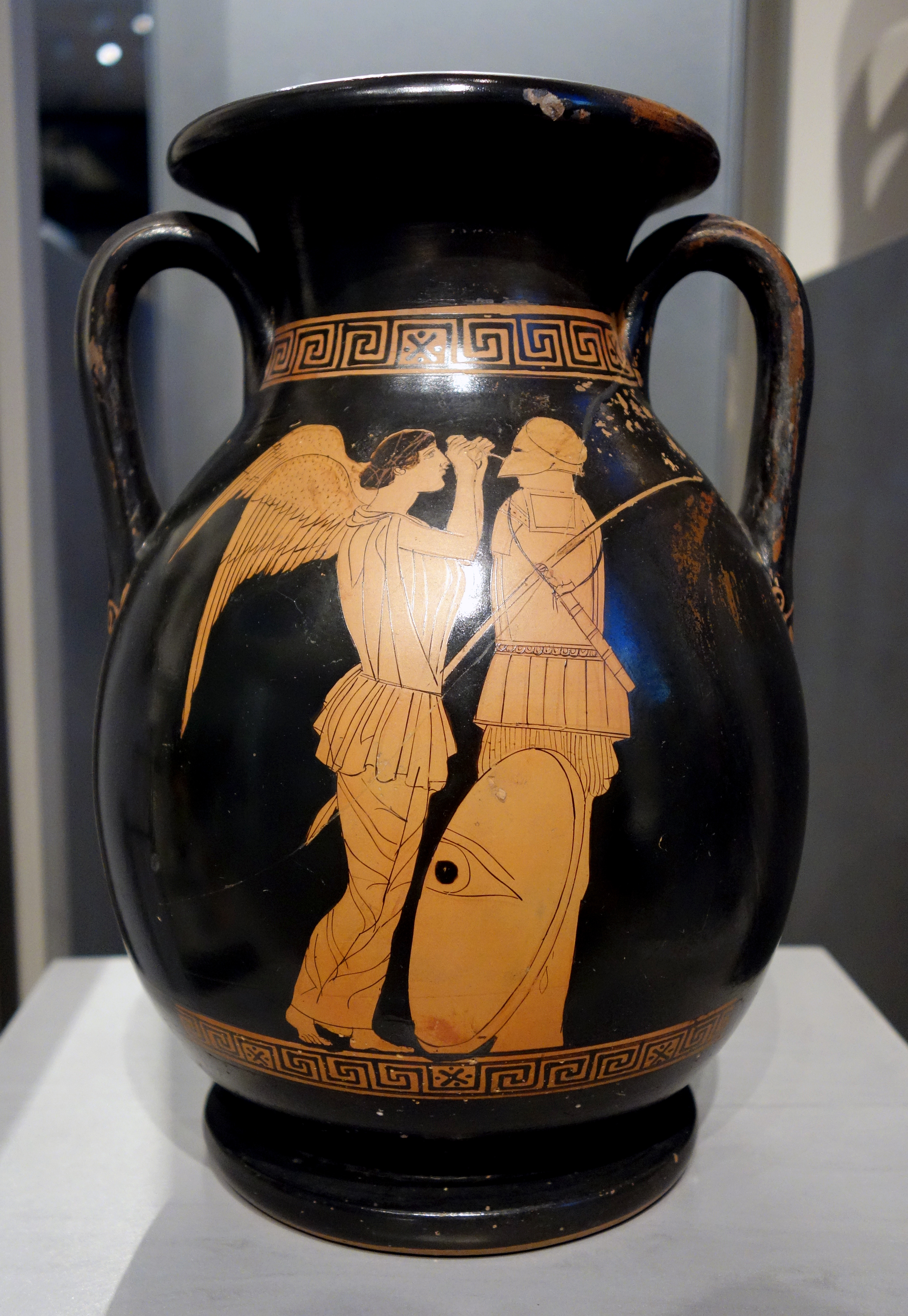
Nike fastening a helmet to a tropaion; Boston Museum of Fine Arts 1920.187 (c. 440 BC).

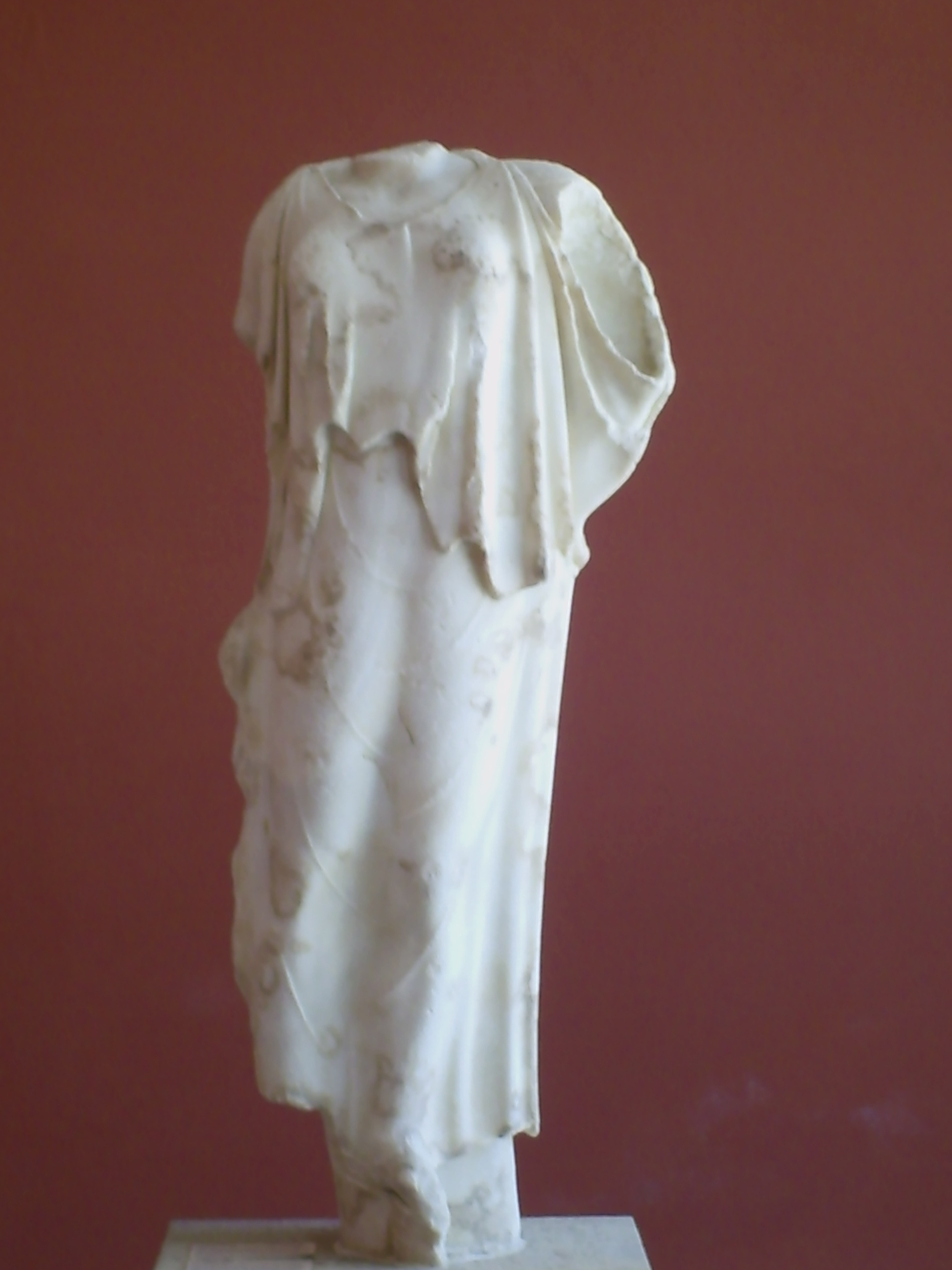
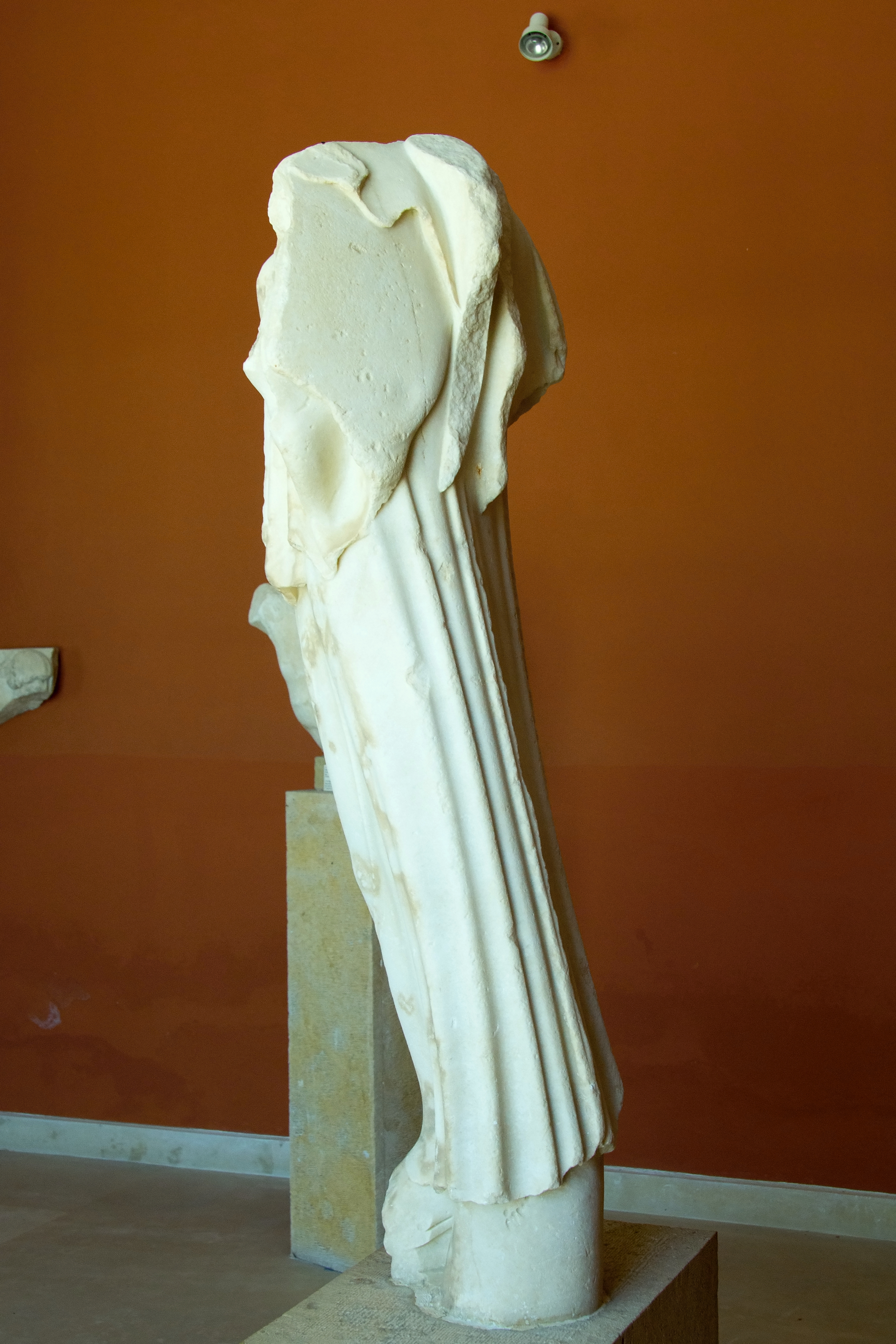
Nike of Paros, front and side views showing forward tilt; Paros, Archaeological Museum A 245 (c. 470 BC).

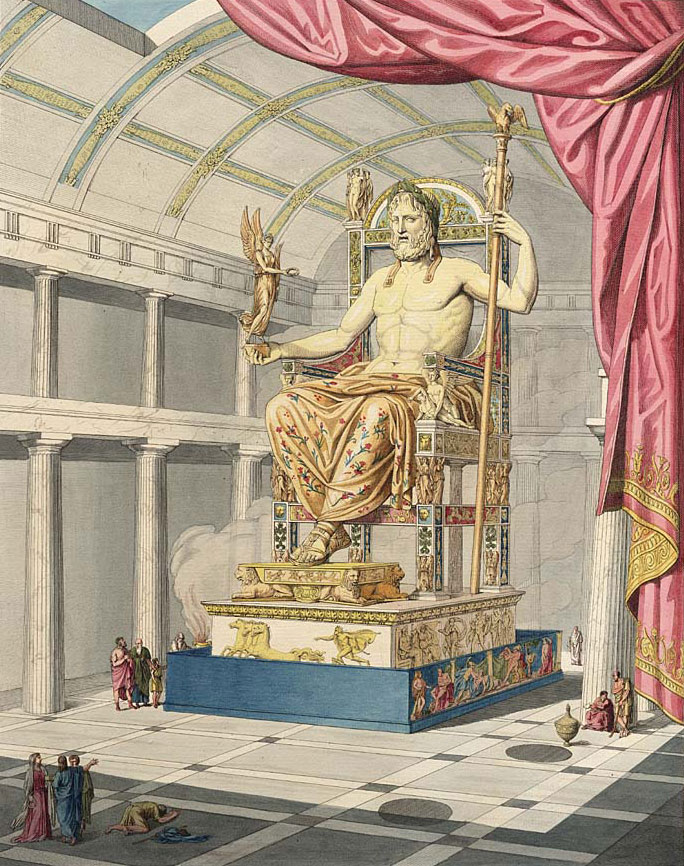
A nineteenth-century illustration by Quatremère de Quincy of what Pheidias's statue of Zeus at Olympia may have looked like.

In the Classical period, Nikes's iconography becomes fully developed. Following the battle of Marathon, Nike becomes a particularly popular subject in vase painting, where she is frequently seen with her most common attributes the phiale (libation bowl) and oenochoe (jug), often pouring a libation over an altar. She is also seen in the context of both athletic and martial victory. Other attributes which, like the bowl or jug, occur only sporadically and rarely in the Archaic period such as the wreath, branch, tainia, thymiaterion, and caduceus (see above) become common during the fifth century BC. Additional symbols of victory, such as weapons, tripods, and musical instruments, or symbols of cult, such as baskets and torches, also become common. From the 4th century BC the palm frond becomes a common attribute.

The knielauf pose, characteristic during the Archaic period, is abandoned in the Classical period in favor of more naturalistic expressions of movement and speed, and engagement with the viewer. While Archaic Nikes, serving as architectural acroteria, rush off to the left or right, arms and legs churning in pinwheel-like fashion, their Classical counterparts seem rather to move forward and downward, toward the viewer, to alight on the tops of buildings.

Because Nike is a winged figure, Classical artists tried to evoke flight and make flying a defining characteristic. One of the first sculptures to achieve this illusion of flight is the Nike of Paros (c. 470 BC), where the goddess, seemingly weightless and floating forward, barely touches the ground with just the tip of her left foot, her body tilting forward. Here the artist has dispensed with the Archaic emphasis on speed for the sake of the natural direct address of moving toward the viewer, rather than laterally. Another particularly vivid example of the evocation of flight is the Nike of Paionios at Olympia (see above). It is a Parian marble statue (c. 420 BC) by Paionios of Mende, dedicated to Zeus by the Messenians and Naupactians in celebration of a victory over the Spartans in 425 BC at the Battle of Sphacteria. Wings held high above her head, Paionios's Nike seems to swoop down. The sculptor has reintroduced the evocation of speed by having Nike's cloak, which she held with one or both outstretched arms, billow behind her like a sail, with the thin cloth covering her front pressed tightly against her body.

Popular subjects for Nike include depictions of her role as messenger of victory, erecting a tropaion (trophy), or as sacrificial servant, leading a bull to sacrifice, and, in the fifth century BC for the first time, she can be depicted in multiples like Eros. Examples of two Nikes leading a bull, or two Nikes erecting a tropaion, are among the many reliefs adorning the parapet of the Temple of Athena Nike (c. 420 BC). Another popular subject, for vase painters (especially Italian) from the second half of the fifth through the forth centuries BC, is Nike driving a chariot.

In the Classical period (unlike the Archaic) Nike is also often shown in the company of other gods, particularly Athena. Many vase paintings depict Nike standing next to Athena, as her assistant. She is depicted crowning Athena and driving Athena's chariot, and can appear in any mythical context involving Athena. While Nike is usually depicted as being the same size as the other deities in her company, she can also be shown in reduced form. A pair of small Nikes often stand on the columns flanking Athena on Panathenaic prize amphorae. On a tetradrachm from Camarina (c. 430/20-405 BC), a diminutive Nike crowns the charioteer Athena with a wreath. A small Nike crowns the newborn Athena on a marble puteal, or flies over her during Athena's contest with Poseidon for the patronage of Athens.

A diminutive Nike was also sometimes shown standing in the hand of other deities. One such example was the Statue of Zeus at Olympia (c. 435 BC) by the Greek sculptor Phidias. Pausanias describes the statue as follows:

The god sits on a throne, and he is made of gold and ivory. On his head lies a garland which is a copy of olive shoots. In his right hand he carries a Victory, which, like the statue, is of ivory and gold; she wears a ribbon and—on her head—a garland. In the left hand of the god is a scepter, ornamented with every kind of metal, and the bird sitting on the scepter is the eagle. The sandals also of the god are of gold, as is likewise his robe. On the robe are embroidered figures of animals and the flowers of the lily.

— Translation by W.H.S. Jones, and H.A. Ormerod.

Pheidias's cult statue of Athena from the Parthenon in Athens, Athena Parthenos (mid-fifth century BC), also held a smaller Nike in her right hand and a spear in the other. According to Pausanias, this Nike was roughly four cubits tall (about seventy-two inches). In contrast to the "flying" Nikes described above, these Nike apparently stood firmly on their feet.

Nike can appear in any context where victory is being alluded to, from the grand to the mundane. As part of the great mythological victory of the gods over the Giants, she can be shown driving Zeus's chariot. She is frequently depicted crowning victors, or otherwise glorifying the deeds of great heroes such as Heracles, Theseus, Achilles, and Diomedes. She appears in scenes involving war, warriors, and armed combat, however, she is equally at home in the context of agonistic victory such as that of athletic, musical, literary, or theatrical competitions, as well as the simple victories of everyday life.

=== Hellenistic period ===
Alexander the Great (r. 336–323 BC) made use of Nike as a symbol of state power and military strength. A standing Nike holding a wreath in her right hand was shown on the reverse of gold staters issued by Alexander. This same coin image, with slight modifications, was repeatedly used in Magna Graecia and Asia Minor until the beginning of the Roman Imperial period. Alexander's successor Diadochi, used this same image only briefly before introducing new motifs. For example, on coins (and gems), a diminutive Nike stands on the hand of an enthroned Zeus or Athena.

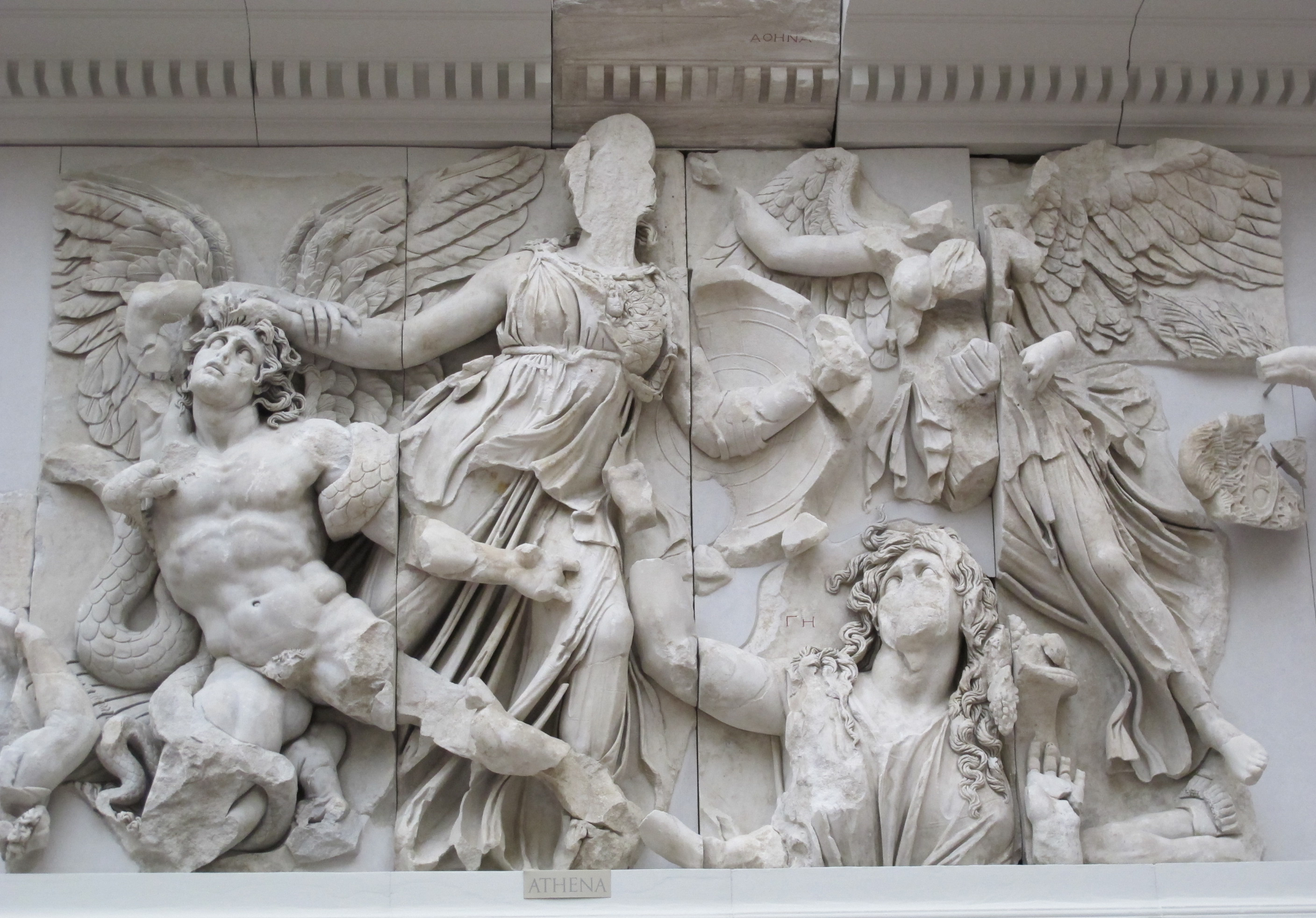
Nike crowning a victorious Athena, Gigantomachy frieze from the Pergamon Altar, Berlin.

Several examples, from as early as the third century BC, depict Nike striding forward on the prow of a ship, perhaps reflecting the increasing importance of naval battles during the wars between the Diadochi. Coins of the Macedonian king Demetrios Poliorketes (r. 301–285), depict such a striding Nike blowing into a military trumpet (salpinx). The Nike of Samothrace ("Winged victory"), a masterpiece of Hellenistic sculpture, also shows such a Nike on the prow of a warship. It was set up, in the Sanctuary of the Great Gods on the island of Samothrace, probably as a dedication after a naval victory.

Nike is depicted on the second-century BC Pergamon Altar alongside Athena in the Gigantomachy, the war of the gods against the Giants. On the right side of the East frieze, Athena grabs a winged Giant (usually identified as Alcyoneus) by the hair. Below and to the right of Athena, the giant's mother Gaia rises from the ground, touching Athena's robe in supplication. Above Gaia, a winged Nike flies in to crown the victorious Athena.

== Gallery ==
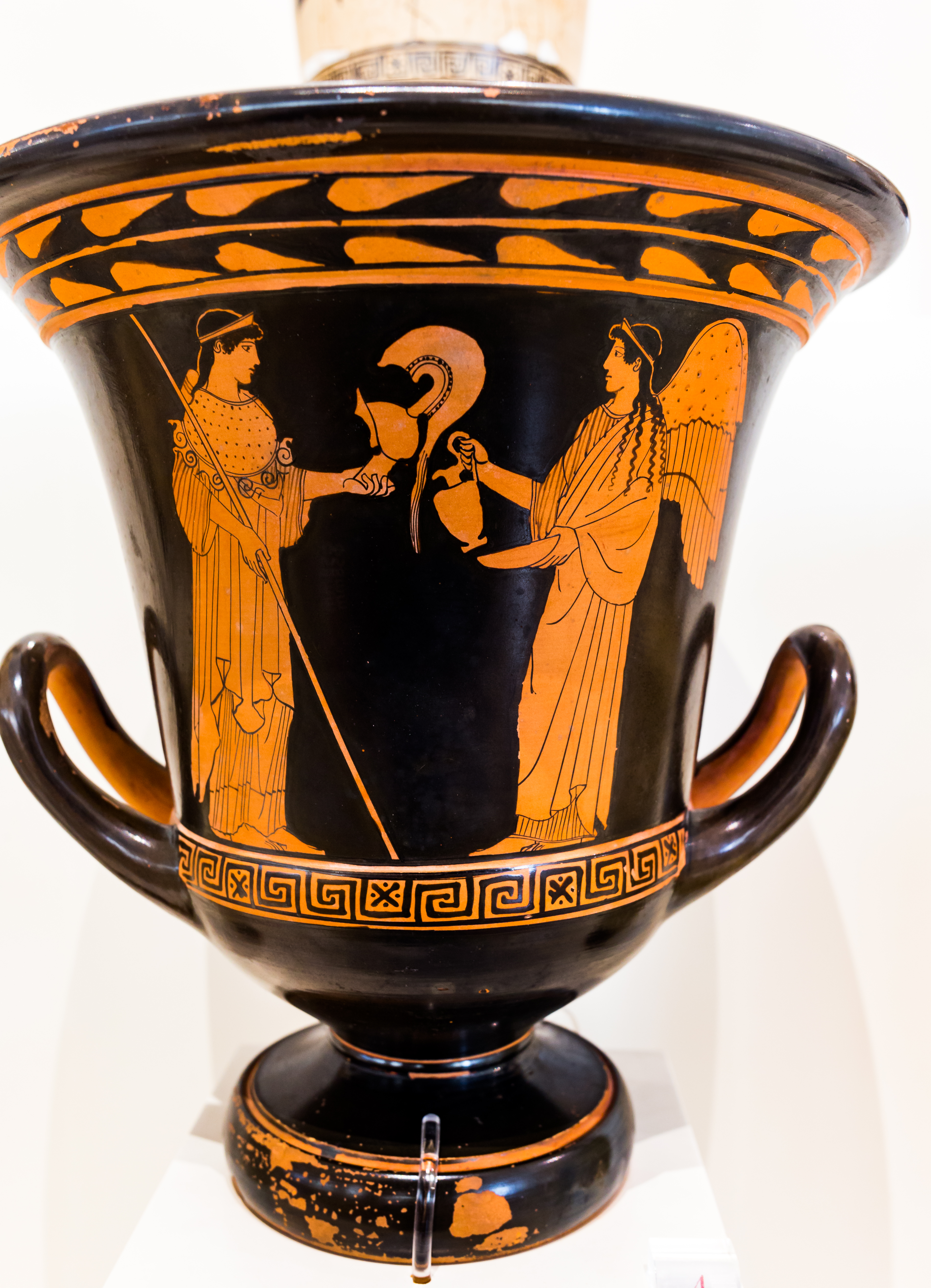
Athena (left) holding Helmet and spear with a winged Nike holding a oenochoe (wine jug); Athens, National Archaeological Museum 1717 (c. 475–425).

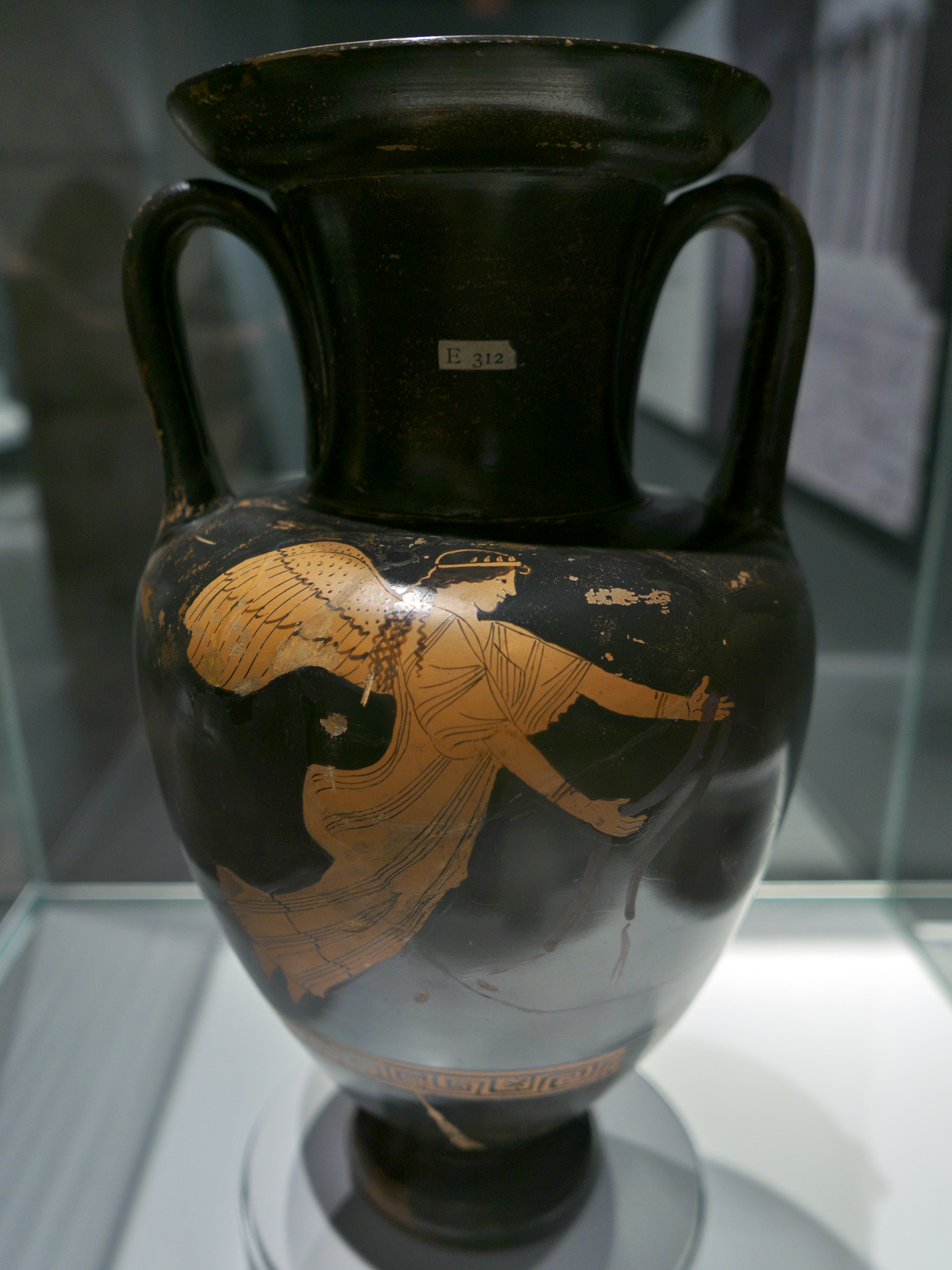
A flying Nike holding out a tainia in both hands (on the opposite side of the vase a victor with wreaths and tainias); neck-amphora, London, British Museum E312 (c. 500–450 BC).

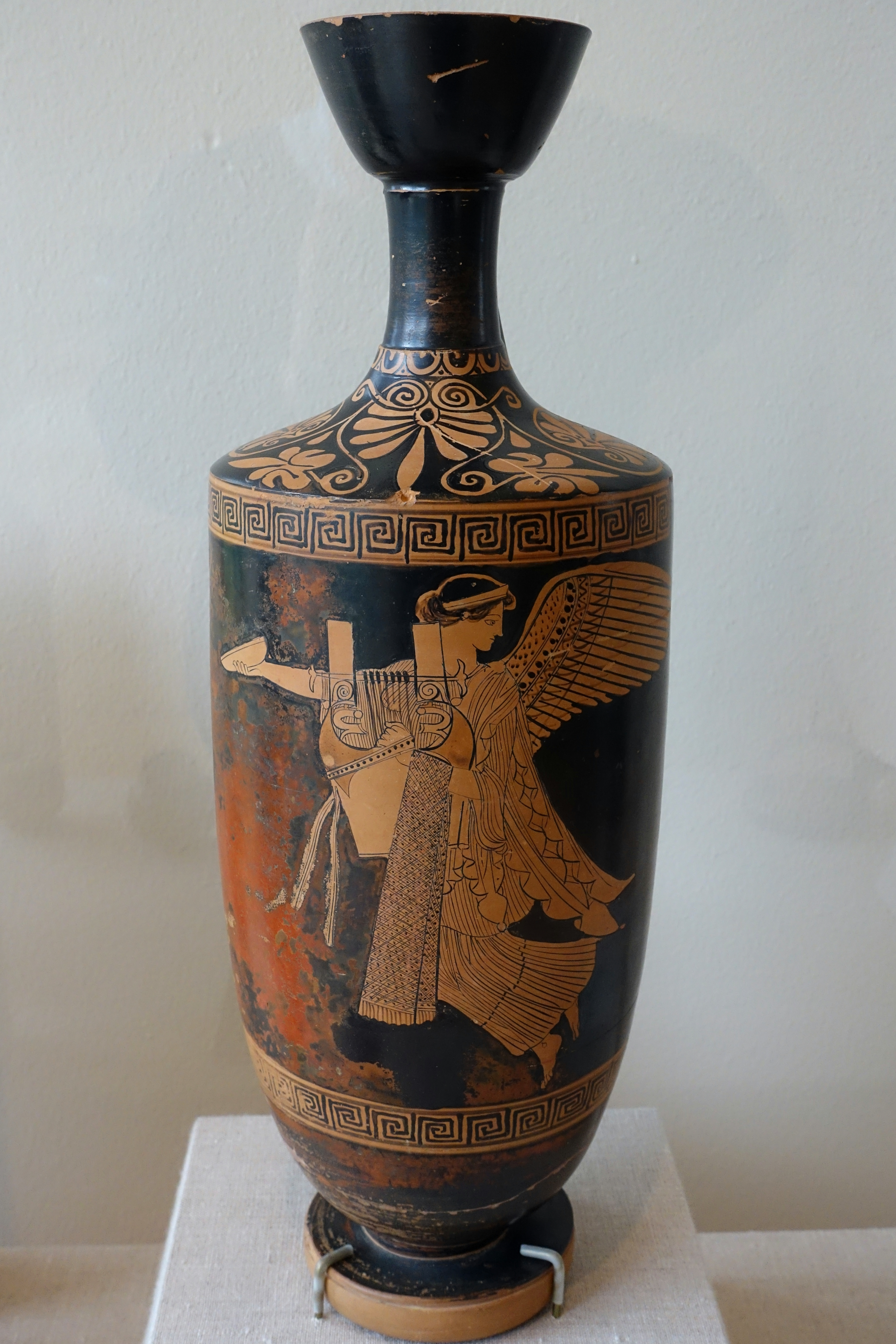
A flying Nike with phiale and kithara; lekythos, Austin, Blanton Museum of Art 1980.63 (c. 500–450).

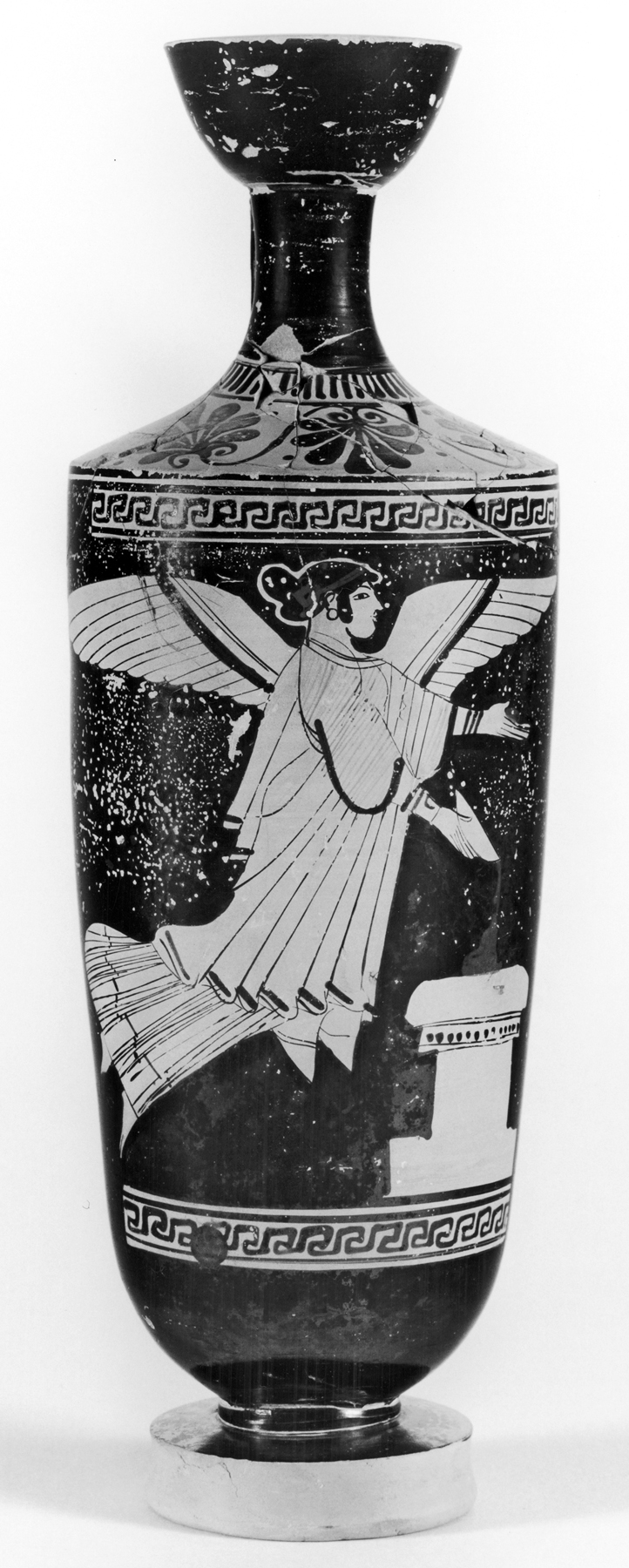
A flying Nike pouring liquid, from a phiale in her right hand, onto an altar; lekythos, Baltimore, Walters Art Museum 48.257 (c. 475–425 BC).

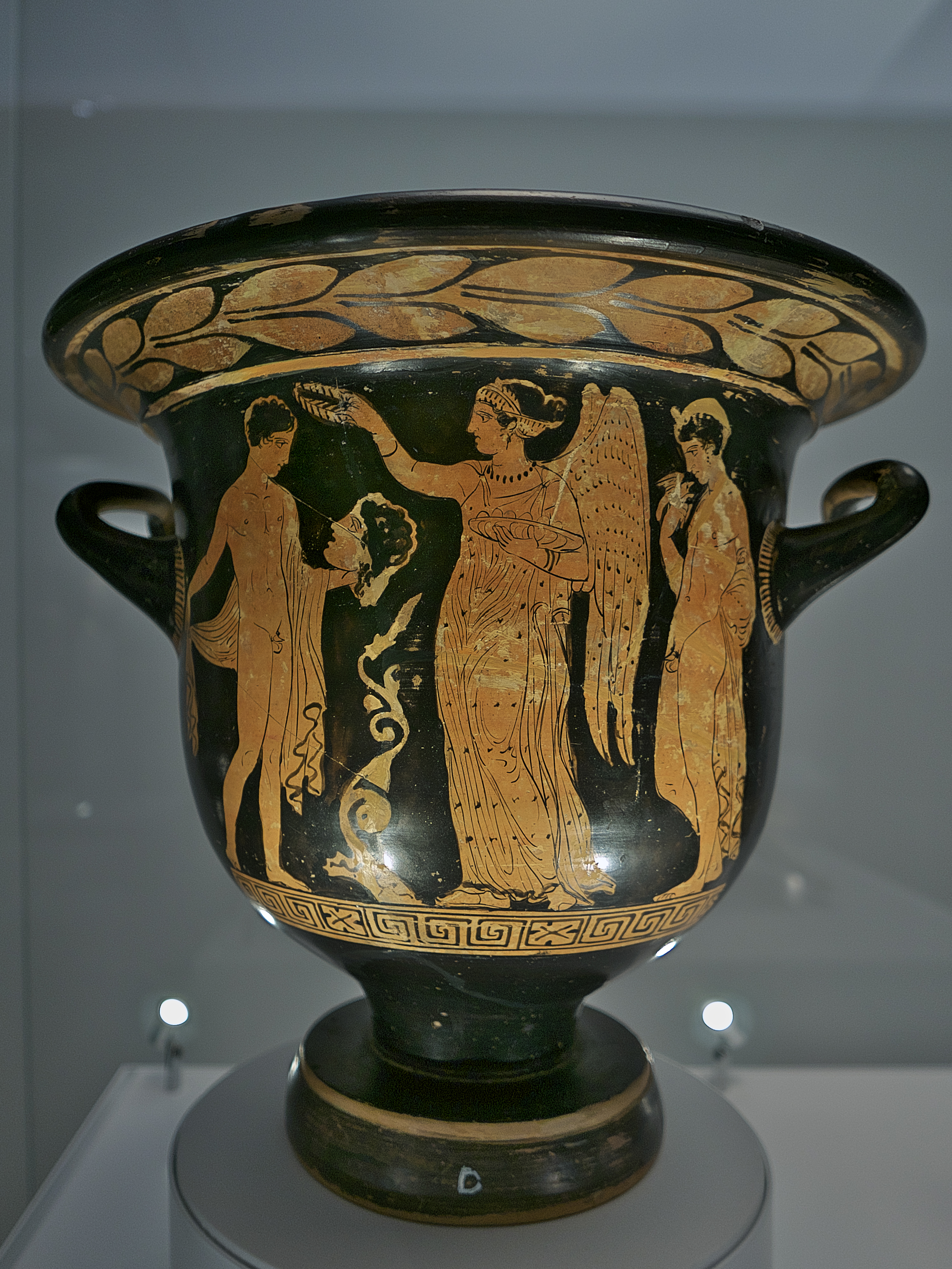
Nike, holding a phiale in her left hand, with her right hand crowns a young man (actor?) holding a female mask, bell krater, London, British Museum F163 (c. 400-380 BC).

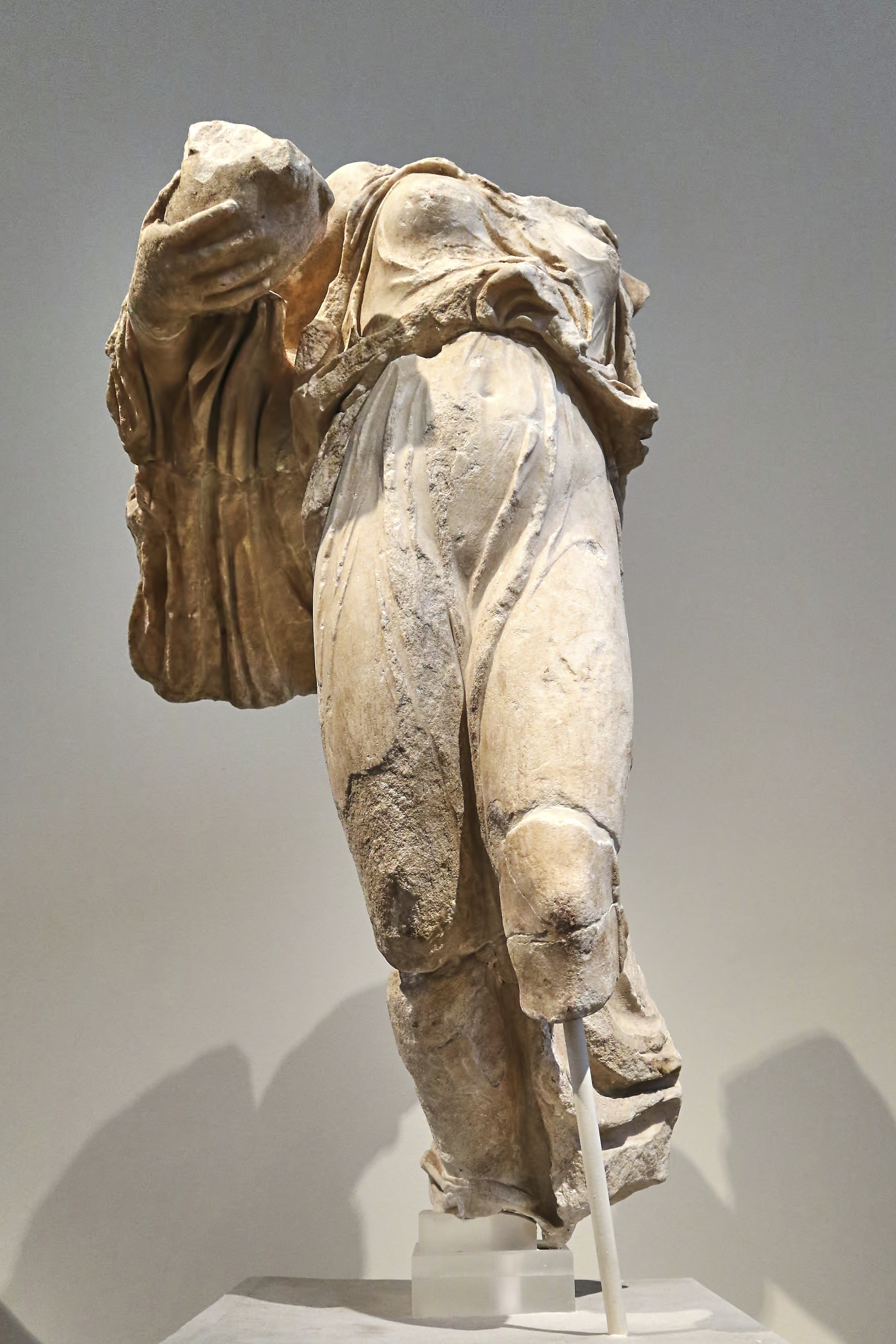
Nike statuette, the central akroterion on the west pediment of the temple of Asclepius in Epidaurus; marble, H. 2' 9" (0.85 m), Athens, National Archaeological Museum 155 (c. 380-370 BC).

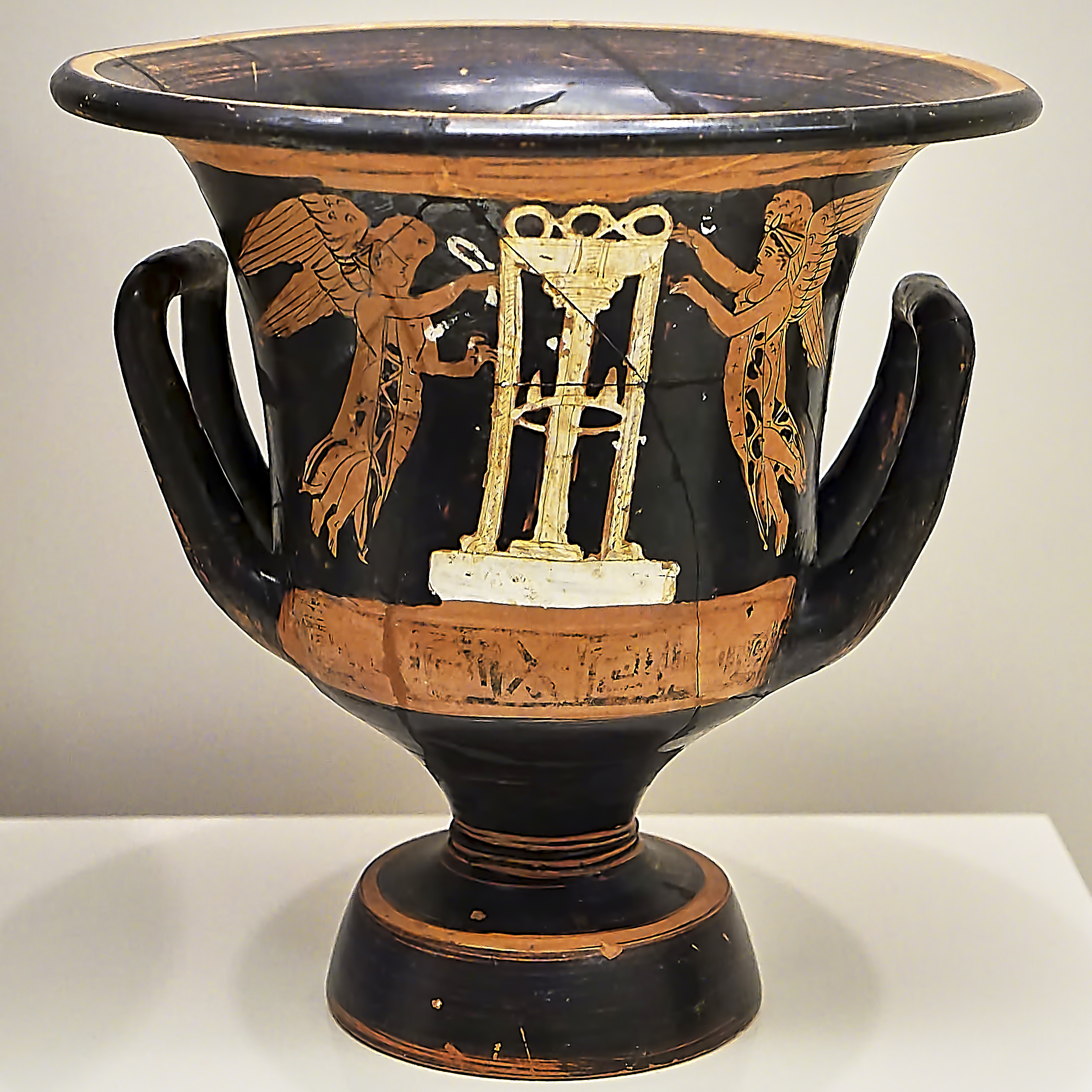
Two flying Nikes each holding a tainia in both hands on either side of a victory tripod, calyx krater, Athens, National Archaeological Museum 13900 (fourth century BC).

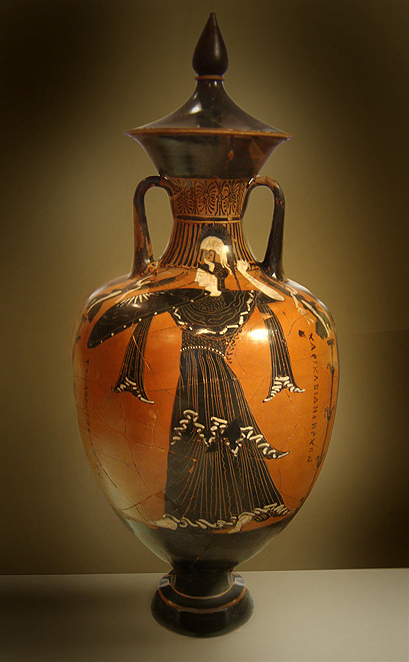
Two small Nikes flank Athena on a Panathenaic amphora from Eretria; Athens, National Archaeological Museum 20048 (363/62 BC).

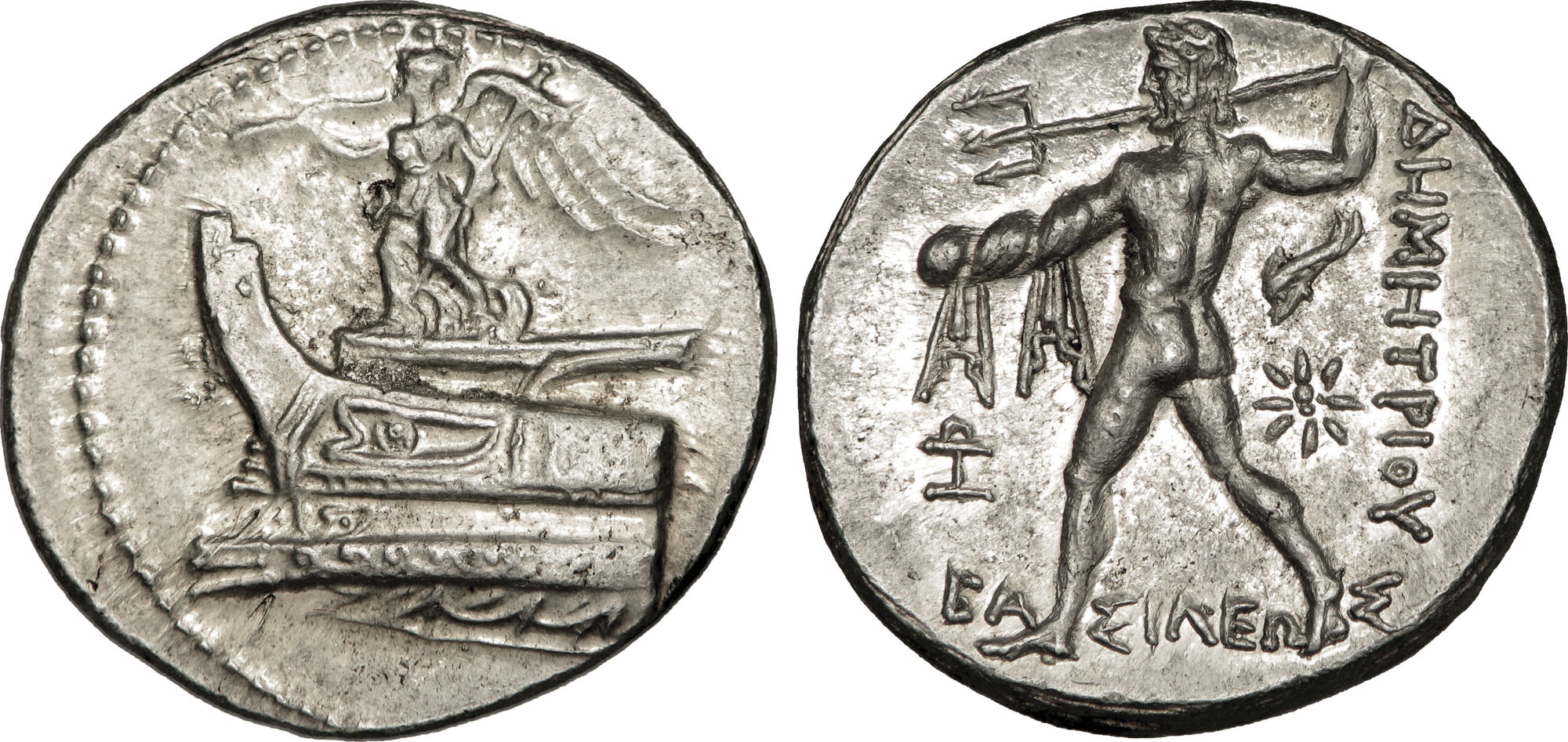
Tetradrachm of Demetrios Poliorketes (r. 301–285). Obverse: Nike on the prow of a ship; reverse: Poseidon.

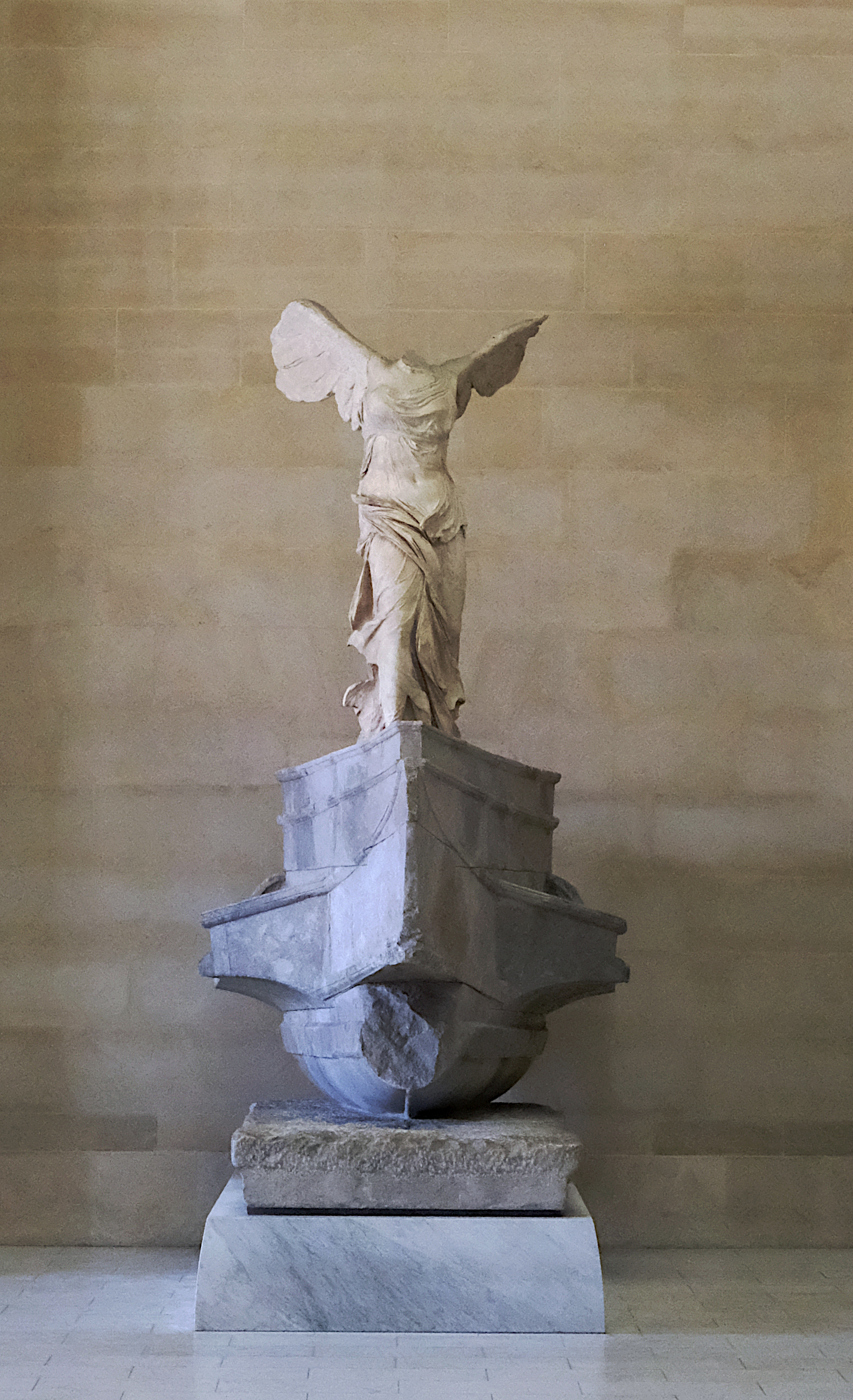
Nike of Samothrace, Paris, Louvre.

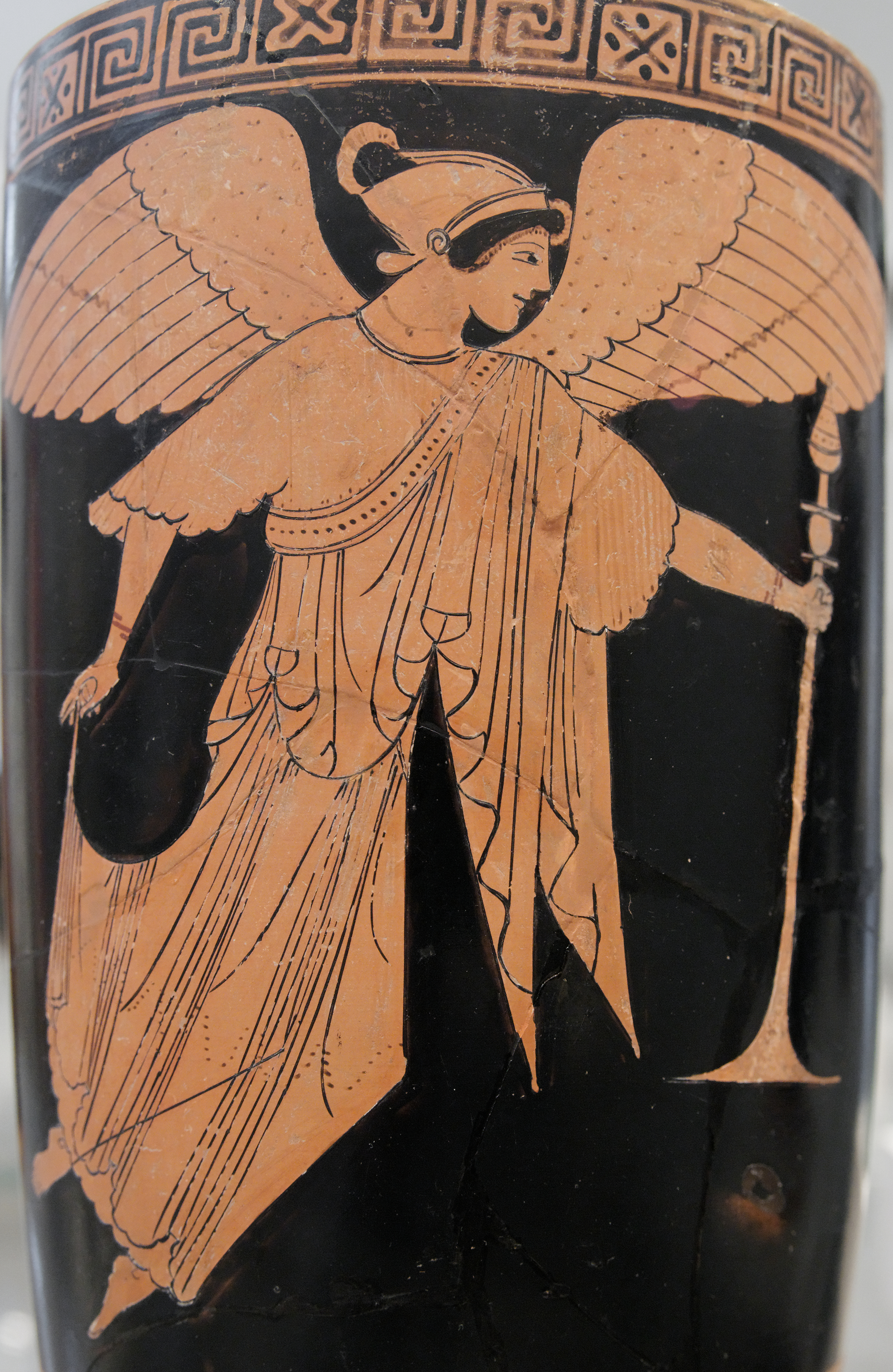
Nike holding a thymiaterion (incense burner); lekythos, Metropolitan Museum of Art 13.227.16 (c. 490 BC).

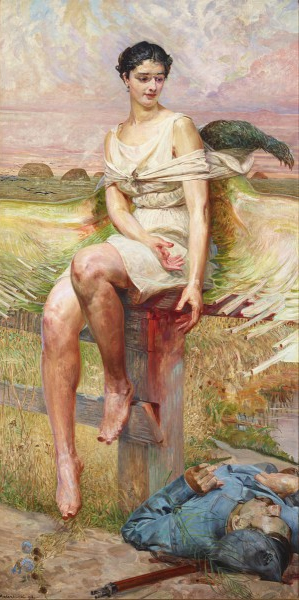
20th century depiction of Nike, Nike of the Legions (1916) by Polish artist Jacek Malczewski

== See also ==
- Ángel de la Independencia
- Goddess of Victory: Nikke, named after the goddess
