= Nikiforenko =

Nikiforenko (Russian or Ukrainian: Никифоренко, Belarusian: Нікіфарэнка) is a gender-neutral Slavic surname, a Russified variant of the Ukrainian surname Nechyporenko. Notable people with the surname include:

- Artūrs Ņikiforenko (born 1992), Latvian judoka
- Oleg Nikiforenko (born 2001), Belarusian footballer
- Syarhey Nikifarenka (born 1978), Belarusian football player

== See also ==
- Nechyporuk
- Nikiforov
