= Nikifor (given name) =

Nikifor is a Slavic personal name derived from the Greek name Nikephoros, (Νικηφόρος), "Bringer of Victory". Belarusian forms: Nichypar, Nikifar; Russian: Nikifor; Ukrainian: Nechypir , Nychypir, Nykyfor; Romanian (both given name and surname): Nichifor, Nechifor.

Patronymic surnames Nechyporuk, Nechyporenko, Nichiporovich, Nikiforov are derived from the name.

Notable people with the surname include:

- Nikifor (1895–1968), Lemko painter
- Nikifor Begichev, a Russian Arctic explorer
- Nykyfor Hryhoriv, a Ukrainian guerrilla fighter
- Nikifor Krylov, a Russian artist
