= Nichifor =

Nichifor, also Nechifor is a Romanian given name and surname derived from the Greek name Nikephoros, (Νικηφόρος), "Bringer of Victory". Notable people with the name include:

- Nichifor Crainic, Romanian writer, editor, philosopher, poet and theologian
- Nichifor Tarara, Romanian sprint canoer
- Șerban Nichifor, Romanian composer, cellist and music educator

== See also ==
- Nikifor
