= Nikolaos Vorvolakos =

- Native name: Νικόλαος Βορβολάκος
- Born: c. 1931; Mani, Second Hellenic Republic
- Died: 17 April 2014
- Allegiance: Kingdom of Greece; (Greece) Third Hellenic Republic; Republic of Cyprus
- Service / branch: Hellenic Army; Cypriot National Guard
- Rank: Lieutenant General
- Commands: Head of Cypriot National Guard

Nikolaos Vorvolakos (Greek: Νικόλαος Βορβολάκος, 1931 – 17 April 2014) was a Hellenic Army officer who served as head of the Cypriot National Guard from February 1993 to April 1998.

Born in Mani Peninsula, he graduated from the Hellenic Military Academy as a tank officer. He was dismissed from the army by the Greek military junta of 1967–74, during which time he studied and achieved a degree in architecture. He was reinstated in 1975 after the junta's fall, and in 1993, with the rank of Lt. General, was appointed as head of the Cypriot National Guard. During his tenure until April 1998, he was distinguished for his efforts in increasing the combat ability of the National Guard and in implementing the new common defense doctrine between Greece and Cyprus, adopted in 1993, with the inception of the Nikiforos–Toxotis common exercises and the visits of Greek aircraft and naval units to Cypriot military facilities.

General Vorvolakos died on 17 April 2014. He was married and had three sons.
