= Nechyporenko =

Nechyporenko/Nechiporenko (Ukrainian: Нечипоренко), also Nychyporenko/Nichiporenko (Ukrainian: Ничипоренко), is a Ukrainian surname. It is a patronymic surname derived from the given name Nechypir/Nichypir of Greek orinin (Νικηφόρος, Nikephoros). Other transliterations include Nečiporenko and Ničiporenko. Notable people with the surname include:

Notable people with the surname or one of its variants:

- Anastasiya Nychyporenko (born 1995), Ukrainian-Moldovan biathlete
- Denys Nechyporenko (born 1990), Ukrainian athlete
- Oleg Nechiporenko (born 1932), Soviet intelligence operative

== See also ==
- Nechyporuk
- Nikiforenko
- Nikiforov
