= Nicéphore =

Nicéphore may refer to:

- Nicéphore Niépce (1765–1833), French inventor, most noted as the inventor of photography and a pioneer in the field
- Nicéphore Soglo (born 1934), Beninese politician who was Prime Minister of Benin 1990–1991 and President 1991–1996
- St-Nicéphore, Quebec, former municipality that has become a sector of Drummondville in the Centre-du-Québec region of Quebec

== See also ==
- Nikephoros (disambiguation)
