= Nikephoros (disambiguation) =

Nikephoros is a Greek given name.

Nikephoros, Nikiforos or Nicephorus may also refer to:

- Athena Nikephoros, the Goddess Athena of Victory
- Nikiforos, a municipal unit in Drama regional unit, Greece
- Nikiforos Fokas, a municipal unit in Rethymno regional unit, Greece
- MV Nikiforos, a cargo ship
- Nikiforos–Toxotis, a regular military exercise by the Cypriot and Greek militaries
- Nicephorus (fly), a genus of fly.

== See also ==
- Nikifor (given name)
