= Nechyporuk =

Nechyporuk (Ukrainian: Нечипорук) is a Ukrainian patronymic surname derived from the given name Nechypir of Greek orinin (Νικηφόρος, Nikephoros). Notable people with the surname include:

- Larissa Netšeporuk (born 1970), Estonian-Ukrainian athlete
- Mykola Nechyporuk (1952–2025), Ukrainian scientist
- Volodymyr Nechyporuk (born 1949), Ukrainian politician

== See also ==
- Nechyporenko
- Nichiporovich
- Nikiforov
- Sergio Nichiporuk
