= Knielauf =

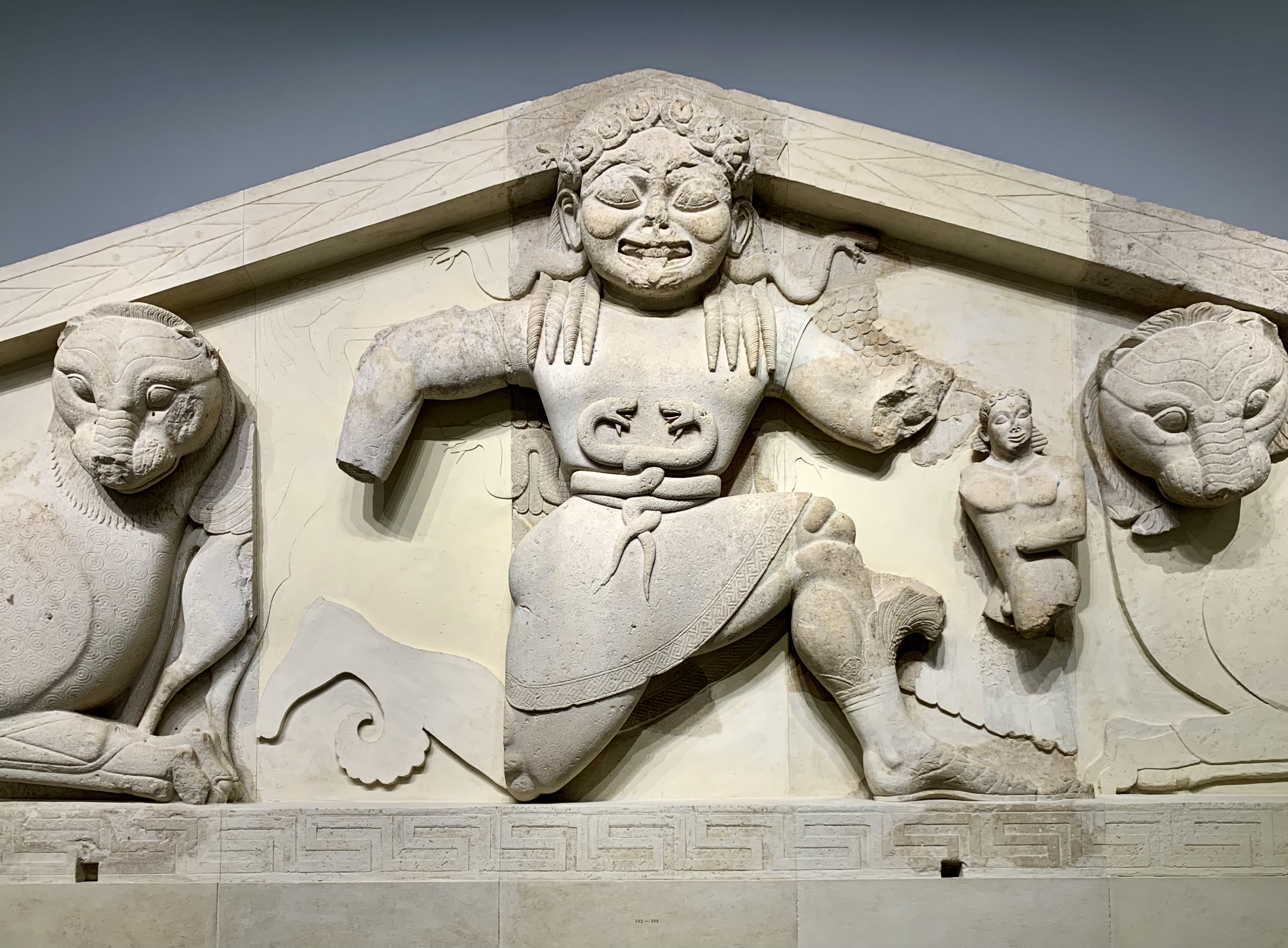
Medusa in Knielauf-pose on the Temple of Artemis (Corfu), c. 580 BC.

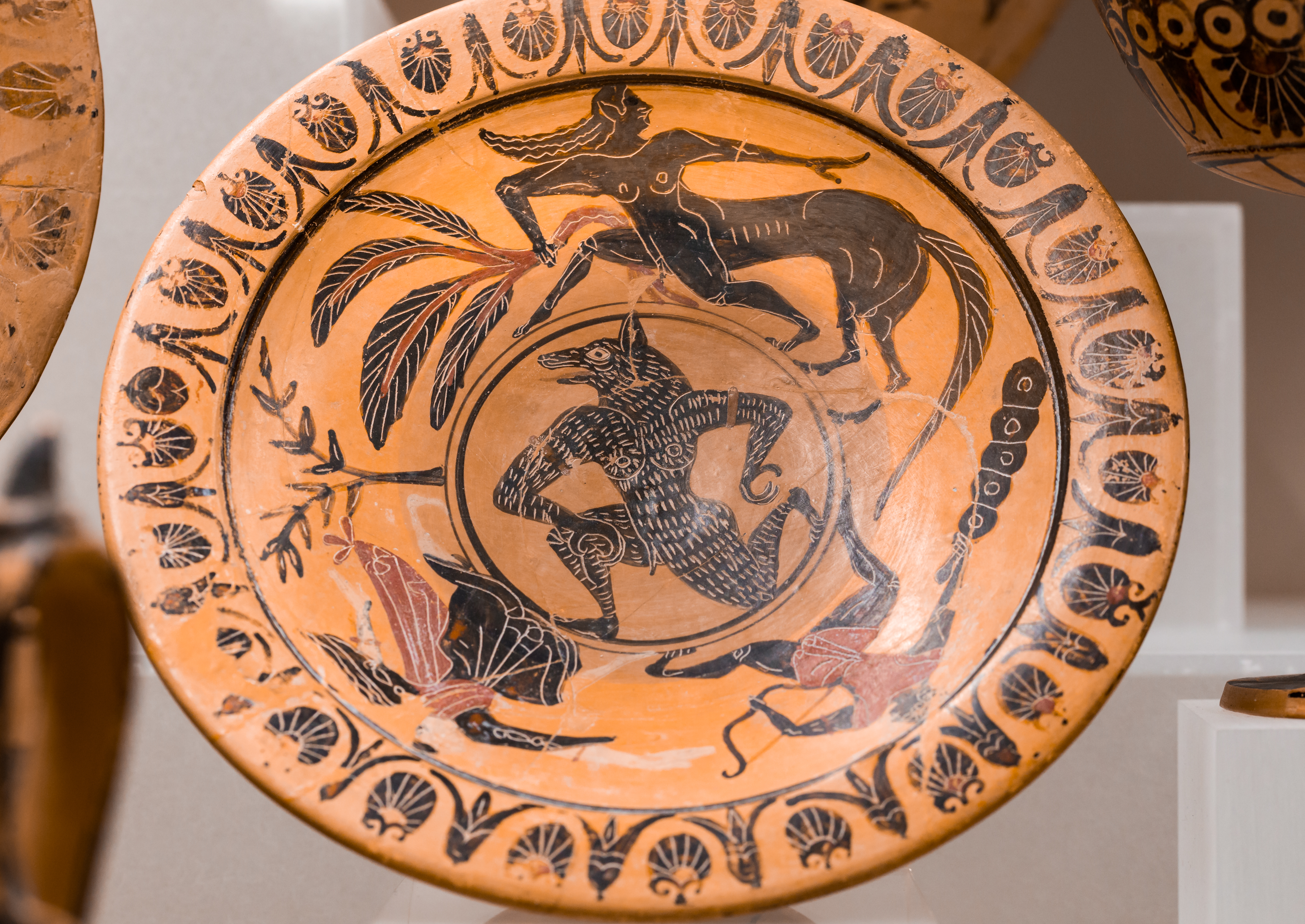
A sixth-century Etruscan example by the Tityos Painter of a dog-headed figure performing a Knielauf, surrounded by Nessos and Herakles.

Knielauf (German: [ˈkniː.laʊ̯f]) is a term of art referring to a characteristic visual motif found in the art of Ancient Greece and the Etruscans of the Archaic Period, in which a person is portrayed as running or speeding forth with one knee nearly touching the ground. It is particularly common in depictions of Gorgons. The word is borrowed from German (Knie meaning "knee", and Lauf meaning "run").
