= Nicator (disambiguation) =

Nicator is a genus of songbird endemic to Africa. It can also refer to:

- the Hellenistic title Nicator or Nikator (Νικάτωρ, lit. 'victor'), borne by:
  - Seleucus I Nicator, general of Alexander the Great and founder of the Seleucid empire
  - Demetrius II Nicator, king of the Seleucid empire
  - Amyntas Nikator, Indo-Greek king
  - Antiochus Nikator, Greco-Bactrian king
- HMS Nictator (1916), M-class destroyer during World War I
- HMS Nicator (J457), cancelled Algerine-class minesweeper during World War II
