= Thymiaterion =

Type of incense burner

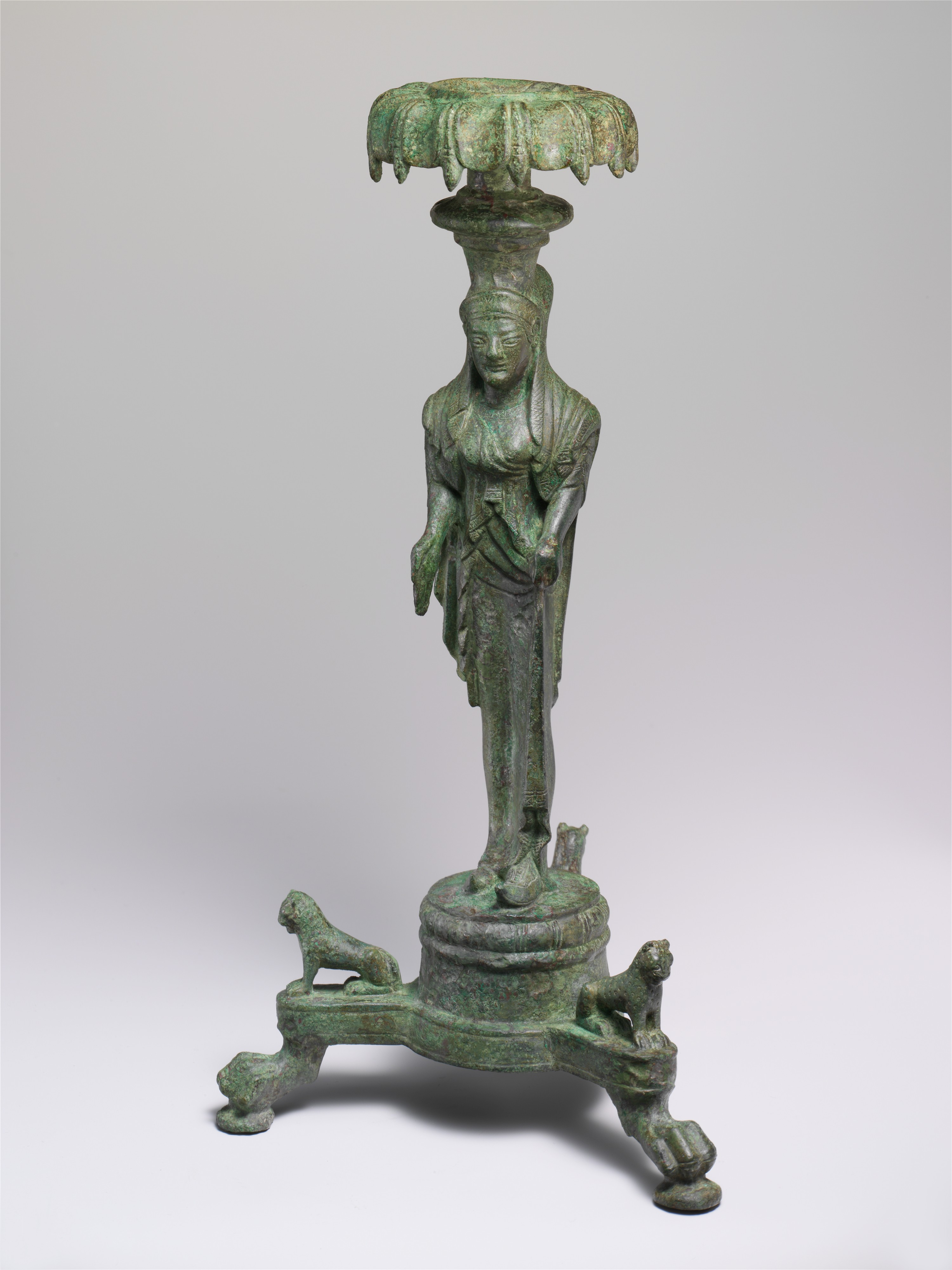
Etruscan bronze thymiaterion (late 6th–early 5th century BCE, Metropolitan Museum, New York

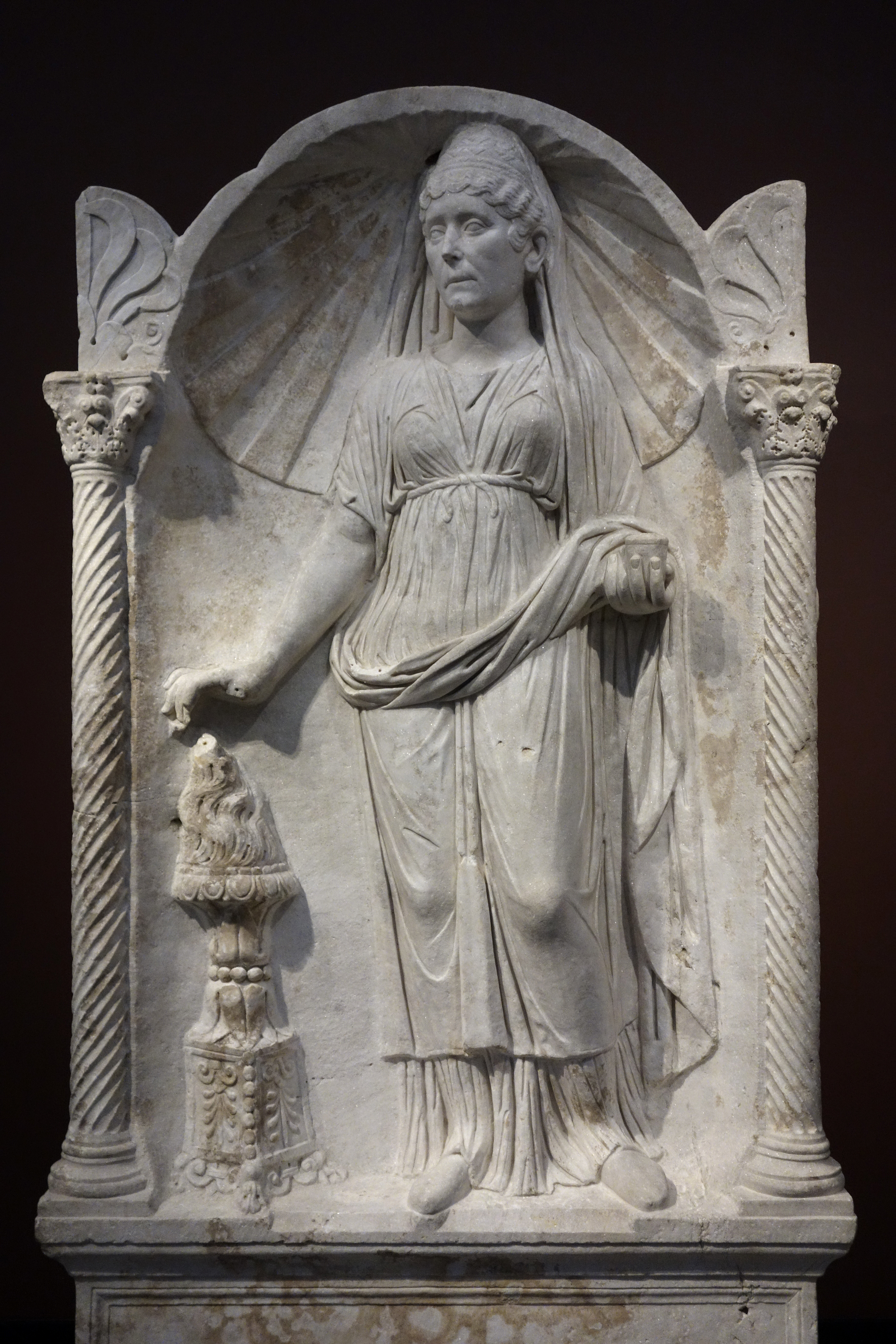
A woman sprinkles incense on a thymiaterion (Roman funerary altar, 2nd century CE, Skulpturensammlung, Dresden))

A thymiaterion (from Ancient Greek: θυμιατήριον from θυμιάειν thymiaein "to smoke"; plural thymiateria) is a type of censer or incense burner. Thymiateria have been used in the Mediterranean region since antiquity for spiritual and religious purposes and especially in religious ceremonies.

The first mention of thymiateria is found in Herodotus's Historia. They were used for rituals, including temple rituals, weddings, and funerals, in ancient Greece as early as the 6th century BC. Thymiateria could take a wide variety of forms, ranging from simple earthenware pots to elaborate carved, wheel-turned or cast items made from clay or bronze.

The term has also come to refer to the censers of other peoples of the ancient world, such as the Phoenicians and Etruscans.

Various types of thymiateria are still used in Greek Orthodox rituals. They are commonly known also as "livanisteria" (from the word livanos, transl. incense).

== Bibliography ==
- Morstadt, Bärbel (2007). "Thymiateria als Zeugnisse des Orientalisierungsprozesses im Mittelmeerraum unter besonderer Berücksichtigung der zyprischen Funde" [Thymiateria as evidence of the orientalisation process in the Mediterranean region with special consideration of Cypriot finds]. In Rogge, Sabine (ed.). Begegnungen. Materielle Kulturen auf Zypern bis in die römische Zeit. Münster: Waxmann. pp. 15–37. ISBN 978-3-8309-1922-3.
- Zaccagnino, Cristiana (1998). Il thymiaterion nel mondo greco. Analisi delle fonti, tipologia, impieghi [The thymiaterion in the Greek world. Analysis of sources, typology, uses]. Rom: "L'Erma" di Bretschneider. ISBN 88-8265-009-X.
- Wigand, Karl (1912). "Thymiateria". Bonner Jahrbücher. 122: 1–97. doi:10.11588/bjb.1912.0.60539.
