= Military exercises of the Republic of Cyprus =

Cyprus is the third-largest island in the Mediterranean. It gained independence from the United Kingdom in 1960 and became a republic in the Commonwealth of Nations in 1961. The Republic of Cyprus is a developed country and has been a member of the European Union since 1 May 2004.

== Status of the Republic of Cyprus ==
The Republic of Cyprus is an internationally recognised sovereign country, a portion of which is under foreign military occupation by Turkey. The occupation, which began on 20 July 1974 and continues to the present day, has been in direct contradiction with a number of passed resolutions of the UN Security Council.

== Armed Forces of the Republic of Cyprus ==
The Republic of Cyprus is protected by a combined arms force known as the Cypriot National Guard. This force comprises land, air, naval and Special Forces units, within a highly organised and modernised structure of command, control and communication. The Cypriot National Guard performs a variety of military exercises, usually involved in the combined-arms role rather than favouring individual units. The largest military exercise is named Nikiforos-Toxotis, and this is the main annual war games of the Republic of Cyprus, with cooperation from the Hellenic armed forces.

== Nikiforos-Toxotis ==
The Nikiforos-Toxotis exercise is typically held on an annual basis, though on several occasions, it has been cancelled for political reasons. The exercise involves the mobilisation of all active forces and the majority of first-line reserve forces, as well as elements of the second-line forces and Home Guard. Participating units are usually instructed to implement live-fire practice of their associated armaments as part of an organised training program, routinely against mock-up targets. This includes tanks, armoured vehicle mounted weapons, general artillery, anti-tank artillery, mortar artillery and the full spectrum of infantry carried small arms. The exercise implements the organisation and tactics of combined-arms warfare, and also invites participation from the Hellenic Air Force and Navy, as well as the Greek ELDYK contingent in Cyprus.

=== Turkish reactions ===
The Turkish Government routinely reacts to the Nikiforos-Toxotis exercise by organising its own military exercises in northern Cyprus, and occasionally by conducting penetrative violations of the Nicosia Flight Information Region (FIR) with its Air Force jet aircraft. The Turkish Government routinely denounces the use of the Nikiforos-Toxotis exercise.

=== Timeline ===
- Nikiforos-Toxotis 95 - Completed with Greek air and naval participation.^{1}
- Nikiforos-Toxotis 96 - Completed over 5 days with Greek air and naval participation. Turkish fighter aircraft violate the Nicosia FIR and interfere with Greek military aviation. ²
- Nikiforos-Toxotis 97 - Completed over 5 days with Greek air and naval participation. Turkey reacted by holding the "Toros" military exercise in the north of the island. ³
- Nikiforos-Toxotis 98 - Completed over 5 days with Greek air and naval participation, followed by military parade in Larnaca. Turkey reacted with airspace violations of the Nicosia FIR.^{4}
- Nikiforos-Toxotis 99 - Completed over 5 days with Greek air and naval participation, followed by military parades in Larnaca and Paphos. ^{5}
- Nikiforos-Toxotis 2000 - Completed with Greek air and naval participation. Altercations reported between Greek and Turkish warplanes. ^{6}
- Nikiforos 2001 - Completed without Greek air and naval participation (Toxotis phase), which is postponed indefinitely due to political considerations. ^{7}
- Nikiforos(-Toxotis) 2002 - Cancelled ^{8}
- Nikiforos(-Toxotis) 2003 - Cancelled ^{9}
- Nikiforos(-Toxotis) 2004 - Cancelled ^{10}
- Nikiforos 2005 - Completed over three days without Greek air and naval participation. ^{11}
- Nikiforos 2006 - Completed over five days without Greek air and naval participation.^{12}

== Other Military Exercises ==
The Cypriot National Guard conducts military exercises throughout its operating year, usually on a much smaller scale than Nikiforos and expending much smaller quantities of ordnance. The names of these exercises are not normally published.

== Sources ==
- 1. www.hri.org/news/Greek/ana/1995/95-09-28.ana.html
- 2. www.hri.org/cgi-bin/brief?/news/Cyprus/cna/1996/96-10-07.cna.html
- 3. www.hri.org/news/Cyprus/cna/1997/97-09-09.cna.html
- 4. www.hri.org/news/Cyprus/cna/1998/98-10-23_1.cna.html
- 5. www.hri.org/news/Cyprus/cna/1999/99-10-07.cna.html
- 6. www.hri.org/cgi-bin/brief?/news/Cyprus/cna/2000/00-10-17_1.cna.html
- 7. www.hri.org/news/Cyprus/cypio/2001/01-10-22.cypio.html
- 8. www.hri.org/news/Cyprus/cmnews/2002/02-02-17.cmnews.html
- 9. www.hri.org/cgi-bin/brief?/news/Cyprus/cna/2003/03-10-09.cna.html
- 10. www.hri.org/cgi-bin/brief?/news/Cyprus/cna/2004/04-09-21.cna.html
- 11. www.hri.org/news/Greek/ana/2005/05-10-24.ana.html
- 12. www.hri.org/news/Greek/ana/2006/06-10-09.ana.html
