= Nikephoros =

Nikephoros (Greek: Νικηφόρος), Nikiforos or Nicephorus is a Greek male name meaning "Bringer of Victory" that was commonly used among the aristocracy of the Byzantine Empire. It may refer to:

== Rulers ==
- Nikephoros I Logothetes, Byzantine emperor 802–811
- Nikephoros II Phokas, Byzantine emperor 963–969
- Nikephoros III Botaneiates, Byzantine emperor 1078–1081
- Nikephoros I Komnenos Doukas, despot of Epirus 1267–1297
- Nikephoros II Orsini, ruler of Epirus 1335–1338 and 1356–1359

== Ecclesiastical leaders ==
- Nicephorus I of Constantinople, Byzantine writer and patriarch, 758–828, author of the Stichometry and other works
- Nicephorus II of Constantinople, patriarch in exile at Nicaea
- Nicephorus of Antioch, Greek Orthodox Patriarch of Antioch, 1084–1090
- Nicephorus II of Kiev, Metropolitan of Kyiv and all Ruthenia, 1183–1198
- Patriarch Nicephorus of Alexandria, Orthodox Patriarch of Alexandria between 1639 and 1645
- Nikiforos of Didymoteicho, Metropolitan of Didymoteicho in 1988–2009

== Others ==
- Nikephoros (Caesar) (c. 755 – after 812), half-brother of Leo IV, involved in several conspiracies
- Nikephoros Nikephoritzes (died 1078), eunuch chief minister of Michael VII Doukas
- Nikephoros Basilakes, Byzantine usurper against Nikephoros III in 1078/1079
- Nikephoros Bryennios (ethnarch), father of Nikephoros Bryennios the Elder
- Nikephoros Bryennios the Elder, Byzantine general who made an attempt on the throne of Michael VII Doukas in 1077–1078
- Nikephoros Bryennios the Younger, son of the preceding, Byzantine general, statesman and historian, 1062–1137
- Nikephoros Choumnos (c. 1250–1327), Byzantine chief minister and scholar
- Nikephoros Diogenes general and son to Byzantine emperor Romanos IV Diogenes
- Nicephorus Gregoras, Byzantine historian, c. 1295–1360
- Nikephoros Kallistos Xanthopoulos, Greek ecclesiastical historian, c. 1320
- Nikephoros Komnenos (c. 970 – after 1026/7), Byzantine commander and governor
- Nikephoros Melissenos (c. 1045–1104), Byzantine general, self-proclaimed emperor and Caesar
- Nikephoros Ouranos, Byzantine general, chief aide to the emperor Basil II, viceroy in the East from 999 to c. 1010
- Nikephoros Phokas the Elder, Byzantine general, grandfather of emperor Nikephoros II
- Nikephoros the Monk, 13th-century monk and spiritual writer
- Nikephoros Theotokis (1731–1800), Greek scholar who became an archbishop in Russia
- Nikephoros Xiphias, Byzantine general, also aide to the emperor Basil II
- Nikiforos Diamandouros (born 1942), Greek and EU ombudsman
- Nikiforos Lytras (1832–1904), Greek painter
- Nikiforos Vrettakos (1912–1991), Greek writer
- Nikiforos (Greek singer)

== See also ==
- Nikifor (given name)
