= Nikiforov =

Nikiforov (Russian: Никифоров) is a Russian masculine surname, its feminine counterpart is Nikiforova. Notable people with the surname include:

- Aleksey Nikiforov (born 1957), Lithuanian ice hockey player
- Galin Nikiforov (born 1968), Bulgarian writer
- Maria Nikiforova (1885–1919), Ukrainian partisan leader
- Nikolay Nikiforov (born 1982), Russian politician
- Oleksandr Nikiforov (born 1967), Ukrainian football player
- Pyotr Nikiforov (1882–1974), Russian revolutionary
- Viktor Nikiforov (1931–1989), Soviet ice hockey player
- Vladislav Nikiforov (born 1989), Russian football player
- Vyacheslav Nikiforov (born 1966), Russian football player
- Yevgeny Nikiforov (born 1970), Russian General
- Yuriy Nikiforov (born 1970), Ukrainian-Russian football coach and a former player
