= Nike of Megara =

Ancient Greek statue of Nike

- Νίκη των Μεγάρων (Greek)
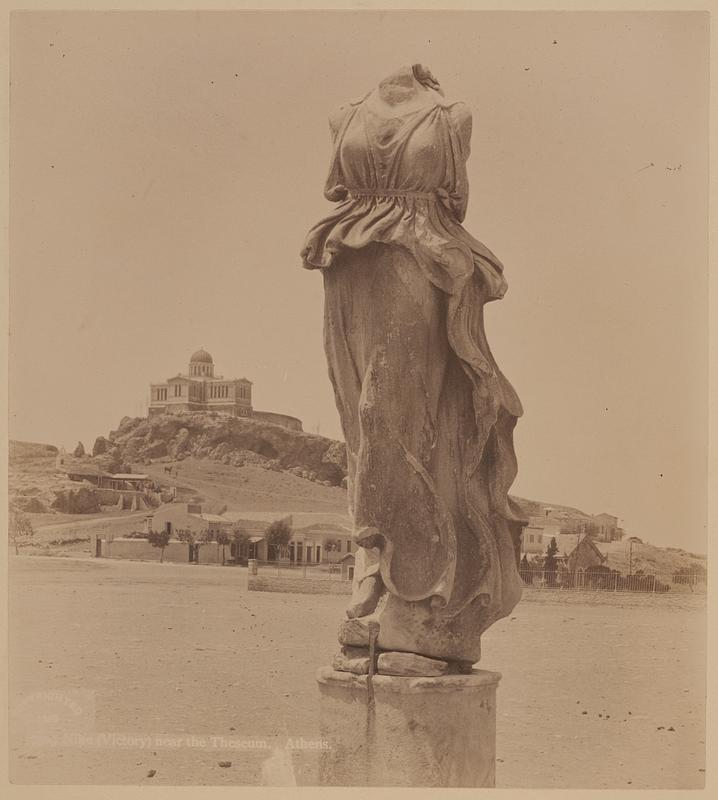
- The Nike of Megara in 1889
- Year: 300 BC
- Catalogue: Γ255
- Medium: White marble
- Movement: Hellenistic
- Subject: The goddess Nike
- Condition: Head, arms, wings and lower left leg missing
- Location: National Archaeological Museum; Athens

The Nike of Megara (Greek: Νίκη των Μεγάρων) is a large ancient Greek marble sculpture of the late fourth or early third century BC. The Hellenistic statue depicts Nike, the winged Greek goddess of victory; its arms, wings and head are not preserved. The statue was discovered in the nineteenth century near Megara, a town near Athens, Greece. It is kept in the National Archaeological Museum of Athens, although in storage, and not in exhibition.

== Dating the sculpture ==
Based on stylistic comparisons, several different dates for the work have been proposed. Most probably, it can be dated to around 300 BC, during the early Hellenistic period. Due to the circumstances of its excavation, there is little documented interpretation as to the Nike's origins. Its massive size indicates that it was made as a public dedication in a shrine. It has been proposed that the statue served as a votive monument commemorating a military victory that must have taken place in the area, not unlike two more famous Nike statues, the Winged Victory of Samothrace from Samothrace and the Nike of Paionios in Olympia. The statue may have been erected on behalf of Cassander or Demetrius I Poliorcetes when they successively controlled the region around Megara. The city of Megara itself appears to have had little power and few financial resources in that era.

== Discovery ==
The Nike of Megara was found in Megara a town due west of Athens. There are two versions of the discovery of the statue. According to one, it was found on the beach at Nisaea in 1830; according to the other, it was found in 1820, at the outset of the Greek War of Independence, together with some proxeny decrees in the north-west of the Karia hill. Archival documents support the early date and that the finder was the Corinthian man named Theochares Rentis. The statue probably originally belonged to the Olympieion of Megara.

Two more colossal female statues were also found alongside it. In June 1827, Rentis's widow sold all three statues to Carl Wilhelm von Heideck, agent of King Ludwig I of Bavaria, just a month after the Provision of the Third National Assembly at Troezen that banned the sale and export of antiquities. Heideck thus was not allowed to export the three statues.

One of them was eventually sold by some Greeks the following month to an American captain, who donated it to the Academy of Fine Arts in Philadelphia where it was destroyed in 1937. The second statue was moved to the National Museum on the island of Aegina where it was put in record and given an accession number in the museum's catalogue of antiquities. It has been identified with a colossal female statue in the museum of Aegina (inv. no. 2253), though this identification has been met with doubt (but not dismissal).

This meant that the Nike alone stayed at Megara, until 1840 when it was transferred to the “Central Public Museum for the antiquities” that had been housed since 1835 in the Temple of Hephaestus in the agora of Athens, incorrectly then identified as the Theseum. The work was then transported to a new location, the National Archaeological Museum, in 1889.

It has never been exhibited to the public. In 2018, after more than a hundred years that the statue had spent in storage, the municipality of Megara asked the NAMA for the return of the Nike so it might be displayed in the Archaeological Museum of Megara; the museum rejected the offer, and claimed that their intention was to exhibit the Nike in the central hall of the National Archaeological Museum for the bicentennial anniversary of Greek independence in 2021; this however never happened, and the Nike of Megara remains in storage. The museum of Megara displays a copy of an 1847 engraving of it instead.

== Description ==
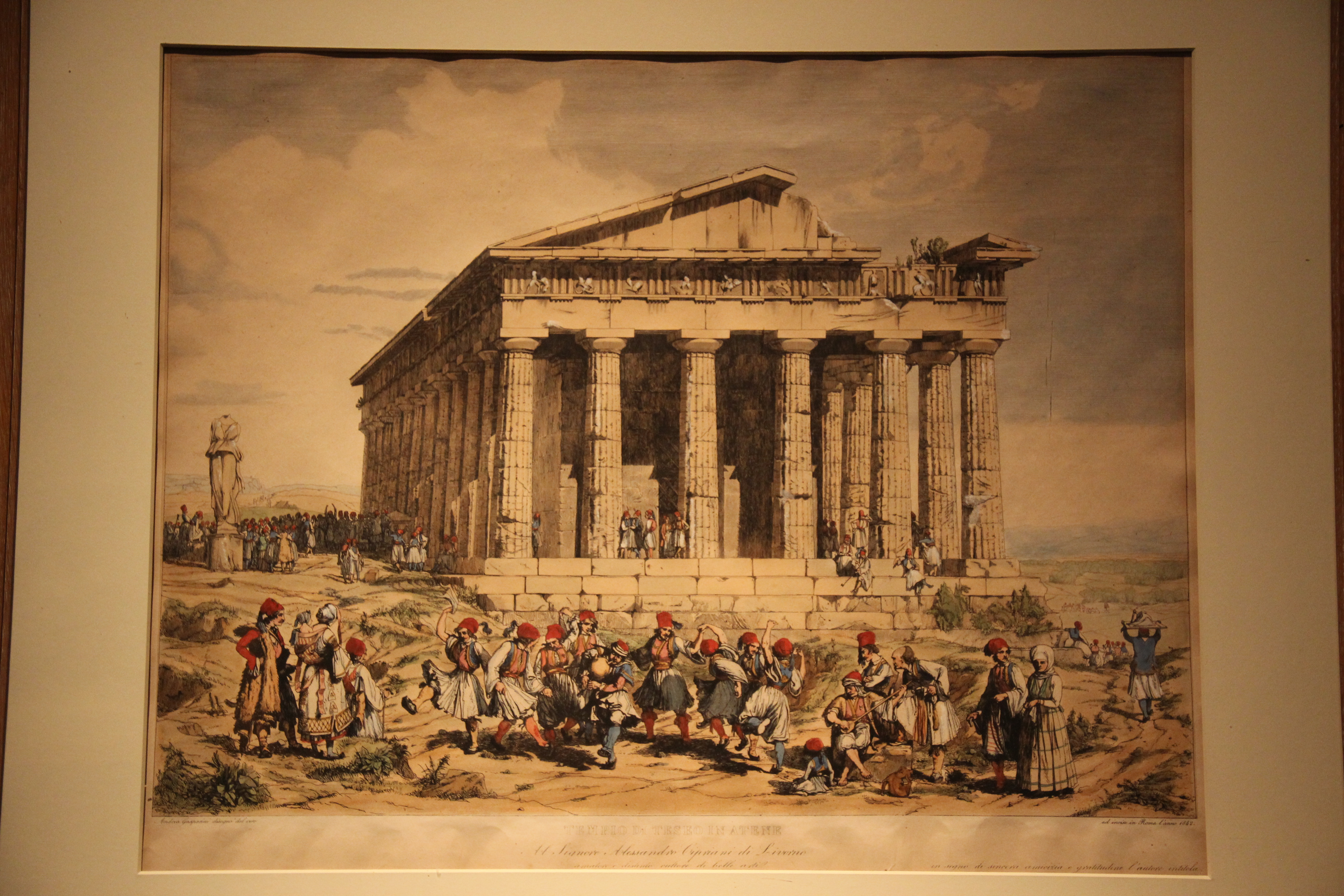
The Nike of Megara next to the Temple of Hephaestus, 1842 engraving.

Even without the head and the wings, the statue still measures 2,56 meters (or 100 in) in height, making it over lifesize. The Nike of Megara was carved from a block of white Pentelic marble. The surface is seriously corroded, which – depending on which discovery story is true – could be due to the exposure to the sea water.

The colossal statue, whose separately made head, arms and wings are missing and not preserved, depicts the goddess striding, with her right foot stepping on the plinth while the left one is advanced, trying thus to capture a sense of flight, while the upper part of her body is twisted in the opposite direction. The lower part of her left leg is also missing. The Nike wears a chiton, of which only the sleeves are visible, and a peplos with a long apoptygma, or an overfold, girt high around the goddess's waist that accentuates her body's contour. The garment she wears enhances the impression that she is moving, as it clings to her legs and billowes in the wind on either side of Nike. This is also achieved with the sideways movement of the apoptygma folds. However, the dynamics of flying are not as clearly represented in the posture as in earlier Nike depictions of Greek classical art. Her right arm would have probably been stretched upwards and perhaps holding a wreath, while the left would be hanging at the side.

In 1840, the statue was installed on a cylindrical pedestal as shown in a 1842 coloured engraving by Andrea Gasparini. It has been said of the Nike of Megara that, although she would have been even more magnificent when complete with her missing head and spread wings, she does not lack the monumentality of the more celebrated Nike statues of the classical and Hellenistic antiquities.

== See also ==
Other statues of Nike in Greece include:

- Victoria Romana
- Nike of Paros
- Nike of Epidaurus
- Nike of Marathon

== Bibliography ==
- Gulaki, Alexandra (1981). Klassische und Klassizistische Nikedarstellungen. Untersuchungen zur Typologie und zum Bedeutungswandel [Classical and classicist representations of Nike. Studies on typology and semantic change] (in German). Bonn. pp. 79–88.
- Kavvadias, Panagiotis (1890). Γλυπτά του Εθνικού Μουσείου [Sculptures of the National Museum] (in Greek). Athens, Greece: S. K. Vlastos.
- Tsouli, Chrysanthi (2021). "Chronicle of a journey. The Nike of Megara at the National Archaeological Museum". In Maria Lagogianni-Georgakarakos (ed.). Known and Unknown Nikai. Athens, Greece: Greek Ministry of Culture and Sports. ISBN 978-960-386-512-4.
