= Paeonius of Mende =

Greek sculptor of the late 5th century BC

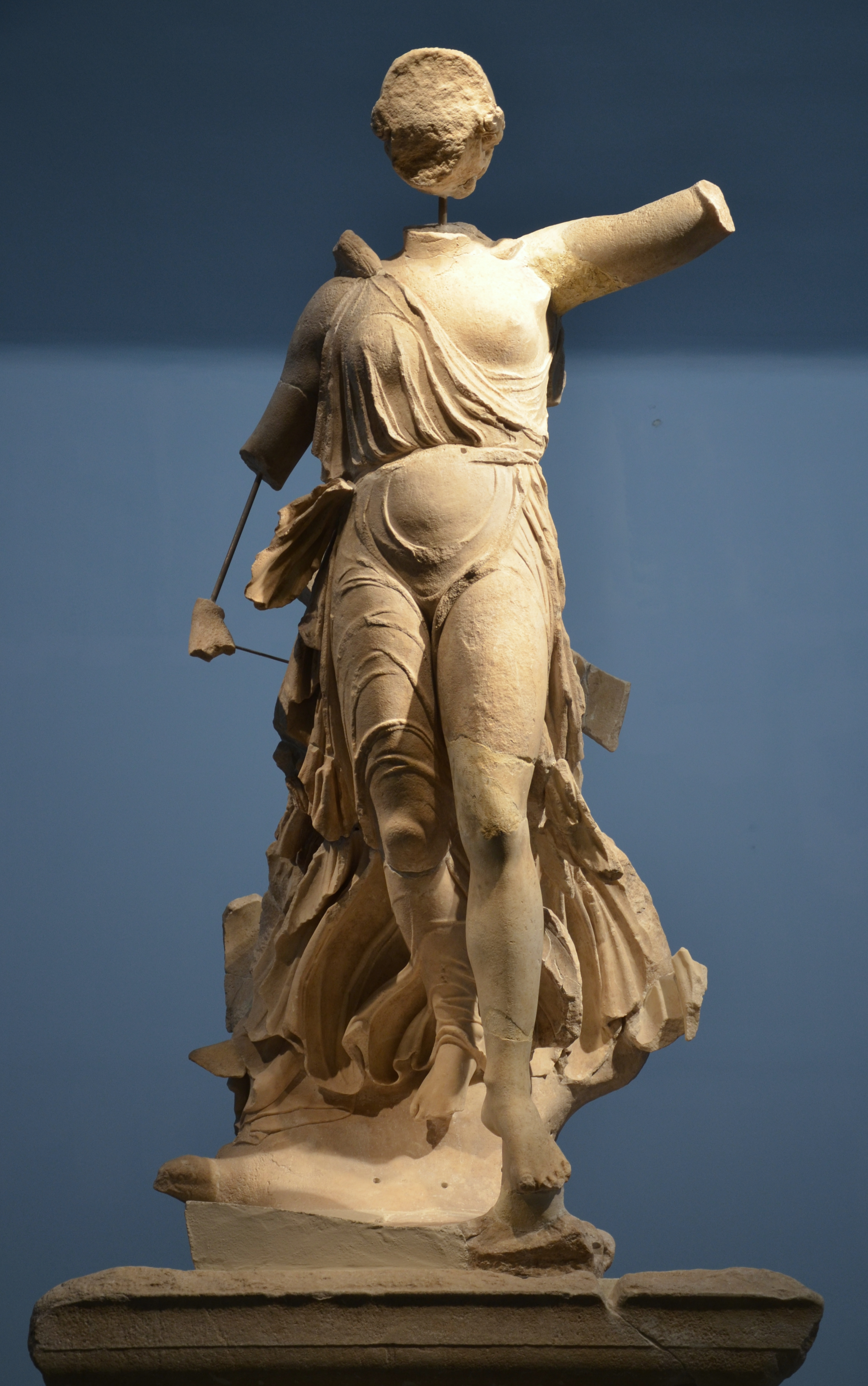
Nike of Paionios, Archaeological Museum of Olympia, Greece

Paeonius or Paionios /piːˈoʊniəs/ (Ancient Greek: Παιώνιος; Paiṓnios) of Mende, Chalkidiki was an ancient Greek sculptor of the late 5th century BC. He most likely received his early training in Northern Greece and is thought to have later adapted Athenian stylistic elements into his own work, based upon his probable interaction with the Olympia workshop of Phidias. In any case, he was "Attic-trained."

Paionios won the commission to decorate the acroteria of the Temple of Zeus at Olympia, as described in the pedestal inscription on his Nike statue. An ancient account also references Paionios' work at Olympia. Pausanias attributes the front (east) pediment sculptures of the Temple of Zeus to Paionios. The Temple of Athena Nike parapet at Athens is also often attributed to Paionios, on the basis of similarities between the styles of drapery on both monuments. Despite this assertion, scholars continue to debate the reliability of these attributions based upon the various interpretations of the scant additional evidence.

The Nike of Paionios featured prominently in the design of medals of the 2004 Summer Olympics in Athens, as it did in the design of medals from succeeding Olympiads. The statue likely influenced later artistic renderings of victory personified. It is on permanent exhibition at the Archaeological Museum of Olympia.

== Nike of Paionios ==
The only work that can be positively attributed to him is the statue of Nike (erected c. 420 BC) discovered at Olympia. The Nike of Paeonios adorned a three-sided triangular pillar roughly 30 feet tall. She stood in the Altis of the Temple of Zeus. With her wings and head intact, the statue itself was about 3 meters tall. Her drapery would have been painted red. The German School began excavations at Olympia in 1875; the French School had done excavations earlier in the nineteenth century.

The Nike of Paeonius was erected c. 420 BC; a few years after the Athenian allies defeated the Spartans at the Battle of Sphacteria in 425 BC. The inscription reads that it "The Messenians and Naupaktians dedicated this to Zeus Olympios as a tithe from the enemies.

The Messenians and Naupaktians, allies of the Athenians, are careful not to mention "their enemies," the Spartans, by name. Pausanias, a travelling writer in the 2nd century AD, wrote, "But the Messenians themselves say that the offering is a trophy of the battle in which they fought on the Athenian side in the island of Sphacteria and that they refrained from inscribing the name of the enemy for fear of the Lacedaemonians (Spartans)." The placement of this dedicatory statue at Olympia, considered Spartan ground, is most often interpreted by scholars as a deliberate and assertive act of dominance.

This sculpture may be understood as political propaganda within the context of the Messenian Wars. At least a century earlier, the Spartans had erected a statue of Zeus in the sanctuary, commemorating a victory over the Messenians. This dedication is also mentioned by Pausanias. The positioning of the Nike may be seen as a visual response: the Nike erected by the Messenians and Naupaktians would appear to the visitor in front of the hand of the Zeus dedication behind it.

Paeonios combined both Ionian and Doric traditions in this monument. The erection of an offering on a high pillar is of Ionian origin, as the Dorians tended to use lower bases. By placing a well-known, generic image of triumph upon a pillar to symbolize a specific Victory, Paionios added to this tradition. The Ionians also favored marble more often, yet the Nike wears a Dorian peplos.

Paeonios slips his own victory into the inscription on his Nike monument. It reads that he was the "successful competitor in the construction of the acroteria for the temple." His victory in the competition was likely the result of devising not only the most aesthetically pleasing option but also the most financially feasible. That this statue is inscribed with the fund, occasion, and the artist makes it invaluable for creating a history of Greek artistic and dedicatory work.
