= Nike of Paros =

Greek sculpture depicting Nike

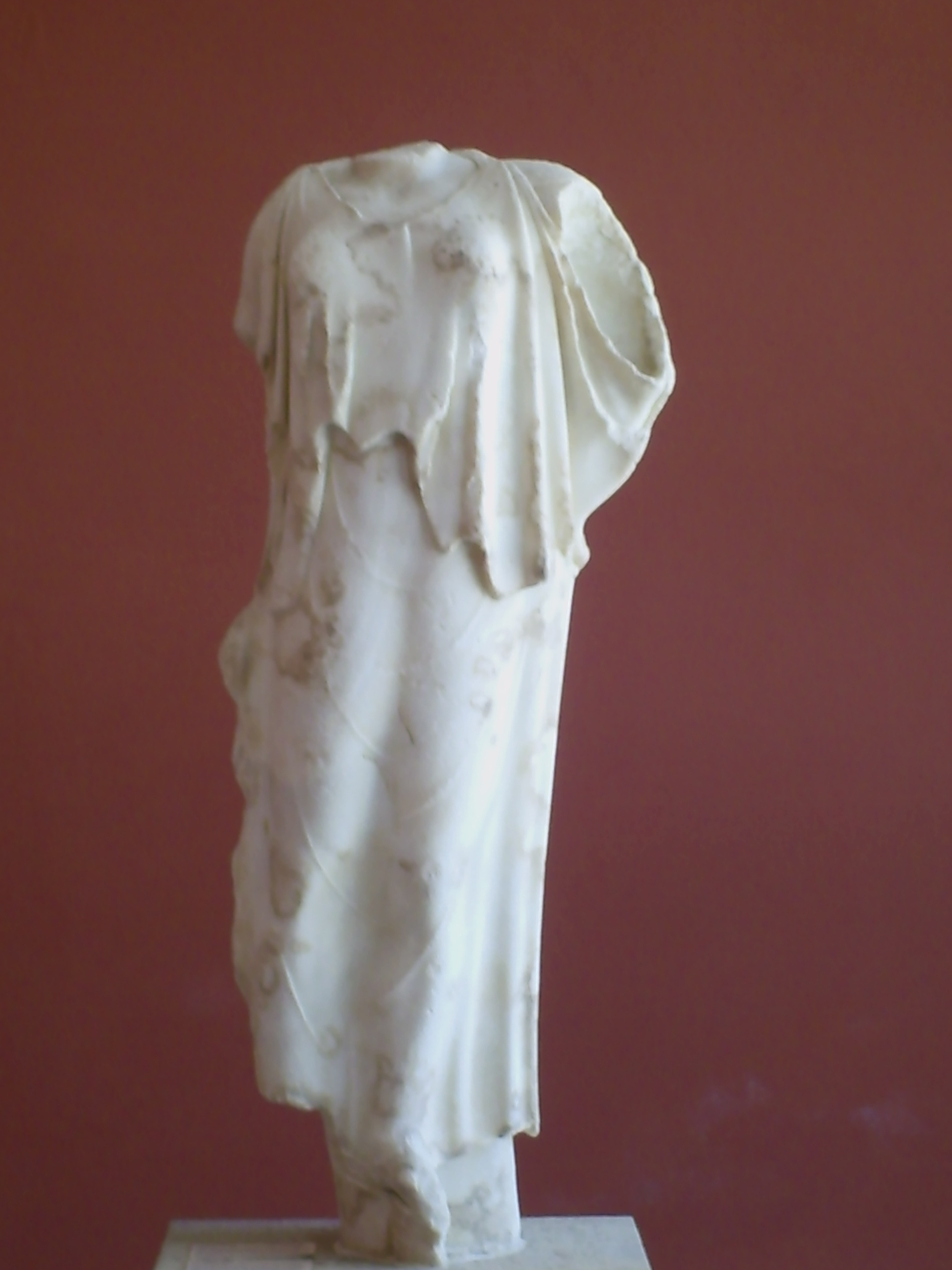
Front view

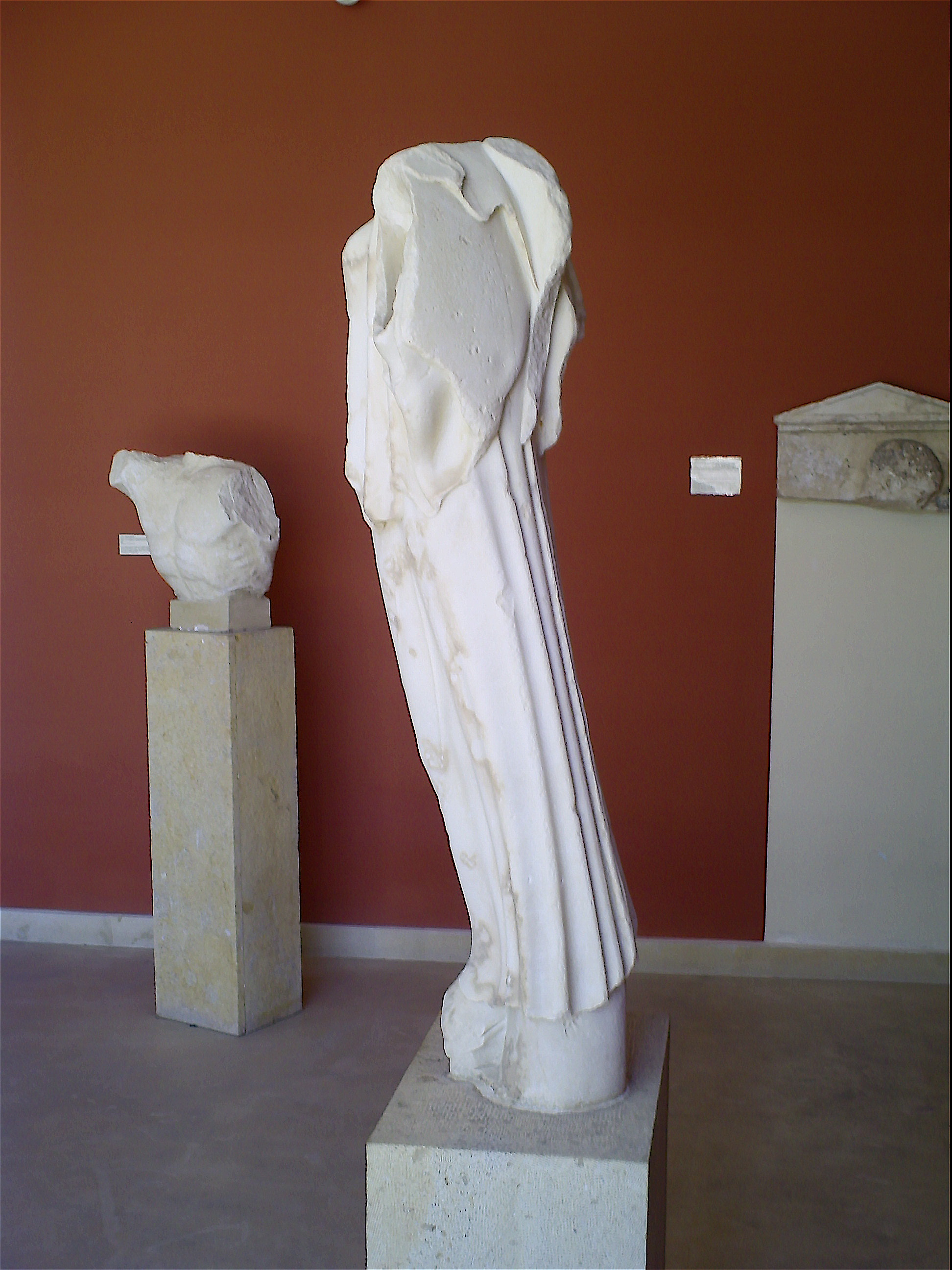
Side view

The Nike of Paros is an early classical depiction of Nike from the 5th century BC (c. 480 BC). The white marble figure was found before 1885 on the island of Paros. It is currently on display at the Archaeological Museum of Paros.

== Description ==
The female figure, originally winged, was depicted floating in mid-air, in an unbelted peplos which hung open. The wings and this posture identify her as Nike.

The head, left arm, lower right arm, most of the wings and the feet are missing. Even so, it can be recognised that the left leg is slightly further forward, while the right leg seems to have been pulled back. This posture in connection with the forward lean of the figure as a whole is also a characteristic posture in later depictions of Nike like the Nike of Paionios. In the classical period this posture replaced the archaic "kneeling run" as the usual way of depicting Nike. The forward slope of the body's axis, which is created mainly by the straightness of the upper body and the strong incline of the lower body to the left, would have made the whole figure tilt slightly and would have shifted all weight off the left leg. The left arm must be reconstructed as having stretched upwards, when the figure was fixed in place. It is the resulting disregard for the rules of gravity which gave the Nike of Paros the appearance of floating. A transition takes place then in statuary from a sideways to a forward moving figure, as a result of the change in pose.

The original circumstances of this Nike's creation are not clearly known. Either she served as an acroterion or she must have been a victory monument. Although no Parian victory is known to have occurred around 470/60 BC, the fact that it is carved all the way round makes it more likely that it was a victory monument.

== See also ==
- Nike of Megara
- Victoria Romana (Hadrian's Library)
- Nike of Epidaurus

== Bibliography ==
- Alexandra Gulaki. Klassische und Klassizistische Nikedarstellungen. Unpublished PhD Dissertation, Bonn 1981, pp. 36ff.
- Cornelia Isler-Kerényi. Nike. Der Typus der laufenden Flügelfrau in archaischer Zeit. 1969, pp. 95ff.
- Y. Kourayos. Paros. Antiparos. 2004, p. 88.
- Cornelia Thöne. Ikonographische Studien zu Nike im 5. Jahrhundert v. Chr. Untersuchungen zur Wirkungsweise und Wesensart. Heidelberg 1999, ISBN 3-9804648-2-2.
- Ph. Zapheiropoulou. Paros. 1998, p. 50.
