= Nike of Epidaurus =

Sculpture of Nike

- Greek: Νίκη της Επιδαύρου
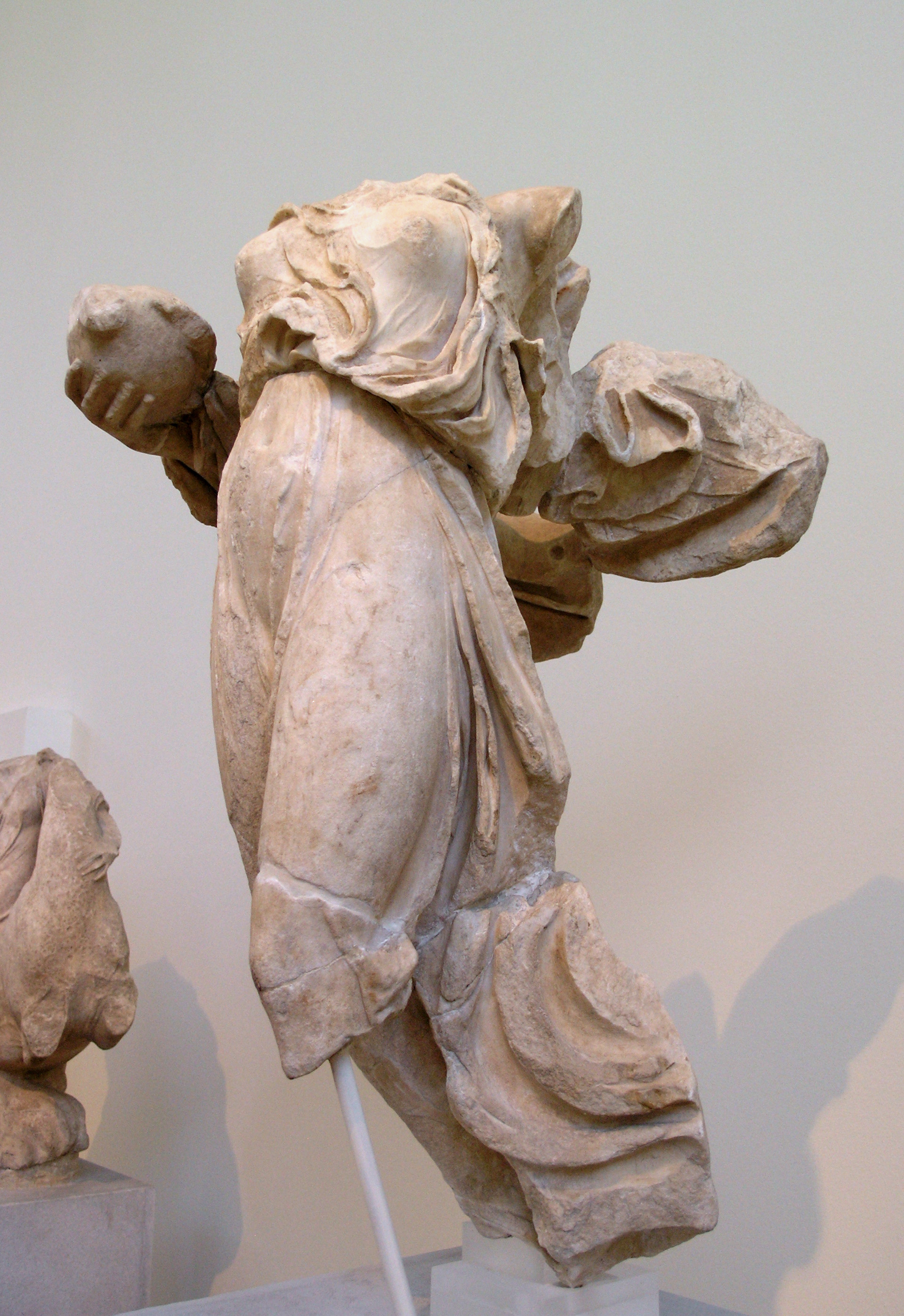
- The statuette in the NAMA
- Artist: Timotheos
- Year: 380 BC
- Catalogue: No 155
- Medium: Marble
- Movement: Classical
- Subject: Flying Nike
- Dimensions: 85 cm (33 in)
- Condition: Several parts missing
- Location: National Archaeological Museum, Athens
- Owner: Greece
- Website: https://www.namuseum.gr/

The Nike of Epidaurus (Greek: Νίκη της Επιδαύρου) is an ancient Greek marble statuette of Nike, the Greek goddess of victory, by the sculptor Timotheos, a renowned sculptor of antiquity. The Nike was once part of the west pediment of the temple of Asclepius, the Greek god of medicine and healing, in ancient Epidaurus. It is now kept in the National Archaeological Museum of Athens with inventory number 155 in Room 22.

== History ==
Despite the name, it is not the only statuette of Nike found in Epidaurus, as several more others that acted as temple finials have been unearthed in the same site; it was however the largest (when intact), and the most prominent.

It was sculpted by Timotheos (who was apparently the leading sculptor for the entire building) around 380 BC, and it was the central akroterion (roof ornament) on the west pediment of the temple of Asclepius in Epidaurus. It is likely that the Nike was not confined entirely within the triangular space of the pediment, but rather her head protruded from it. It was excavated around 1884 or a little before that.

== Description ==
Made of pentelic marble and with a height of 85 cm, it is smaller than lifesize.

The goddess is depicted upright, taking off and about to fly, as her left leg advances. She is wearing an almost transparent chiton and a himation on top, which billows in the wind behind her. In her right hand Nike is holding a partridge, which was a symbol of Asclepius's healing powers. Her head, left arm, right foot, left leg from below the knee are missing, while the himation and wings are broken.

== See also ==
- Victoria Romana (Hadrian's Library)
- Nike of Paionios
- Nike of Paros
- Nike of Marathon

== Bibliography ==
- Kaltsas, Nikolaos (2002). Sculpture in the National Archaeological Museum, Athens. Los Angeles, US: The J. Paul Getty Museum. ISBN 0-89236-686-9.
- Kavvadias, Panagiotis (1890). Γλυπτά του Εθνικού Μουσείου [Sculptures of the National Museum] (in Greek). Athens, Greece: S. K. Vlastos.
