= Temple of Athena Nike =

Ancient Greek temple on the Acropolis of Athens

Coordinates: 37.9715°N 23.7249°E

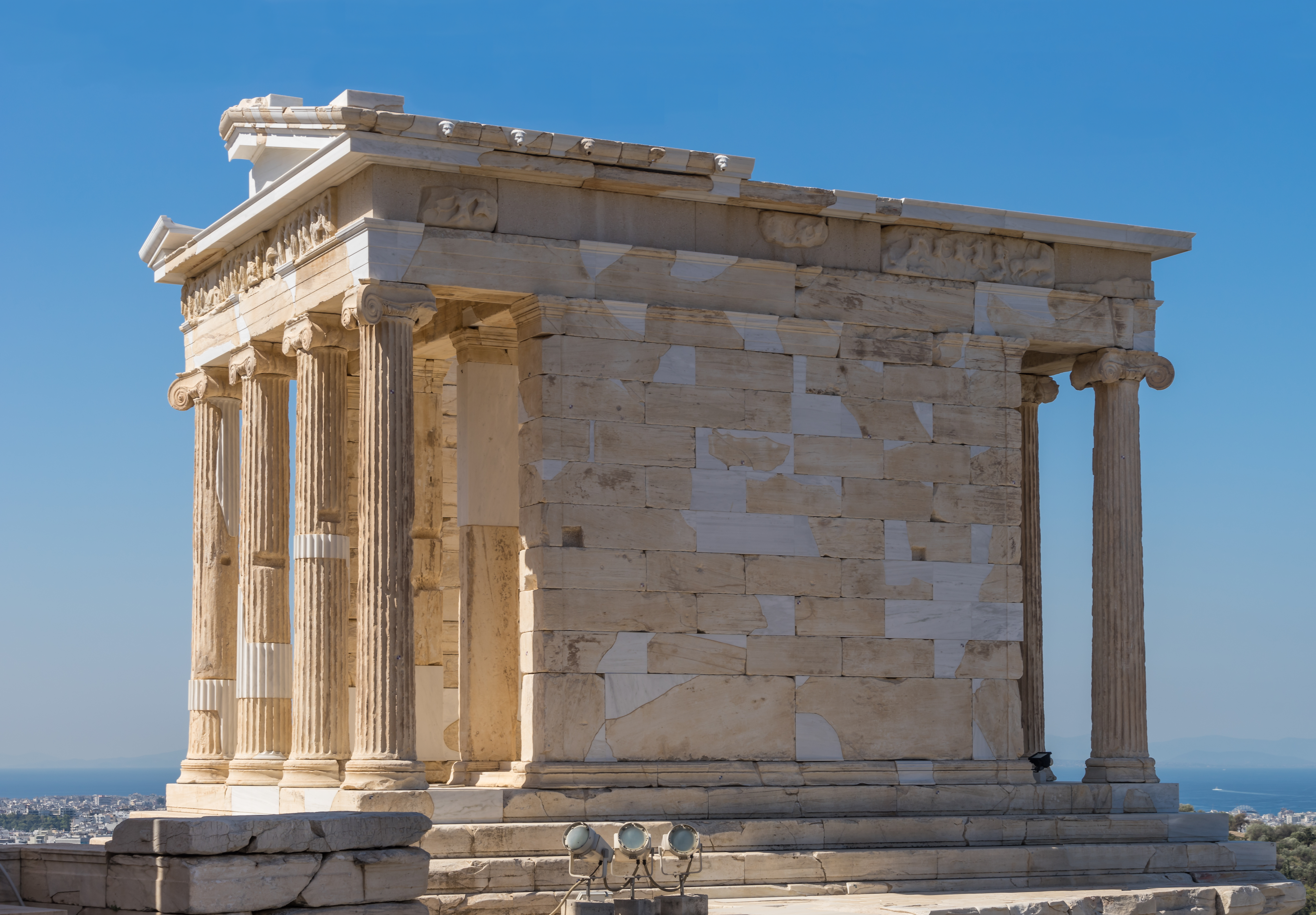
The Temple of Athena Nike

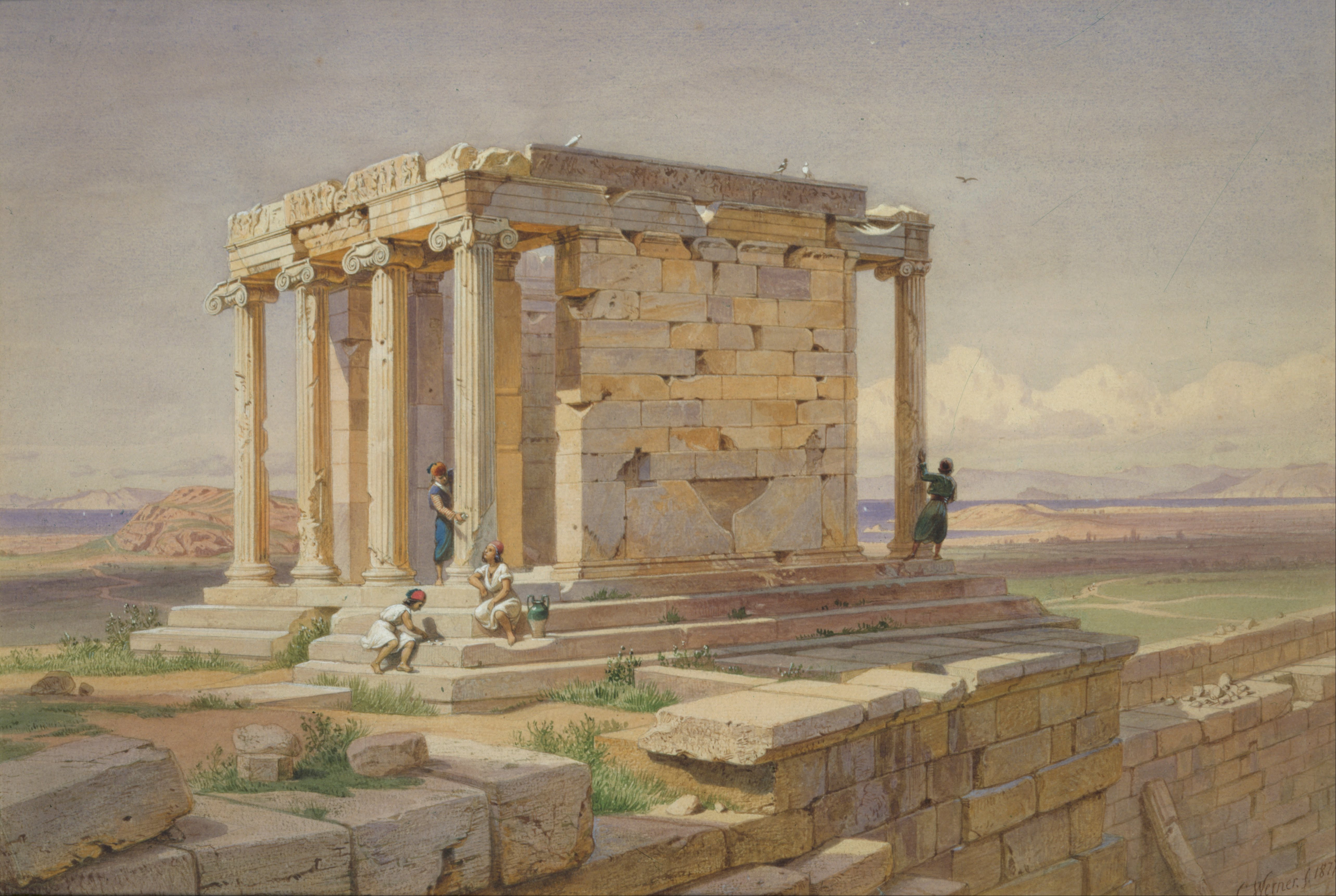
Painting of the Temple of Athena Nike, by Carl Werner, 1877

The Temple of Athena Nike (Greek: Ναός Αθηνάς Νίκης, Naós Athinás Níkis), the smallest temple on the Acropolis of Athens, is dedicated to the goddesses Athena and Nike. Built around 420 BC, the temple is the earliest (and purest expression of) fully Ionic temple on the Acropolis. It has a prominent position on a steep bastion at the southwest corner of the Acropolis to the right of the entrance, the Propylaea. In contrast to the Acropolis proper, a walled sanctuary entered through the Propylaea, the Victory Sanctuary was open, entered from the Propylaea's southwest wing and from a narrow stair on the north. The sheer walls of its bastion were protected on the north, west, and south by the Nike Parapet, named for its frieze of Nikai celebrating victory and sacrificing to their patroness, Athena and Nike.

Nike was the goddess of victory in Greek mythology, and Athena was worshipped in this form, representative of being victorious in war. The citizens worshipped the goddesses in hopes of a successful outcome in the long Peloponnesian War fought against the Spartans and allies.

== History ==
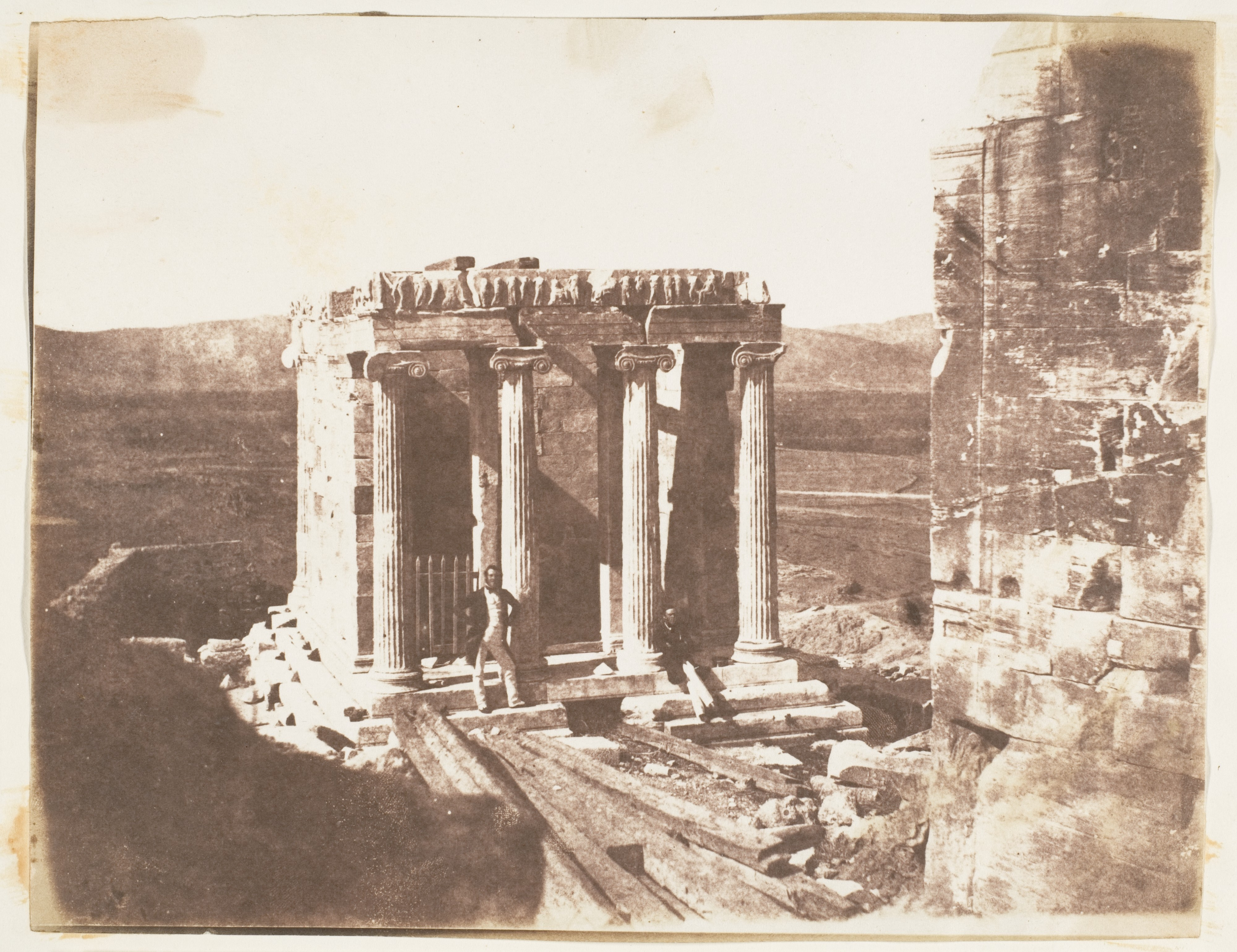
A photograph of Temple of Athena Nike taken in 1848 by George Wilson Bridges after its reconstruction in 1835-36

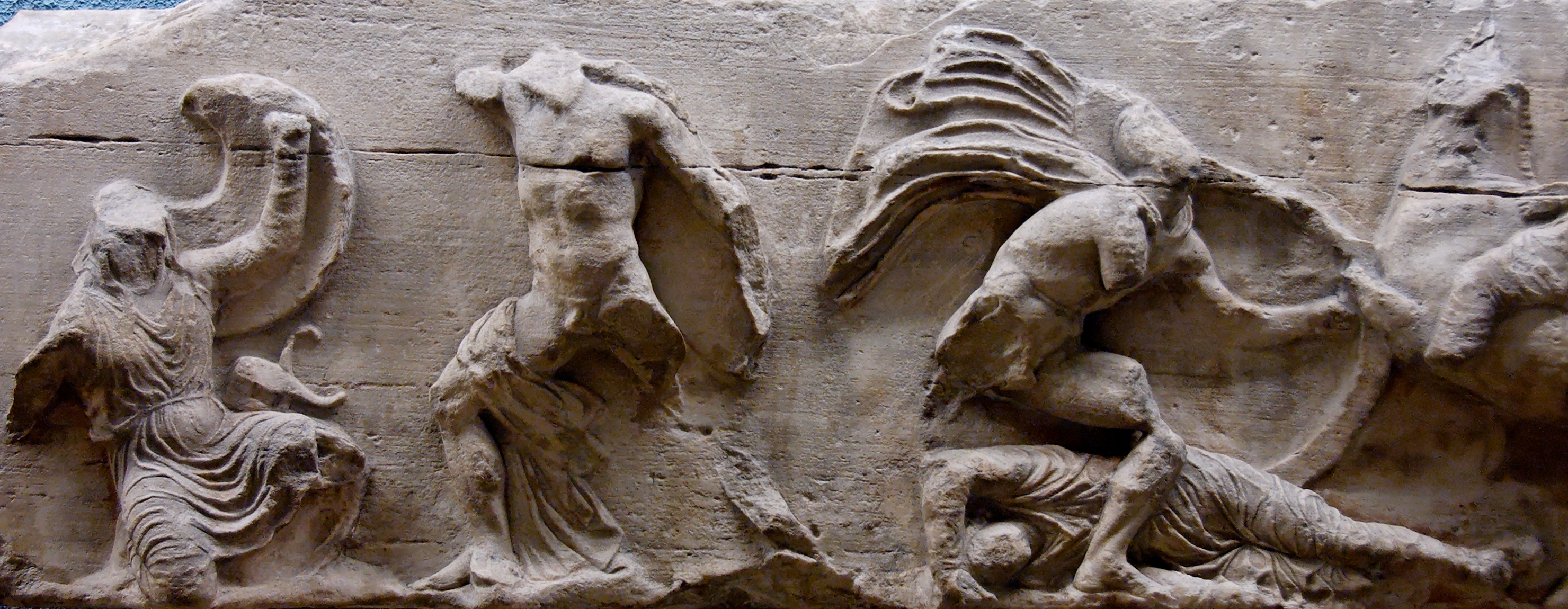
Scene of the Battle of Plataea, from the south frieze of the Temple of Athena Nike, British Museum (London)

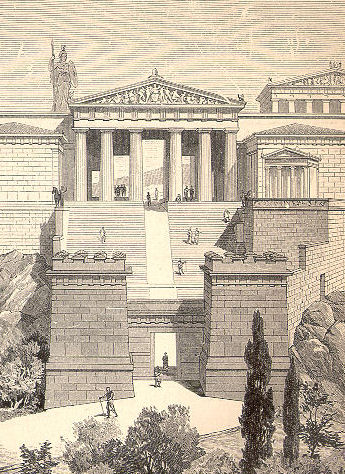
Temple of Athena Nike is on the right from the Propylaea

The cult of Athena Nike flourished in the early sixth century BC. On the remains of a Mycenaean bastion, a cult image of Athena seated holding a pomegranate in her right hand and holding a helmet in her left was placed on top of a square limestone base. The Sanctuary of Athena Nike was demolished by the Persians in 480-479 BC and a temple was built over the remains. The new temple construction was underway in 449 BC and was finished around 420 BC. The cult was supervised by the priestess of Athena Nike, who was appointed through democratic allotment. If still in use by the 4th century AD, the temple would have been closed during the persecution of pagans in the late Roman Empire.

Athens came under the rule of the Roman Empire in 146 B.C., and continued under its successor, the Byzantine Empire, until the city was captured by the Ottoman Empire in 1458. The temple sat untouched until it was demolished in 1686 by the Ottomans, who used the stones to build defenses. In 1834, the temple was reconstructed by the German archeologist Ludwig Ross. In 1998, the temple was dismantled so that the crumbling concrete floor could be replaced. Its frieze was removed and placed in the new Acropolis Museum that opened in 2009. The Temple of Athena Nike is often closed to visitors as work continues. The exhibit consists of fragments of the site before the Persians destroyed it in 480 BC. Sculptures from the friezes have been salvaged, such as the deeds of Hercules, a statue of Moscophoros, a damaged sculpture of a goddess credited to Praxiteles, and the Rampin horseman, as well as epigraphic dedications, decrees, and stelae.

== Architecture ==
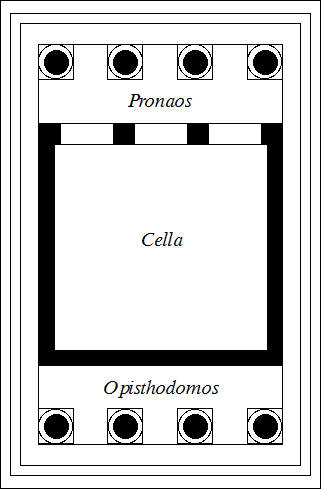
Floor plan

The Temple of Athena Nike, the smallest on the Acropolis, was finished around 420 BC, during the Peace of Nicias. It is a tetrastyle (four column) Ionic structure with a colonnaded portico at both front and rear facades (amphiprostyle), designed by the architect Kallikrates. The columns along the east and west fronts were monolithic columns. The temple ran 8 metres (26 feet) long by 5.5 metres (18 feet) wide and 7 metres (23 feet) tall. The total height from the stylobate to the acme of the pediment while the temple remained intact was a modest 7 metres (23 feet). The ratio of height to diameter of the columns is 7:1, rather than the more standard 9:1 or 10:1 ratio in Ionic buildings. Constructed from white Pentelic marble, it was built in stages as war-starved funding allowed.

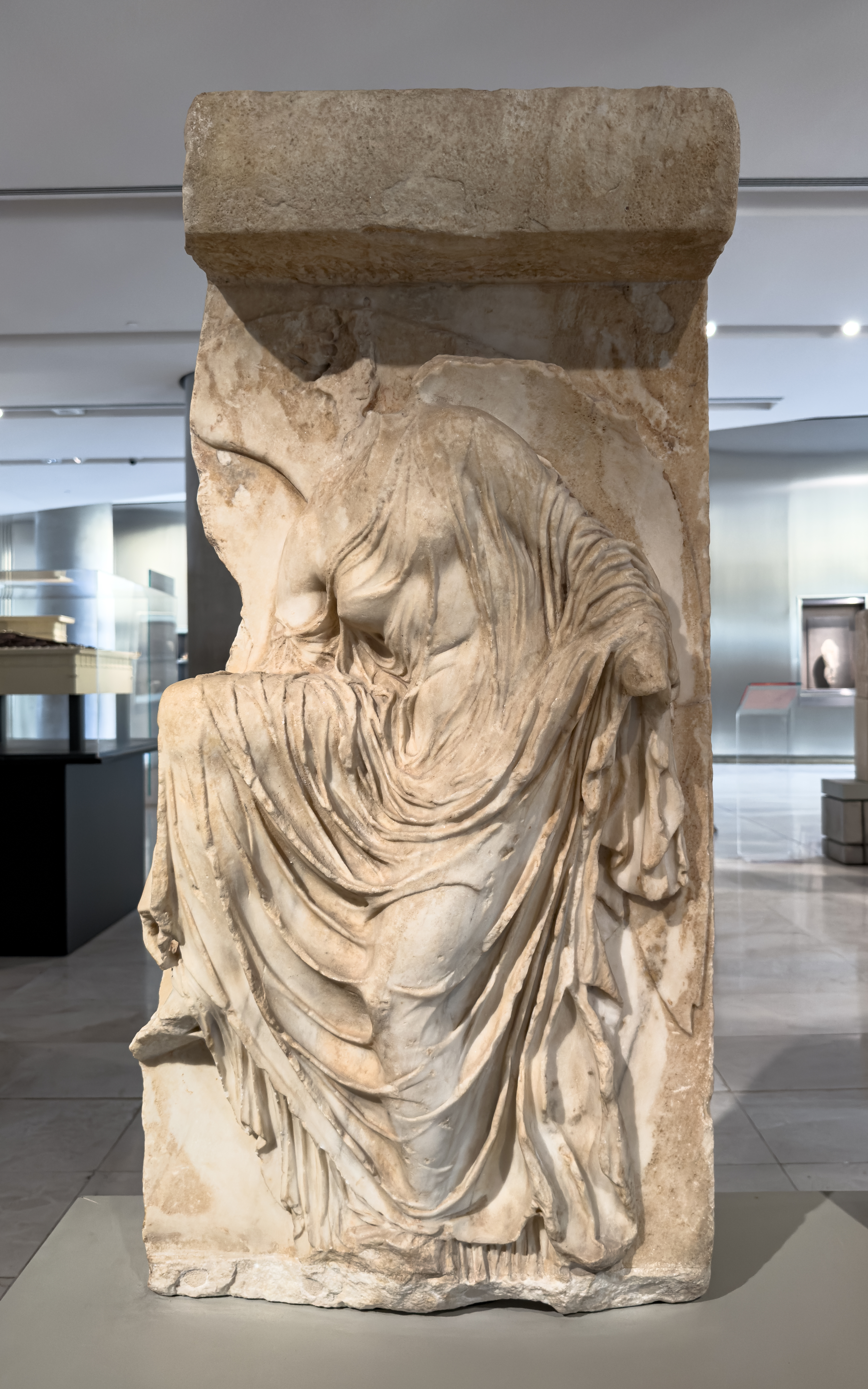
A relief from the parapet around the temple which shows Nike fixing her sandal. It is housed at the Acropolis Museum

== Friezes and parapets ==
=== Friezes ===
The friezes of the building's entablature were decorated on all sides with relief sculpture in the idealized classical style of the 5th century BC. The orientation of the temple is set up so that the East Frieze sits above the entrance of the temple on the porch side. The north frieze depicted a battle between Greeks entailing cavalry. The south frieze showed the decisive victory over the Persians at the battle of Plataea. The east frieze showed an assembly of the gods Athena, Zeus and Poseidon, rendering Athenian religious beliefs and reverence for the gods bound up in the social and political climate of 5th century Athens. The west frieze has a good amount of the original sculpting preserved. Similar to the east frieze it is most likely telling the story of a battle, or more specifically a victory. There are multiple corpses depicted (more than any of the other three friezes) and imagery of one about to be killed with some figures wearing helmets. This battle between armies most likely is depicting the massacre of the Corinthians by the Athenians.

Some time after the temple was completed, around 410 BC a parapet was added around it to prevent people from falling from the steep bastion. The outside of the parapet was adorned by carved relief sculptures showing Nike in a variety of activities, including two Nikai setting up a trophy, and all in procession.

Architects Christian Hansen and Eduard Schaubert excavated the temple in the 1830s. The building had been totally dismantled in the 17th century (sometime after 1687) and the stone built into the Turkish wall that surrounded the hill. A primitive anastylosis was carried out in 1836 when the Turkish wall was dismantled, the stones were recovered and the temple was re-erected from remaining parts. A third restoration was completed in Summer 2010. The main structure, stylobate and columns are largely intact, minus the roof and most of the tympanae. Fragments of the sculpted frieze are exhibited in the Acropolis Museum and the British Museum; copies of these are fixed in their place on the temple.

=== Parapet of Nike ===
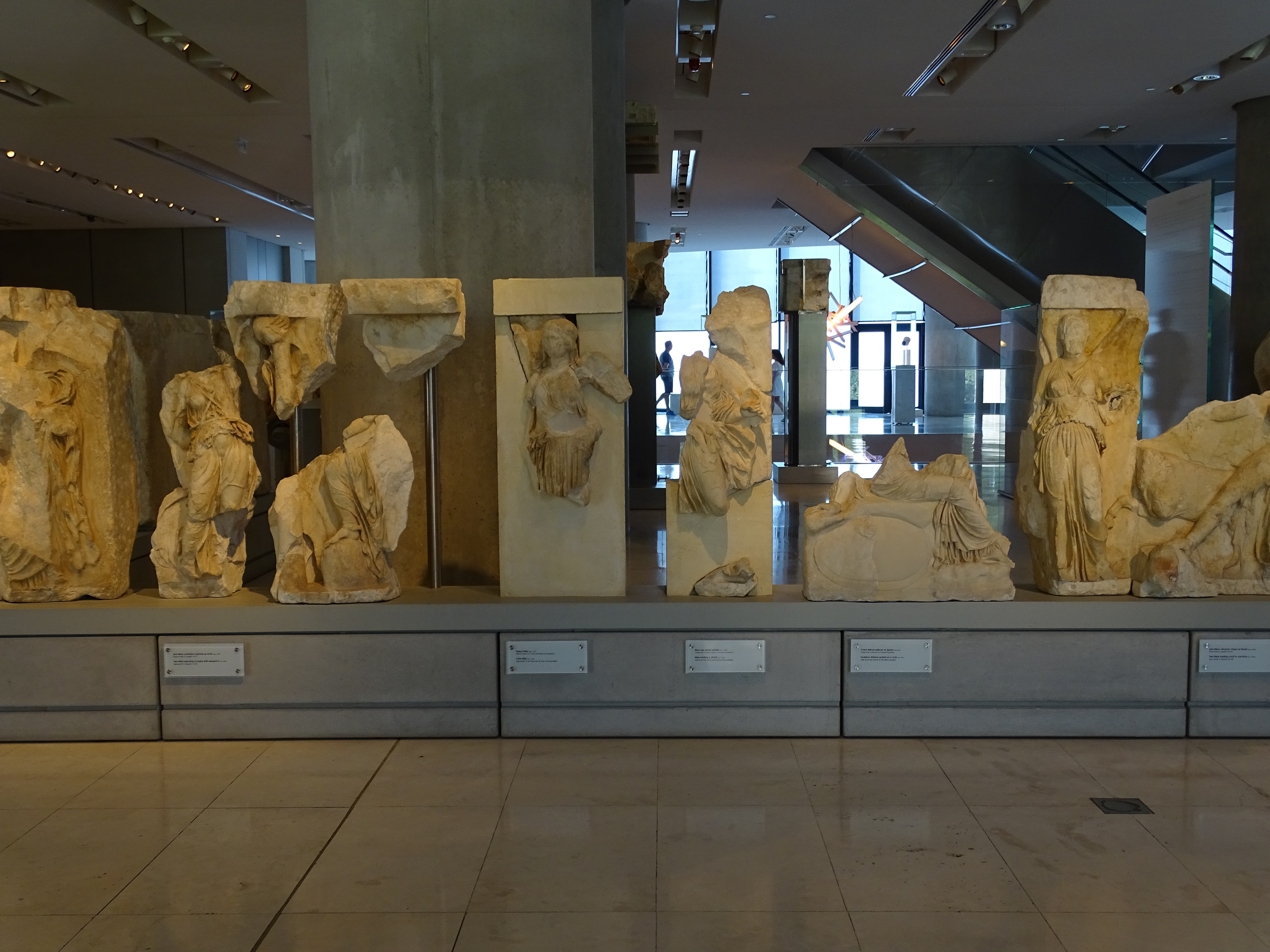
The parapet in the Acropolis Museum, Pentelic marble ca 410s BC, Athens Greece.

On the parapet, there would have stood a famous marble statue of a wingless Nike. The positioning of this statue has Nike leaning towards her right foot with her right arm stretching towards her sandal and her clothes slipping off her shoulder. For a while, there has been much debate over what the imagery of this statue is supposed to represent. There are many other uses of Greek sandal-related art found on cups, vases, and even on the friezes of the Parthenon. However, these versions all depict the subjects bending down with both arms stretched out to adjust or tie their sandals. The difference in imagery between one hand and two is what has caused discrepancy behind the meaning of the statue of a wingless Nike. It is most likely that Nike is instead removing or loosening her sandal as opposed to adjusting or putting it on. This use of imagery is thought to be used to demonstrate the action of removing footwear to those entering the temple to pay tribute to Athena, as this was a traditional action of worshiping in this space. The statue was discovered in 1835 near the temple. It is thought to have stood on the south side of the temple. It is currently held by the Acropolis Museum (inventory number Ακρ. 973).

The famous parapet of Nike removing her sandal is an example of wet drapery which shows the form of the body while also concealing the body with the drapery of the clothing. Some friezes are from the Persian and Peloponnesian wars. The friezes contained a cavalry scene from the battle of Marathon (490 BC) and a Greek victory over the Persians at the battle of Plataea (479). The battles represent Greek and Athenian dominance through military power and historical events.

A statue of Nike stood in the cella, or otherwise referred to as a naos. Nike was originally the "winged victory" goddess (see the winged Nike of Samothrace). The Athena Nike statue's absence of wings led Athenians in later centuries to call it Apteros Nike or wingless victory, and the story arose that the statue was deprived of wings so that it could never leave the city.

== Cornice and cyma ==
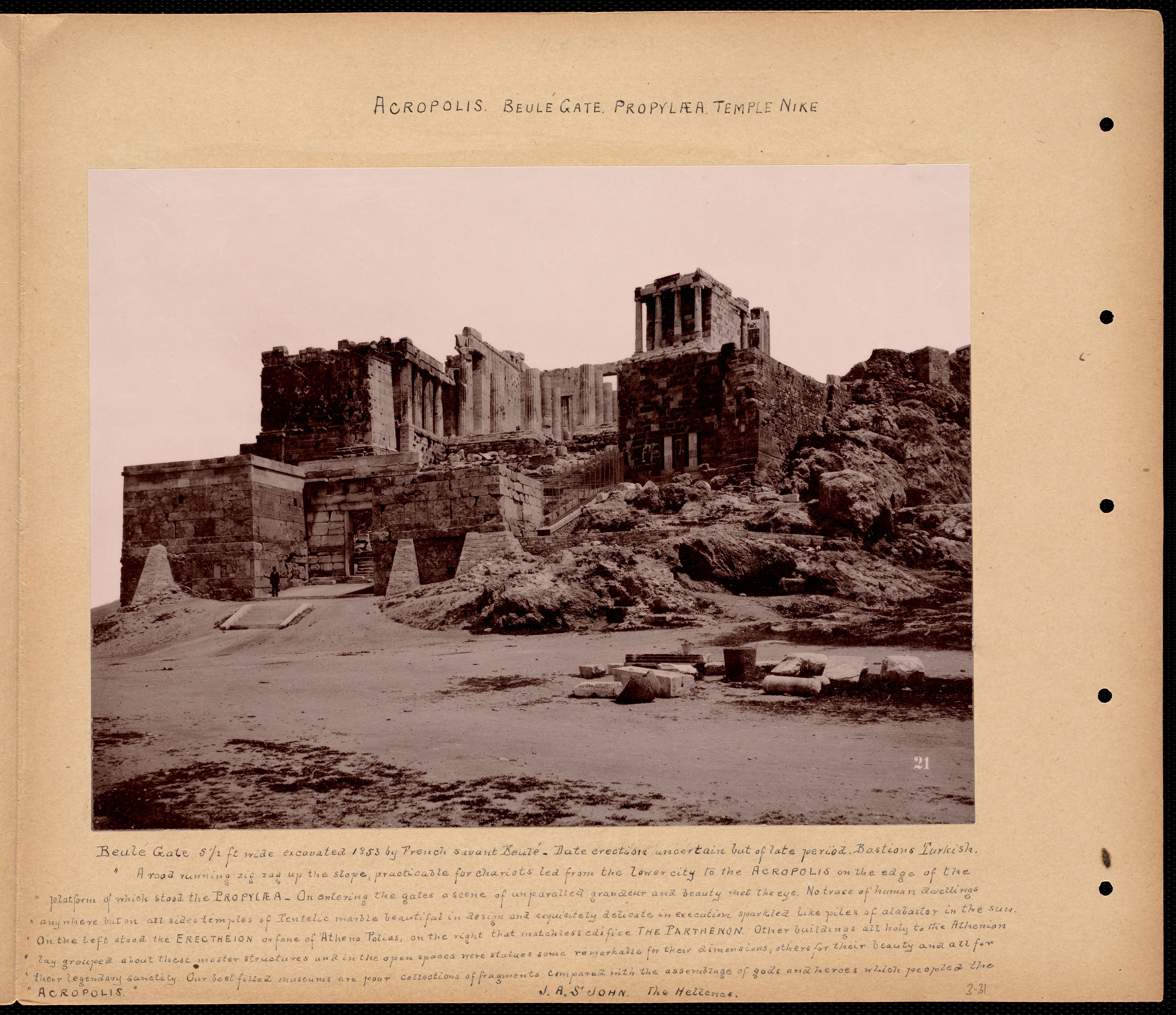
An 1893 photograph of the Acropolis showing the Beulé Gate, Propylaea and the Temple of Athena Nike

=== Cornice ===
The cornice follows standard architectural design and sits immediately above the frieze and wraps around the entire structure. Many sections of the cornice that have been discovered are believed to be part of the Temple of Athena Nike, however, some archaeologists think that some of the pieces found near the temple might not be part it. These pieces of the cornice are lined on the inside with an array of holes, supporting the idea that the cornice was held in place by dowels, which connected it to the frieze. Many of these cornice pieces are so weathered and worn that the dowel holes are no longer visible.

The cornice stretches flat and with no moldings that would create a design. If there had been a design, it would not be sculptural. There is evidence that would suggest that the cornice would have at one point been painted. However, because the architecture has been worn for such a long time, any knowledge of what the design could have been is long lost.

=== Cyma ===
Just above the cornice, on the north and south sides of the temple, rests the cyma. They sit at an angle on both sides, creating the slope that makes up the roofing and the pediment. Stretching along the cyma is an order of lion heads that extend outward. At each end of the cyma, where the corners would turn into the east and west faces of the temple, there are cuttings just above the cyma where an akroteria would have been placed.

== Akroteria ==
The main body of the central statue that made up the akroteria was composed of bronze, not marble. There is evidence of gold foiling and gold wiring through the main bronze core. Researchers have hypothesized on the form of the statue, such as a tripod, a trophy flanked by Nikai, or a composition based on the Nike erected by Paionios of Mende over the Spartan shield on the east facade of the Temple of Zeus at Olympia, but there is no trace of the original sculpture to indicate what the central akroteria really looked like.

The same can be said for the statues that would make up the east and west akroteria. Both were made of bronze and it is impossible to know what the figures could have been. Theories around the figure of the central statue include the winged horse Pegasus or the monster Chimera. However, these theories may be unlikely as the proportions of these animals’ bodies would not match where their feet would be placed in the akroteria's base block.

== See also ==
- List of Ancient Greek temples
- Architecture of Ancient Greece
- Art of Ancient Greece
- Classical architecture
- Classical sculpture
