= Nike Fixing her Sandal =

Ancient Greek relief of Nike in the Acropolis Museum

- Νίκη Σανδαλίζουσα (Greek)
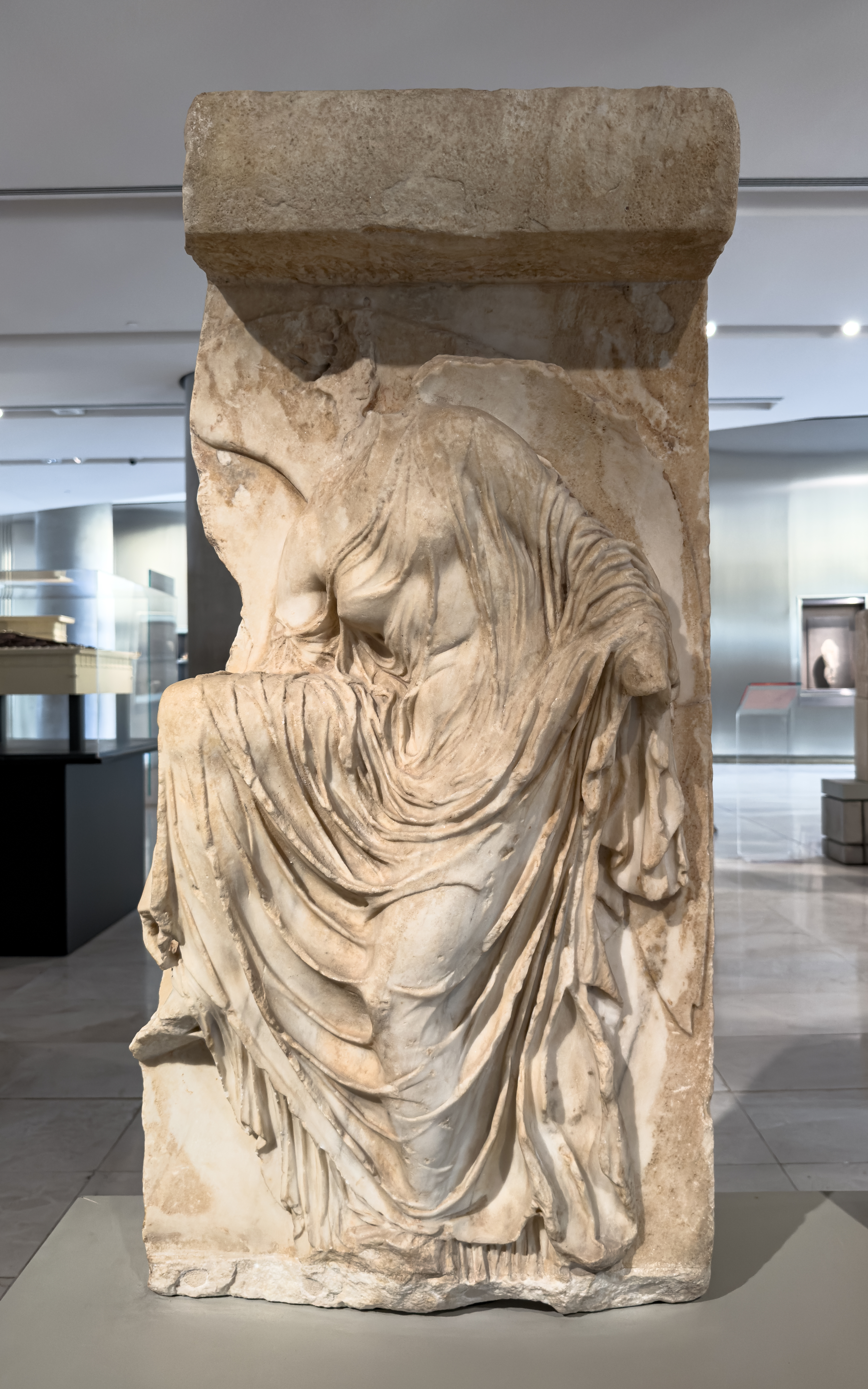
- The relief in the Acropolis Museum
- Year: 420–400 BC
- Catalogue: No 973
- Medium: Pentelic marble
- Movement: Early classical
- Subject: Nike fixes or removes her sandal
- Dimensions: 106 cm × 52 cm (42 in × 20 in)
- Condition: Hand, head and wing missing; right part of a larger slab
- Location: Acropolis Museum, Athens
- Owner: Greece

The Nike Fixing her Sandal (Ancient Greek: Νίκη Σανδαλίζουσα, romanized: Níkē Sandalízousa), also known as Nike Taking off her Sandal or Nike Sandalbinder, is an ancient marble relief depicting Nike, the ancient Greek goddess of victory, in the process of fixing or removing the sandal of her right foot. The late fifth-century BC sculpture is the remaining right part of a larger slab from a parapet, which originally adorned the Temple of Athena Nike on the Acropolis of Athens.

Although most of it is preserved, it bears significant damage as her head, left wing and left hand are missing. The relief is now kept and exhibited in the Acropolis Museum of Athens, in Greece with inventory number 973.

== History ==
A sculpture of the high classical period, it was produced around 420–400 BC, and it is the right part of a slab from the south side of the parapet of the Temple of Athena Nike on the Athenian acropolis. The parapet was built to protect people from accidentally falling off the rock.

The parapet surrounded the tower on which the temple stood on three of the four sides, built for the safety of the people climbing there. It consisted of several slabs, around one metre high each, with relief decoration, while holes on the upper surface of the slabs indicate that metal railing was once inserted in them, for additional protection. The subjects on the reliefs are the victorious celebration of Athens' battles against its enemies; with minor variations, the reliefs show repeated scenes of winged Nikes leading bulls or adorning victory trophies.

Its similarities with some of Aphrodite's iconography have been taken to suggest the existence of a cult to Aphrodite Pandemos in the area. The temple and the parapet of Athena Nike were demolished by the Ottomans in 1687 to strengthen the rampart and better fortify the western side of the Acropolis against the Venetian attacks of Venetian general Francesco Morosini; the slab was finally excavated in 1835 near that temple, under the direction of the archaeologist Ludwig Ross.

== Description ==
Nike leans forward and places her right foot upon a rock, the leg bent at the knee while she balances on her left leg, which is slightly bent. She uses her right hand to adjust the sandal, the act which gave the relief its name, while the upper part of her torso is turned to the front. Her left arm is slightly bent at the elbow and holds the folds of her himation so both ends fall on the left side. Her wings frame her figure from the behind.

She wears a himation (a type of cloak) and a very thin chiton with sleeves pinned on each of her shoulders, but the clip of the right shoulder sleeve has slipped off, causing the chiton to fall away from Nike's right breast. The thin cloth she wears with the many folds embraces the goddess's torso as if it is wet; the drapery is so thin it is nearly transparent.

Most of the upper rim of the balustrade remains. Her right hand is not actually touching the sandal but rather it looks like it is holding a strap. The head, neck, left hand, surface of the left foot and the top of the right wing are not preserved, having been broken off.

== Craftmanship ==
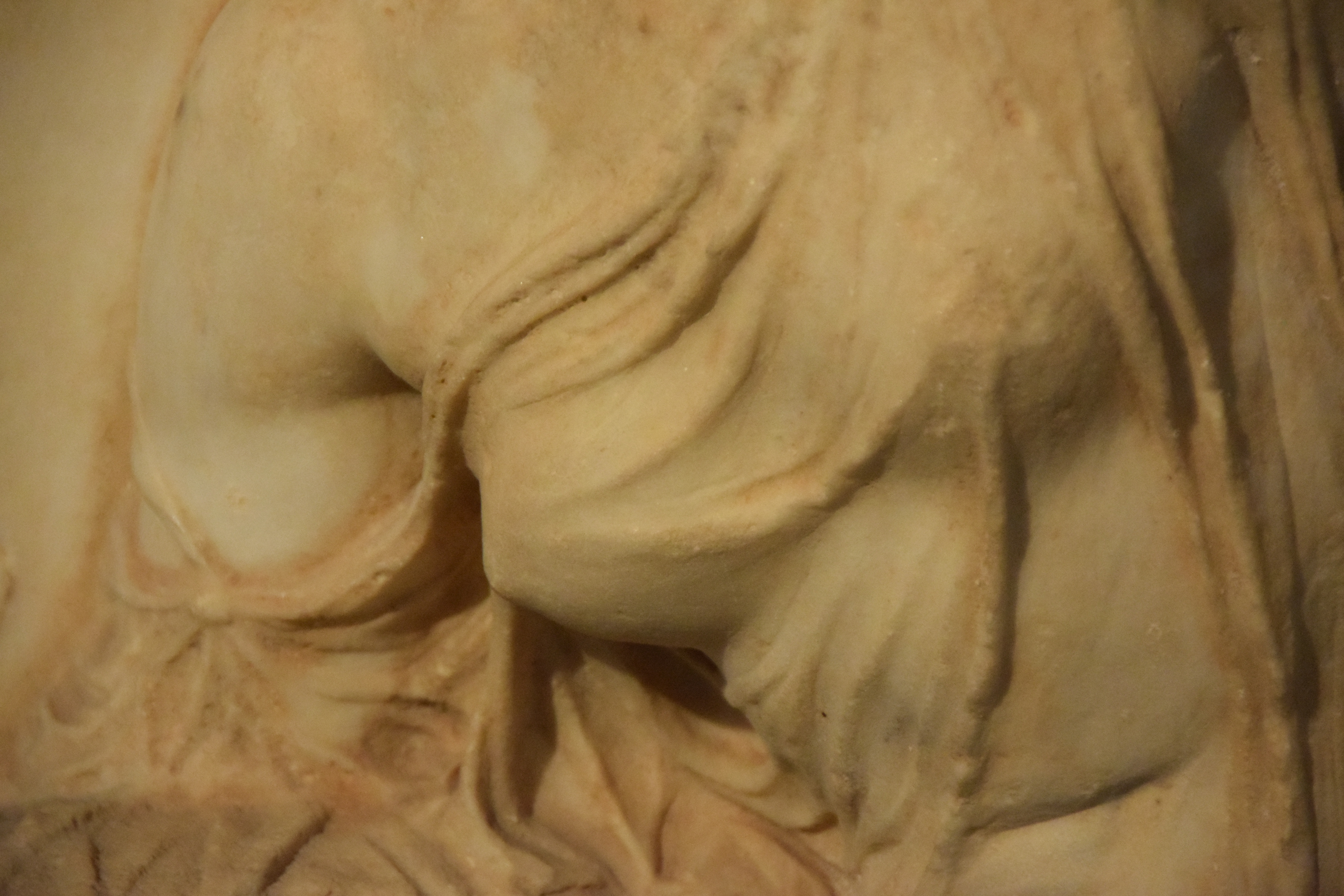
Detail of Nike's upper torso and drapery.

The relief was produced in the workshop of Agoracritus, commonly attributed to "Master E" whose work on the parapet has been described as "among the most stylistically advanced". The relief is made of Pentelic marble, and it is 106 cm tall and 52 cm wide.

This slab is the most noteworthy out of all the sculptures of Nike that have been found in temples, as no other known example has the same graceful attitude combined with the drapery's delicacy. The composition's originality is also considered to be one of the points that distinguish Nike Fixing her Sandal from other sculptures.

The elaborate drapery's folds of the chiton over the breast are finely worked, and there is clear distinction between the fabric and Nike's body underneath. The folds of the himation between the legs are very deeply cut; as Carpenter notes, the technique of the drapery involves the carving of occasional ridges over a fully modeled nude, and thus the drapery is used to emphasize the figure's pose. The sculptor has been noted for his use of catenary folds and many fine ridges widely spaced, as well as instances of chiton slipping off the shoulder to reveal more skin.

The lower party of the body is in profile or close enough to it, while the upper part is almost frontal; the drapery masks the transition, as well as the fact that should Nike's right leg be straightened, it would be longer than the left.

== See also ==
Other marble statues found in Greece include:

- Nike of Callimachus
- Victoria Romana (Hadrian's Library)
- Moscophoros
- Antenor Kore

== Bibliography ==
- Archaeological Society of Athens (1906). Μνημεία της Ελλάδος [Monuments of Greece] (in Greek). Athens: Π. Δ. Σακελλαρίου.
- Casson, Stanley (1921). Catalogue of The Acropolis Museum. Vol. IΙ: Sculpture and Architectural Fragments. Cambridge University Press.
- Kastriotis, Panagiotis (1895). Κατάλογος του Μουσείου της Ακροπόλεως [Catalogue of the Museum of the Acropolis] (in Greek). Athens: N. G. Inglesi.
- Morris, Ian (1994). Classical Greece: Ancient Histories and Modern Archaeologies. Cambridge University Press. ISBN 0-521-39279-9.
- Trianti, Ismene (1998). Το Μουσείο Ακροπόλεως [The Acropolis Museum] (PDF) (in Greek). Athens, Greece: OLKOS publications. ISBN 960-7169-84-0.
