= Nike of Paionios =

5th-century BC sculpture by Paeonius of Mende

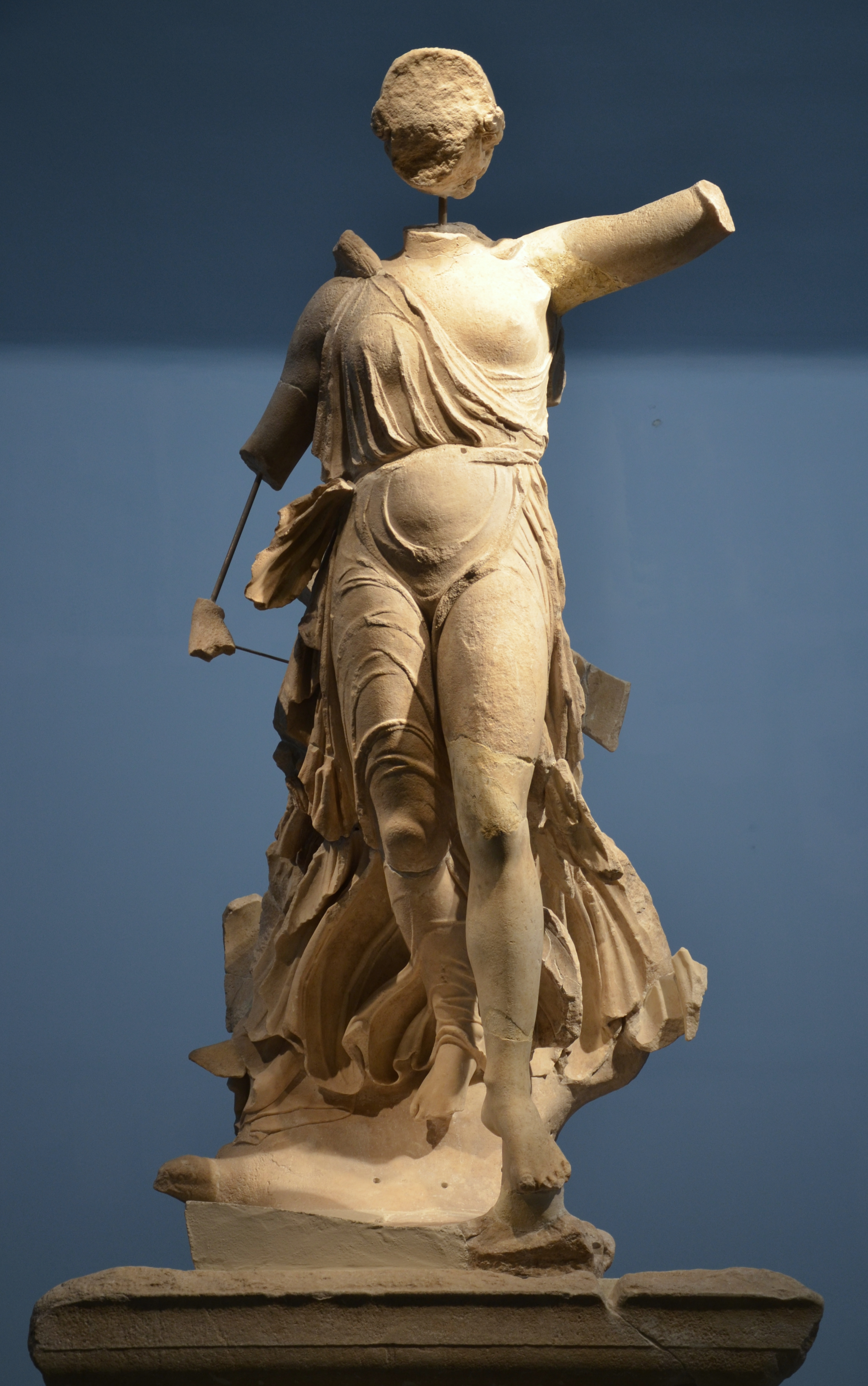
- Artist: Paionios
- Year: 425–420 BC
- Medium: Parian marble
- Dimensions: 198 cm (78 in)
- Location: Archaeological Museum of Olympia

The Nike of Paionios is an ancient Greek statue of the Greek goddess of victory, Nike, made by the sculptor Paeonius of Mende between 425 BC and 420 BC to stand at the Temple of Zeus at Olympia. It is made of Parian marble. Found in pieces, the statue was restored from many fragments but is lacking a face, wings, forearms, neck, toes, fragments of the drapery, and parts of the left leg. The goddess is shown landing gently on her left foot, with the drapery blowing against her body.

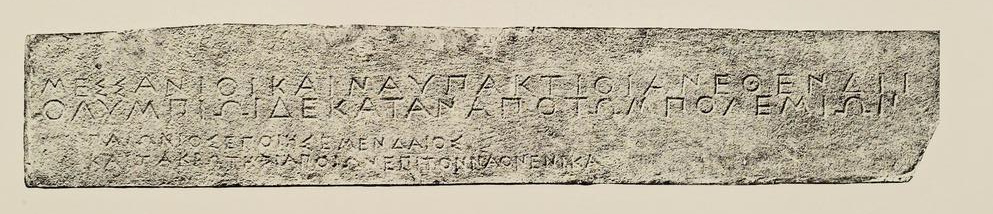
The dedicatory inscription

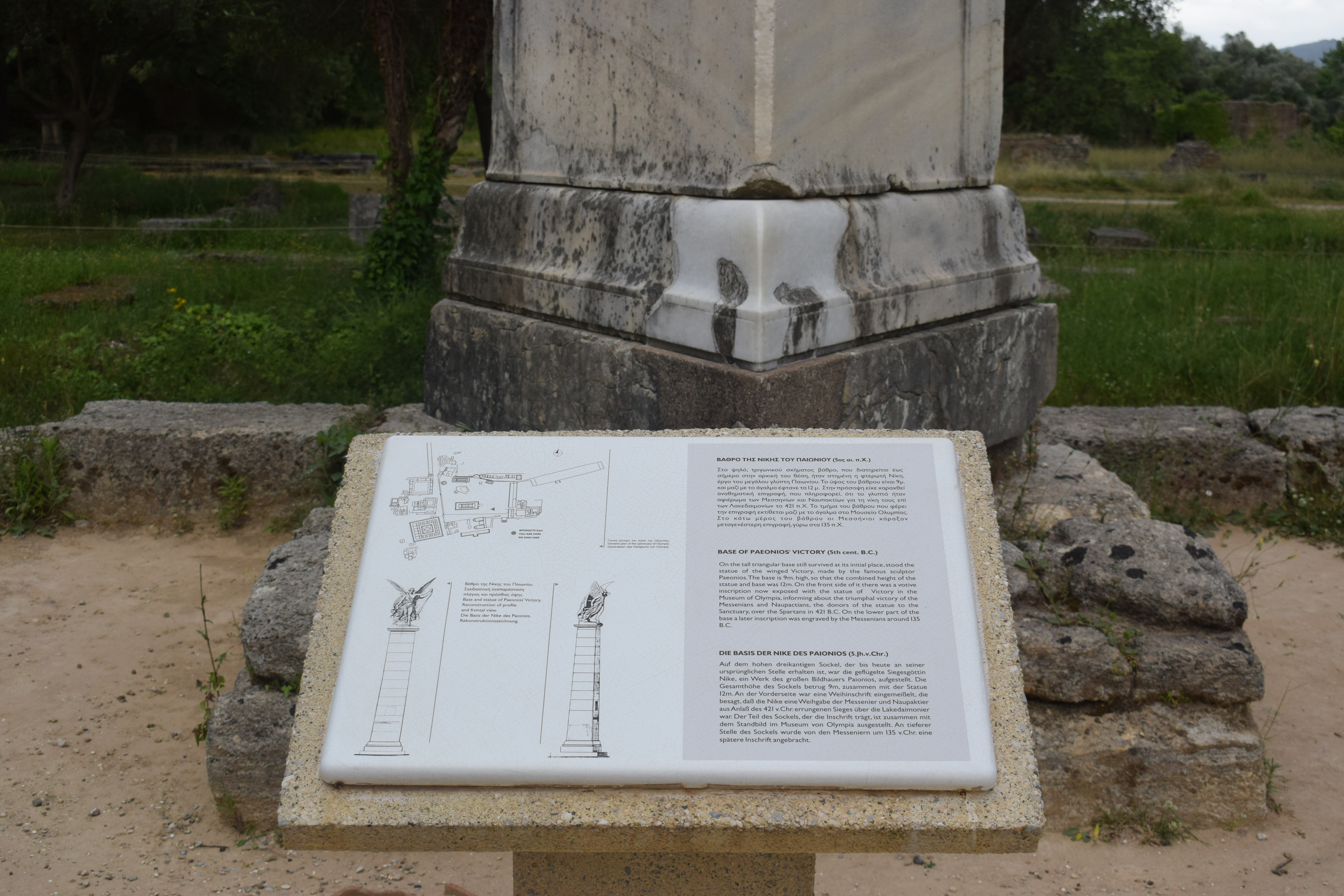
Descriptive plaque at the base in Olympia

== History ==
The statue was installed to commemorate the victory of a land battle between Athens and Sparta in efforts to recapture the small island of Sphacteria from the Spartans in 425 BC, and then erected in 420 BC a few years after the victory. It was common for statues of Nike to be commissioned and put up after significant victories and achievements. The statue's location, on top of a tall plinth directly outside the Temple of Zeus, would have ensured that it was seen by all Greeks who visited the sanctuary. It has the inscription:

Μεσσάνιοι καὶ Ναυπάκτιοι ἀνέθεν Διὶ
Ὀλυμπίωι δεκάταν ἀπὸ τῶμ πολεμίων.
Παιώνιος ἐποίησε Μενδαῖος
καὶ τἀκρωτήρια ποιῶν ἐπὶ τὸν ναὸν ἐνίκα.

— Inschriften von Olympia 259
Translation:

The Messenians and the Naupaktians dedicated this to Zeus Olympios as a tithe from the enemies.
Paeonius of Mende made it
and in making the acroteria for the temple he was victorious.

— James Whitley

Vermeule et al. propose that in this competition, the winner would be the one to carve the statue of Nike, and it went to Paeonius. His victory in the competition was likely the result of devising not only the most aesthetically pleasing option but also the most financially feasible. The second century AD travel writer Pausanias mentions the work in his description of Olympia, noting that it was "by Paeonius, a native of Mende in Thrace".

== Original location ==
The statue was excavated at Olympia in 1875–76, in the area of Elis, Greece. The statue originally stood near the Temple of Zeus on a triangular 6-metre high pillar. It would have been placed at the southwest corner of the temple, above the Sacred Way. The pedestal that this figure would have originally sat on is still in situ in Olympia. Including the pillar, the statue stood at 8 meters, without the pillar the statue stands at 198 cm tall. The placement of this dedicatory statue at Olympia, considered Spartan ground, is most often interpreted by scholars as a deliberate and assertive act of dominance.

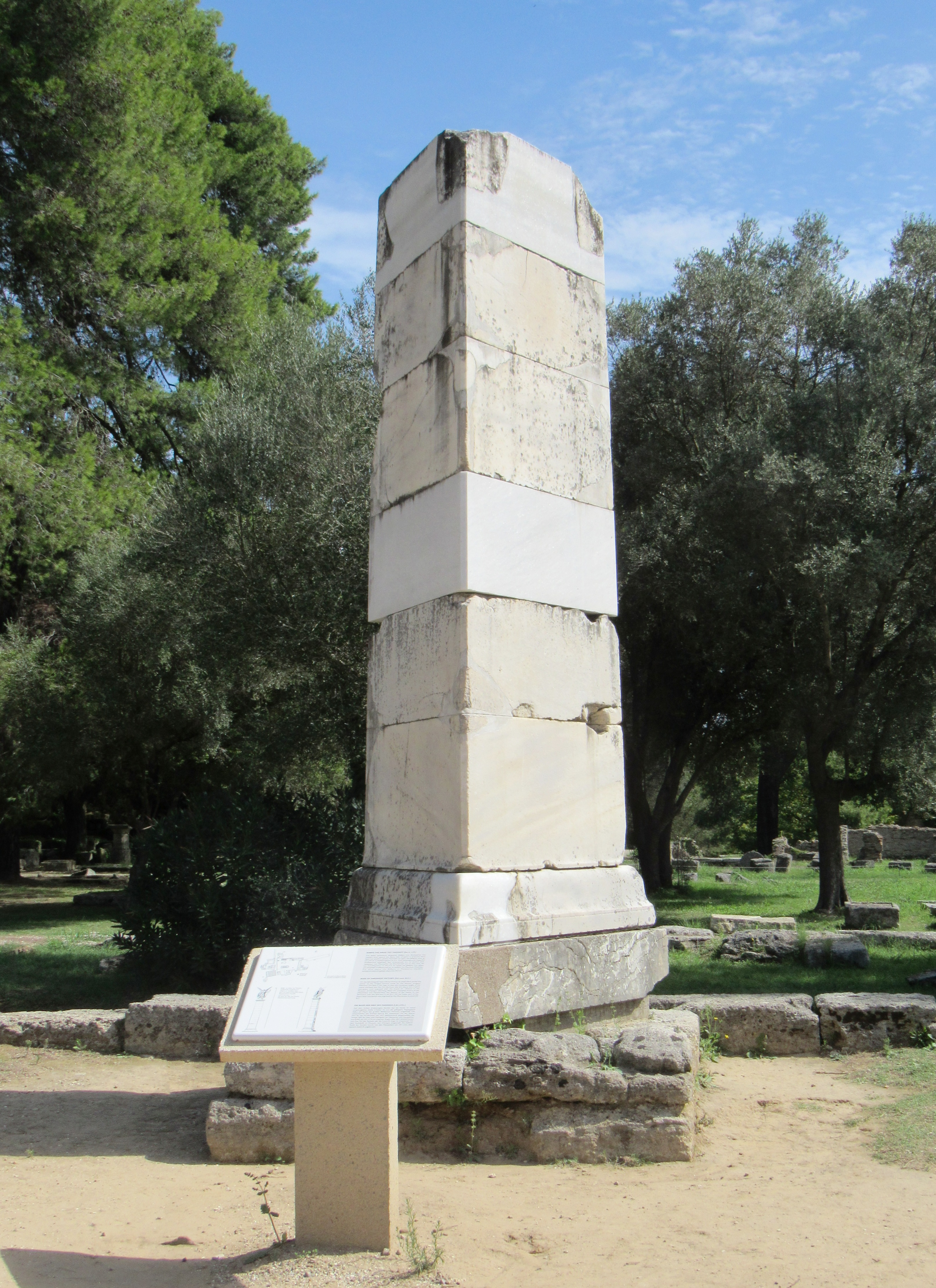
The original base, still in Olympia

== Description ==
Nike was by far the most common winged goddess portrayed in Classical art, and aside from her wings, her most consistently recognizable attribute, in both Athens and elsewhere, seems to have been her flying drapery. The statue was designed to stand atop a column and be seen from below, as one would walk up along the path to the temple. Nike stands on a cloud of marble, furthering the idea that she is in the sky and among the clouds, coming down to Earth. Nike is of the Classical period/style, which we can see through her drapery, in what is called florid style, evident in how tightly the material is folded and clinging to her body. Nike carries her himation, while she wears a chiton. Her long peplos garment has had one of the pins at the shoulders come undone, letting the drapery slip revealing her left breast. In combination with the wind blowing around her, the drapery clings to her, alluding to the shape of her torso and delicate maiden body. For this time, the amount of skin that Paeonius chose to reveal on this figure was "shockingly erotic" for the society it was created in. The fabric billows around and in between the legs, covering them but also enhancing them to the viewer. Her drapery gains substance only off the body, in which billowing folds are the heart of the composition and its meaning. Her draperies, blown by the wind, form a background for her figure. The goddess is represented in descending flight, positioned upon a triangular pedestal about thirty feet high, she seems all but independent of support. Below Nike's feet and flying to the viewer's left is an eagle, a bird closely associated with Zeus and directly referencing the god. The eagle at her feet suggests the element through which she moves. It inspires a sense of buoyancy, speed, and grace, shown through how the rapid flight throws back her drapery to reveal her form.

Paeonius combined both Ionian and Doric orders in this monument. The erection of an offering on a high pillar is of Ionian origin, as the Dorians tended to use lower bases. By placing a well-known, generic image of triumph upon a pillar to symbolize a specific Victory, Paeonius added to this tradition. The Ionians also favored marble more often, yet the Nike wears a Dorian peplos. Her left arm is and would have been raised upholding her himation, and her right would have been lowered. To those walking up to this statue along the sacred way, she may have been holding her hand out to the viewer in an uplifting and inspiring manner. Her wings, large and mostly missing in the original, would have extended up and back, which we can see from pieces still attached at her shoulders. This is a key feature that most, if not all depictions of Nike had. Like her iconic drapery, Nike's wings were just as tied to her image. Although the wings of this statue did not survive, other statues of Nike survive with wings, like the specially named Winged Victory of Samothrace.

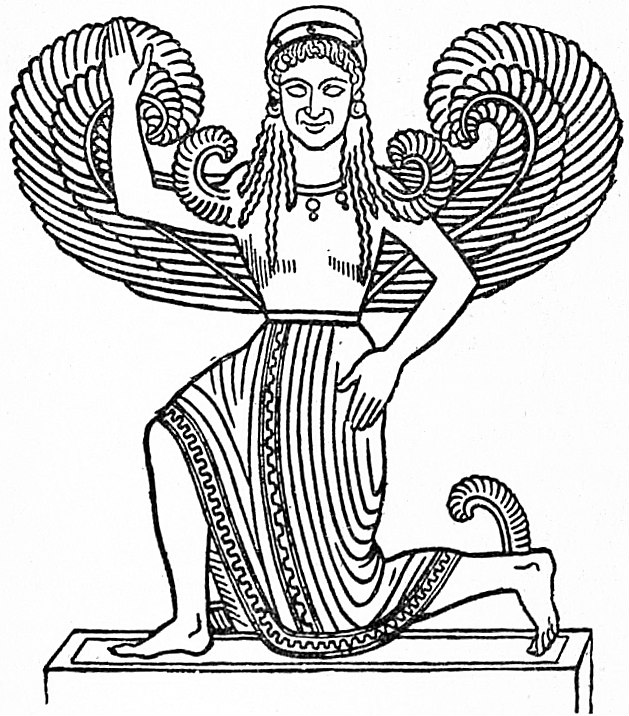
Drawing of a restoration of Nike of Delos (to compare stances)

The goddess is sculpted in the round, meaning that the viewer would be able to view it from any angle. This is evident in that all sides of Nike show a different feature, allowing people viewing it from all sides to you get a complete view of the statue. The statue itself would have originally stood at about 1.96 m, or 6 ft 6 in tall, making her over life-sized. This would have been important as she would have been high up on the pedestal, and away from the viewer's direct line of sight. By making her larger than life, this makes her more legible from the ground while also placing emphasis on her importance. The stance that this Nike takes marks a transition from older depictions of Nike that had her kneeling sideways to having her coming forwards towards the viewer, engaging directly towards them.

Like many sculptures of this time period, this statue would have been painted. The painted colors of the drapery would have contrasted with her (likely unpainted) white skin, which would have emphasized just how much of her skin was on view (i.e. her left leg and her left breast).

== Copies ==
There have been many copies made of this, and many recreations. For example, there has been a full-body recreation of this statue, which was a cast of an original. This example of a plaster cast can be seen at the Wilcox Classical Museum, with her face, wings, and legs intact.

There is a recreation in which a full 3D model has been created and open to explore online. This allows for viewing of all sides of the statue, as one could in person.

== Legacy ==
On the medals used for the 2004 Summer Olympics hosted in Athens, the front side of the medal presents the statue of Nike of Paionios with ancient Olympia in the backdrop, while the other side of the medal features the eternal flame, framed by the first verse of the eighth Olympic Hymn (Olympic Anthem) by Pindar, along with the logo of the Athens Games. Both sides were designed by Greek jewelry designer Elena Votsi, and Votsi's design for the front side has been used for every instance of the Summer Olympics ever since, albeit with minor alterations (the medal design for the 2024 Summer Olympics held in Paris, for example, had the Eiffel Tower located on the left side of the statue).

Until the 1990s, the statue was used on Panionios football club shields.

== Gallery ==
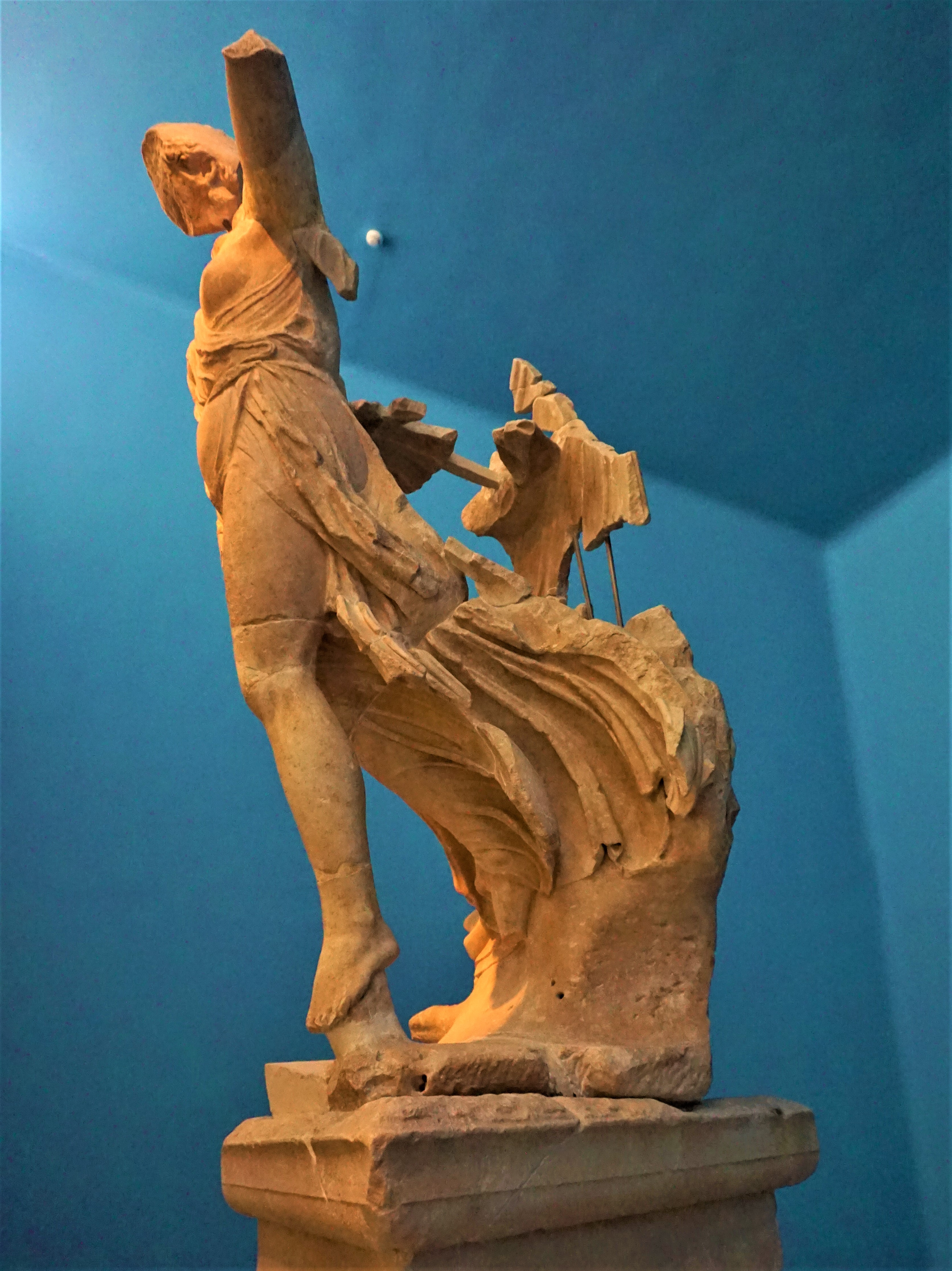
View of the statue from the right, emphasizing the drapery

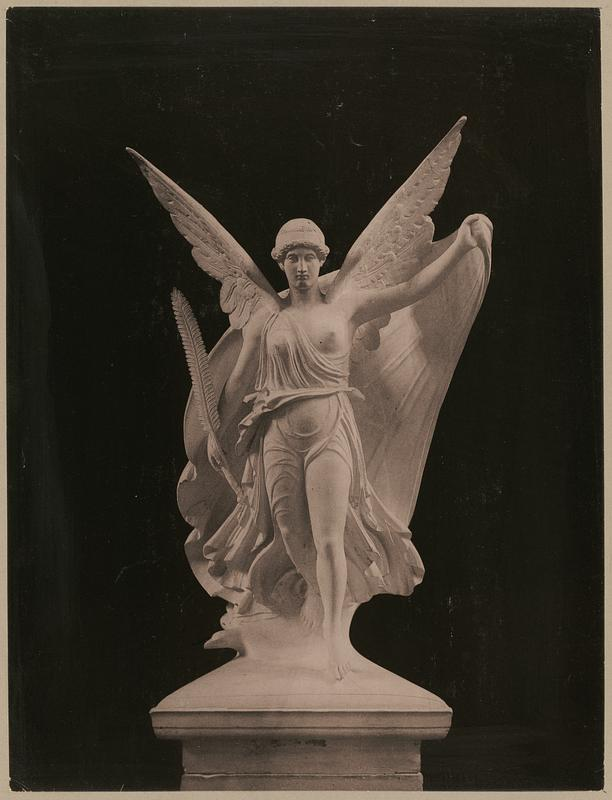
Plaster model of the statue, restored by Richard Grüttner

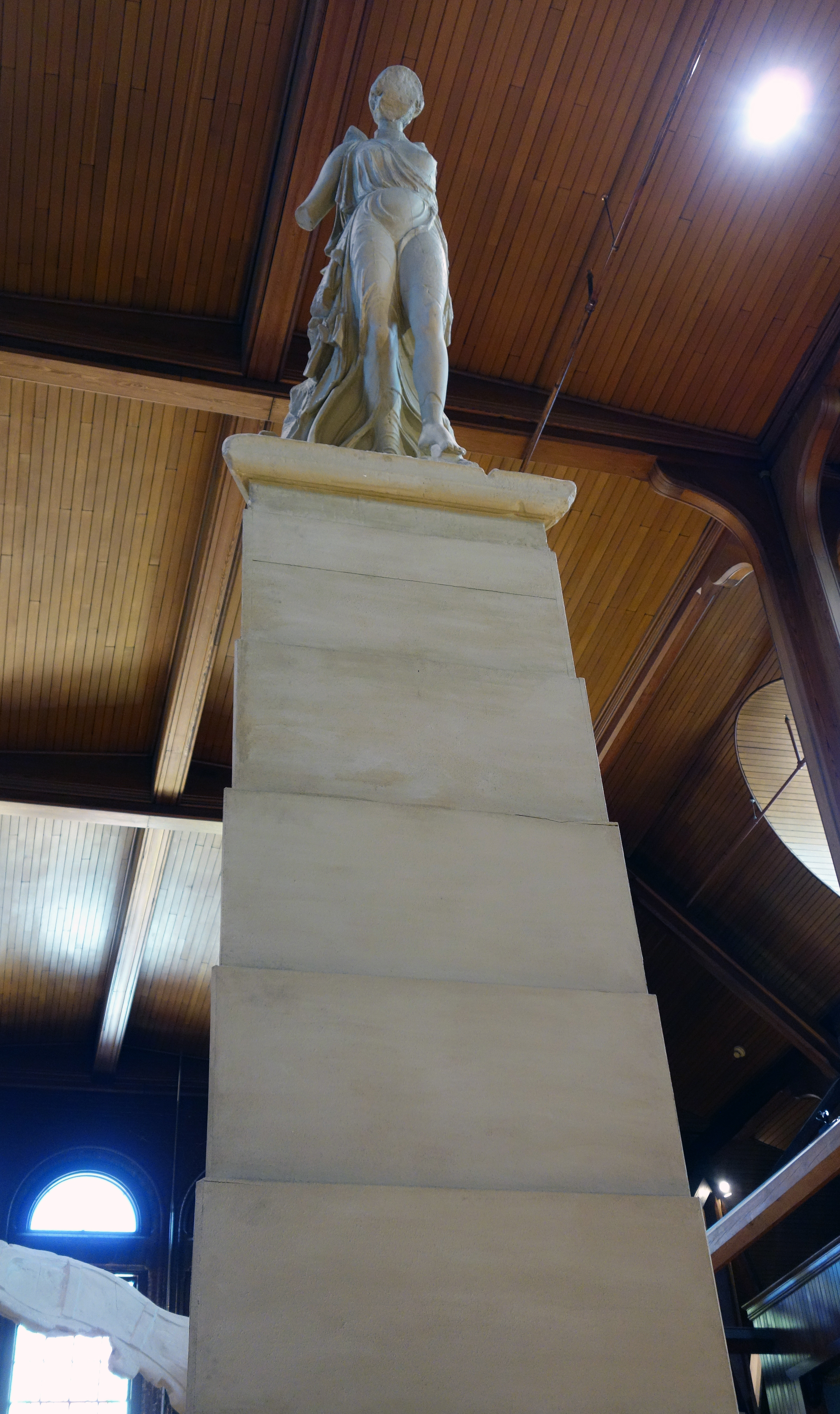
Plaster cast of the statue and its base at the Slater Memorial Museum, closer to how contemporary viewers were able to view the statue

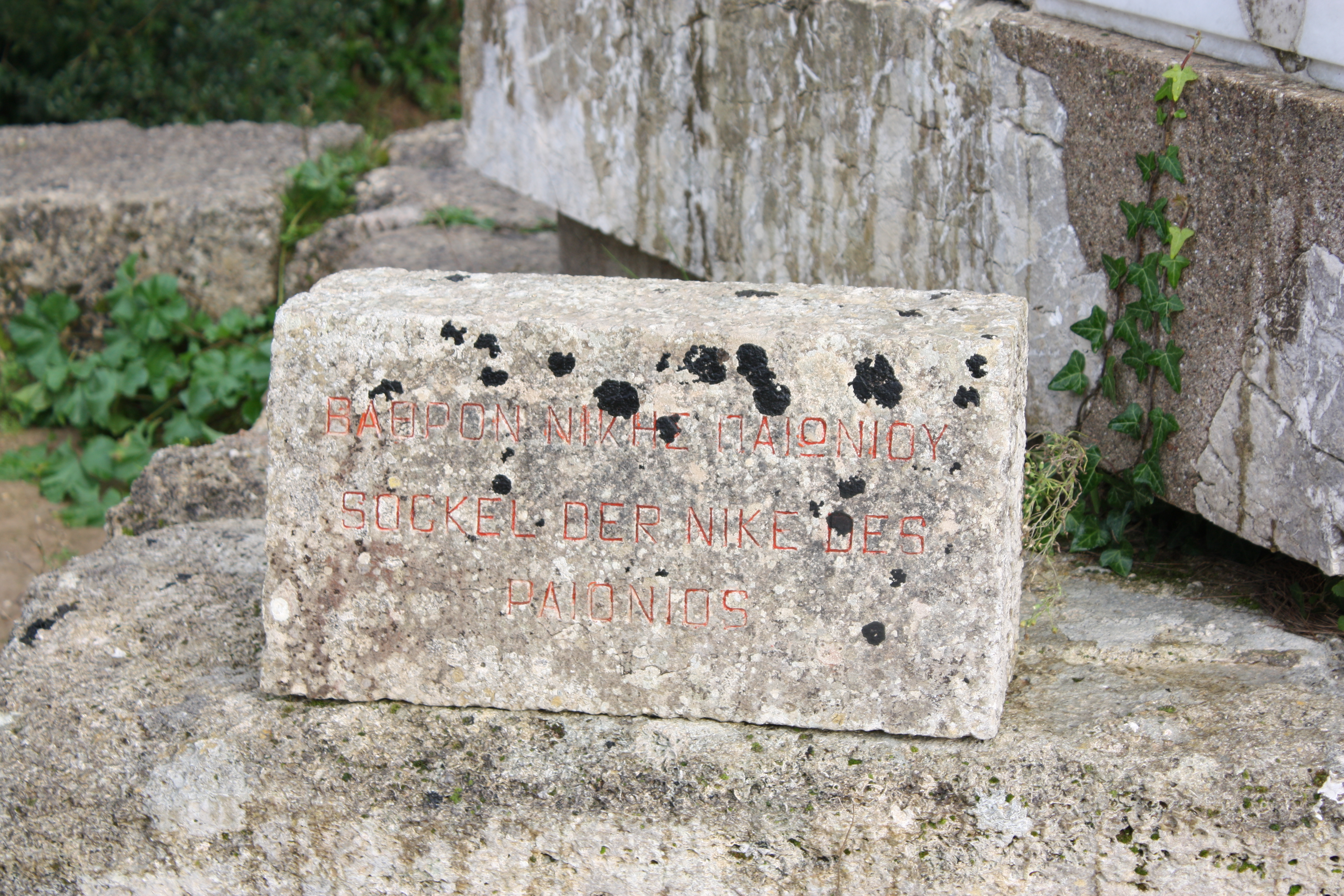
Marker at the location of the base

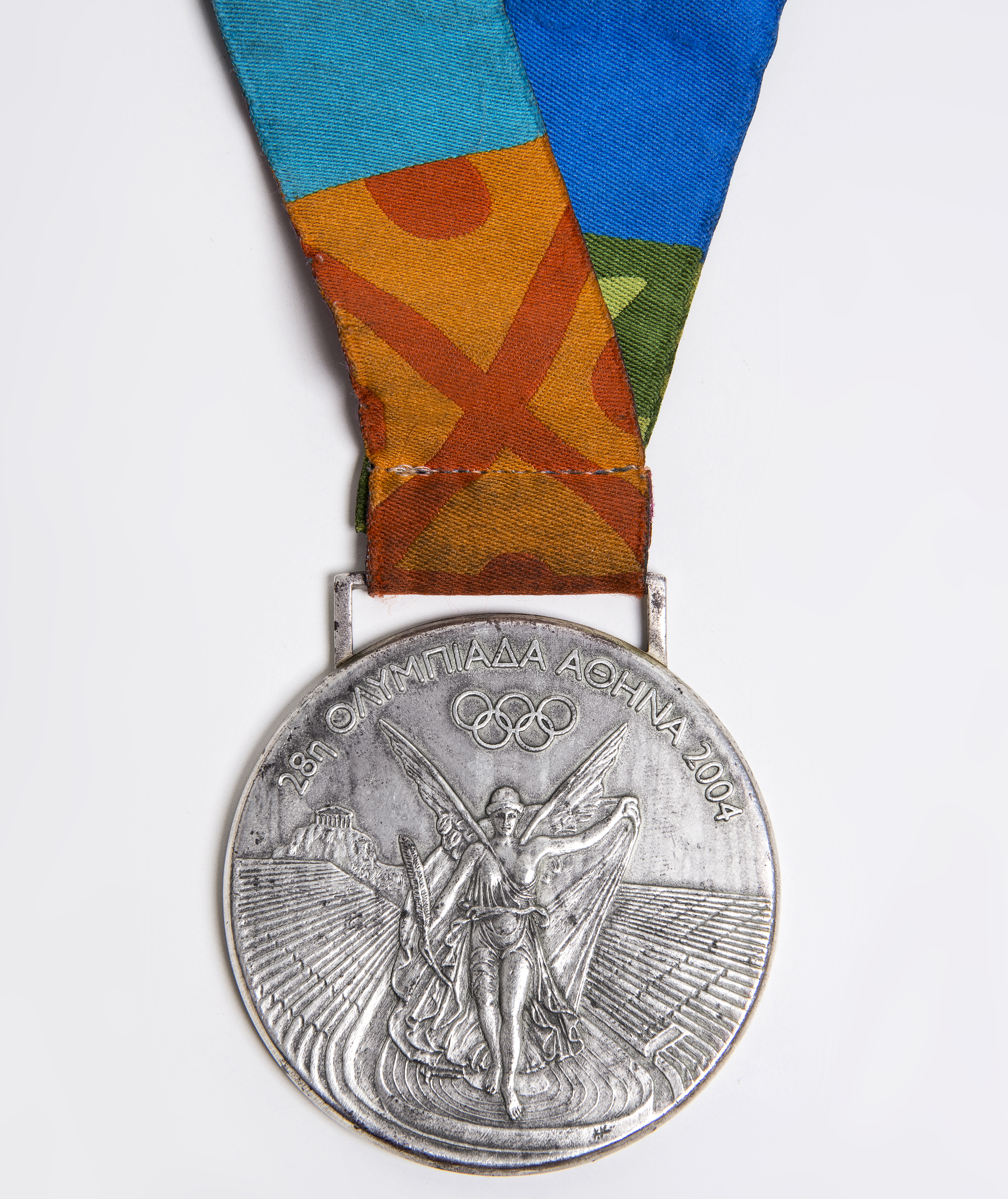
Front of the 2004 Athens Olympic Medal

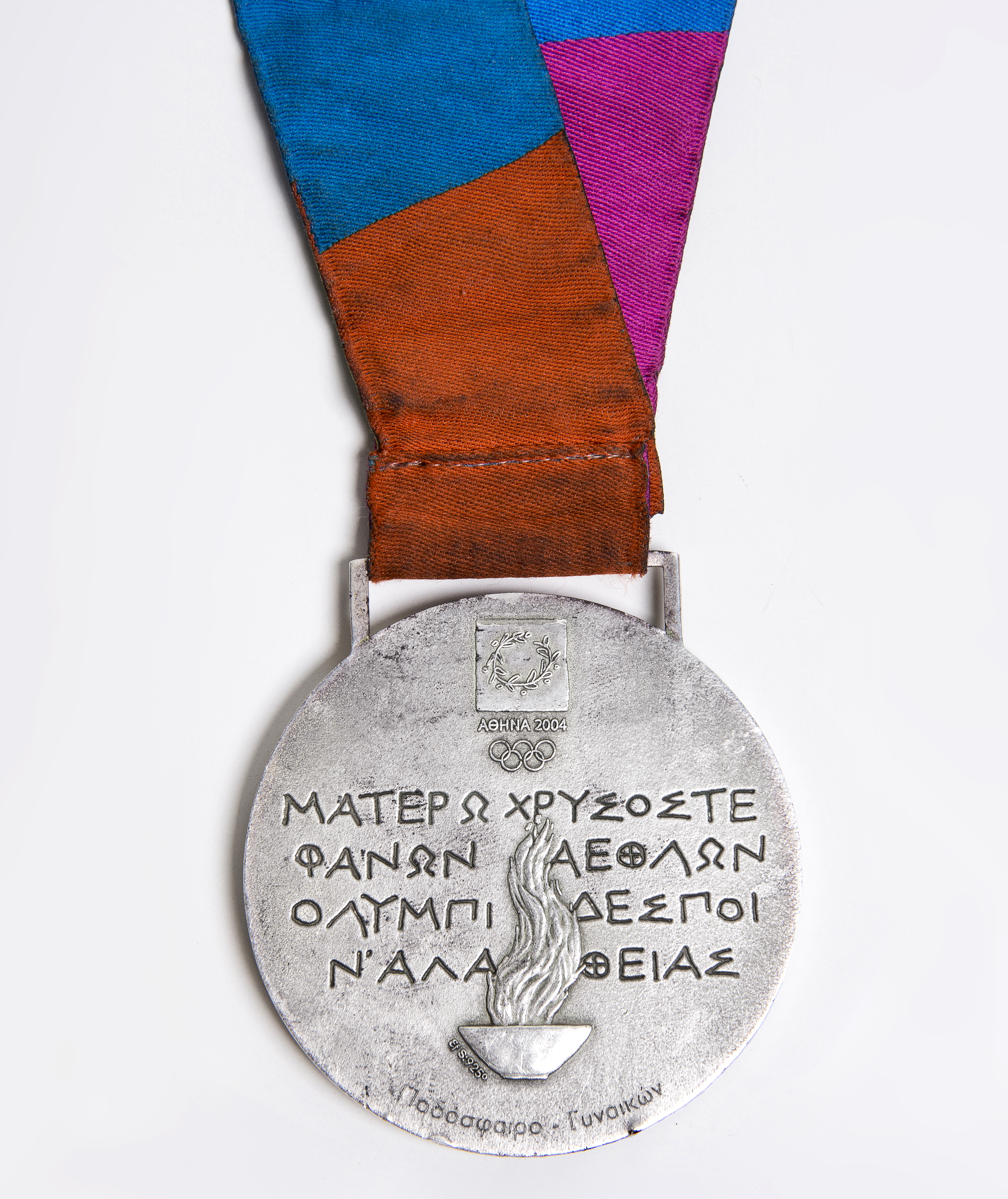
Back of the 2004 Athens Olympic Medal

== See also ==
- Athena Nike
- Victoria Romana (Hadrian's Library)
- Nike Fixing her Sandal
- Nike of Paros
