= Victoria Romana (Hadrian's Library) =

Statue of the goddess Victoria-Nike

Victoria Romana from Hadrian's Library
- Νίκη της Βιβλιοθήκης του Αδριανού (Greek)
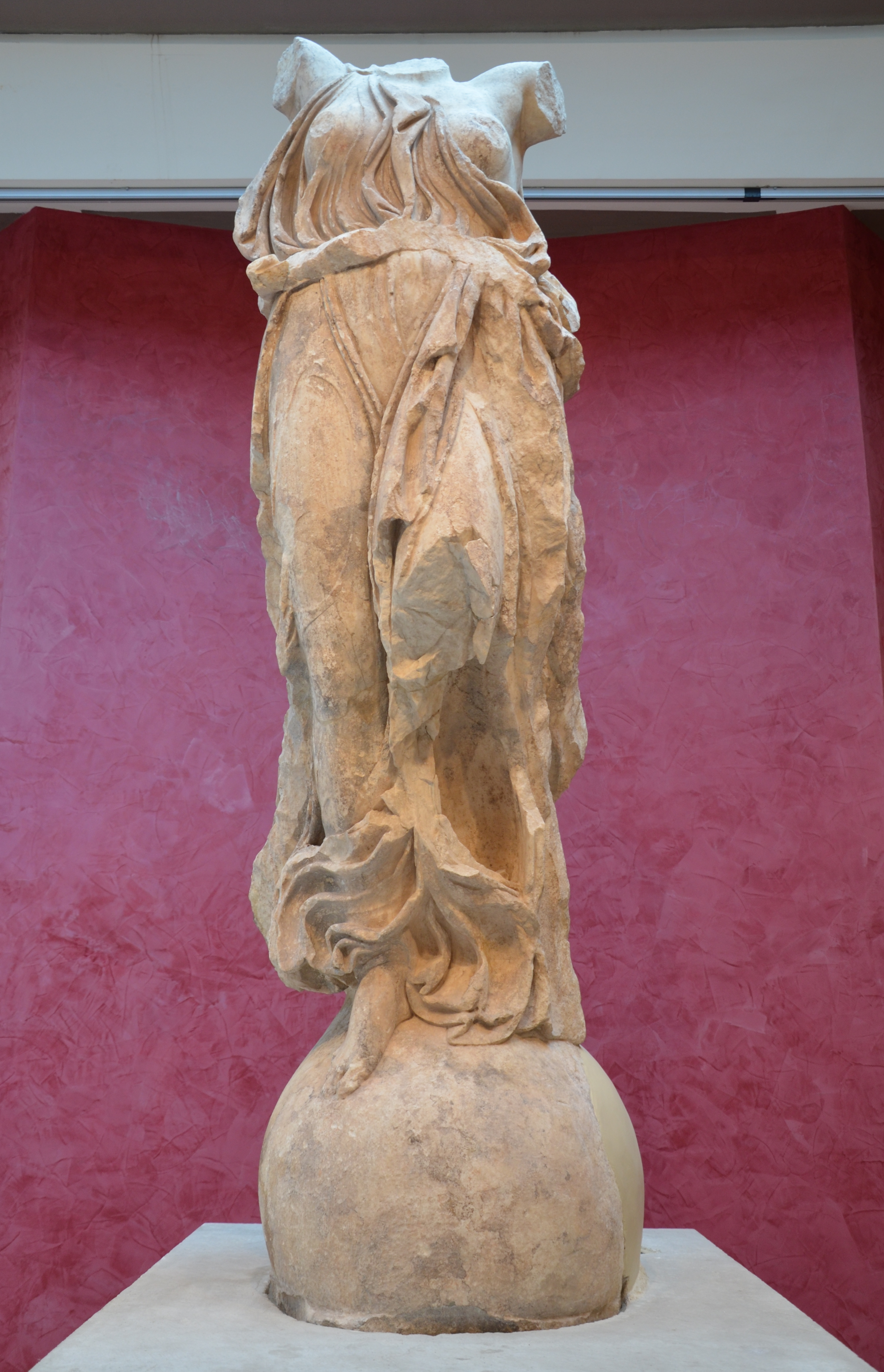
- The statue in the Library museum
- Year: 1st century BC
- Medium: White marble
- Movement: Roman
- Subject: The goddess Victoria/Nike
- Dimensions: 255 cm (100 in)
- Condition: Head, arms, wings and left leg missing
- Location: Hadrian's Library, Athens

The Victoria Romana from Hadrian's Library (Greek: Νίκη της Βιβλιοθήκης του Αδριανού) is a large sculpture of the Greek goddess of victory Nike (known to the Romans as Victoria) that once adorned Hadrian's Library, a large library built in Athens by the Roman Emperor Hadrian (r. 117–138 AD) during the second century AD. It was probably created much earlier, during the first century BC, perhaps to commemorate some victory of Emperor Augustus.

The larger-than-lifesize marble statue was unearthed in the Library's plot in 1988 and it is missing its head, arms, wings and left leg below the knee. It is now exhibited in a small exhibition room in the Library along with several other findings from the site. The statue and the exhibition room are currently not available to the public.

== History ==
=== Dating ===
The dating of the Victoria Romana from Hadrian's Library has been a difficult task. The sculpture, defined by its mature classical character, is very similar to creations of the late fifth century BC, but nevertheless it is without a doubt that the Victoria is an original Roman work without any previous parallel. The most agreed consensus places the creation of the Victoria during the first century BC during the Augustan and pre-Hadrianic period; after Emperor Augustus's victory over the Parthians in 18 BC, he must have dedicated the statue during his stay in Athens, during which he also financed the completion of the Roman Agora of the city. The Victoria Romana would have been placed at the front of the facade. Later during Hadrian's reign it transferred to the Library, and put somewhere at the south wing.

Hadrian probably chose this statue to adorn his library as a tribute to Augustus, and deliberate imitation of him. Following the year 123, AD Hadrian abandoned his previous title of Imperator Caesar Traianus Hadrianus Augustus and adopted the epithet Hadrianus Augustus instead, as he aspired to be identified as the new Augustus.

=== Discovery ===
The Victoria Romana was recovered from the well of an Ottoman cistern at the south wing of the facade of Hadrian's Library during excavations in 1988. It took its name from the sculptural theme it belongs to, that of the "Roman victory".

During excavations some years later in 1999 a fragment of a parallel statue was unearthed; an oversized globe with a portion of the right foot of a figure on it. It was found embedded into an Ottoman-era well. Just like the statue of Victoria, the missing figure was not standing completely upright, but tilted to the right. This fragment measures 54 cm in height and 40 cm in width (21 in × 16 in). The discovery of this second globe that no doubt belonged to another Victoria statue confirms that there existed a group of Victoriae Romanae in the Library, among several other colossal statues.

== Description ==
With a height of 2.55 m, the white marble statue of Victoria is over lifesize, and has been categorized as a statue of the Victoria Romana type. The goddess is depicted dressed in peplos, and landing from the sky. The Victoria's right foot rests onto a large globe, while her advancing left leg is only fragmentarily preserved, missing from below the knee. Both of her non-preserved arms were raised. The goddess's wings are also missing, as is her head, although a fragmentary head belonging to a female figure was found later in 1992 within short distance and has been attributed to this statue, based mainly on the matching size. That head, however, has not been reattached to the headless sculpture.

The rear side of the sculpture is not as elaborately carved as the front, whereas at the lower part, a deep square socket is preserved for the insertion of a metal tie beam through which the statue was firmly secured in place, meaning that the Victoria was installed at a great height in the Library. In order to render her landing, the statue has been carved so that it deviates from its vertical axis, leaning intensely forward. Meanwhile, the wind illusion is achieved by the moving drapery of her garment, which creates many folds around Victoria's legs as it swirls, leaving one breast exposed. The sculpture is a masterfully created one, by a sculptor whose identity remains unknown. Her drapery is free, deeply carved and following the figure's movement. In order to separate the folds drill was used, but the marks would not have been visible at such great height the Victoria was placed. Additionally, the edges of Victoria's garment, especially those on the back side are not rendered in detail, and stand in contrast to the plain and elegant folds of the statues in Augustus's age.

Victoria, like Nike before her, was often depicted holding wreaths, bowls, cups or even lyres, but never with globes in archaic Greek art; Nike had never been shown on a globe until Emperor Augustus popularised this image on a denarius in 31 BC. It is possible that the globe imagery originated from a statue of Nike/Victoria from Tarentum, although there is no solid historical evidence for that assumption.

== See also ==
Other sculptures of the goddess Nike:

- Winged Victory of Samothrace
- Nike Fixing her Sandal
- Nike of Paionios
- Nike of Epidaurus

== Bibliography ==
- Boatwright, Mary (Tolly) (2000). Hadrian and the Cities of the Roman Empire. Princeton, US: Princeton University Press. ISBN 978-0-691-09493-9.
- Sidrys, Raymond V. (December 31, 2020). The Mysterious Spheres on Greek and Roman Ancient Coins. Oxford: Archaeopress Publishing Ltd. ISBN 978-1-78969-790-2.
- Sourlas, Dimitris (2021). "The Emperor's Nike. The Nike in Hadrian's Library as a means of promoting power and imperial ideology". In Maria Lagogianni-Georgakarakos (ed.). Known and Unknown Nikai. Athens, Greece: Greek Ministry of Culture and Sports. ISBN 978-960-386-512-4.
